= Ollokot =

Nez Perce Indian war leader (1840s–1877)

- Ollikut
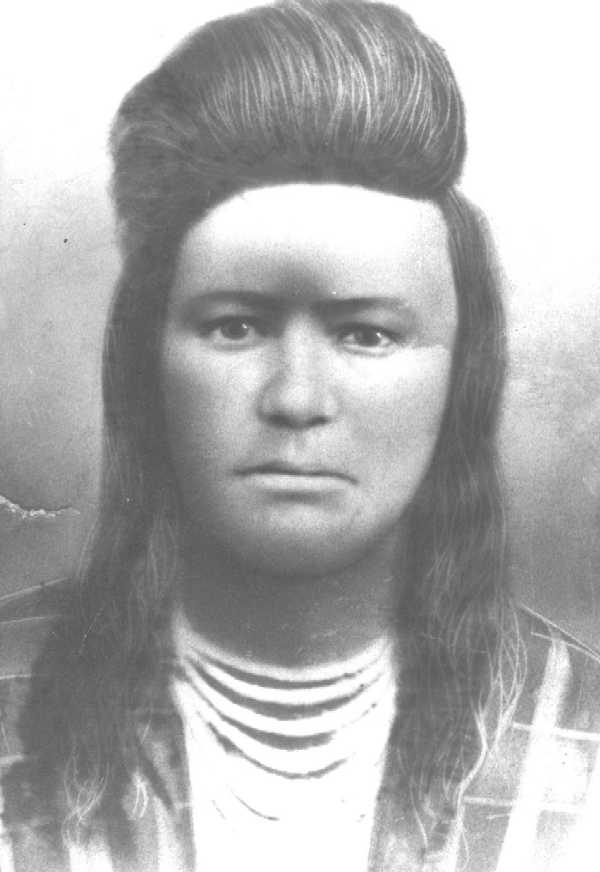
- Ollokot
- Born: 1840s Wallowa, Oregon
- Died: September 30, 1877; Blaine County, Montana
- Cause of death: Gunshot wound
- Spouse: Tamalwinonmi
- Children: Sarah Connor
- Relatives: Tuekakas (father) Chief Joseph (brother)
- Military career
- Allegiance: Wallowa band of Nez Perce Indians
- Conflicts: Nez Perce War

Ollokot (Ollikut álok'at) (born 1840s – died 30 September 1877), was a war leader of the Wallowa band of Nez Perce Indians. He was killed in the Nez Perce War in 1877.

== Early life ==
Ollokot was the son of Tuekakas or Old Joseph and the younger brother of Chief Joseph. His father and brother were advocates of peace and passive resistance to encroachments by White settlers and miners on the land of the Nez Perce. Ollokot, described as tall, graceful, intelligent, fun-loving and daring, was a hunter and warrior but also experienced in diplomacy, accompanying his father and older brother to treaty negotiations between the U.S. and Nez Perce in 1855 and 1863. In early 1877, Ollokot participated with Chief Joseph in negotiations with General O. O. Howard. Howard demanded that Joseph's and Ollokot's people move from their traditional lands in the Wallowa Valley of Oregon to a reservation established for them in Idaho. Although Ollokot supported the peace initiatives of his brother in council, Howard believed that behind the scenes Ollokot was on the side of the "reckless young men, who would rather than not have a fight with the white men."

Ollokot was married to Tamalwinonmi (Cloudburst) and the couple had one child who later became known as Sarah Connor.

== War ==
Although Joseph and Ollokot eventually acceded to Howard's demand that the Nez Perce relocate to the reservation, a handful of Nez Perce warriors, outraged by abuses they had suffered (especially the murder of a Nez Perce man by a settler in a property dispute), precipitated the war by attacking and killing 18 White settlers in June 1877. General Howard sent out two companies of cavalry to punish the Nez Perce, but at the Battle of White Bird Canyon on 17 June, 70 Nez Perce, co-led by Ollokot, decisively defeated a larger force of soldiers and civilian volunteers.

The Nez Perce, numbering only about 800 with less than 200 fighting men, then undertook a remarkable 1,400 mile (2,300 km) retreat across Idaho, Wyoming, and Montana. Although Chief Joseph is usually considered the leader of the Nez Perce, the war chiefs such as Ollokot, Looking Glass, White Bird, and Toohoolhoolzote probably determined the strategy and tactics of the Indians. The Nez Perce won victories, or escaped from larger U.S. army forces, in battles at Cottonwood, Clearwater, Big Hole, and Canyon Creek. Ollokot and 60 young men surrounded and pinned down a larger number of soldiers at the Battle of the Big Hole, permitting the Nez Perce to escape. Later, he and others immobilized General Howard by stealing his pack mules at the Battle of Canyon Creek.

However, the Nez Perce were finally surrounded in the Bear Paw Mountains of Montana by hundreds of U.S. soldiers, only 40 miles (65 km) from their objective, the Canadian border. After the five-day Battle of Bear Paw, Chief Joseph surrendered on October 5, 1877. Ollokot had been killed on the first day of the battle, September 30, 1877. In his famous surrender speech Joseph acknowledged Ollokot: "He who led the young men is dead."
