= Poker Joe =

Native American leader

Poker Joe (Wahwookya Wasaäw, 18?? - 1877) was popularly known for his contribution to the Nez Perce people during the Nez Perce War of 1877. He went by several monikers to include Little Tobacco, Hototo, and Nez Perces Joe. Half French Canadian and half Nez Perce, his birth name was Joe Hale, and his tribal name was Lean Elk. Joe Hale gained the nickname Poker Joe through his obsession with gambling and poker.

== Initial involvement in the Nez Perce War ==
Poker Joe lived in Missoula, Montana before his involvement with the Nez Perce War. Under the guidance of Chief Joseph, the Nez Perce avoided a run-in with soldiers and local militia in Missoula, and ended up in Yellowstone National Park—uncharted territory for the group. In need of a navigator, they commandeered the services of a prospector named John Shivley, whom they found camping alone along the Firehole River. A small man with a big voice, Poker Joe acted as Shivley's interpreter for the thirteen days he was held captive. According to Shivley's testimony (he escaped near the Absaroka Range on September 5, 1877), the Nez Perce had no definitive leader in place, with the rather pleasant and casual Chief Joseph wearing one feather on his headpiece, while Poker Joe wore two. Chief Joseph was heavily involved in diplomatic duties in the days leading up to the war, which is why he is viewed as the Nez Perces leader. However, it was Poker Joe who carried out negotiations for much-needed supplies and was responsible for the interrogation and release of tourists detained by his tribe during the war.

== Lean Elk becomes head of Nez Perce Tribe ==
With an intimate knowledge of Montana at his disposal, Poker Joe kept the Nez Perce in front of a quickly approaching U.S. Army for seven weeks. He pushed the Nez Perce at a hurried pace, trying to get them to safety in Canada. Lean Elk/Poker Joe took over leadership of the Nez Perce Tribe in 1877 from the Nez Perce Chief Looking Glass, after the Battle of the Big Hole left many Nez Perce injured or dead. Lean Elk had experience hunting in Montana and knew the routes the Nez Perce should take to reach the border to avoid another battle. Lean Elk's leadership style was fast-paced, pushing the Nez Perce caravan 500–700 miles from the Battle of the Big Hole to the Missouri River, and north towards the Canadian border. For a month and a half after the tribe outmaneuvered Major Guido Ilges at Fort Benton (Big Hole), Poker Joe led his people on an arduous journey toward Canada. Though the group obtained provisions at Cow Island, they proved insufficient for the long journey. Food ran low, as did bullets. Wear and tear could be seen on the tribe members’ faces, as well as their hardware, which needed replacement in the onset of cold weather.

== Removal from leadership ==
Lean Elk's traveling style left the Nez Perce caravan tired and weak. The mental and physical anguish brought on by his aggressive effort towards the North proved itself too dangerous for the group. On September 25, 1877, the council voted to bring Poker Joe's leadership to an end, and Chief Looking Glass ultimately resumed his position as leader before the Nez Perce reached the Canadian border.

== Death of Poker Joe ==
Mistaken for a Cheyenne scout, Poker Joe was accidentally killed by a fellow Nez Perce during the Battle of Bear Paw in 1877. The battle of Bear Paw took place about 40 miles from the Canadian border where the Nez Percè battled Colonel Nelson Miles and his troops.
