= Henry R. Tilton =

US Army officer and Medal of Honor recipient

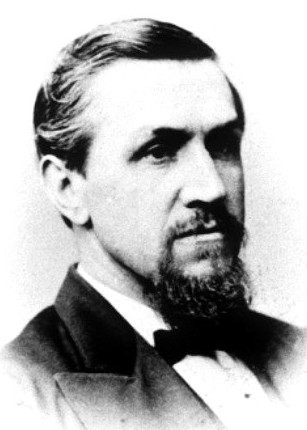
- Henry R. Tilton prior to his retirement in 1900.
- Born: February 1, 1836; Barnegat Township, New Jersey, United States
- Died: June 25, 1906 (aged 70); Sackets Harbour
- Burial place: Arlington National Cemetery
- Military career
- Allegiance: United States
- Branch: United States Army; Union Army
- Service years: 1861–1900
- Rank: Colonel
- Unit: 7th U.S. Cavalry
- Conflicts: American Civil War; Indian Wars; Nez Perce War; Great Sioux War of 1876-77; 1873 Yellowstone River Expedition
- Awards: Medal of Honor

Colonel Henry Remsen Tilton (February 1, 1836 – June 25, 1906) was an American army surgeon in the U.S. Army who saw service in the American Civil and Indian Wars. He served as an officer with the 7th U.S. Cavalry during the Nez Perce War and was cited for gallantry at the Battle of Bear Paw Mountain, in which he rescued and protected wounded soldiers, on September 30, 1877. He received the Medal of Honor for his actions almost twenty years later.

== Biography ==
=== Civil War service ===
Henry Remsen Tilton was born in Barnegat Township, New Jersey, on February 1, 1836. He graduated in medicine from the University of Pennsylvania in 1859 and, at the start of the American Civil War, enlisted in the United States Army in Jersey City as an assistant surgeon on August 26, 1861. Serving as a first lieutenant and surgeon in various federal hospitals throughout the war, he was brevetted a captain and major for "faithful and meritorious service" on March 13, 1865. After the war, Tilton became a Companion of the District of Columbia Commandery of the Military Order of the Loyal Legion of the United States.

=== Post war service ===
Tilton remained with the Army Medical Department after the war and was post surgeon at Fort Lyon in the Colorado Territory from 1866 to 1870. While at Fort Lyon in May 1868, Tilton treated Kit Carson who had fallen ill while travelling to Washington, DC. He saw his first action that same year participating in skirmishes with the Cheyenne on September 8 and again on October 7, 1868. Tilton later accompanied Colonel David S. Stanley in his expedition of the Yellowstone River in the Montana Territory in 1873. He was subsequently stationed at various frontier posts in the North Plains and, in 1876, attained the rank of major-surgeon. Tilton served under General Nelson A. Miles at Wolf Mountain, the last major battle of the Great Sioux War of 1876-77, the following year.

Within a few short months, Tilton was once again under Miles command when the Nez Perce War began that summer. Assigned to the 7th U.S. Cavalry Regiment, he later wrote an account of the campaign entitled "After the Nez Perce" published in Forest and Stream and Rod and Gun. On September 30, 1877, he won distinction at the Battle of Bear Paw Mountain against Chief Joseph and the Nez Perce by exposing himself to heavy fire to rescue and protect many wounded men on the battlefield. His actions would not be recognized by the War Department until almost twenty years later when he received the Medal of Honor on March 22, 1895.

=== Later career ===
He spent the rest of his career with the medical department as deputy surgeon general. Tilton retired from active service as a lieutenant colonel on February 2, 1900, and made a full colonel upon being placed on the retirement list.

=== Death and burial ===
He died in Sackets Harbor, New York on June 25, 1906, and was interred at Arlington National Cemetery. His wife, Anna M. Tilton, had died six months earlier and the two were buried alongside each other.

== Awards ==
- Medal of Honor
- Civil War Campaign Medal
- Indian Campaign Medal
- Spanish Campaign Medal

=== Medal of Honor citation ===
Rank and organization: Major and Surgeon, U.S. Army. Place and date: At Bear Paw Mountain, Mont., 30 September 1877. Entered service at: Jersey City, N.J. Birth: Barnegat, N.J. Date of issue: 22 March 1895.

Citation:

Fearlessly risked his life and displayed great gallantry in rescuing and protecting the wounded men.

== See also ==
- List of Medal of Honor recipients for the Indian Wars
