= Battle of Canyon Creek =

1877 battle of the Nez-Perce war

- Part of the Nez Perce War
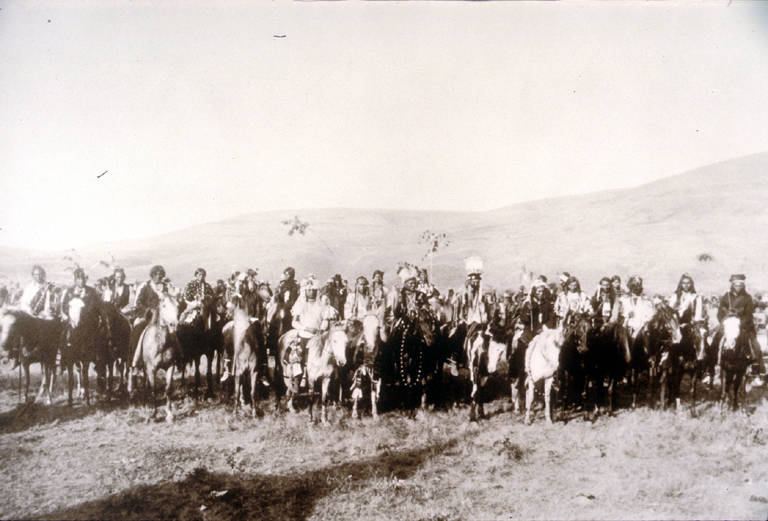
- Chief Joseph and his band in the spring of 1877.
Date	September 13, 1877
Location	Canyon Creek, Yellowstone County, Montana Territory, United States 45°46′09″N 108°48′49″W
Result	Nez Perce victory

Belligerents
United States; Crow Indians	Nez Perce

Commanders and leaders
Samuel D. Sturgis; Lewis Merrill; Frederick Benteen	Chief Joseph; Looking Glass

Strength
425 soldiers about 100 White and Indian scouts	<200

Casualties and losses
4 killed 11 wounded	3 killed 3 wounded
- Location in the United States Location in Montana Territory

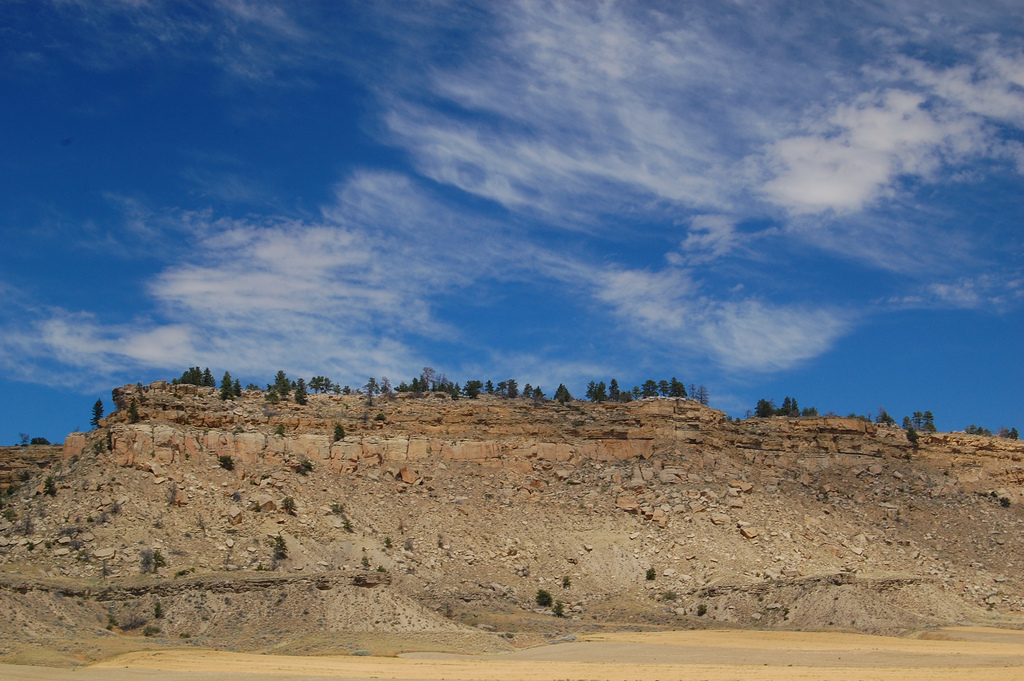
The U.S. army and cavalry fought on the ridges bordering Canyon Creek while the women, children, and horse herd of the Nez Perce escaped via the valley floor.

The Battle of Canyon Creek was a military engagement in Montana Territory between the Nez Perce Indians and the United States Army's 7th Cavalry. The battle was part of the larger Indian Wars of the latter 19th century and the immediate Nez Perce War. It took place on September 13, 1877, west of present-day Billings in Yellowstone County, in the canyons and benches around Canyon Creek.

== Background ==
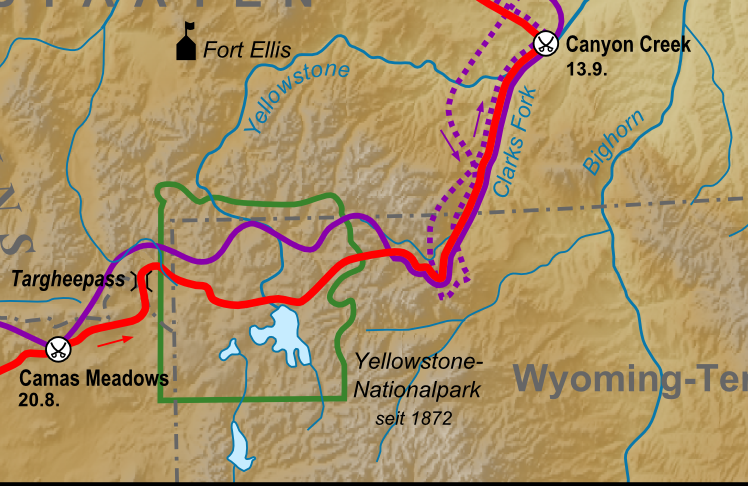
The Nez Perce route (red) from Yellowstone Park to Canyon Creek and the route of General Howard (purple) and Colonel Sturgis (dotted purple).

In June 1877, several bands of the Nez Perce, resisting relocation from their native lands on the Wallowa River in northeast Oregon to a reservation in north-central Idaho Territory on the Clearwater River, attempted to escape to the east through Idaho, Montana, and Wyoming territories, over the Rocky Mountains into the Great Plains. By September, the Nez Perce had traveled nearly one thousand miles (1,600 km) and fought several battles in which they defeated or held off the U.S. Army forces pursuing them. The Nez Perce had the mistaken notion that after crossing the next mountain range or defeating the latest army sent to oppose them they would find a peaceful new home.

After passing through Yellowstone National Park, the Nez Perce eluded the forces of Colonel Samuel D. Sturgis and followed the Clark's Fork of the Yellowstone River north out of Wyoming into Montana. Brigadier General Oliver Howard, who had chased the Nez Perce unsuccessfully for three months, ordered Sturgis to continue the pursuit. Sturgis had 360 men in six cavalry companies, divided into two battalions, one commanded by Major Lewis Merrill and the second by Captain Frederick Benteen. Howard reinforced Sturgis's 360 men with 50 additional cavalrymen, two mountain howitzers, twenty-five white scouts, and a few Bannock and Crow scouts. Howard and his soldiers, whose horses were worn out, would rest and follow a couple of days behind Sturgis.

The route of the Nez Perce had been predicated on the belief, especially by Looking Glass, that they would find asylum and safety among their friends, the Crow who lived near the Yellowstone River. Looking Glass met with representatives of both bands of the Crow on the Clark's Fork. The Crow, realizing that helping the Nez Perce would lead to retaliation on them by the U.S. army, rejected the appeal of the Nez Perce for help. Moreover, a few Crow warriors would join the army as scouts with an eye on capturing the large Nez Perce horse herd. At this point, the Nez Perce realized that their one hope for safety was to join the Sioux leader Sitting Bull in Canada, 250 miles (400 km) to their north.

In their journey down the Clark's Fork, the Nez Perce killed several prospectors and ranchers.

== The battle ==
The Yellowstone River, above and below the mouth of Clark's Fork, is bounded on the north bank by cliffs about 400 feet (120 m) high. The one passage through the cliffs was Canyon Creek. Following the creek upstream through open country, about five miles (8 km) from the Yellowstone the cliffs close in on either side and the creek splits into three forks, each running through a canyon only a few hundred feet wide with smaller side canyons. The canyons are separated by steep flat-topped ridges 300 to 500 feet (90 to 150 m) high. The narrow canyons are about six miles (10 km) long and lead to open prairie above. It was among these multiple canyons and the ridges surmounting them that the battle took place.

The Nez Perce camped on September 12 near the entrance to the narrow canyons of Canyon Creek. On the morning of September 13, many of the warriors were raiding ranches for supplies and horses up and down the Yellowstone River when they suddenly became aware that Sturgis was nearby. They had not expected him to catch them so quickly. Sturgis's men were exhausted and anticipated a rest after they crossed the Yellowstone River that morning, but Crow scouts reported the Nez Perce were moving up Canyon Creek six miles away. Seeing an opportunity, Sturgis sent Major Lewis Merrill and his battalion ahead atop a long ridge to head off the Nez Perce traversing the shallow canyon below. Benteen's battalion followed, while Sturgis stationed himself with the rear guard. Merrill was halted on the ridge by a scattering of rifle shots from Nez Perce warriors. In the words of his civilian scout, Stanton G. Fisher, Merrill's battalion dismounted and deployed "instead of charging which they should have done." According to Yellow Wolf, a single Nez Perce, Teeto Hoonod, held up the advance for a crucial ten minutes, firing 40 well-aimed shots at the cavalry from behind a rock. The caution of the soldiers was perhaps due to the formidable reputation of the Nez Perce for military prowess and marksmanship. Gale-force winds impacted marksmanship, a factor explaining low casualties on both sides.

When Sturgis arrived at the battleground, he perceived that his troops still had the possibility of capturing the Nez Perce horse herd. He sent Captain Benteen and his men on a swing to the left to plug the exits from the canyon and trap the women, children, and horses. Merrill was told to advance into the canyon to threaten the rear of the Nez Perce column, but he was held up by an increasing number of Nez Perce warriors firing at long distance at his soldiers. He succeeded only in capturing a few horses. Benteen also ran into opposition and was unable to head off the horse herd, the Nez Perce occupying high ground and firing at the soldiers. A rearguard of the Nez Perce held off the soldiers until nightfall. Most of their horse herd and their women and children reached the plains and continued north.

Fisher, among others, was "disgusted" with Sturgis's cautious management of the fight. Fisher was further disgusted when he returned to camp and found that the Crow scouts had stolen his pack animals, clothing, and bedding.

== Pursuit ==
The next day Sturgis's men were joined by an additional large number of Crow, variously estimated at between 50 and 200, riding fresh horses. They were sent ahead with Bannock scouts and, in a skirmish, succeeded in stealing about 400 of the Nez Perce horses. Sturgis and the cavalry followed behind and journeyed 37 miles (60 km) that day, but at the cost of wearing their horses down and putting themselves on foot, the Crow and Bannock declining to share their captured horses with the soldiers. After another long day of travel, but unable to catch up with the Nez Perce, Sturgis was forced to halt on the banks of the Musselshell River to await supplies and General Howard and his men who arrived there two days later.

== Aftermath ==
Without much difficulty the Nez Perce held off and escaped from a cavalry force outnumbering them at least two to one. However, the loss of about 400 horses to the Crow scouts was a blow as it placed an additional burden on their remaining and increasingly worn-out horses and slowed their flight toward Canada. They had also expended much of their scarce ammunition. The betrayal of them by the Crow was a psychological blow and after three months of a fighting retreat they were physically exhausted.

Sturgis's casualties in the long-range battle were three killed and eleven wounded, one of them mortally. Martha Jane Cannary, better known as "Calamity Jane," accompanied the wounded by boat down the Yellowstone River as a nurse. Sturgis claimed to have killed sixteen Nez Perce, but Yellow Wolf said that the Nez Perce had only one warrior and two old men killed, and those by the Crow. He said that three Nez Perce were wounded by the soldiers.

1st Cavalry soldiers praised the valor of 7th Cavalry lieutenants William Jones Nicholson, George D. Wallace, and John Chowning Gresham, which led to Benteen officially commending them in his written report.

Today, the site is included as part of Nez Perce National Historical Park

== Order of battle ==
Nez Perce

Tribal nation	Leaders	Fighters
Nez Perce	Chief Joseph (diplomatic leader); Looking Glass (war leader), others	150-200 Fighters

United States Army

September 13, 1877, Colonel Samuel D. Sturgis, commanding.

Expedition	Regiment	Companies and Others
Colonel Samuel D. Sturgis, commanding	Merrill's Battalion, 7th Cavalry Major Lewis Merrill	Company F, 7th United States Cavalry Regiment: Captain James M. Bell; Company I, 7th United States Cavalry Regiment: Captain Henry J. Nowlan; Company L, 7th United States Cavalry Regiment: First Lieutenant John W. Wilkinson
Colonel Samuel D. Sturgis, commanding	Benteen's Battalion, 7th Cavalry Captain Frederick Benteen	Company G, 7th United States Cavalry Regiment: First Lieutenant George D. Wallace; Company H, 7th United States Cavalry Regiment: Second Lieutenant Ezra B. Fuller; Company M, 7th United States Cavalry Regiment: Captain Thomas H. French
Colonel Samuel D. Sturgis, commanding	Scouts and Guides About 100 men	Bannock scouts; Crow scouts; About 25 white scouts
Colonel Samuel D. Sturgis, commanding	Reinforcements Captain Charles Bendire	Company C, 1st United States Cavalry Regiment (detachment): Attached to Company K; Company K, 1st United States Cavalry Regiment: Captain Charles Bendire; Detachment (1 howitzer), 4th United States Artillery Regiment:
