= Kooskia National Fish Hatchery =

Coordinates: 46.1297°N 115.9468°W

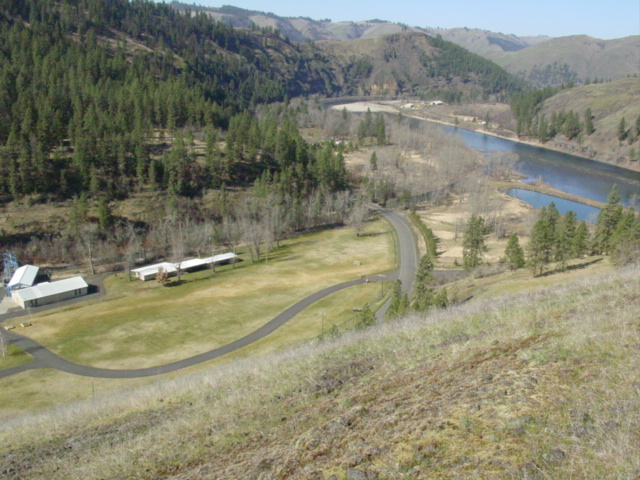

Kooskia National Fish Hatchery is a "mitigation" hatchery located on the Clearwater River within the Nez Perce Indian Reservation near Kooskia, in north-central Idaho. Construction began in 1966 by the Army Corps of Engineers. With funding provided by the United States per a water rights settlement the hatchery is managed and operated by the Nez Perce Tribe. The production goal is to raise and release up to 600,000 juvenile spring Chinook salmon annually.

The fish hatchery was the site of Looking Glass's village which was attacked on July 1, 1877 by U.S. army soldiers. Looking Glass subsequently joined Chief Joseph to become a leader in the Nez Perce War. A plaque describing the event and a nature trail on the site have been established by the Nez Perce.
