= Battle of the Big Hole =

1877 battle of the Nez Perce War

- Part of the Nez Perce War
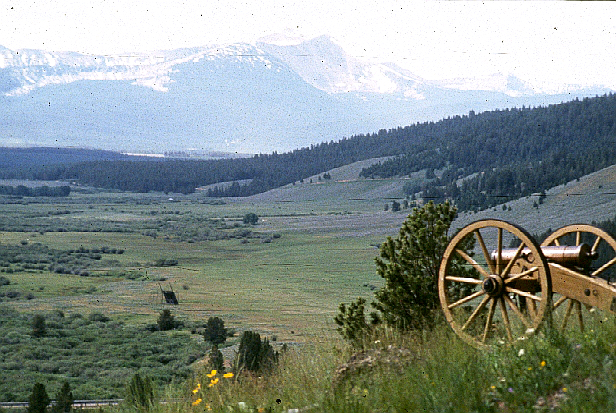
- Big Hole battlefield
Date	9–10 August 1877
Location	Beaverhead County, Montana Territory 45°38′51″N 113°39′03″W
Result	Inconclusive

Belligerents
United States	Nez Perce

Commanders and leaders
John Gibbon (Colonel)	Chief Joseph; Looking Glass

Strength
206	200 warriors

Casualties and losses
31 killed 38 wounded	70–90 killed of whom perhaps thirty were warriors.
- Location in the United States Location in Montana Territory

The Battle of the Big Hole was fought in Montana Territory, August 9–10, 1877, between the United States Army and the Nez Perce tribe of Native Americans during the Nez Perce War. Both sides suffered heavy casualties. The Nez Perce withdrew in good order from the battlefield and continued their long fighting retreat that would result in their attempt to reach Canada and asylum.

Located in Beaverhead County, the battle site is between the continental divide at Chief Joseph Pass and the town of Wisdom.

== Background ==
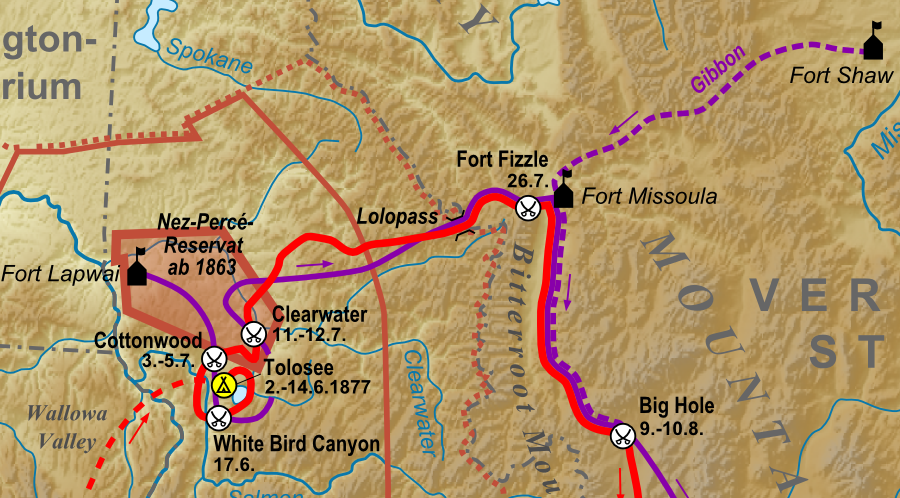
The route of the Nez Perce (red) and the U.S. Army (purple) to the Battle of the Big Hole. General Howard's route is shown as a solid line, Gibbon's as a dotted line.

After the Battle of the Clearwater in Idaho Territory on July 11–12, the Nez Perce leaders led their people on an extensive trek to escape the soldiers of Brigadier General Oliver Otis Howard. The Nez Perce crossed into Montana Territory via rugged Lolo Pass, and after a brief confrontation at Fort Fizzle on July 28, they entered the Bitterroot Valley and proceeded southward. Looking Glass seems to have taken over leadership from Chief Joseph; he pledged to the white settlers in the Bitterroot Valley that the Nez Perce would pass through their valley without violence and they did so, even trading and purchasing supplies from white merchants.

Looking Glass persuaded the Nez Perce that Howard was far behind and that the citizens of Montana did not want war with them. Thus, their progress was leisurely and they took few precautions for defense, not sending out scouts or setting pickets to guard their encampments. They left the Bitterroot Valley, crossed a mountain range, and camped in the Big Hole Basin, pausing to replenish their tipi poles from the surrounding forest. The Nez Perce numbered about 750 people in all with about 200 warriors.

Unknown to the Nez Perce, Colonel John Gibbon had left Fort Shaw with 161 officers and men and one howitzer. Following the trail of the Nez Perce he collected 45 civilian volunteers in the Bitterroot Valley. On August 8, a detachment led by Lieutenant James Bradley discovered the Nez Perce camp along the North Fork of the Big Hole River. That night Gibbon marched overland to the Nez Perce camp, reaching it at dawn, leaving his twelve-pound (5.4 kg) howitzer and a pack train to follow behind with a guard of twenty men. He had come to fight: his orders were no prisoners and no negotiations.

== Battle ==
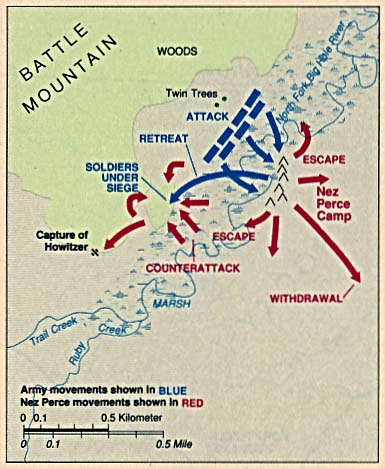
Map of Battle of the Big Hole

Between Gibbon's position and the Nez Perce encampment, which consisted of 89 tipis in a V-shaped pattern, was the waist-deep and willow-lined North Fork of the Big Hole River. Approaching the Nez Perce encampment on foot at dawn, Gibbon's men encountered an old Nez Perce man and killed him. The soldiers crossed the river and rushed into the village and began firing into the tipis where most of the Nez Perce were still sleeping. The Indians were taken by surprise and fled in all directions. Gibbon's men fired indiscriminately at men, women, and children – although some of the women were said to have been armed and shooting back at the soldiers. Lieutenant James H. Bradley, leading Gibbon's left wing, was killed early in the battle. Leaderless, his men did not continue their advance and left the northern part of the village unoccupied, giving a refuge and a rallying point to the Nez Perce.

Gibbon halted his men in their pursuit, not wishing his force to be scattered, and ordered them to burn the tipis. This proved difficult to do and the pause gave the Nez Perce time to regroup. The voices of White Bird and Looking Glass rallying their men from the opposite end of the village were heard by the soldiers. From sheltered positions the Nez Perce began to return fire. Gibbon's horse was hit and he was wounded in the leg and several other soldiers were killed. As usual, the Nez Perce's marksmanship was excellent – although, according to the warrior Yellow Wolf, most of the Nez Perce warriors had fled without their weapons and only a few were armed.

Twenty minutes after his entry into the village, Gibbon, realizing that he was in an "untenable position", ordered a retreat across the river to a timbered area 300 or 400 yards distant and out of view of the village. The soldiers dug rifle pits and constructed rock and log barriers. At this point Gibbon's howitzer appeared on the battlefield and fired two or three ineffectual rounds. The Nez Perce killed or wounded most of the howitzer crew, who abandoned the gun, but not before dismantling it.

Gibbon feared that the Nez Perce, who he believed outnumbered him, although they probably did not, would overrun his position, but instead the battle settled down into a sniping duel between about 60 Nez Perce under Ollokot and the soldiers. The Nez Perce had collected arms and ammunition left behind by the soldiers in their retreat. At one point the Nez Perce set fires and attempted to burn the soldiers out of their position, but the wind shifted and the fire burned itself out. That afternoon the Nez Perce continued sniping at the soldiers while their women packed up, gathered the horse herd, and moved out south, going about 18 miles to Lake Creek where they made camp – this time with defensive works.

Gibbon had serious problems that night. His men had no food, save a dead horse, no water, and many seriously wounded men to tend to. A little water was obtained from the river by volunteers who crept through the Indian lines. Several of the civilian volunteers had had enough of the battle and slipped away. Gibbon sent out messengers to search for the much larger force of Howard, who was following him, and request immediate relief.

The next day, August 10, twenty to thirty Nez Perce sharpshooters kept the soldiers holed up in their fortifications all day. The Nez Perce warriors left that night, leaving Gibbon and his soldiers alone but immobile on the battlefield. Howard, and an advance party of 29 cavalrymen and 17 Bannock scouts, found Gibbon the next morning after a 71-mile (114 km) ride in a day and a night.

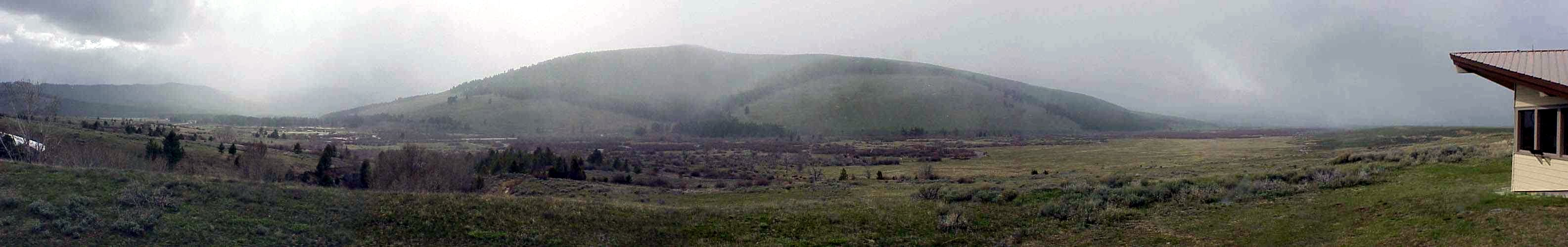
Big Hole Battlegrounds, 2003

== Casualties ==
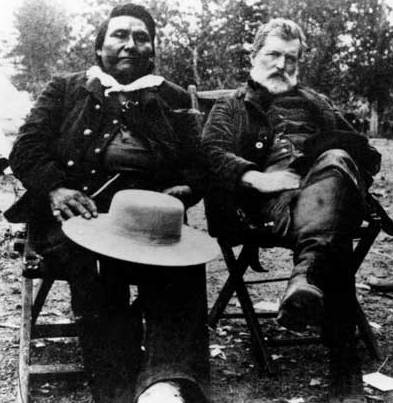
Chief Joseph and Col. John Gibbon met again on the Big Hole Battle site in 1889

The battle was costly for both sides. Gibbon's force was unfit to pursue the Nez Perce. Gibbon suffered 29 dead (23 soldiers and six civilian volunteers) and 40 wounded (36 soldiers and four civilians) of whom two later died. His casualties amounted to more than 30 percent of his force. No precise estimate of Nez Perce casualties exists although their total dead probably amounted to between 70 and 90, of whom less than 33 were warriors and most were women and children. Yellow Wolf claimed that only 12 "real fighters, but our best" died in the battle. Chief Joseph and his brother Ollokot's wives were wounded.

== Aftermath ==
Gibbon's success in surprising the Nez Perce caused Looking Glass's prestige as a leader to plummet. He had promised them they would be safe in Montana and instead nearly every Nez Perce family had suffered a loss in the battle. Chief Joseph seems to have resumed his role as the principal leader of the Nez Perce although Looking Glass would continue to be a battlefield leader.

For the Nez Perce the losses in the battle were grievous. They had anticipated that, by leaving Idaho, they might leave the war behind them and live peacefully. Now, they knew that they could expect no quarter in future battles. Howard's forces, newly arrived on the battlefield, took up the pursuit and followed Joseph toward Yellowstone National Park. The Nez Perce again clashed with the army ten days later on August 20 at the Battle of Camas Meadows.

Gibbon recommended Captain John T. Van Orsdale for the Medal of Honor for heroism at Big Hole; in February 1890, his galalntry was recognized with a brevet promotion to first lieutenant.

The battlefield is preserved in the Big Hole National Battlefield unit of the Nez Perce National Historical Park, located along State Highway 43.

== Order of Battle ==
District of Western Montana: Colonel John Gibbon
7th U.S. Infantry

- Left Battalion
  - Company A: Captain William Logan, in reserve
  - Company K: Captain James M. J. Sanno
  - Company D: Captain Richard Comba, senior battalion officer
  - Scouts and Volunteers: Lieutenant James H. Bradley
  - Bitterroot Civilian Volunteers: "Captain" John B. Catlin, attached to Bradley's command
- Right Battalion
  - Company F: Captain Constant Williams
  - Company G: Captain George Browning
  - Company I: Captain Charles C. Rawn, senior battalion officer

2nd U.S. Cavalry

- Company L, detachment: (attached to Bradley's command)

Artillery

- 12lb Mountain Howitzer: Sgt Daley, Sgt Fredericks

== Sources ==
- Dillon, Richard H. (1983). North American Indian Wars. New York: Facts on File. ISBN 978-0871966414.
- Greene, Jerome A. (2000). Nez Perce summer, 1877: The U.S. Army and the Nee-Me-Poo Crisis. Helena: Montana Historical Society Press. ISBN 978-0917298820.
