= John Chowning Gresham =

United States Army officer and Medal of Honor recipient

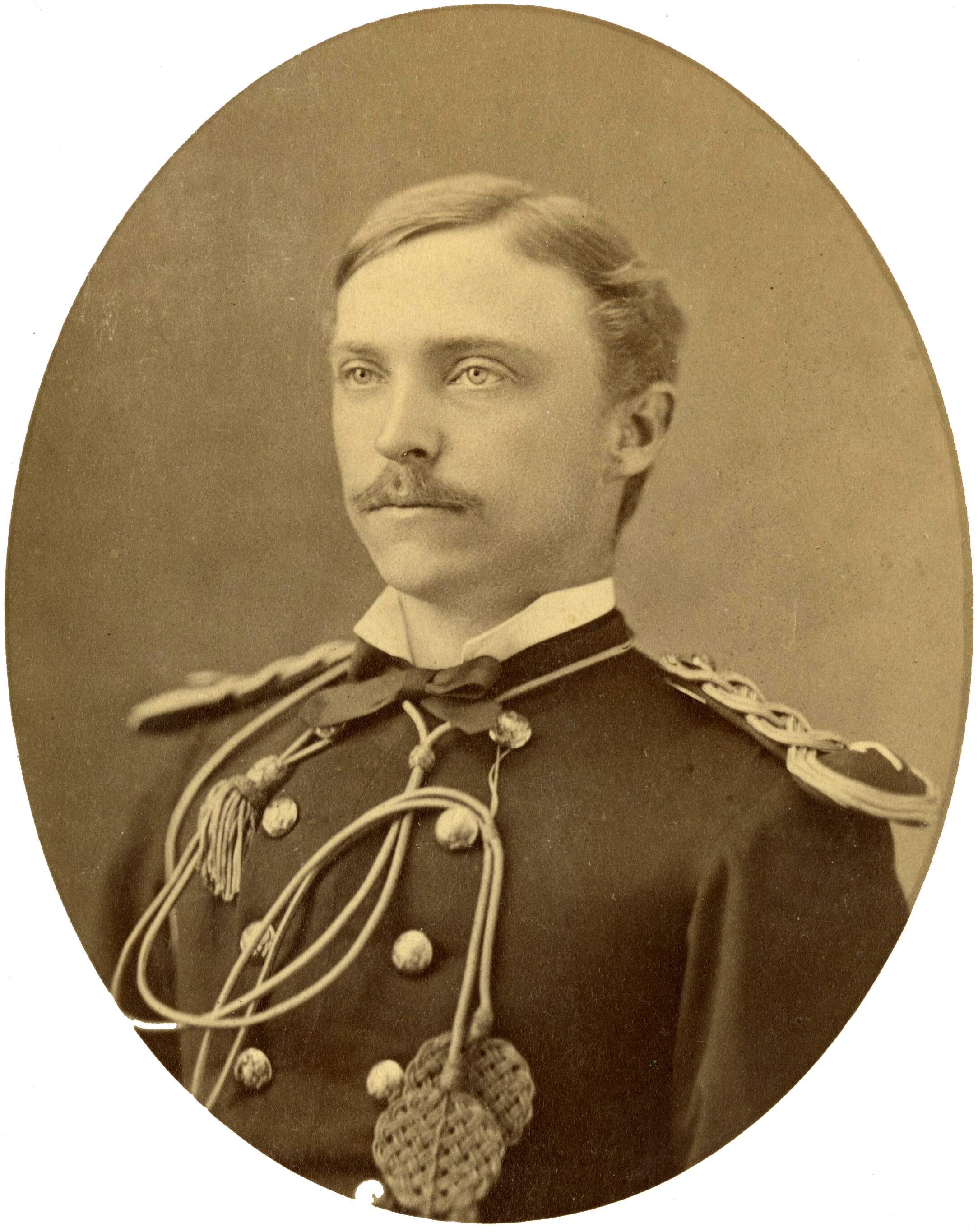
- Gresham, c. 1878
- Born: September 25, 1851; Lancaster County, Virginia
- Died: September 2, 1926 (aged 74); San Diego, California
- Burial place: San Francisco National Cemetery
- Military career
- Allegiance: United States of America
- Branch: United States Army; California National Guard
- Service years: 1876–1915 (Army); 1915–1918 (National Guard)
- Rank: Colonel
- Unit: 7th Cavalry Regiment
- Commands: 10th Cavalry Regiment
- Conflicts: Indian Wars; Battle of Canyon Creek; Wounded Knee Massacre; Philippine–American War
- Awards: Medal of Honor

John Chowning Gresham (September 25, 1851 – September 2, 1926) was an officer in the United States Army who was a recipient of the Medal of Honor for his actions during the Wounded Knee Massacre as part of the Indian Wars.

After graduating from the US Military Academy (West Point) he accepted a commission in the United States Army and saw combat in several battles during the American Indian wars including the Battle of Canyon Creek. He was assigned to the Department of Dakota until 1884 when he was assigned to the Virginia Agricultural College as a professor of Military Science and Tactics.

In 1887 he returned to the campaigns against the Indians where he was injured and received his Medal of Honor for his actions during the Wounded Knee Massacre.

After retiring in 1915 he was recalled to active duty to command the ROTC and SATC programs at the University of Denver as a member of the California National Guard until the programs were disbanded in 1918. He died in San Diego, California in 1926 and is buried in San Francisco National Cemetery.

== Life and career ==
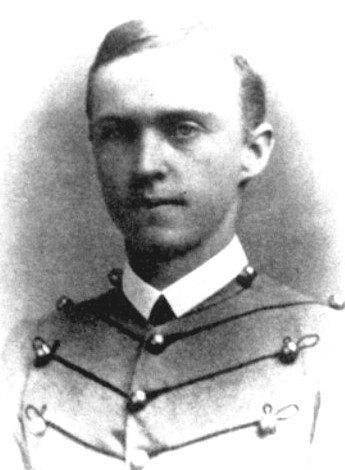
Gresham in West Point

Gresham was born September 25, 1851, in Lancaster County, Virginia, and graduated from the United States Military Academy in 1876. He was commissioned a second lieutenant in the 3rd Cavalry at Fort Lincoln. He transferred to the 7th Cavalry as a replacement following the Battle of Little Big Horn, and served in the Nez Perce War, including the Battle of Canyon Creek. He was promoted to first lieutenant in June 1878, and continued to serve at various posts within the Department of Dakota until September 1884. From September 1884 to February 1887 he was Professor of Military Science and Tactics at Virginia Agricultural College.

In 1887 Gresham returned to duty with the 7th Cavalry and participated in the campaign against the Sioux in the Wounded Knee Massacre, leading a party into a ravine to attack a group of Indians hiding there. For this action he received the Medal of Honor in March 1895.

He was promoted to captain in April 1892 and moved with the regiment to Arizona. He served as Professor of Military Science and Tactics at the North Carolina College of Agriculture and Mechanical Arts from December 1896 until rejoining the regiment in Havana in March 1899.

Gresham was promoted to major of the 6th Cavalry in September 1901, and in January 1902 he sailed for Manila to join the regiment. He served with the 6th Cavalry in the Philippines until August 1903, including General J. Franklin Bell's campaign against Miguel Malvar. He transferred to the 15th Cavalry and returned to the United States. He returned to the Philippines with the 15th Cavalry in October 1905, serving there until July 1906. He transferred to the 9th Cavalry and again returned to the U. S. In July 1907 he was promoted to lieutenant colonel of the 14th Cavalry and given command of the regiment and the post of Boise Barracks. The regiment was sent to Fort Stotsenburg in the Philippines in March 1910.

Gresham was promoted to colonel in August 1911, and, in April 1912 took command of the 10th Cavalry at Fort Ethan Allen, Vermont. In December 1913 he took command of Fort Huachuca, Arizona. He was in charge of militia affairs for the Western Department from August 1914 until he retired in September 1915. However, he was immediately assigned to active duty with the California National Guard in Los Angeles, and beginning in January 1918, he commanded the ROTC and SATC programs at the University of Denver, until they were disbanded in December 1918.

He was a member of the Sons of the American Revolution.

Colonel Gresham died September 2, 1926, in San Diego, California, and is buried in San Francisco National Cemetery.

== Medal of Honor citation ==
Rank and organization: First Lieutenant, 7th U.S. Cavalry. Place and date: Wounded Knee Creek, S. Dak., 29 December 1890. Entered service at: Lancaster Courthouse, Va.. Birth: Virginia. Date of issue: 26 March 1895.

Citation:

Voluntarily led a party into a ravine to dislodge Sioux Indians concealed therein. He was wounded during this action.

== Controversy ==
Mass Grave for the Dead Lakota After the Engagement at Wounded Knee

There have been several attempts by various parties to rescind the Medals of Honor awarded in connection with the Battle of Wounded Knee. Proponents claim that the engagement was in-fact a massacre and not a battle, due to the high number of killed and wounded Lakota women and children and the very one-sided casualty counts. Estimates of the Lakota losses indicate 150–300 killed, of which up to 200 were women and children. Additionally, as many as 51 were wounded. In contrast, the 7th Cavalry suffered 25 killed and 39 wounded, many being the result of friendly fire.

Calvin Spotted Elk, direct descendant of Chief Spotted Elk killed at Wounded Knee, launched a petition to rescind medals from the soldiers who participated in the battle.

The Army has also been criticized more generally for the seemingly disproportionate number of Medals of Honor awarded in connection with the battle. For comparison, 20 Medals were awarded at Wounded Knee, 21 at the Battle of Cedar Creek, and 20 at the Battle of Antietam. Respectively, Cedar Creek and Antietam involved 52,712 and 113,000 troops, suffering 8,674 and 22,717 casualties. Wounded Knee, however, involved 610 combatants and resulted in as many as 705 casualties (including non-combatants).

== See also ==
- List of Medal of Honor recipients for the Indian Wars
- List of United States Military Academy alumni (Medal of Honor)
