= Toohoolhoolzote =

Nez Perce leader

- Toohoolhoozote (Sound made when striking any vibrant timber or metal with a hard substance)

Nez Perce Pikunan band leader

Personal details
- Born: c. 1820s
- Died: September 30, 1877 Bear Paw Mountains, Montana
- Cause of death: Battle of Bear Paw
- Known for: Nez Perce War

Toohoolhoolzote (born c. 1820s, died September 30, 1877) was a Nez Perce leader who fought in the Nez Perce War. He fought after first advocating peace, and died at the Battle of Bear Paw.

== Representative leader ==
At a winter meeting in 1876, Toohoolhoolzote had been appointed the head speaker for the Nez Perce bands of Joseph, Looking Glass, White Bird and his own for the coming meeting with U.S. Army General Oliver O. Howard. The leaders allowed him to speak for them, and to deny or allow the military's demands.

=== Numbers by band ===
In the upcoming conflict his following of 50 people was fourth in size after Joseph's (about 300 people), White Bird (about 250 people), and Looking Glass (about 70 people). These Nez Perce bands totaled about 660 men, women and children. Of those fewer than 200 were men. About half that number were considered in prime warrior age. As the conflict progressed, more bands would join, with a maximum fighting strength of 250 or less. This includes about 25 Palus men under the chief Hahtalekin (also known as Taktsoukt Jlppilp - "Echo" or "Red Echo") and Husishusis Kute (Husis Husis Kute, Hush-hush-cute - "Bald Head", "Naked Head").

== Native Americans' concerns ==
One of the major concerns of the leaders was that they have sufficient time to prepare to leave and to move their livestock. They wanted to wait until autumn as a minimum, or ideally, a year. Toohoolhoolzote also expressed the natives' reluctance to sell their land, which went against their religious beliefs.

== Conflict ==
The military, on the other hand, demanded that they be moved in 30 days, or the soldiers would use force. General Oliver O. Howard put this to them strongly, after Toohoolhoolzote began to speak on the sacredness of the Earth to his people:

"I do not want to hear you say anything more like that. I am telling you! Thirty days you have to get on the reservation."

"You ask me to talk, then tell me to say no more, Toohoolhoolzote replied. "I am chief! I ask no man to come and tell me anything what I must do. I am chief here!"

General Howard answered sharp. "Yes, you are chief. I am telling you! Thirty days you have to move in... I am the man to tell you what you must do! You will come on the reservation within time I tell you. If not, soldiers will put you there or shoot you down!"

Toohoolhoolzote stood up to General Howard, and told him he would not obey. Yellow Wolf reported the final words:

Chief Toohoolhoolzote did not become afraid. His words were strong as he replied, "I hear you! I have simiakia, that which belongs to a man! I am a man, and will not go! I will not leave my home, the land where I grew up!" For this he was jailed.

This arrest was one of the events which ultimately led to the war.

=== Simiakia ===
Toohoolhoolzote's use of the Nez Perce word simiakia is not clearly defined anywhere online. The following quotations illustrate some of its meaning. The quotes are from contemporary times, long after Toohoolhoolzote uttered the word.

It is simiakia, the Nez Perce way, our inner pride of Indian manhood...

...staring down all that bitter talk and all those menacing white rifles with nothing save his Nez Perce simiakia, his terrible Indian pride...

This blind pride was my father's blood, the simiakia of my untamed ancestors entering into me.

...stood up above the pit to show the power of his personal simiakia, his faith, his own medicine. Nothing could harm him...

== Faith ==
As a follower of the Dreamer Faith, he tried to be a pacifist. The Dreamer religion called for throwing off white culture peacefully, by rejecting it and not participating in it. Yellow Wolf said of him:

He told how the land always belonged to the Indians, how it came down to us from our fathers. How the earth was a great law, how everything must remain as fixed by the Earth-Chief. How the land must not be sold! That we came from the earth, and our bodies must go back to earth, our mother.

Although he advocated for peace, when pushed he became a strong fighter, labeled "fighter from hell" by writers of the era.

== Name ==
According to the Nez Perce dictionary, Toohoolhoolzote was a transliteration of tukulkulcúᐧt, which meant antelope.
