= Idaho Territory =

Territory of the U.S. between 1863–1890

Coordinates: 44.06°N 114.74°W

Idaho
- Organized incorporated territory of the United States
- 1863–1890
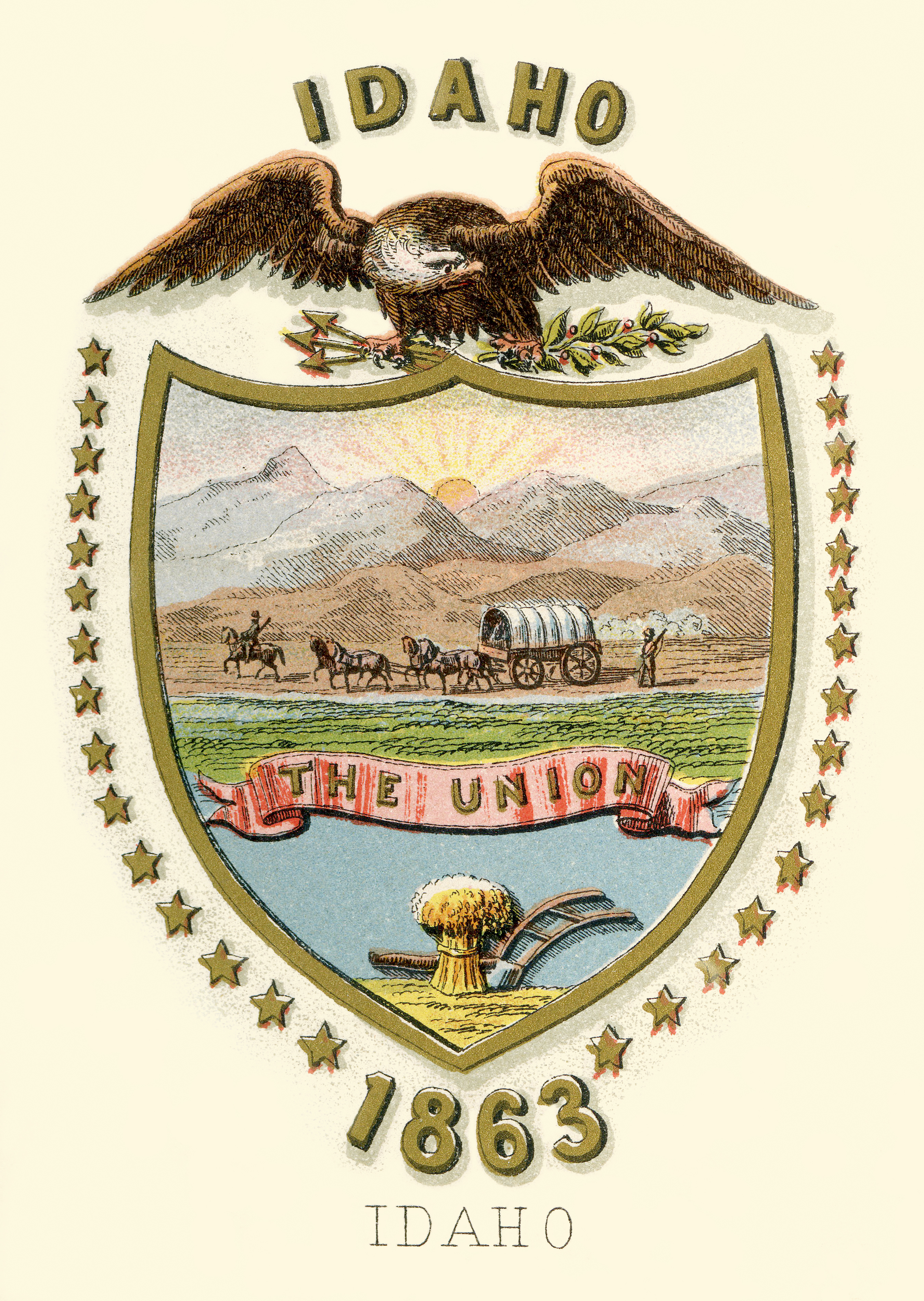
- Coat of arms of the Idaho Territory (1863–1866)

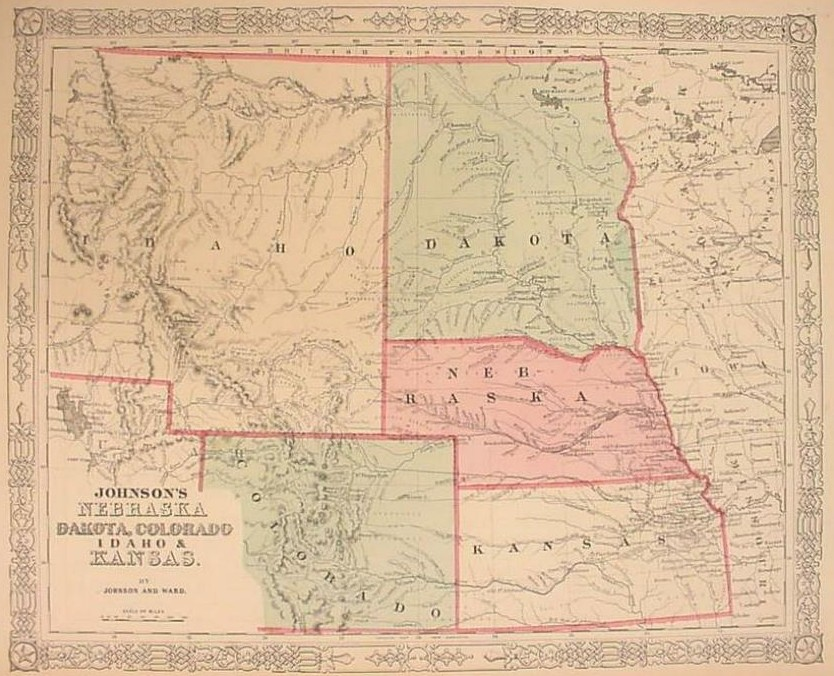
- Map of Territory of Idaho
- Capital: Lewiston (1863–1866); Boise (1866–1890)
- Government
  - Type: Organized incorporated territory
- Governor
  - First: William H. Wallace
  - Last: George L. Shoup
- History
  - Split from Dakota, Nebraska, and Washington territories: March 3, 1863
  - Montana Territory split off & land ceded to Dakota Territory: May 28, 1864
  - Wyoming Territory formed: July 25, 1868
  - Statehood: July 3, 1890
Preceded by
Washington Territory
Dakota Territory
Succeeded by
Montana Territory
Dakota Territory
Wyoming Territory
Idaho

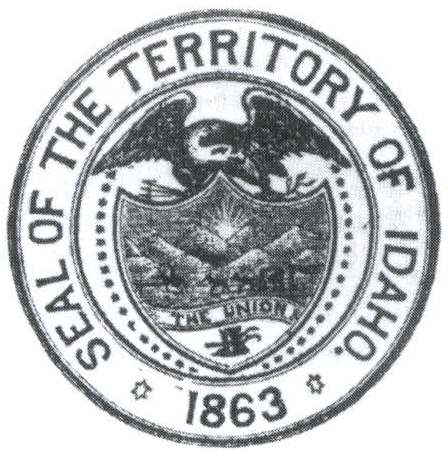
Seal of the Idaho Territory, 1863–1866

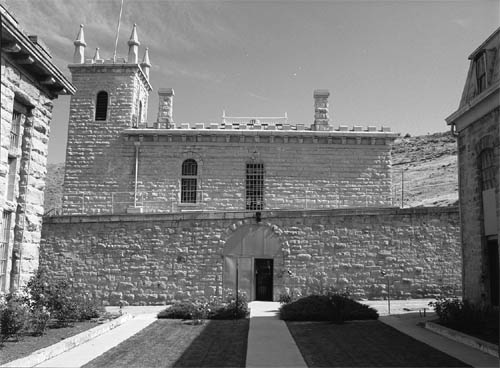
Old Penitentiary's entrance

The Territory of Idaho was an organized incorporated territory of the United States that existed for over 27 years, from March 3, 1863, until July 3, 1890, when the final extent of the territory was admitted to the Union as the state of Idaho.

== History ==
Historical population
Year	Pop.	±%
1870	14,999	—
1880	32,610	+117.4%
1890	88,548	+171.5%
Source: 1870–1890;

=== 1860s ===
The territory was officially organized on March 3, 1863, by Act of Congress, and signed into law by President Abraham Lincoln. It is a successor region that was created by areas from existing territories undergoing parallel political transitions beginning with disputes over which country owned the region (See Oregon Country). By 1863, the area west of the Continental Divide that was formerly part of the huge Oregon Territory had been sundered from the coastal Washington Territory north of the young state of Oregon (1859) to the far west and the remnant of the Oregon Territory was officially "unorganized". Most of the area east of the Continental Divide had been part of the loosely defined Dakota Territory ending along the 49th parallel—now the border with Canada, then a colonial possession of Great Britain.

The original newly organized territory covered all of the present-day states of Idaho and Montana and almost all of Wyoming, omitting only a corner in the state's extreme southwest portion. It was wholly spanned east-to-west by the bustling Oregon Trail and partly by the other emigrant trails, the California Trail and Mormon Trail which since hitting stride in 1847, had been conveying settler wagon trains to the west, and incidentally, across the continental divide into the Snake River Basin, a key gateway into the Idaho and Oregon Country interiors.

The first territorial capital was at Lewiston, from 1863 to 1866; Boise was made the territorial capital in 1866 by a one-vote margin of the territorial supreme court. Congress failed to provide official criminal or civic codes for the Idaho territory upon its inception, so it was not until January 4, 1864, that the territory's original laws were adopted.

The upheaval caused by the Civil War and Reconstruction was a distant concern to those in the comparatively stable Idaho Territory, a situation which encouraged settlement.

In 1864, the Montana Territory was organized from the northeastern section of the territory east of the Bitterroot Range. Most of the southeastern area of the territory was made part of the Dakota Territory.

In the late 1860s, Idaho Territory became a destination for displaced Southern Democrats who fought for the Confederacy during the Civil War. These people were well represented in the early territorial legislatures, which often clashed with the appointed Republican territorial governors. The political infighting became particularly vicious in 1867 when Governor David W. Ballard asked for protection from federal troops stationed at Fort Boise against the territorial legislature. By 1870, however, the political infighting had decreased considerably.

In 1868, the areas east of the 111th meridian west became the newly created Wyoming Territory, and Idaho Territory assumed the boundaries of the modern state. The discovery of gold, silver, and other valuable natural resources throughout Idaho beginning in the 1860s, as well as the completion of the transcontinental railroad in 1869, brought many new people to the territory, including Chinese laborers who came to work the mines. As Idaho approached statehood, mining and other extractive industries became increasingly important to its economy. By the 1890s, for example, Idaho exported more lead than any other state, primarily extracted from the Silver Valley.

=== 1870s ===
Construction began on the Idaho Territorial Prison in 1870; completed by 1872, it was in use for over a century as the state penitentiary, until late 1973. Placed on the National Register of Historic Places in 1974 for its significance as a territorial prison; the site currently contains museums and an arboretum.

Almost immediately after Idaho Territory was created, a public school system was created and stage coach lines were established. Regular newspapers were active in Lewiston, Boise and Silver City by 1865. The first telegraph line reached Franklin in 1866, with Lewiston being the first town linked in northern Idaho in 1874. The first telephone call in the Pacific Northwest was made on May 10, 1878, in Lewiston.

Although forming a sizable minority, members of the Church of Jesus Christ of Latter-day Saints in Idaho were held in suspicion by others in Idaho. By 1882, notable and powerful Idahoans successfully disenfranchised members of the Church of Jesus Christ of Latter-day Saints voters in Idaho Territory, citing their illegal practice of polygamy. Idaho was able to achieve statehood some six years before Utah, a territory which had a larger population and had been settled longer, but was majority members of the Church of Jesus Christ of Latter-day Saints with voting polygamists.

There were four thousand Chinese living in the Idaho Territory from 1869 to 1875. Like many Chinese immigrants, they came to "Gold Mountain" to work as miners, or found work as laundrymen and cooks. The 1870 census reported there were 1,751 Chinese in Idaho City who were nearly half of city residents.

The Nez Perce War began in the north-central portion of the territory at White Bird Canyon in June 1877, and concluded four months later in eastern Montana Territory at Bear Paw.

=== 1880s ===
After the capital relocation controversy, proposals to split the two regions became widespread. For the rest of the decade, Idaho Territory was nearly legislated out of existence. In 1885, the Idaho legislature published a bipartisan memorial to Congress asking for northern Idaho to be returned to Washington Territory. There were two attempts during the 49th Congress to accomplish this. On March 1, 1887 Congress sent a bill to President Grover Cleveland which would have returned northern Idaho to Washington Territory. Cleveland, likely as a favor to Governor Edward A. Stevenson, refused to sign the bill and it was pocket vetoed when the session of Congress ended two days later. Nevada and Utah showed interest in acquiring the remainders of southern Idaho.

In 1889, the University of Idaho was awarded to the northern town of Moscow instead of its original planned location at Eagle Rock (now Idaho Falls) in the south. This served to alleviate some of the hard feelings felt by North Idaho residents over losing the capital.

In a bid for statehood, Governor Stevenson called for a constitutional convention in 1889. The convention approved a constitution on August 6, 1889, and voters approved the constitution on November 5, 1889. President Benjamin Harrison signed the law admitting Idaho as a U.S. state on July 3, 1890.

== Territorial change ==
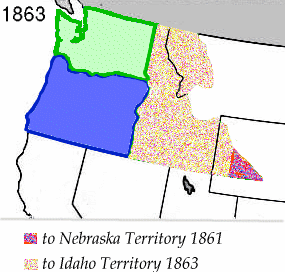
The State of Oregon (blue) and Washington Territory (green)—along with the latter's portions ceded to Nebraska Territory on March 2, 1861, and to Idaho Territory on March 3, 1863

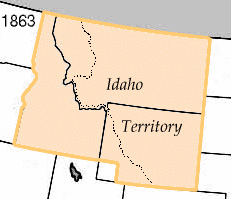
The Idaho Territory in 1863

The Idaho Territory in 1864

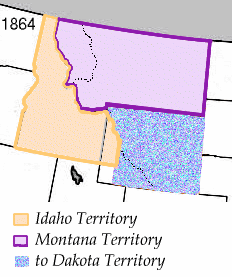
Areas ceded to the Montana and Dakota Territories in 1864

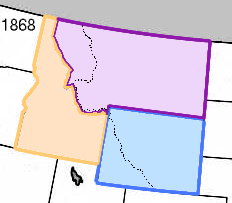
The Idaho, Montana, and Wyoming Territories in 1868

== See also ==
- History of Chinese Americans in Idaho
- Idaho in the American Civil War
- California Trail
- Historic regions of the United States
- History of Idaho
- Oregon Trail
- Oregon Treaty, 1846
- Territorial evolution of the United States
- State of Deseret, 1849–1850 (extralegal)
- Territory of Jefferson, 1859–1861 (extralegal)
