= Looking Glass (Native American leader) =

Nez Percé War leader

- Allalimya Takanin
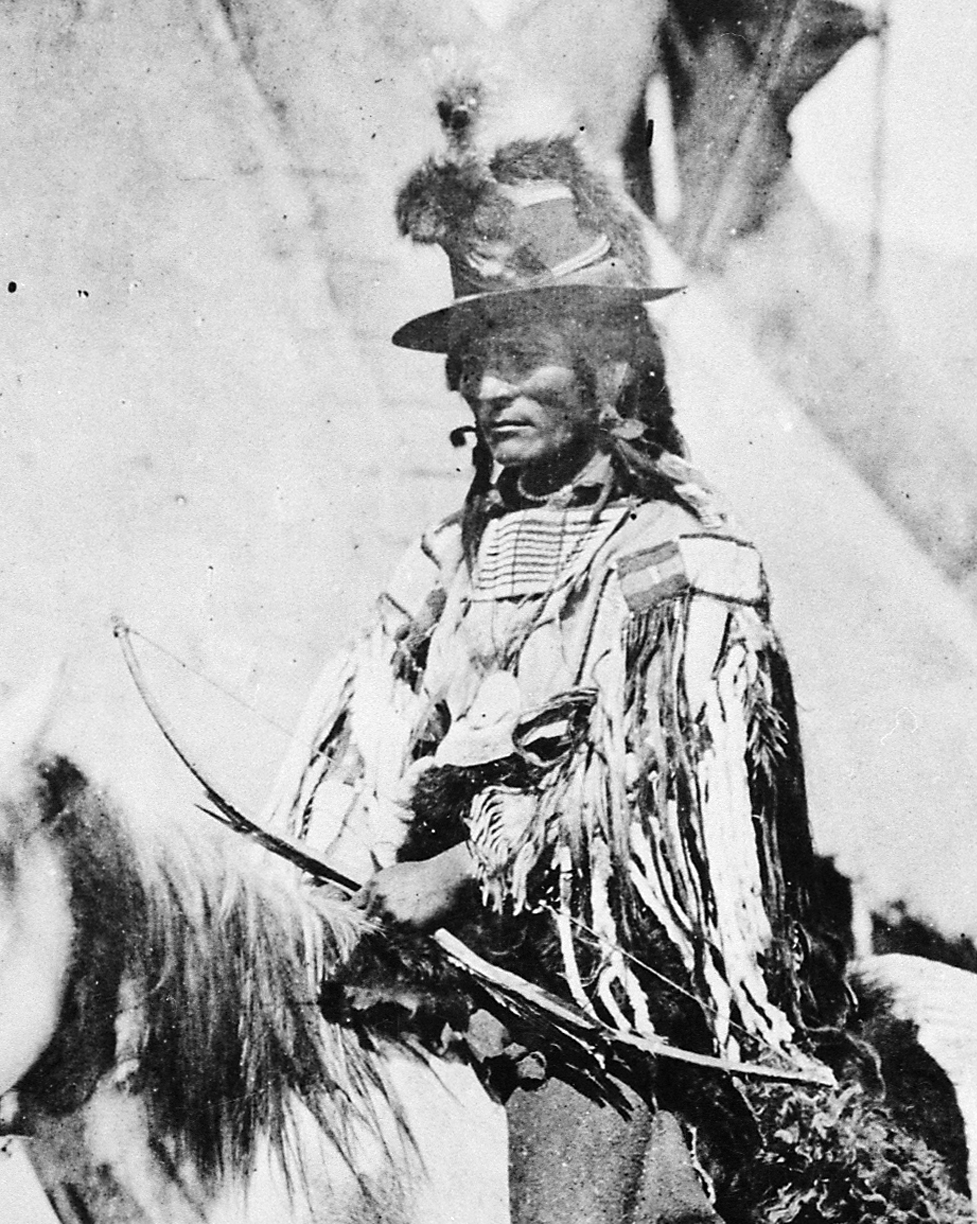
- Looking Glass, Nez Perce leader

Nez Perce leader

Personal details
- Born: c. 1832 Montana
- Died: October 5, 1877 (aged 44–45) Bear's Paw Mountains battlefield
- Known for: Nez Perce War

Military service
- Battles/wars: Bear Paw

Looking Glass (Allalimya Takanin c. 1832–1877) was a principal Nez Perce architect of many of the military strategies employed by the Nez Perce during the Nez Perce War of 1877. He, along with Chief Joseph, directed the 1877 retreat from eastern Oregon into Montana and onward toward the Canada–US border during the Nez Perce War. He led the Alpowai band of the Nez Perce, which included the communities of Asotin, Alpowa, and Sapachesap along the Clearwater River in Idaho. He inherited his name from his father, the prominent Nez Percé chief Apash Wyakaikt ("Flint Necklace") or Ippakness Wayhayken ("Looking Glass Around Neck") and was therefore called by the whites Looking Glass. He was also known as Alalimya Takanin, a name referring to a "spirit-formed man" who rode a high wind.

== Nez Perce War ==
Although he disliked white encroachments on his ancestral lands, Looking Glass opposed going to war with the United States over its plans to force all the Nez Perce onto the reduced Indian reservation assigned to them at Lapwai, Idaho. His village of about 140 people was already within the bounds of the reservation on the site of the present-day Kooskia National Fish Hatchery in Idaho. However, General Oliver Otis Howard believed reports that Looking Glass planned to join the Nez Perce led by Chief Joseph, who resisted moving to the reservation, and sent a military force of 66 men under Captain Stephen Whipple to arrest Looking Glass. Whipple and his men arrived at the village on July 1. After a random shot was fired by an unknown party, the soldiers opened fire on the village with Gatling guns. Looking Glass and most of his band escaped, but the village and property was destroyed by the soldiers.

After the attack, Looking Glass and his followers joined Joseph's band, raising the total number of the group to about 800 men, women, and children. Looking Glass persuaded the others to flee eastwards across the Bitterroot Mountains, thus beginning a three-month, 1,400 miles (2,300 km) fighting retreat. Because of his experience, Looking Glass became perhaps the most important battle leader of the Nez Perce. His prestige, however, was diminished when he allowed the Nez Perce to be surprised by the U.S. army at the Battle of the Big Hole.

Looking Glass encouraged the Nez Perce to travel east and seek sanctuary with the Crow nation in Montana. He had helped the Crow defeat the Dakota Sioux in a battle in 1874 and considered them friends. However, the Crow, fearing retaliation by the U.S. military, refused to grant the Nez Perce sanctuary. The Nez Perce, pursued by the army, then turned north to attempt reaching safety in Canada. However, on September 29, 1877, they were surrounded 40 miles (64 km) short of Canada in the Bear Paw Mountains of Montana. After the five-day siege and the Battle of Bear Paw Chief Joseph proposed surrender. White Bird and Looking Glass opposed the surrender and they and their bands attempted to break through the siege and continue on to Canada and join the Lakota leader Sitting Bull. White Bird and 150 Nez Perce succeeded but Looking Glass was killed by a Cheyenne scout employed by the Army. Joseph's famous surrender speech later that same day, October 5, mentioned that Looking Glass was dead.

== Legacy ==
On July 1, 2000, 123 years after the attack on Looking Glass's village, the Nez Perce dedicated a nature trail on the site, and three years later put up a commemorative marker. A fishing area three miles north of Florence, Montana, was dedicated to him also, in 1971.

== Bibliography ==
- Lafarge, Oliver. (MCMLVI). Crown Publishers Inc. Page 192.
