= White Bird =

White Bird may refer to:

== Music and entertainment ==
- "White Bird" (song), a 1969 song by the San Francisco band It's a Beautiful Day from the album It's a Beautiful Day
- "White Bird", a 1969 song by the Incredible String Band on their album Changing Horses
- "White Bird" (Knight Rider) a 1983 television episode
- White Bird (film), a 2023 American film

== Other ==
- White Bird (Native American leader) (died 1892), Nez Perce leader
- White Bird, Idaho, a town in the United States
- White Bird: A Wonder Story, a 2019 graphic novel
- The White Bird, a French biplane which disappeared while attempting a transatlantic crossing in 1927
- White Bird Hill Summit, a mountain grade and mountain pass on U.S. Highway 95 in North Central Idaho

== See also ==
- Whitbread (disambiguation)
