= White Bird Hill Summit =

- Location within the United States Location within Idaho
- Elevation: 4,245 ft (1,294 m)
- Traversed by: US 95

Third Approach
- Location: Idaho County, Idaho, U.S.
- Range: Clearwater Mountains
- Coordinates: 45.844°N 116.237°W

White Bird Hill Summit is a mountain pass in the northwest United States, located in north central Idaho on U.S. Highway 95. In Idaho County, it is midway between White Bird and Grangeville. The summit elevation of the highway is 4,245 feet (1,294 m) above sea level, through a substantial cut.

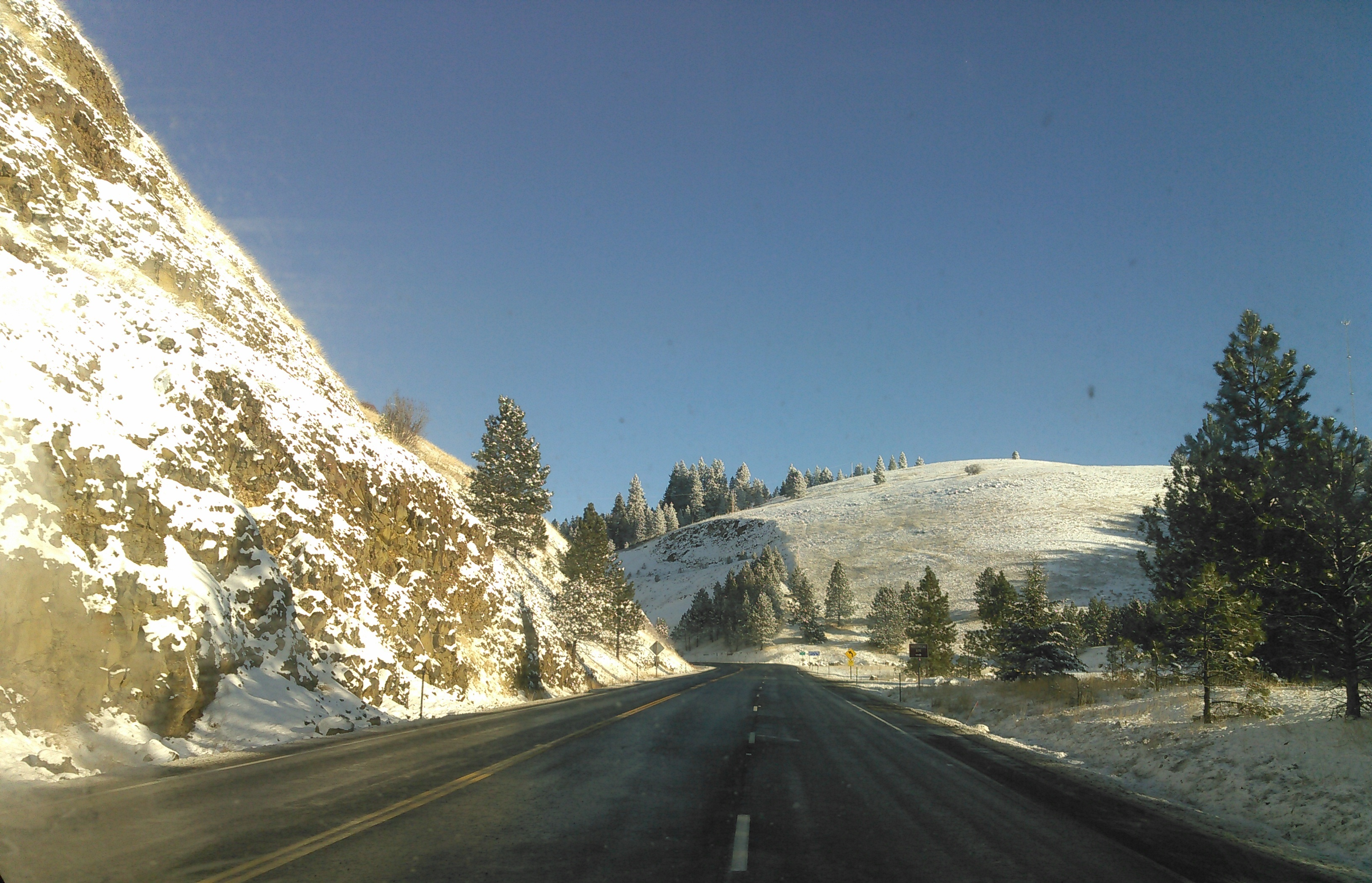
Nearing the summit of the climb from the south, about to enter the road cut at the top.

The modern multi-lane highway was completed 51 years ago, following ten years of construction which concluded with the opening of the 811-foot-long (247 m) steel bridge at the base over White Bird Creek in June 1975. The treeless northbound grade climbs 2,700 vertical feet (825 m) in seven miles (11 km), an average gradient of over seven percent.

The contract for the original road, 22 miles (35 km) from the mouth of White Bird Creek at the Salmon River to Grangeville, was awarded in late 1918. Completed in 1921 and first paved in 1938, it rose 184 feet (56 m) higher to 4,429 feet (1,350 m), due to the absence of a summit cut. Located to the east, the old road was twice the length and had a multitude of switchbacks ascending a treeless slope. On the present highway, the descent north of the summit is less dramatic as the grade drops less than 850 feet (260 m) in the forest with few curves onto the Camas Prairie towards Grangeville at 3,400 feet (1,035 m).

White Bird Hill Summit marks the divide between the Salmon River and the Camas Prairie. The Battle of White Bird Canyon of the Nez Perce War occurred in the valley south of the summit in 1877. The summit is named after Chief White Bird, a leader of the Nez Perce tribe.

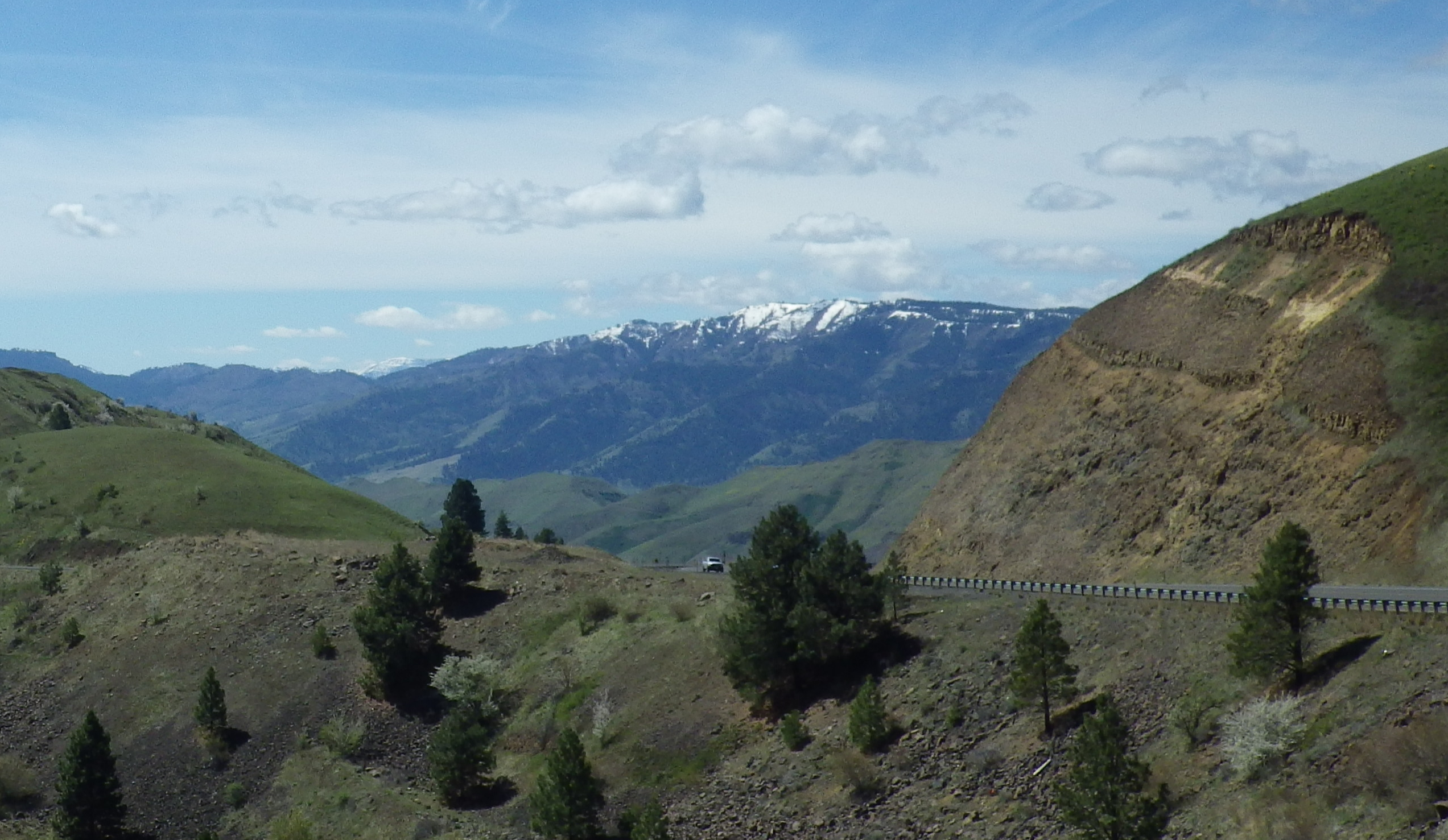
A car is seen driving through one of the rock cuts approaching White Bird Summit Hill in spring time.

As far back as the early 1950s, alternatives were proposed; one in 1952 bypassed the summit, Grangeville, and Fenn by continuing down the lower Salmon River another fifteen miles (25 km) to an elevation of around 1,350 feet (410 m) at the mouth of Rock Creek (45.905°N 116.397°W). It then climbed Rock Creek and Graves Creek up to Cottonwood at 3,520 feet (1,075 m).

== Video ==
- YouTube video - motorcycle POV - White Bird Hill - northbound US-95 - June 2011
- YouTube video - motorcycle trailer POV - White Bird Hill - southbound US-95 - June 2011
