= Michael M. McCarthy =

Canadian-American soldier

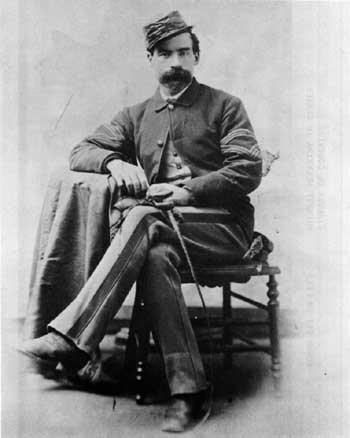
Michael McCarthy

Michael M. McCarthy (April 19, 1845 – January 12, 1914) was a British North America-born US Army soldier who received the Medal of Honor for his actions during the Indian Wars. He was born in St. John's, Newfoundland Colony, and moved with his family to Massachusetts in 1852.

McCarthy joined the Army in November 1865, a few months after the American Civil War. He later served in the Nez Perce War and during the Battle of White Bird Canyon, as first sergeant, Troop H, 1st Cavalry, he earned the Medal of Honor. He was discharged in May 1879 with the rank of quartermaster sergeant.

After settling in Walla Walla, Washington, McCarthy was elected first lieutenant of Company A, Walla Walla Artillery, Washington Territorial Militia on 18 May 1881 and to captain in the same company on 1 August 1881. On March 28, 1885, he was appointed assistant adjutant general with the rank of captain and was promoted to lieutenant colonel on March 5, 1887, continuing his assignment as assistant adjutant general. In a reorganization in 1888, he resigned to accept an appointment as captain of Company A, 2nd Regiment of the Washington National Guard, serving continuously until he was again appointed lieutenant colonel of the 2nd Regiment on 27 April 1891. On 22 December 1897 he was appointed colonel and quartermaster general of the Washington National Guard, in which position he served until he was reappointed in the same grade to serve as chief of engineers, National Guard Washington. He retired on 16 October 1905. As far as can be ascertained, Colonel McCarthy is the only Medal of Honor recipient to serve in the Washington National Guard.

McCarthy died from a cerebral hemorrhage in Walla Walla, and was buried in Mountain View Cemetery.

== Medal of Honor citation ==
Was detailed with 6 men to hold a commanding position, and held it with great gallantry until the troops fell back. He then fought his way through the Indians, rejoined a portion of his command, and continued the fight in retreat. He had 2 horses shot from under him, and was captured, but escaped and reported for duty after 3 days' hiding and wandering in the mountains.
