= White Bird Grade =

- U.S. National Register of Historic Places
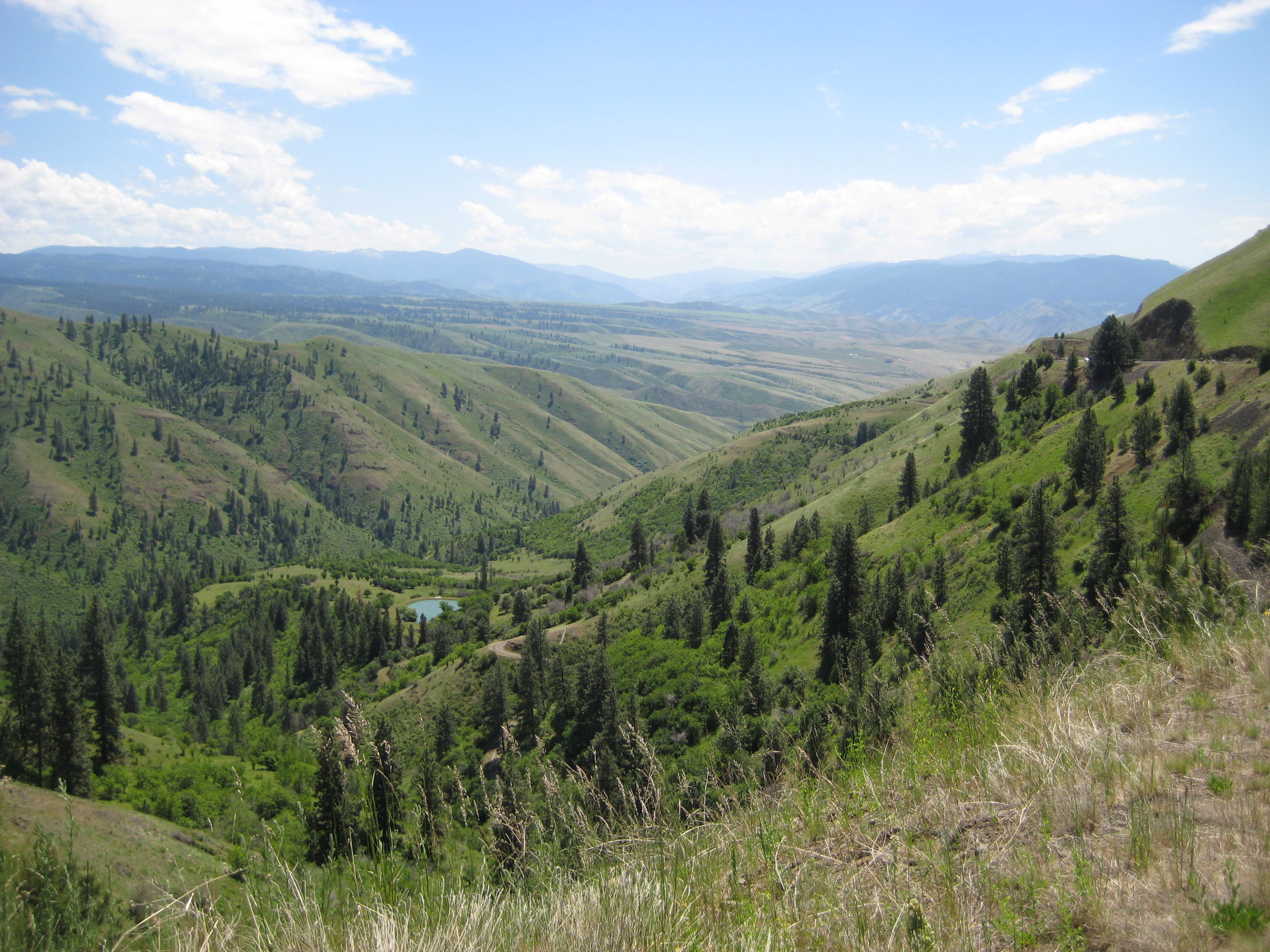
- White Bird Hill in north central Idaho

- Location within Idaho Location within the United States
- Location: Idaho County, Idaho, northeast of White Bird
- Coordinates: 45.816°N 116.253°W
- Area: 73 acres (30 ha)
- Built: 1920
- NRHP reference No.: 74000740
- Added to NRHP: July 30, 1974

The White Bird Grade is a historic mountain highway along a former section of U.S. Route 95 near White Bird, Idaho, United States. It is listed on the National Register of Historic Places as an engineering accomplishment, a "marvel" which was an achievement of the early good roads movement.

The highway in Idaho County was built 106 years ago in 1920 and upgraded through 1938. Its 1974 NRHP nomination asserts that it "will be remembered as one of the marvels of highway engineering, built when cars did not travel much more than 25 miles per hour (40 km/h)." At the time, a more modern highway was being built through the area. and it opened in June 1975.

The contract for the original road, 22 miles (35 km) from the mouth of White Bird Creek at the Salmon River to Grangeville, was awarded in late 1918. Completed in 1921 and first paved in 1938, it rose slightly higher to 4,429 feet (1,350 m), due to the absence of a summit cut. Located to the east, the old road was twice the length and had a multitude of switchbacks ascending a treeless slope.

Farmers kept water troughs at a few of the precarious switchbacks for their livestock. People who frequently traveled the road knew their exact locations, as they were a popular stop for overheated cars. Some log trucks would exit the new US95 in White Bird and take the old, narrow, switchback-riddled US 95, since the grade was spread out over about 4 extra miles making it easier on trucks hauling heavy loads over the grade. There is an annual charity "Just For the Hill of It" bike challenge up the old White Bird Grade.

== See also ==
- White Bird Hill Summit
