= Stephen Girard Whipple =

Stephen Girard Whipple (November 5, 1823 – October 21, 1895) was an American 49er, newspaper editor, politician, and a Union officer commanding an all-volunteer Battalion of Mountaineers and the Humboldt Military District in the Bald Hills War against the Indians in northwest California during the American Civil War. After the Civil War, he was an officer in the U. S. Army serving in the Apache Wars and in the Nez Perce War, at various frontier posts.

== Early life ==
Stephen Girard Whipple was born on November 15, 1823, in Williston, Vermont. He went to California during the 1849 Gold Rush and entered state politics. He served as a member of the California State Assembly for the 12th District in 1854–55 and 1857–58. He was involved in the California State Militia and was one of several influential men who wrote to the Governor of California to establish a volunteer company called the Citizens of Crescent City in 1856 to defend Crescent City against attack by Indians of Klamath County. He was also editor of the Northern Californian, one of two newspapers on the Humboldt Bay. While Whipple was away on business, Bret Harte, who worked for Whipple's paper, wrote against the killers of the Indian Island Massacre (in opposition to Whipple's views) and soon left the area due to the threats against his life.

== Civil War: the Bald Hills War ==
In the early part of the Civil War, Whipple wrote to the Department of the Pacific Commander advocating a more active prosecution of the war with the Indians in the Bald Hills War, with men used to the hardships of war in the mountainous redwood forests. His idea was adopted and he was appointed as Lieutenant Colonel commanding the 1st Battalion California Volunteer Mountaineers, a special light infantry Battalion. This unit was recruited primarily from Californians familiar with the area of the Humboldt Military District for the purpose of "capturing or killing" the Indians.

On July 13, 1863, Lt. Col. Whipple was appointed to command the Humboldt Military District, which he held until February, 1864, and began implementing his approach to the war. He was elected to serve again in the Assembly for the 27th District in 1863, and gave up his command from February 8, 1864, to June 1864, to attend the meeting of the State legislature, Colonel Henry M. Black taking his place. Whipple regained the command of the district again in June 1864, and held it until the district was absorbed by the Department of California on July 27, 1865. Aggressive patrolling and skirmishing by the Mountaineers and companies of other California volunteer regiments in the district during all times of the year eventually drove the tribes to make peace in August 1864.

== Career in the U.S. Army and later life ==
Following the Civil War Whipple chose to remain on active duty and received a commission as captain in the U. S. Army, most notably serving in Arizona under George Crook against the Apache. It was during his time in Arizona Territory that he made the acquaintance of Mrs. Georgia Ella (Harriman) Lord, recently widowed. Stephen later married Georgia at Saint Peter's Episcopal Church, Baltimore, Baltimore City, Maryland October 21, 1875. He adopted Georgia's daughter Sophie and they had two sons of their own: Elmer Judson Whipple, born 1876, and Stephen Cranston Whipple, born 1889.

Captain Whipple also took part in the Nez Perce War. On July 1, 1877, Whipple led the attack on Chief Looking Glass' camp but failed to capture Looking Glass as ordered. He then took part in the fights at Cottonwood Ranch from July 3–5, and fought in the Battle of the Clearwater.

He retired from the army in 1884 after twenty-one years of service. He was a Member of the Freemasons and of the Grand Army of the Republic.

== Death ==
Whipple died in Eureka, California, on October 21, 1895, and was buried in the G.A.R. section of the Myrtle Grove Cemetery in Eureka with a government military headstone installed to mark his grave. After his death, Georgia filed for a Civil War widow's pension October 12, 1897. She received application No. 663,941 and certificate No. 512,495. During a restoration of the Myrtle Grove Cemetery a work party located Whipple's marker under several inches of earth and grass, which they cleaned and reset.
