= Whitbread (disambiguation) =

Whitbread is a multinational hotel, coffee shop and restaurant company headquartered in Dunstable, United Kingdom.

Whitbread may also refer to:

== People with the surname ==
- Adrian Whitbread (born 1971), former professional footballer
- Barry Whitbread (born c. 1949), football coach
- Fatima Whitbread (born 1961), English former javelin thrower and multiple medal-winner
- Gary Whitbread (1957–2011), English cricketer
- James Whitbread Lee Glaisher (1848–1928), English mathematician
- Peter Whitbread (1928–2004), English actor and screenwriter
- Samuel Whitbread (1720–1796), English brewer and Member of Parliament
- Samuel Whitbread (1764–1815), English politician
- Samuel Whitbread (1830–1915), English brewer and Liberal politician
- Thomas Whitbread (1618–1679), English Jesuit missionary.
- Tony Whitbread, Chief Executive of Sussex Wildlife Trust
- Zak Whitbread (born 1984), American association football player

== See also ==
- Whitbread Round the World Race, former name of the Volvo Ocean Race sailing race
  - Whitbread 60, a class of racing designed for this race, known as the Volvo Ocean 60
- Whitbread Book Awards, former name of the Costa Book Awards
- Samuel Whitbread Academy, a school
- Whitbread Engine, one of the first rotative steam engines
