= Tolo Lake =

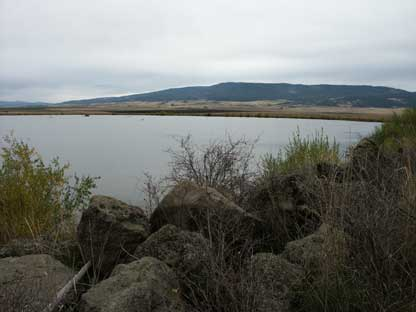
- Tolo Lake, unknown date

- Location within Idaho Location within the United States
- Location: Idaho County, Idaho; United States
- Coordinates: 45°54′55″N 116°14′10″W
- Basin countries: United States
- Surface area: 35 acres (14 ha)
- Surface elevation: 3,235 ft (986 m)

- Tolo Lake
- U.S. National Register of Historic Places
- Location: Tolo Lake Road, Nez Perce National Historical Park; Idaho County, Idaho; United States
- Nearest city: Grangeville
- Coordinates: 45°54′55″N 116°14′10″W
- Area: 206 acres (83 ha)
- NRHP reference No.: 10001200
- Added to NRHP: February 7, 2011

Tolo Lake is a shallow, natural lake in camas prairie in Idaho County, Idaho, United States. It is about 35 acres (14 ha) in size. An area of about 206 acres (83 ha) including the lake was listed on the National Register of Historic Places in 2011.

It is a historic rendez-vous site of the Nez Perce and others.

It also has historic significance from the Nez Perce War and the Battle of White Bird Canyon.

Mammoth bones were discovered there in 1995.

== See also ==
- National Register of Historic Places listings in Idaho County, Idaho
