= Tony Whitbread =

Dr Tony Whitbread is the former Chief Executive of Sussex Wildlife Trust and is also the national spokesman on woodland issues for The Wildlife Trusts.

Tony took a PhD in Grassland Ecology from Hatfield Polytechnic in 1981 and a BSc in Applied Biology. His career has encompassed working for the Nature Conservancy Council and the Royal Society for Nature Conservation (RSNC), in addition to the Wildlife Trust. He joined the Sussex Wildlife Trust as Head of Conservation in 1991 and became Chief Executive in April 2006.

Today he is a regular speaker at national conferences and on national radio.
