= Mount Idaho, Idaho =

Mount Idaho
- Ghost town
- Location within the United States Location within Idaho
- Coordinates: 45°54′14″N 116°04′56″W
- Country: United States
- State: Idaho
- County: Idaho
- Elevation: 3,640 ft (1,110 m)
- Time zone: UTC-8 (Pacific (PST))
  - Summer (DST): UTC-7 (PDT)

Mount Idaho is a ghost town the western United States, located in Idaho County, Idaho. The town served as county seat of Idaho County from 1875 to 1902.

== History ==
A 45-mile (72 km) stretch of trail opened in 1860 in the Mount Idaho area is believed to be one of the earliest examples of a toll road on record in the region. According to local legend, the owner of this road, Mose Milner, was forced to sell the area to Loyal P. Brown after being permanently disabled in a fight with a mountain lion. Brown is considered the founder of Mount Idaho.

The town of Mount Idaho was founded around 1862 as an outpost serving nearby gold mining areas. By 1873 Mount Idaho was connected by stagecoach with Lewiston.

During the Nez Perce War of 1877, a hotel in Mount Idaho served as a hospital. Some of the dead from that conflict were buried in the town's cemetery. The Battle of White Bird Canyon was fought nearby on June 17.

By 1892, Mount Idaho was in competition with nearby Grangeville, some 3.5 miles (5.6 km) northwest, as the main town in Idaho County. The county seat was moved from Mount Idaho to Grangeville ten years later. By 1922, when the town's post office closed, Mount Idaho had been effectively assimilated by Grangeville.

Historical population
Census	Pop.	Note	%±
1870	125		—
1880	159		27.2%
1890	190		19.5%
1900	539		183.7%
1910	100		−81.4%
1920	105		5.0%
1930	70		−33.3%
1950	50		—
1960	90		80.0%
1980	75		—
1990	70		−6.7%
