= Fred Small (singer-songwriter) =

American singer-songwriter (born 1952)

- Born: Frederick Emerson Small; November 6, 1952 (age 73); United States
- Genres: American folk music, Protest music
- Occupations: Musician, songwriter, lawyer, Unitarian minister
- Instrument: guitar
- Years active: 1981–present
- Labels: Aquifer, Rounder Records, Flying Fish Records

Frederick Emerson Small (born November 6, 1952), known publicly as Fred Small, is an American singer-songwriter. He began his career as a lawyer and later became a Unitarian Universalist minister.

Small graduated from Yale University and the University of Michigan, from which he earned both a J.D. degree and a master's in environmental policy. His first position was as staff attorney for the Conservation Law Foundation.

His songs often make a political or ethical statement. Among his best-known songs are "Heart of the Appaloosa", "Everything Possible", "Peace Is", and "Cranes Over Hiroshima".

His debut album, Love's Gonna Carry Us (1981), featured Small singing and accompanying himself on guitar. As his fame and success increased, so too did the production level of his albums, as he included more instrumentation, and appearances by other artists, including instrumental and vocal backing by popular New England folk artists. Famous fiddlers, guitarists, and mandolin players alike became a part of Small's discography and helped Small increase his popularity.

After graduating from Harvard Divinity School, he became the minister of First Church Unitarian in Littleton, Massachusetts in 1996. On April 20, 2008, he was called as Senior Minister at First Parish in Cambridge, Massachusetts. Small resigned in September 2015 to devote his energies to climate advocacy. He is currently Minister for Climate Justice at the Arlington Street Church, Boston, and Director of Faith Outreach for Climate XChange, which advocates for carbon pricing legislation in Massachusetts.

His 1983 song "Everything Possible" was adapted into a picture book, illustrated by Alison Brown and published in 2023.

== Discography ==
- Love's Gonna Carry Us (Aquifer, 1981)
- The Heart of the Appaloosa (Rounder Records, 1983)
- No Limit (Rounder, 1985)
- I Will Stand Fast (Flying Fish Records, 1988)
- Jaguar (Flying Fish, 1991)
- Everything Possible (Flying Fish, 1993)
- Only Love (Aquifer, 2001)
