= White Bird, Idaho =

- City
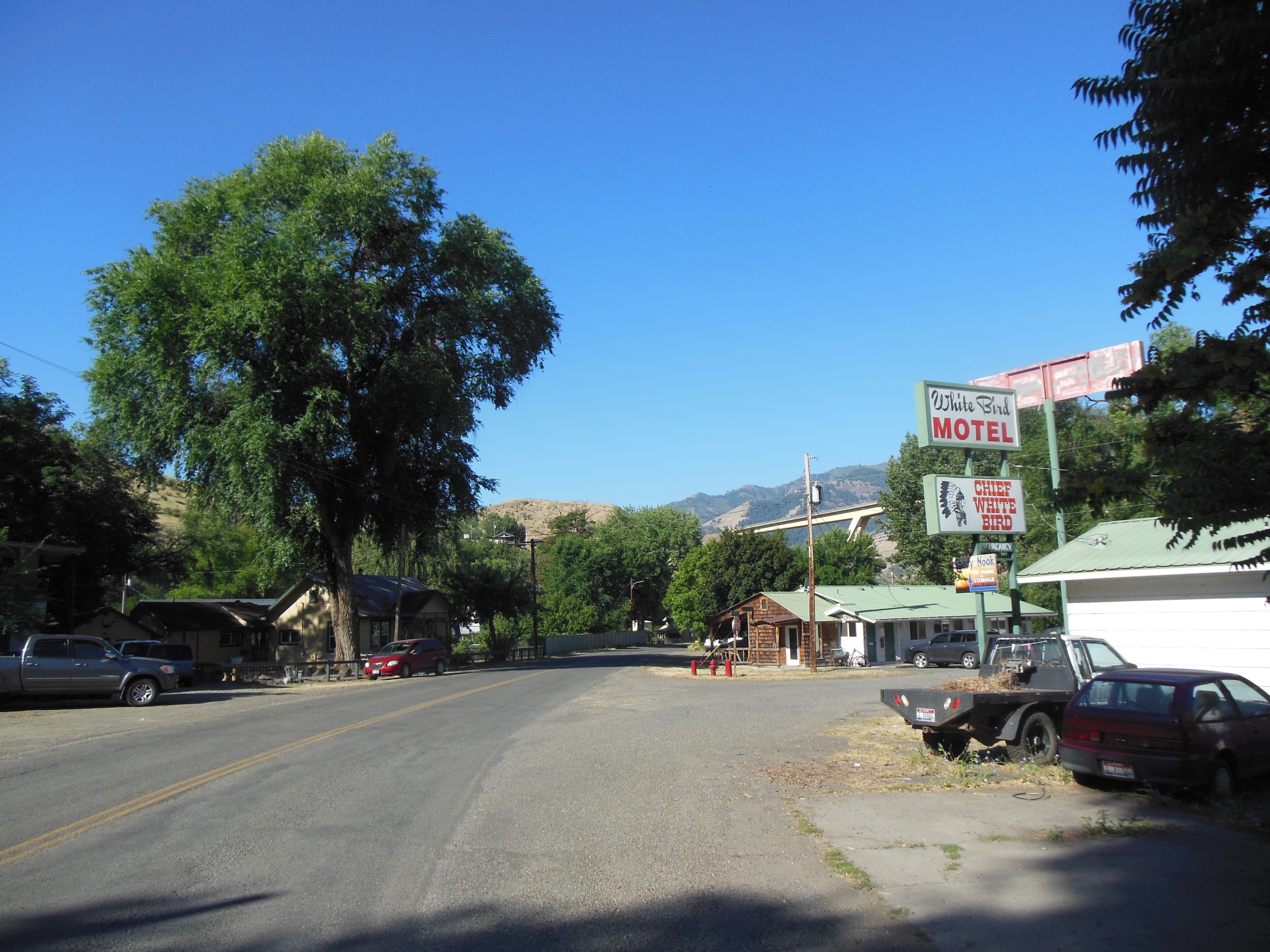
- Old Highway 95 in White Bird, July 2016
- Motto: "The Best of Two Rivers"
- Location of White Bird in Idaho County, Idaho.
- Coordinates: 45°45′46″N 116°18′01″W
- Country: United States
- State: Idaho
- County: Idaho

Area
  - Total: 0.066 sq mi (0.17 km^{2})
  - Land: 0.066 sq mi (0.17 km^{2})
  - Water: 0 sq mi (0.00 km^{2})
- Elevation: 1,581 ft (482 m)

Population (2020)
  - Total: 83
  - Density: 1,300/sq mi (490/km^{2})
- Time zone: UTC-8 (Pacific (PST))
  - Summer (DST): UTC-7 (PDT)
- ZIP code: 83554
- Area code: 208
- FIPS code: 16-87310
- GNIS feature ID: 2412252
- Website: www.visitwhitebird.com

White Bird is a city in Idaho County, Idaho. The population was 83 at the time of the 2020 census, down from 91 in 2010.

== History ==
At the southwest corner of the Camas Prairie, White Bird is near the Salmon River crossing point for the Lewis and Clark expedition. It is also the location of the Battle of White Bird Canyon in 1877, which was the first fight of the Nez Perce War and a significant defeat of the U.S. Army.

The summit of White Bird Hill is 2,700 feet (820 m) above the city, ascended via U.S. Highway 95. The steeper, straighter and faster multi-lane grade of U.S. 95 was opened 51 years ago in 1975, after ten challenging years of construction. The two-lane road of 1921 to the east was first paved in 1938; it left the Salmon River at White Bird Creek, followed it up through White Bird and then gradually climbed the grade in twice the distance, with multiple switchback curves to a higher summit, without a cut.

White Bird was established 135 years ago in 1891 and was named for Chief White Bird, a Nez Perce leader.

== Geography ==
According to the United States Census Bureau, the city has a total area of 0.07 square miles (0.18 km^{2}), all of it land.

== Demographics ==
Historical population
| Census | Pop. | Note | %± |
|---|---|---|---|
| 1960 | 253 | | — |
| 1970 | 185 | | −26.9% |
| 1980 | 154 | | −16.8% |
| 1990 | 108 | | −29.9% |
| 2000 | 106 | | −1.9% |
| 2010 | 91 | | −14.2% |
| 2020 | 83 | | −8.8% |
U.S. Decennial Census

=== 2010 census ===
At the 2010 census, there were 91 people in 53 households, including 27 families, in the city. The population density was 1,300.0 inhabitants per square mile (501.9/km^{2}). There were 64 housing units at an average density of 914.3 per square mile (353.0/km^{2}). The racial makeup of the city was 100.0% White. Hispanic or Latino of any race were 1.1%.

Of the 53 households, 7.5% had children under the age of 18 living with them, 45.3% were married couples living together, 3.8% had a female householder with no husband present, 1.9% had a male householder with no wife present and 49.1% were non-families. 41.5% of households were one person and 13.2% were one person aged 65 or older. The average household size was 1.72 and the average family size was 2.26.

The median age was 60.5 years. 5.5% of residents were under the age of 18, 3.3% were between the ages of 18 and 24, 5.5% were from 25 to 44, 52.8% were from 45 to 64 and 33% were 65 or older. The gender makeup of the city was 51.6% male and 48.4% female.

=== 2000 census ===
At the 2000 census there were 106 people in 59 households, including 31 families, in the city. The population density was 1,623.7 inhabitants per square mile (626.9/km^{2}). There were 73 housing units at an average density of 1,118.2 per square mile (431.7/km^{2}). The racial makup of the city was 97.17% White, 0.94% Native American and 1.89% from two or more races. Hispanic or Latino of any race were 1.89%.

Of the 59 households, 6.8% had children under the age of 18 living with them, 47.5% were married couples living together, 3.4% had a female householder with no husband present and 45.8% were non-families. 39.0% of households were one person and 11.9% were one person aged 65 or older. The average household size was 1.80 and the average family size was 2.31.

The age distribution was 12.3% under the age of 18, 3.8% from 18 to 24, 11.3% from 25 to 44, 46.2% from 45 to 64 and 26.4% 65 or older. The median age was 53 years. For every 100 females, there were 116.3 males. For every 100 females age 18 and over, there were 116.3 males.

The median household income was $18,558 and the median family income was $21,042. Males had a median income of $21,667 versus $25,000 for females. The per capita income for the city was $10,819. There were 10.8% of families and 21.2% of the population living below the poverty line, including 40.0% of under eighteens and none of those over 64.

== Notable person ==
- Priscilla Giddings, member of the Idaho House of Representatives

== See also ==
- List of cities in Idaho
