= White Bird (Native American leader) =

Native American leader

- Peo-peo-hix-hiix
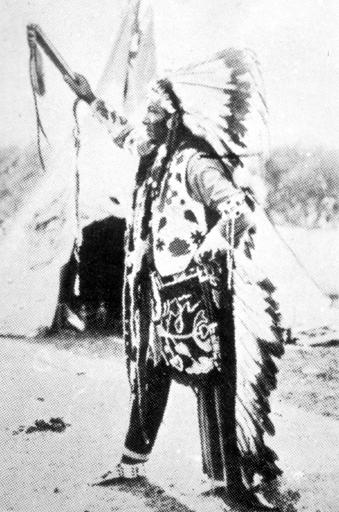

Nez Perce tribe, Lamátta band leader

Personal details
- Died: March 6, 1892 Pincher Creek
- Cause of death: Murder

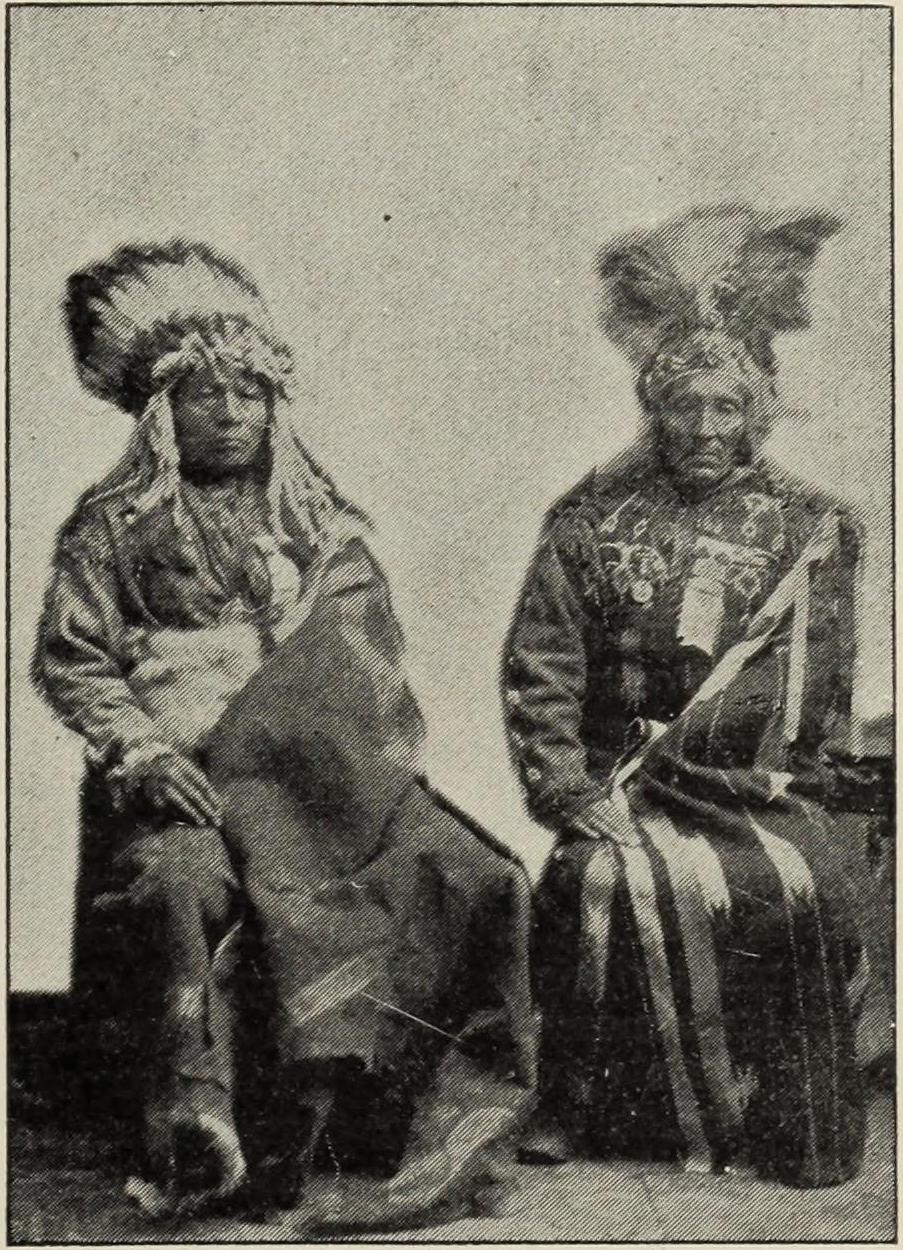
White Bird, Sioux Chief and Joseph, Chief of the Flatheads, published 1889

White Bird (Peo-peo-hix-hiix, piyóopiyo x̣ayx̣áyx̣ or more correctly Peopeo Kiskiok Hihih - "White Goose"), also referred to as White Pelican (died 1892), was leader, war chief and tooat (Shaman or Prophet) of the Lamátta or Lamtáama band of the Nez Perce tribe with the Lamata village along the Salmon River. His band and the village took its name from Lahmatta ("area with little snow"), by which White Bird Canyon was known to the Nez Perce.

== History ==
Chief White Bird, like many of his people, was a Dreamer, a follower of the teachings of Smohalla, the Wanapam shaman and prophet. Alongside Chief Joseph, White Bird directed the 1877 withdrawal from eastern Oregon into Montana and ahead toward the Canada–US border during the Nez Perce War. White Bird's following was second in size to Joseph's but did not exceed 600 men. White Bird and Joseph led the Nez Percé Indians until October 1877, when General Nelson Miles of the U.S. Army attacked them at Snake Creek at the Battle of Bear Paw, south of Havre, Montana. Following a five-day fight, Joseph and many of the fatigued band acknowledged a cessation of hostilities, surrendered to Miles, and became prisoners of war.

White Bird refused to relinquish and left on the night of October 5. He effectively slipped through enemy lines with over a hundred of the band.

== Canada ==
In October 1877, about ninety adults and a great number of children led by White Bird arrived with some three hundred head of horses at Sitting Bull's camp in Saskatchewan. White Bird and his family settled in Pincher Creek, Alberta, area to live out their lives. The war chief never returned to the United States, choosing to stay in Canada at Pincher Creek. White Bird was murdered on March 6, 1892, by a fellow Nez Percé named Charley Hasenahamahkikt. The 22-year-old killer was captured and sent to the Stony Mountain Institution in Manitoba, Canada to serve a life sentence.

== Other facts ==
The town of White Bird, Idaho, and the adjacent White Bird Hill in Idaho County are named for the chief. The Battle of White Bird Canyon took place in this area in June 1877.

== See also ==
- Sitting Bull
- Chief Joseph
- Nez Percé
- White Bird, Idaho
