= Nez Perce War =

1877 armed conflict between the U.S. Army and Native Americans in the Pacific Northwest

- Part of the American Indian Wars
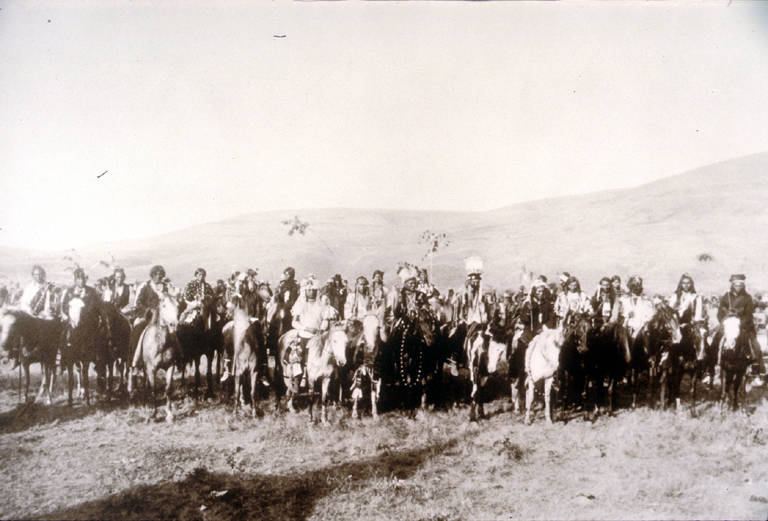
- Chiefs Joseph, Looking Glass, and White Bird in the spring of 1877
| Date | June 14 – October 5, 1877 |
| Location | Oregon, Idaho, Wyoming, and Montana |
| Result | United States victory |

Belligerents
| United States | Nez Percé; Palouse |

Commanders and leaders
| (United States) Luther Hare (United States) Oliver Otis Howard (United States) John Gibbon (United States) Nelson A. Miles (United States) Samuel D. Sturgis | Chief Joseph; Looking Glass †; White Bird; Ollokot †; Toohoolhoolzote †; Poker Joe † (Lean Elk); Red Echo (Hahtalekin); Bald head (Husishusis Kute) |

Strength
| 1,500 soldiers, civilian volunteers, Indian scouts | 250 warriors, +500 non-combatant women and children—numbers are approximate |

Casualties and losses
| 125 killed, 146 wounded | 103–133 combatants and noncombatants killed, 71–91 combatants and noncombatants wounded (possibly more); 418 surrendered, 150–200 escaped to Canada |

The Nez Perce War was an armed conflict in 1877 in the Western United States that pitted several bands of the Nez Perce tribe of Native Americans and their allies, a small band of the Palouse tribe led by Red Echo (Hahtalekin) and Bald Head (Husishusis Kute), against the United States Army. Fought between June and October, the conflict stemmed from the refusal of several bands of the Nez Perce, dubbed "non-treaty Indians," to give up their ancestral lands in the Pacific Northwest and move to an Indian reservation in Idaho Territory. This forced removal was in violation of the 1855 Treaty of Walla Walla, which granted the tribe 7.5 million acres of their ancestral lands and the right to hunt and fish on lands ceded to the U.S. government.

After the first armed engagements in June, the Nez Perce embarked on an arduous trek north initially to seek help with the Crow tribe. After the Crows' refusal of aid, they sought sanctuary with the Lakota led by Sitting Bull, who had fled to Canada in May 1877 to avoid capture following the 1876 Battle of the Little Bighorn.

The Nez Perce were pursued by elements of the U.S. Army with whom they fought a series of battles and skirmishes on a fighting retreat of 1,170 miles (1,880 km). The war ended after a final five-day battle fought alongside Snake Creek at the base of Montana's Bears Paw Mountains only 40 miles (64 km) from the Canada–US border. A large majority of the surviving Nez Perce represented by Chief Joseph of the Wallowa band of Nez Perce, surrendered to Brigadier Generals Oliver Otis Howard and Nelson A. Miles. White Bird, of the Lamátta band of Nez Perce, managed to elude the Army after the battle and escape with an undetermined number of his band to Sitting Bull's camp in Canada. The 418 Nez Perce who surrendered, including women and children, were taken prisoner and sent by train to Fort Leavenworth, Kansas.

Although Chief Joseph is the most well known of the Nez Perce leaders, he was not the sole overall leader. The Nez Perce were led by a coalition of several leaders from the different bands who comprised the "non-treaty" Nez Perce, including the Wallowa Ollokot, White Bird of the Lamátta band, Toohoolhoolzote of the Pikunin band, and Looking Glass of the Alpowai band. Brigadier General Howard was head of the U.S. Army's Department of the Columbia, which was tasked with forcing the Nez Perce onto the reservation and whose jurisdiction was extended by General William Tecumseh Sherman to allow Howard's pursuit. It was at the final surrender of the Nez Perce when Chief Joseph gave his famous "I Will Fight No More Forever" speech, which was translated by the interpreter Arthur Chapman.

An 1877 New York Times editorial discussing the conflict stated, "On our part, the war was in its origin and motive nothing short of a gigantic blunder and a crime". Many sites associated with the war are today preserved as part of Nez Perce National Historical Park.

== Background ==
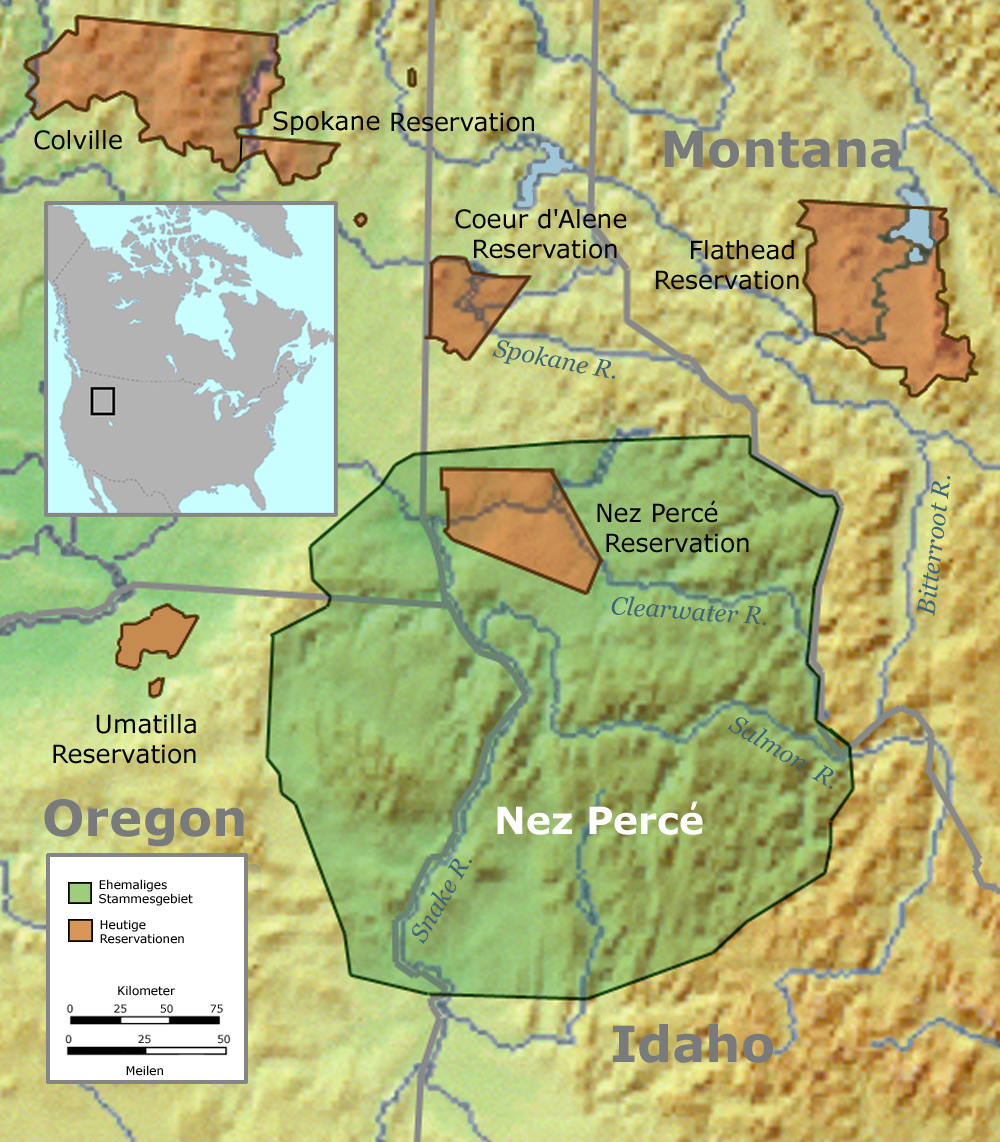
The Nez Perce reservation in 1855 (green) and the reduced reservation of 1863 (brown).

We took away their country and their means of support, broke up their mode of living, their habits of life, introduced disease and decay among them and it was for this and against this they made war. Could anyone expect less?

— Gen. Philip H. Sheridan

In 1855, at the Walla Walla Council, the Nez Perce were coerced by the federal government into giving up their ancestral lands and moving to the Umatilla Reservation in Oregon Territory with the Walla Walla, Cayuse, and Umatilla tribes. The tribes involved were so bitterly opposed to the terms of the plan that Isaac I. Stevens, governor and superintendent of Indian affairs for the Washington Territory, and Joel Palmer, superintendent of Indian affairs for Oregon Territory, signed the Nez Perce Treaty in 1855, which granted the Nez Perce the right to remain in a large portion of their own lands in Idaho, Washington, and Oregon territories, in exchange for relinquishing almost 5.5 million acres of their approximately 13 million acre homeland to the U.S. government for a nominal sum, with the caveat that they be able to hunt, fish. and pasture their horses etc. on unoccupied areas of their former land – the same rights to use public lands as Anglo-American citizens of the territories.

The newly established Nez Perce Indian reservation was 7,500,000 acres (30,000 km^{2}) in Idaho, Oregon, and Washington territories. Under the terms of the treaty, no white settlers were allowed on the reservation without the permission of the Nez Perce. However, in 1860 gold was discovered near present-day Pierce, Idaho, and 5,000 gold-seekers rushed onto the reservation, illegally founding the downstream city of Lewiston as a supply depot on Nez Perce land. There was in fact very little gold to be had in Nez Perce territory, but ranchers and farmers followed to stabilize the large illegal settlements, and whites eager to seize and occupy fertile land soon began to roam over the entire reservation. The Nez Perce were incensed at the failure of the U.S. government to uphold the treaties, and at settlers who squatted on their land and plowed up their camas prairies, which they depended on for subsistence.

In 1863, a group of Nez Perce were coerced into signing away 90% of their reservation to the U.S., leaving only 750,000 acres (3,000 km^{2}) in Idaho Territory. Under the terms of the treaty, all Nez Perce were to move onto the new and much smaller reservation east of Lewiston. A large number of Nez Perce, however, did not accept the validity of the treaty, refused to move to the reservation, and remained on their traditional lands. The Nez Perce who approved the treaty were mostly Christian; the opponents mostly followed the traditional religion. The "non-treaty" Nez Perce included the band of Chief Joseph, who lived in the Wallowa valley in northeastern Oregon. Disputes there with white farmers and ranchers led to the murders of several Nez Perce, and the murderers were never prosecuted.

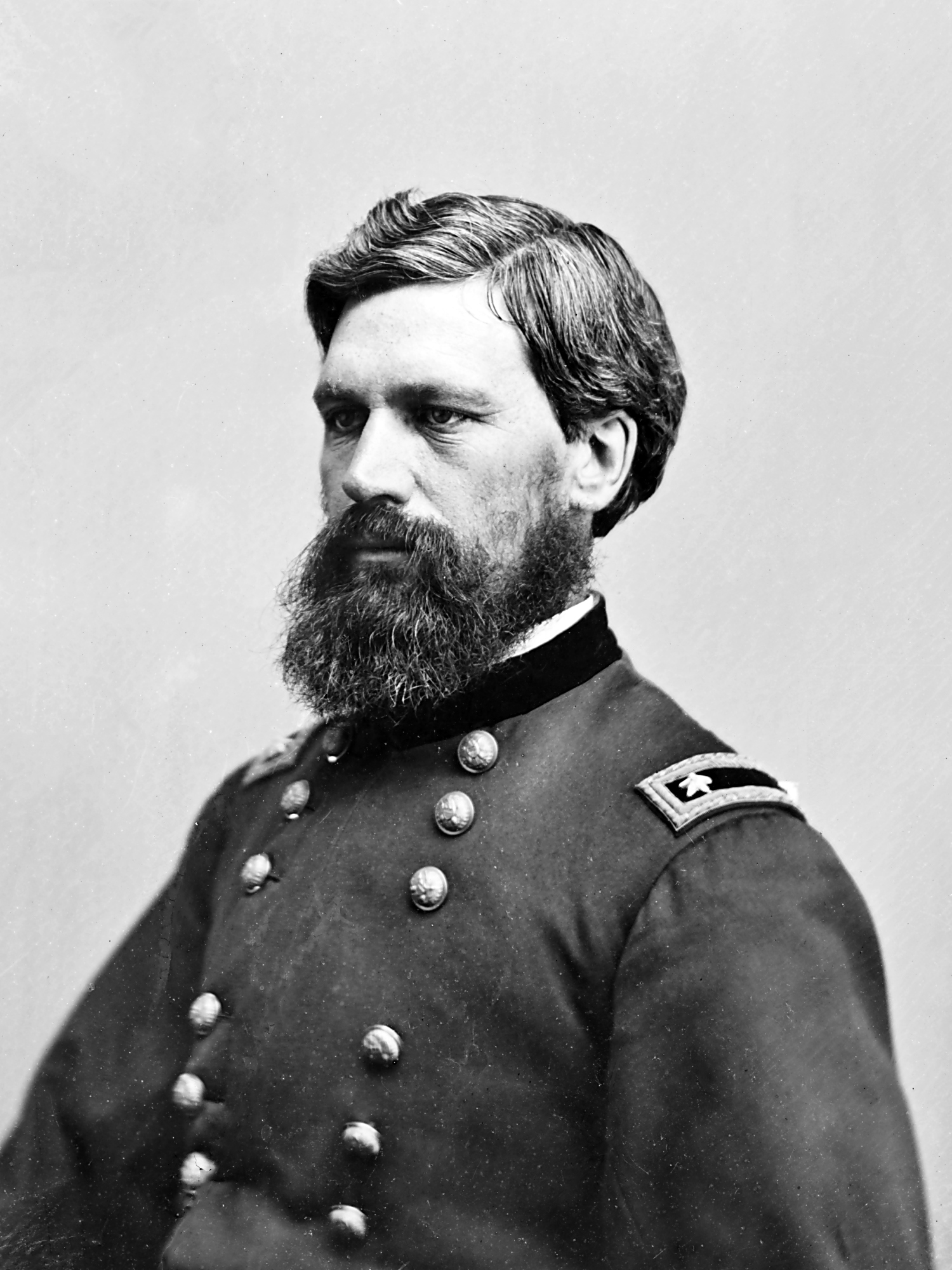
Gen. Oliver Otis Howard in a Civil War-era photograph.

Tensions between Nez Perce and white settlers rose in 1876 and 1877. General Oliver Otis Howard called a council in May 1877 and ordered the non-treaty bands to move to the reservation, setting an impossible deadline of 30 days. Howard humiliated the Nez Perce by jailing their old leader, Toohoolhoolzote, who spoke against moving to the reservation. The other Nez Perce leaders, including Chief Joseph, considered military resistance to be futile; they agreed to the move and reported as ordered to Fort Lapwai, Idaho Territory. By June 14, 1877, about 600 Nez Perce from Joseph's and White Bird's bands had gathered on the Camas Prairie, six miles (10 km) west of present-day Grangeville.

On June 13, shortly before the deadline for removing onto the reservation, White Bird's band held a tel-lik-leen ceremony at the Tolo Lake camp in which the warriors paraded on horseback in a circular movement around the village while individually boasting of their battle prowess and war deeds. According to Nez Perce accounts, an aged warrior named Hahkauts Ilpilp (Red Grizzly Bear) challenged the presence in the ceremony of several young participants whose relatives' deaths at the hands of whites had gone unavenged. One named Wahlitits (Shore Crossing) was the son of Eagle Robe, who had been shot to death by Lawrence Ott three years earlier. Thus humiliated and apparently fortified with liquor, Shore Crossing and two of his cousins, Sarpsisilpilp (Red Moccasin Top) and Wetyemtmas Wahyakt (Swan Necklace), set out for the Salmon River settlements on a mission of revenge. On the following evening, June 14, 1877, Swan Necklace returned to the lake to announce that the trio had killed four white men and wounded another man. Inspired by the war furor, approximately sixteen more young men rode off to join Shore Crossing in raiding the settlements.

Joseph and his brother Ollokot were away from the camp during the raids on June 14 and 15. When they arrived at the camp the next day, most of the Nez Perce had departed for a campsite on White Bird Creek to await the response of General Howard. Joseph considered an appeal for peace to the Whites, but realized it would be useless after the raids. Meanwhile, Howard mobilized his military force and sent out 130 men, including 13 friendly Nez Perce scouts, under the command of Captain David Perry to punish the Nez Perce and force them onto the reservation. Howard anticipated that his soldiers "will make short work of it."

== War ==
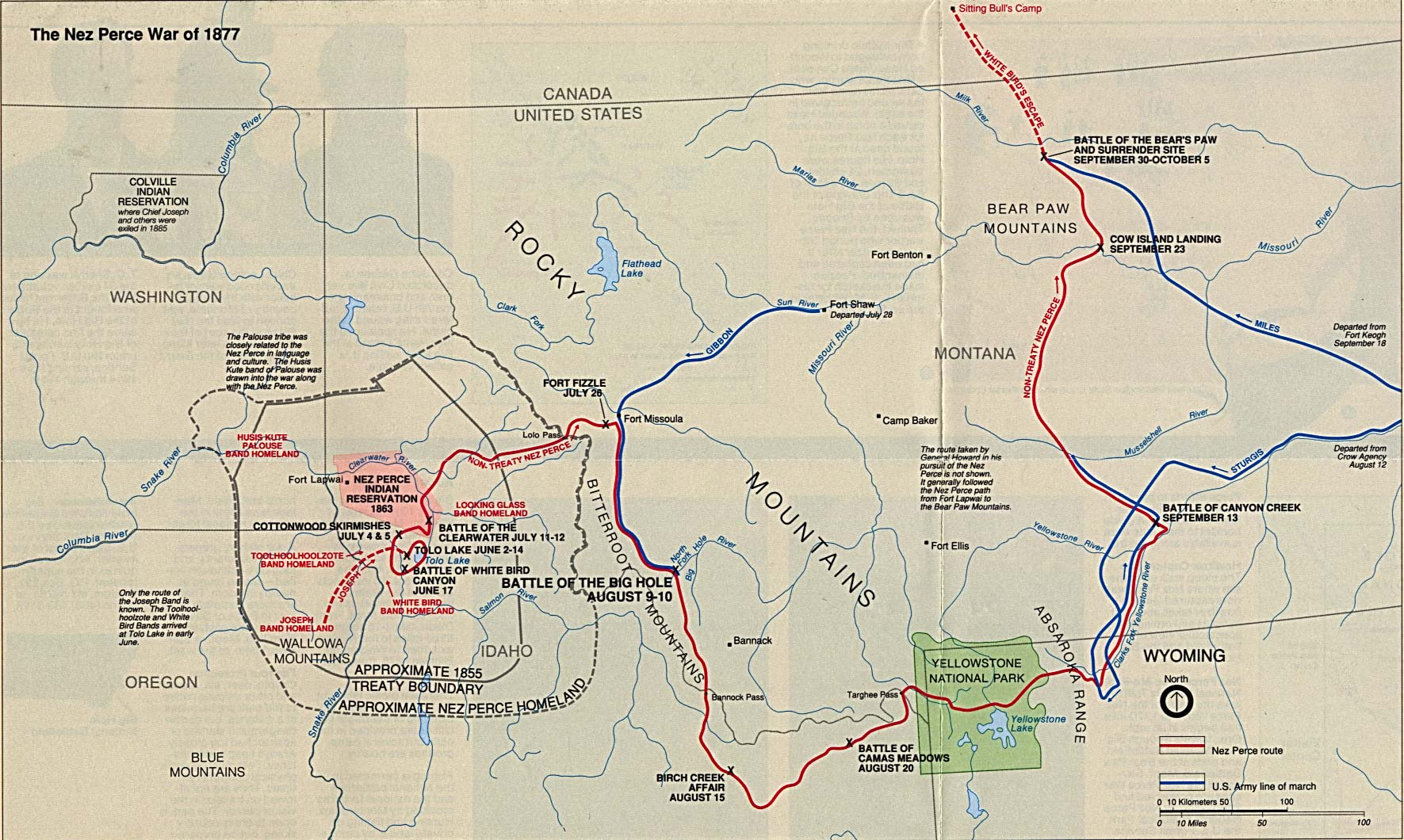
Map showing the flight of the Nez Perce and key battle sites

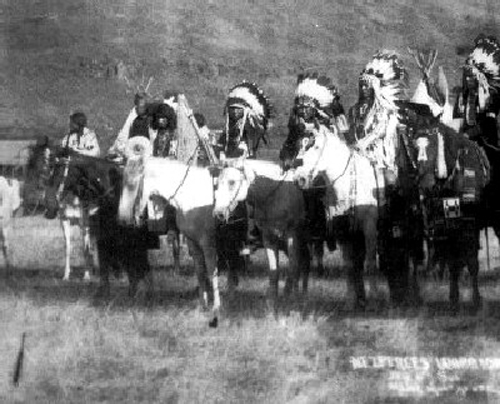
Nez Perce warriors

=== White Bird Canyon ===
By June 16, the bands had moved to the southern end of White Bird Canyon, about five miles (8 km) long, one mile (1.6 km) wide at its maximum, and bounded by steep mountain ridges. That night, sentinels reported the approach of U.S. soldiers from the north. After much deliberation, the Nez Perce decided that they would stay at White Bird and make an effort to avoid war, but fight if they were forced to do so. The soldiers included Company F and Company H of the 1st Cavalry Regiment, commanded by Captain David Perry and Captain Joel Graham Trimble, respectively. The officers and men of the two companies totaled 106.

Awaiting the soldiers, 50 warriors under Ollokot deployed to a butte on the western side of the canyon and 15 warriors under Two Moons on a butte to the east, thus placing themselves on both sides of the cavalry's route down the canyon. Six Nez Perce warriors waited with a white flag to discuss a truce with the approaching soldiers. An advance party, consisting of Lieutenant Edward Theller, Trumpeter John Jones, a few Nez Perce scouts employed by the Lapwai Agency, seven soldiers from Company F and civilian volunteer Arthur "Ad" Chapman made first contact with the truce party. For reasons never fully explained, Chapman fired at the truce party. The truce party took cover and the Nez Perce returned fire.

Captain Perry, riding back and forth between the two companies, saw the volunteers retreating up the canyon. Perry's left flank and Trimble's right flank were compromised. Seeing further collapse of his flank, Perry tried to rally his men to advance to McCarthy's position and make a stand on the high ground about 300 yards (270 m) to the south. But Company F, confused and having suffering numerous casualties, misinterpreted Perry's order as a general retreat. Company H, seeing the urgent retreat of Company F, joined the flight and left McCarthy and his men stranded. Sensing victory, Ollokot's mounted warriors chased the retreating soldiers.

Lieutenant Parnell and Lieutenant Theller led squads in an attempt to retrace their approach towards the White Bird camp. Under fire, Theller became trapped in a steep rocky ravine and ran out of ammunition, and he and his seven men were killed by the Nez Perce. Captain Perry and Captain Trimble fled to the northwest up steep ridges. They reached the Camas Prairie on top of the ridge line and were able to regroup at Johnson's Ranch. Within minutes, Nez Perce warriors pressed the attack and the survivors continued their retreat for several miles toward Mount Idaho, where they were rescued by fresh volunteers.

By midmorning, 34 U.S. Cavalry soldiers had been killed and two had been wounded, while two volunteers had also been wounded in the opening of the battle. In contrast, only three Nez Perce warriors had been wounded. Some 63 carbines, many pistols, and hundreds of rounds of ammunition were picked up off the battlefield by Nez Perce warriors. These weapons greatly enhanced the Nez Perce arsenal for the remaining months of the war.

=== Looking Glass camp ===
In response to the defeat at White Bird Canyon, General Howard mobilized his forces. Though Chief Looking Glass had not previously been hostile to the army, a company was sent to arrest Looking Glass and his followers. The camp was destroyed, but Looking Glass escaped and subsequently joined Joseph and White Bird.

=== Cottonwood ===
After crossing and recrossing the Salmon River, the warriors rebuffed the army in a series of skirmishes near Cottonwood, Idaho, July 3–5, 1877.

=== Clearwater ===
Howard's main force caught up to the Nez Perce at their camp in the valley of the Clearwater River and attacked; the Nez Perce were able to escape toward Montana Territory.

Approximately 250 Nez Perce warriors, and 500 women and children, along with more than 2000 head of horses and other livestock, began a remarkable fighting retreat. They crossed from Idaho over Lolo Pass into Montana Territory. Forces attempted to halt the Nez Perce at Fort Fizzle, but the Nez Perce simply bypassed the barricade.

=== Big Hole ===
A small number of Nez Perce fighters, probably fewer than 200, defeated or held off larger forces of the U.S. Army in several battles. The most notable was the two-day Battle of the Big Hole in southwestern Montana territory, a battle with heavy casualties on both sides, including many women and children on the Nez Perce side. Until the Big Hole the Nez Perce had the naive view that they could end the war with the U.S. on terms favorable, or at least acceptable, to themselves. Afterwards, the war "increased in ferocity and tempo. From then on all white men were bound to be their enemies and yet their own fighting power had been severely reduced." They attempted to seek refuge with the Crow Nation, but, rejected by the Crow, ultimately decided to try to reach safety in Canada.

=== Camas Creek ===
With Howard's men camped at Camas Meadows, the Nez Perce conducted a nighttime raid in the early hours of August 20 and stole horses and mules. Howard's cavalry pursued the raiders, who were able to hold off the soldiers and continue their retreat into Yellowstone National Park.

=== Yellowstone ===
The Nez Perce fled through Yellowstone, travelling along what was later named Nez Perce Creek across the Central Plateau and Hayden Valley, crossing the Yellowstone River at Nez Perce Ford and exiting via a difficult route across the Absaroka Mountains.

=== Canyon Creek ===
The army next caught up with the Nez Perce on September 13 in the canyon of Canyon Creek, west of Billings. The warriors took up positions in the hills overlooking the approach to the canyon and fought a delaying action before escaping over the hills.

=== Bear Paw ===
The war came to an end when the Nez Perce stopped to make camp and rest on the prairie adjacent to Snake Creek in the foothills of the north slope of the Bear's Paw Mountains in Montana Territory, only 40 miles (64 km) from the Canada–United States border.

They believed that they had shaken off Howard and their pursuers, but they were unaware that the recently promoted Brigadier General Nelson A. Miles in command of the newly created District of the Yellowstone had been dispatched from the Tongue River Cantonment to find and intercept them. Miles led a combined force made up of units of the Fifth Infantry, and Second Cavalry and the Seventh Cavalry. Accompanying the troops were Lakota and Cheyenne Indian Scouts, many of whom had fought against the Army only a year prior during the Sioux War.

They made a surprise attack upon the Nez Perce camp on the morning of September 30. After a three-day standoff, Howard arrived with his command, on October 3 and the stalemate was broken. Chief Joseph surrendered on October 5, 1877, and declared in his famous surrender speech that he would "fight no more forever."

== Surrender ==
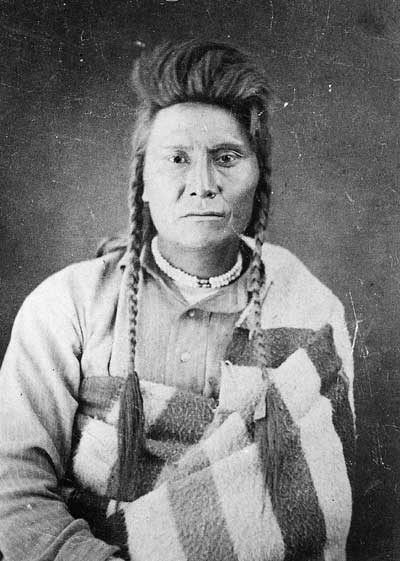
Chief Joseph, at Tongue River Cantonment in Montana Territory, taken by John H. Fouch on October 23, the same day the Nez Perce prisoners arrived, three weeks following the surrender.

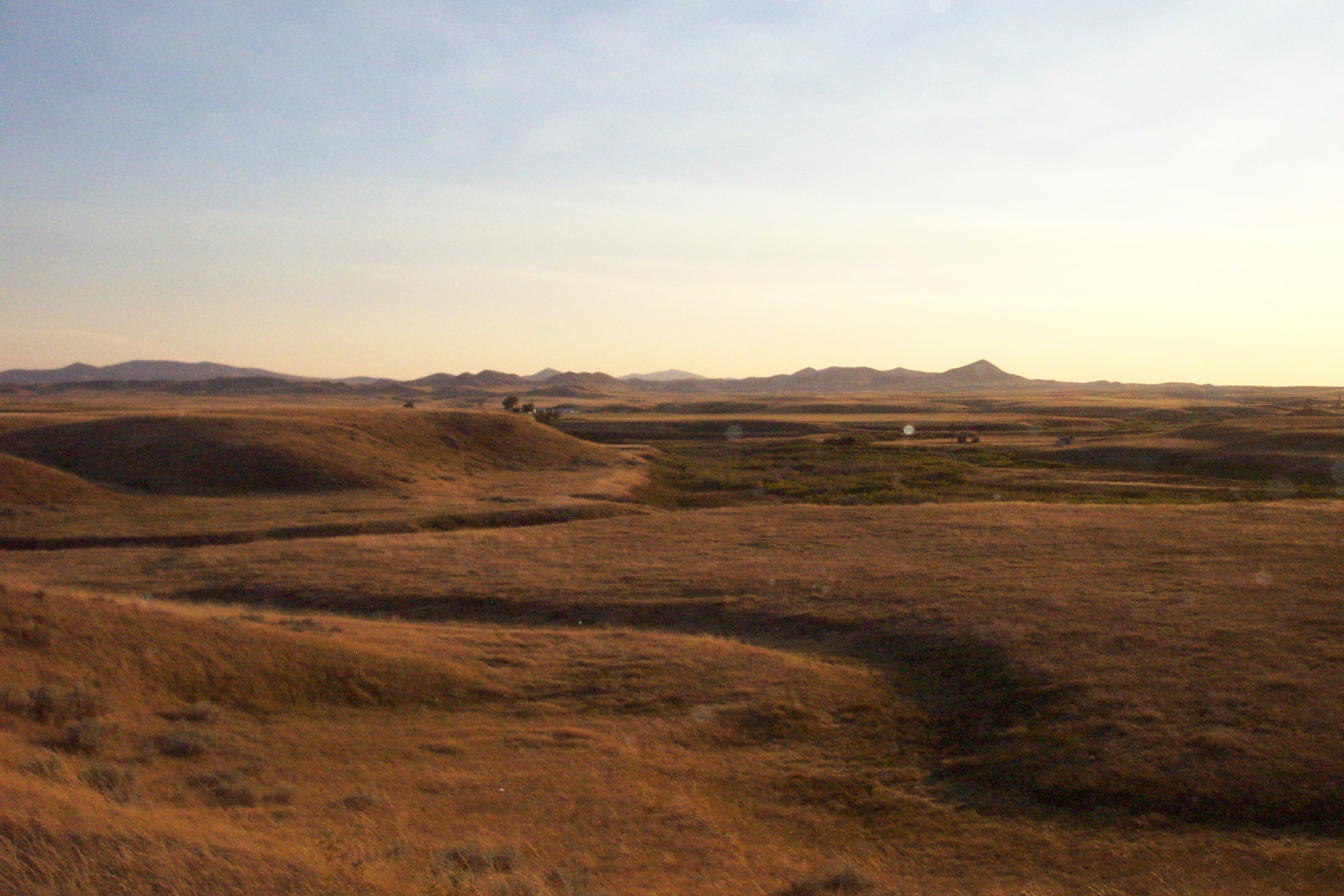
Bear Paw Battlefield, where the last battle of the Nez Perce War was fought and Chief Joseph gave his surrender speech.

By the time Chief Joseph formally surrendered on October 5, 1877, 2:20 pm, European Americans described him as the principal chief of the Nez Perce and the strategist behind the Nez Perce's skilled fighting retreat. The American press referred to him as "the Red Napoleon" for the military prowess attributed to him, but the Nez Perce bands involved in the war did not consider him a war chief. Joseph's younger brother, Ollokot; Poker Joe, and Looking Glass of the Alpowai band were among those who formulated the fighting strategy and tactics and led the warriors in battle, while Joseph was responsible for guarding the camp.

Chief Joseph became immortalized by his famous speech:

I am tired of fighting. Our chiefs are killed. Looking Glass is dead. Toohoolhoolzoote is dead. The old men are all dead. It is the young men who say, "Yes" or "No." He who led the young men [Ollokot] is dead. It is cold, and we have no blankets. The little children are freezing to death. My people, some of them, have run away to the hills, and have no blankets, no food. No one knows where they are – perhaps freezing to death. I want to have time to look for my children and see how many of them I can find. Maybe I shall find them among the dead. Hear me, my chiefs! I am tired. My heart is sick and sad. From where the sun now stands I will fight no more forever.

Joseph's speech was translated by the interpreter Arthur Chapman and was transcribed by Howard's aide-de-camp Lieutenant C. E. S. Wood. Among other vocations, Wood was a writer and a poet. His poem, "The Poet in the Desert" (1915), was a literary success, and some critics have suggested that he may have taken poetic license and embellished Joseph's speech.

== Aftermath ==
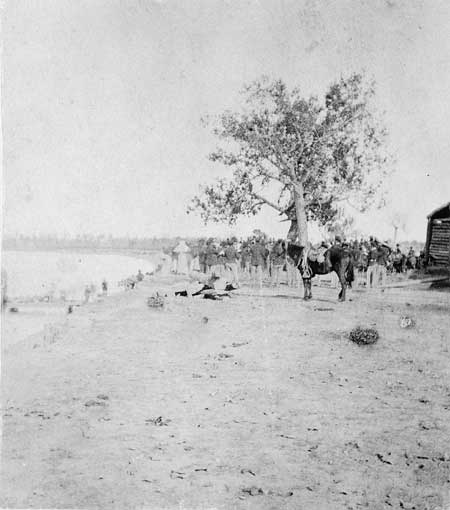
The Nez Perce prisoners arrive at the Tongue River Cantonment on October 23.

In total, the Nez Perce engaged 2,000 American soldiers of different military units, as well as their Indian auxiliaries. They fought "eighteen engagements, including four major battles and at least four fiercely contested skirmishes." Many people praised the Nez Perce for their exemplary conduct and skilled fighting ability. The Montana newspaper New North-West stated: "Their warfare since they entered Montana has been almost universally marked so far by the highest characteristics recognized by civilized nations. "

During the surrender negotiations, Howard and Miles had promised Joseph that the Nez Perce would be allowed to return to their reservation in Idaho. But, the commanding general of the Army, William Tecumseh Sherman, overruled them and directed that the Nez Perce were sent to Kansas. "I believed General Miles, or I never would have surrendered," Chief Joseph said afterward.

Miles marched his captives 265 miles (426 km) to the Tongue River Cantonment in southeast Montana Territory, where they arrived on October 23, 1877, and were held until Oct. 31. The able-bodied warriors were marched out to Fort Buford, at the confluence of the Yellowstone and Missouri rivers. On November 1, women, children, the ill and the wounded set out for Fort Buford in fourteen Mackinaw boats.

Between November 8 and 10, the Nez Perce left Fort Buford for Custer's post command at the time of his death; Fort Abraham Lincoln across the Missouri River from Bismarck in the Dakota Territory. About two hundred left in the mackinaws on November 9 guarded by two companies of the First Infantry; the rest traveled on horseback escorted by troops of the Seventh Cavalry en route to their winter quarters.

A majority of Bismarck's citizens turned out to welcome the Nez Perce prisoners, providing a lavish buffet for them and their troop escort. On November 23, the Nez Perce prisoners had their lodges and equipment loaded into freight cars and themselves into eleven rail coaches for the trip via train to Fort Leavenworth in Kansas.

One of the most extraordinary Indian Wars of which there is any record. the Indians displayed a courage and skill that elicited universal praise. They abstained from scalping: let captive women go free; did not commit indiscriminate murder of peaceful families, which as usual, and fought with almost scientific skill, using advance and rear guards, skirmish lines and field fortifications.

— General William Tecumseh Sherman,

Over the protests to Sherman by the commander of the Fort, the Nez Perce were forced to live in a swampy bottomland. One author described the effects on the Nez Perce refugees: "the 400 miserable, helpless, emaciated specimens of humanity, subjected for months to the malarial atmosphere of the river bottom."

Chief Joseph went to Washington in January 1879 to plead that his people be allowed to return to Idaho or, at least, be given land in Indian Territory, what would become Oklahoma. He met with the President and Congress, and his account was published in the North American Review. While he was greeted with acclaim, the U.S. government did not grant his petition due to fierce opposition in Idaho. Instead, Joseph and the Nez Perce were sent to Oklahoma and eventually located on a small reservation near Tonkawa, Oklahoma. Conditions in "the hot country" were hardly better than they had been at Leavenworth.

In 1885, Joseph and 268 surviving Nez Perce were finally allowed to return to the Pacific Northwest. Joseph, however, was not permitted to return to the Nez Perce reservation but instead settled at the Colville Indian Reservation in Washington. He died there in 1904.

== Depictions in media ==
=== Books ===
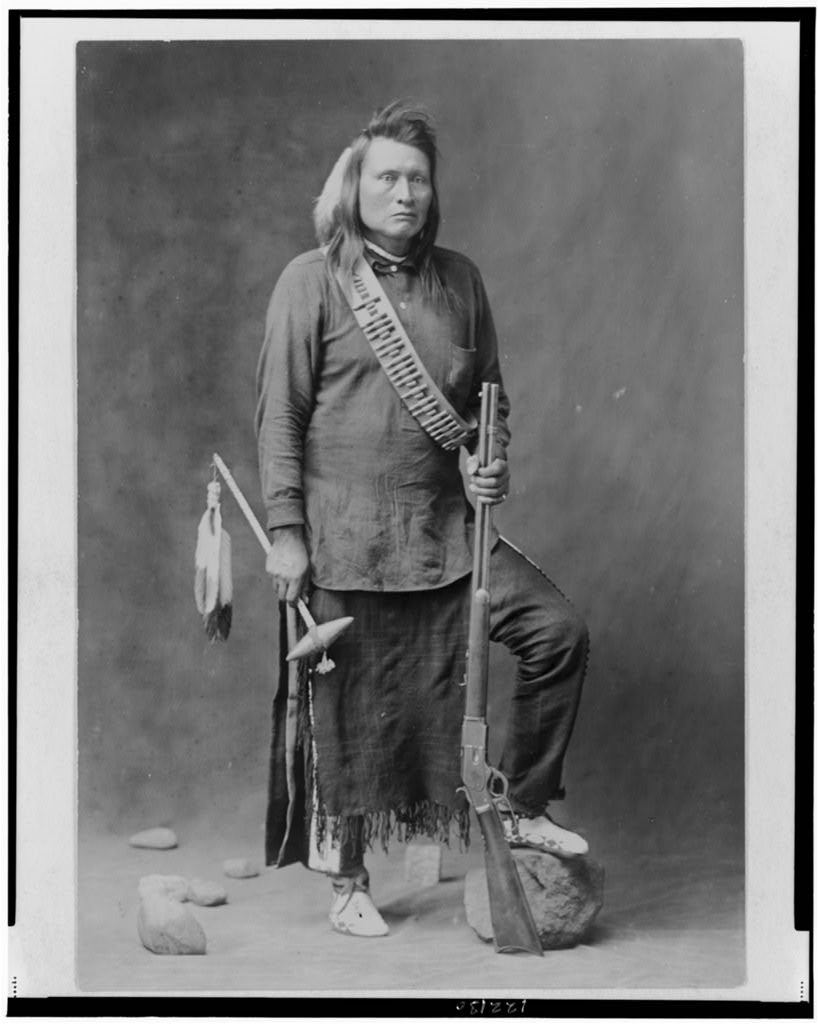
Yellow Wolf, 1877

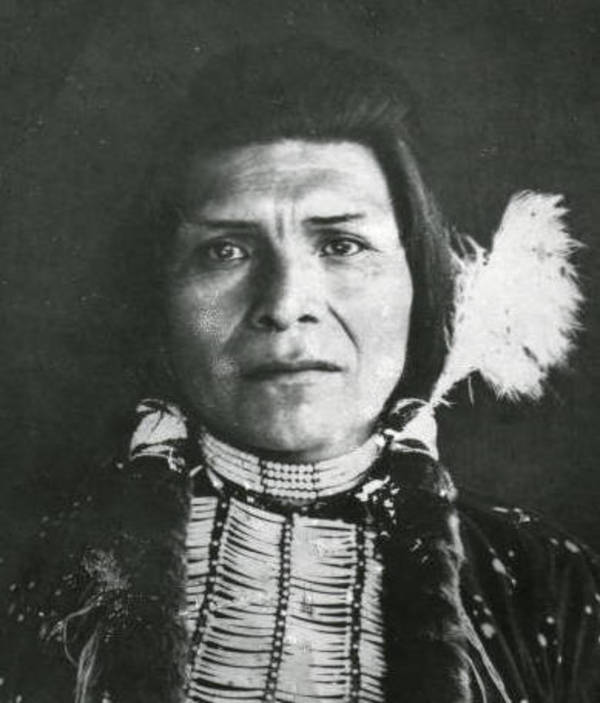
Peo Peo Tholekt, a Nez Perce warrior who helped capture the mountain howitzer at the Battle of the Big Hole

General Oliver Otis Howard was the commanding officer of U.S. troops pursuing the Nez Perce during the Nez Perce War of 1877. In 1881, he published an account of Joseph and the war, Nez Perce Joseph: An Account of His Ancestors, His Lands, His Confederates, His Enemies, His Murders, His War, His Pursuit and Capture, depicting the Nez Perce campaign.

The Nez Perce perspective was represented by Yellow Wolf: His Own Story, published in 1944 by Lucullus Virgil McWhorter, who had interviewed Yellow Wolf, a Nez Perce warrior. This book is very critical of the U.S. military's role in the war, and especially of General Howard. McWhorter also wrote Hear Me, My Chiefs!, published after his death. It was based on documentary sources and had material supporting the historical claims of each side.

The fifth volume of William T. Vollmann's Seven Dreams cycle, The Dying Grass, offers a detailed account of the conflict.

=== Television ===
The 1975 David Wolper historical teledrama I Will Fight No More Forever, starring Ned Romero as Joseph and James Whitmore as General Howard, was well received at a time when Native American issues were receiving wider exposure in the culture. The drama was notable for attempting to present a balanced view of the events: the leadership pressures on Joseph were juxtaposed with the Army's having to carry out an unpopular task while an action-hungry press establishment looked on.

=== Song ===
Folk singer Fred Small's 1983 song "The Heart of the Appaloosa" describes the events of the Nez Perce War, highlighting the Nez Perce's skillful use of the Appaloosa in battle and in flight. The lyrics identify Chief Joseph's Nez Perce name, which translates as "Thunder Rolling Down the Mountain," and quotes extensively from his "I will fight no more forever" speech.

Texas country band Micky & the Motorcars released the song "From Where the Sun Now Stands" on their 2014 album Hearts from Above. The song chronicles the flight of the Nez Perce through Idaho and Montana.

== Preservation ==
Many sites associated with the Nez Perce and their pursuit by the U.S. Army are today part of Nez Perce National Historical Park, including Big Hole National Battlefield. The Nez Perce National Historical Trail connects some of the sites.

== See also ==
- Indian Campaign Medal
