= Cornelius Leahy =

Cornelius Leahy is the name of:

- Con Leahy (1876–1921), Irish athlete
- Cornelius J. Leahy (1872–1900), Private in the United States Army, Medal of Honor recipient
