= Army and Navy Union of the United States of America =

Organization of U.S. veterans

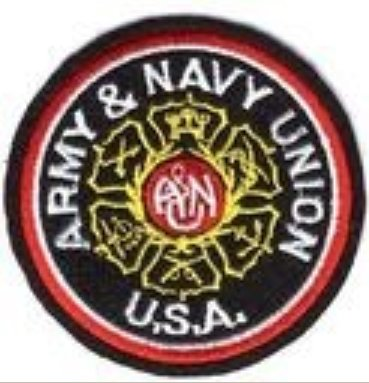
- Badge
- Abbreviation: A&NU
- Predecessor: The Regular Soldiers' Union
- Formation: March 31, 1888; 138 years ago
- Legal status: Federally chartered corporation
- Purpose: To alleviate suffering among soldiers and sailors
- Headquarters: Niles, Ohio
- Location: United States
- Services: Employment assistance, caring for the sick, burial service help
- Members: Veterans and active duty personnel of United States Armed Forces
- Official language: English
- Commander: Don Youngblood
- Website: Official website
- Formerly called: The Regular Soldiers' Union

The Army and Navy Union (A&NU), formally the Army and Navy Union of the United States of America is the oldest veterans' organization in the United States. It was organized on March 31, 1888, in Ohio. Its name changed over time from just a soldier's union to take account for all sailors and soldiers in all branches of the United States Armed Forces.

Its membership is open to all those who had served honorably or are serving members of the U.S. Armed Forces. The mission and purpose of the organization is to alleviate suffering of veterans or active duty personnel by providing needed services with the help of fraternal comradeship.

== History ==
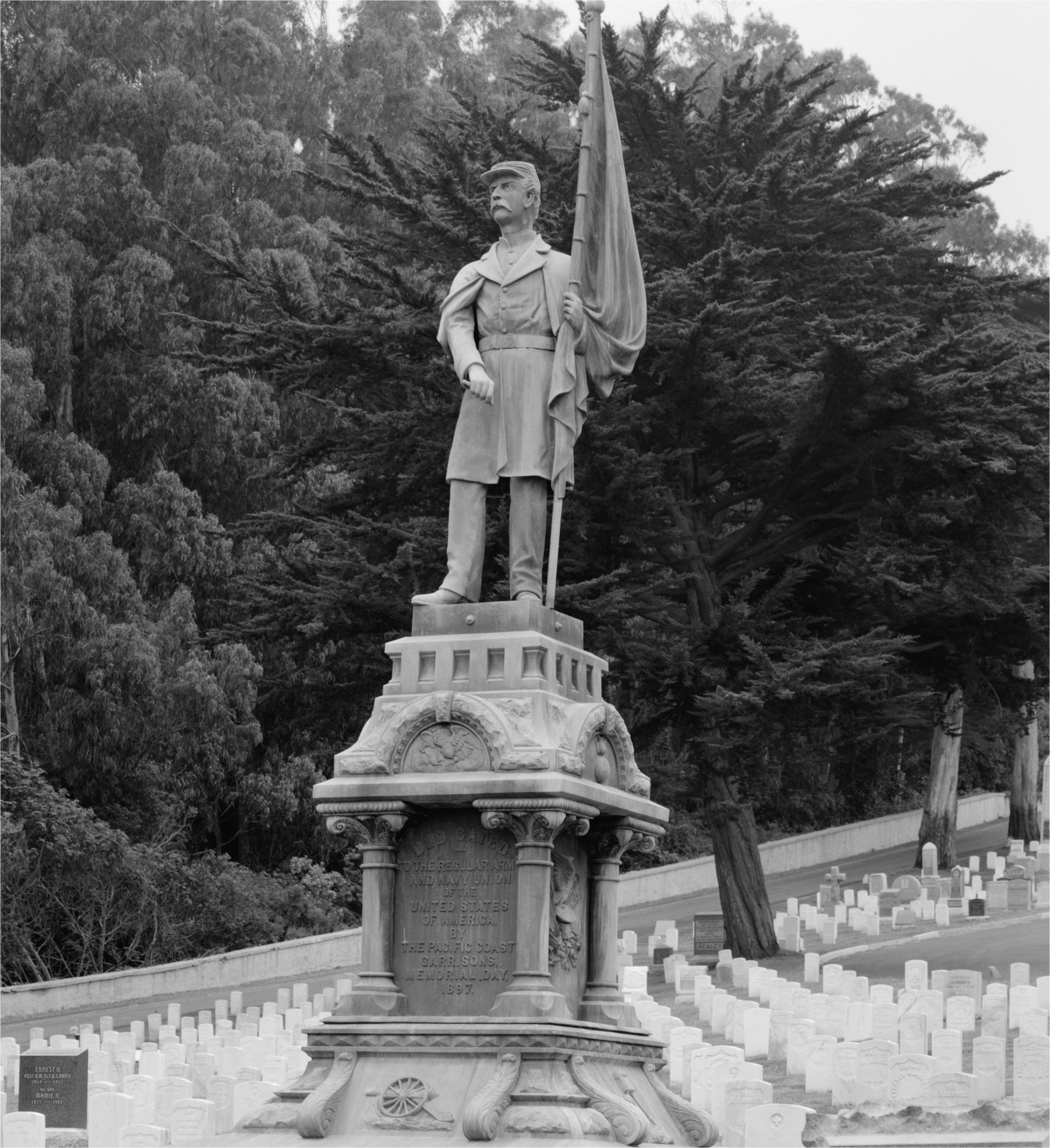
Army and Navy Union monument

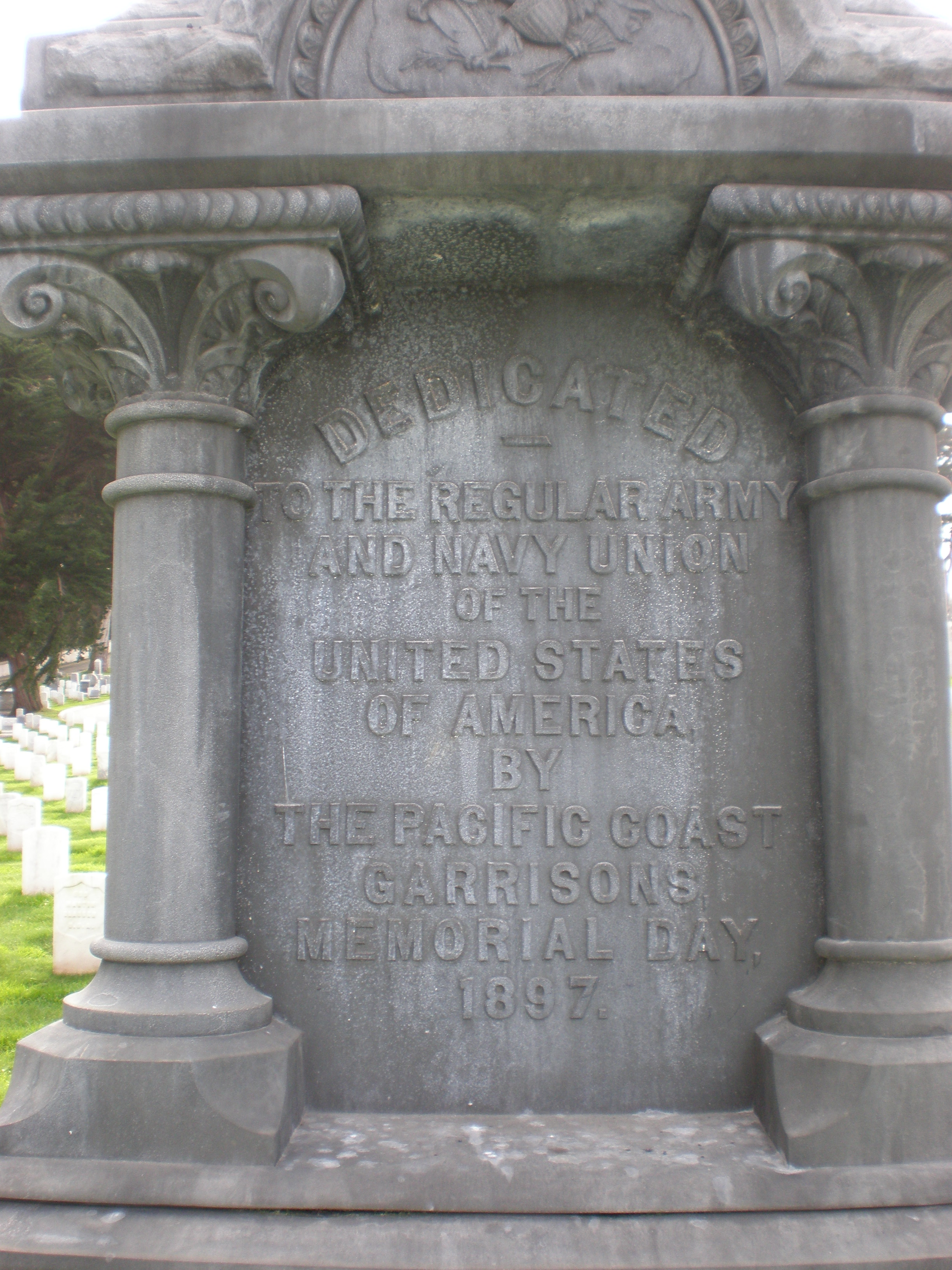
The monument inscription at base

The basis of the organization came in 1841. The organization transmuted further from other war fighting groups like The General Society of the War of 1812, The Grand Army of the Republic and The Order of Indian Wars. All these had the same general philosophy, so had a common ground. By 1886, it was realized that these organizations would naturally become extinct due to deaths of the veterans if something wasn't done to give them new life. The idea came about to restructure all these individual organizations into one permanent organization. These fighting group organizations founded the Army and Navy Union of the United States of America that was open to all who had served honorably or are serving in the United States Armed Forces.

A bill was introduced on July 17, 1985, in ninety-ninth Congress (1985–1986) to recognize the Army and Navy Union of the United States of America. It was signed by then US President Ronald Reagan to be put into force from November 6, 1986. This patriotic organization (Note: Under U.S. Code Title 36, Subtitle II (Patriotic and National Organizations) of Part B (Organizations) as chapter 229.) was originally formed in Ohio by 30 men as "The Regular Soldiers' Union" on March 31, 1888. The organization's name was amended to "Regular Army and Navy Union of the United States of America" on November 11, 1891. It was then reincorporated under the laws of Ohio on October 15, 1897. It was made official throughout the United States on October 19, 1899. The federally chartered corporation is an organization under U.S. Code Title 36, Subtitle II (Patriotic and National Organizations) of Part B (Organizations) as chapter 229.

== Notable incidents and contributions ==
In February 1897, it was announced in the San Francisco Call newspaper that a stone monument to the memory of dead soldiers and sailors was to be raised at the United States national cemetery, located in the Presidio of San Francisco, California. It was placed northeast of the Officer's Circle and finished on May 30. The veteran monument was dedicated on the following day, the Memorial Day, to the memory of past soldiers, sailors, and marines of the United States by the Army and Navy Union. There is an inscription on the front that says it was put up by the Pacific Coast garrisons.

The 17.2 feet (5.2 m) monument has on top of the base an 8.4 feet (2.6 m) statue of a soldier defending the flag. On the base is displayed the coat of arms of the United States and a stack of arms. There is also an image of light artillery on the front bottom. On the right cap is a flaming shell, on the die the American flag and jack, drums, and cannonballs. The initiative to provide the monument was by 11 California garrison .

The Wisconsin department of the Army and Navy Union announced that it was on record as of August 1930 as favoring the state option of repealing the Eighteenth Amendment to the United States Constitution. The department was planning to pass on their commitment to the national convention at Buffalo, New York, in October that they favored individual state laws instead on liquor control.

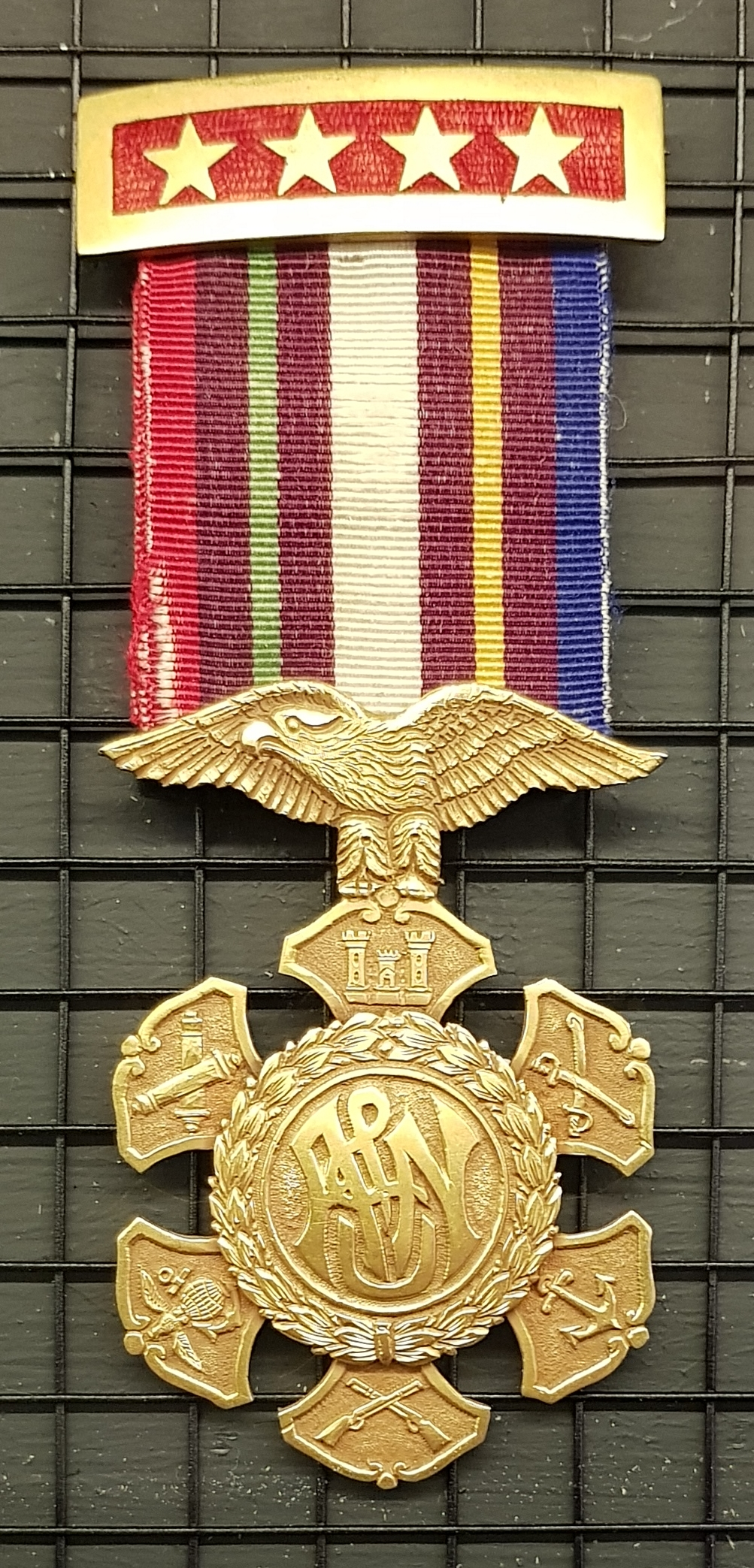
Commemorative Medal of the Union of Army and Navy awarded to General Haller

The Army and Navy Union awarded publisher William Randolph Hearst the Gold Medal of Honor for distinguished service in June 1945. The Kings County division of the Union was awarded a plaque for outstanding service to convalescent sailors by the Brooklyn Naval Hospital on May 24, 1946. The Brooklyn Navy Yard garrison sponsored a reception at their headquarters on May 25, 1946, for Lieutenant Charles W. Shea, the recipient of Medal of Honor, and Colonel Richard E. Cole who had just returned from overseas duty. The Union through their Cincinnati, Ohio, division adopted a resolution on August 13, 1948, asking the government to provide a bonus for World War II veterans.

A district supreme court chief justice decided at the end of 1906 that a higher organization body cannot confiscate the property of one of the Union's garrisons. The decision then did not restrict admitting someone and/or their funds they were entitled to, to be admitted into a particular garrison.

The Army and Navy Union of the United States of America provided medals of honor to certain union soldiers in 1905, who volunteered for duties above and beyond the call of duty. Their service, of which they did not receive pay for, was done in Maryland and Pennsylvania in 1863 during the American Civil War.

== Historical activities ==
On May 30, 1906, then US president, Theodore Roosevelt, delivered a memorial address to thousands at Portsmouth, Virginia under the auspices the Army and Navy Union that concluded with the unveiling of a monument erected at the local Naval Cemetery. The Union began its thirteenth biennial convention in the GAR Hall on Pennsylvania Avenue in Washington, D.C., on July 17, 1907. It was also the ninth anniversary of the Battle of Santiago de Cuba. They sent a telegram of fraternal greetings to President Roosevelt that morning. A few hours later they received a telegram back from the President's secretary of thanks and best wishes for success of the Union.

On September 8, 1909, the Army and Navy Union began its fourteenth biennial convention in Erie, Pennsylvania, at the local Chamber of Commerce. There were over 200 delegates that attended the opening session, among who were veterans of the American Civil War. The assembly sang "The Star-Spangled Banner" at the beginning. There were some women that attended, that were members of the Auxiliary to the Army and Navy Union. It was proposed at this assembly that Congress be petitioned for the raising and restoration of Perry's old ship Niagara.

On January 17, 1911, the Army and Navy Union announced its upcoming fifteenth biennial convention in Rochester, New York, at the local Chamber of Commerce for sometime in August. The time was being changed from the scheduled encampment in September, because of requests from the city Convention Committee. Two other conventions were to be scheduled at the same time in August, Grand Army of the Republic and the Ladies Auxiliary to the Army and Navy Union. At the fifteenth biennial convention that happened in the third week of August there were added ten thousand members from the Seamen's Gunners' League. This in effect doubled the size of the organization. A topic discussed at this convention was if any loyal woman from the Ladies Auxiliary could become a member of the Union.

On September 8, 1913, the Army and Navy Union began its sixteenth biennial national encampment convention in Philadelphia, Pennsylvania. Some of the delegates took a river steamer trip the next day and went up the Delaware River from the Arch street wharf to Port Richmond. They were shown various piers and shipbuilding yards and stopped at League Island. Colonel H. Ogden Lake was presented as the next commander of the national organization, since Commander Downs retired from the position. There were about a thousand delegates that attended this convention.

On September 20, 1915, the Army and Navy Union began its seventeenth biennial convention in Washington, D.C. The encampment was coordinated by General Oden Lake, their national commander. There were about 25,000 visitors during this convention, including members of the Army and Navy Union. There was a suite of rooms reserved at the New Willard Hotel for encampment headquarters from June 1 to September 30. A large parade was part of September convention, which involved all the veteran organizations of the Washington area garrisons. The program of events included a grand military ball and a banquet with high ranking government officials.

On September 12, 1917, the Army and Navy Union began its eighteenth biennial convention at the Bohemian Hall in Baltimore, Maryland. The welcome address was given by Maryland governor Emerson Harrington to 500 delegates. General Oden Lake also spoke at this convention and announced that he would not be running again as their national commander. The next day was scheduled a banquet reception and later in the week an old-time campfire event. Overall there were about 2000 visitors to this convention.

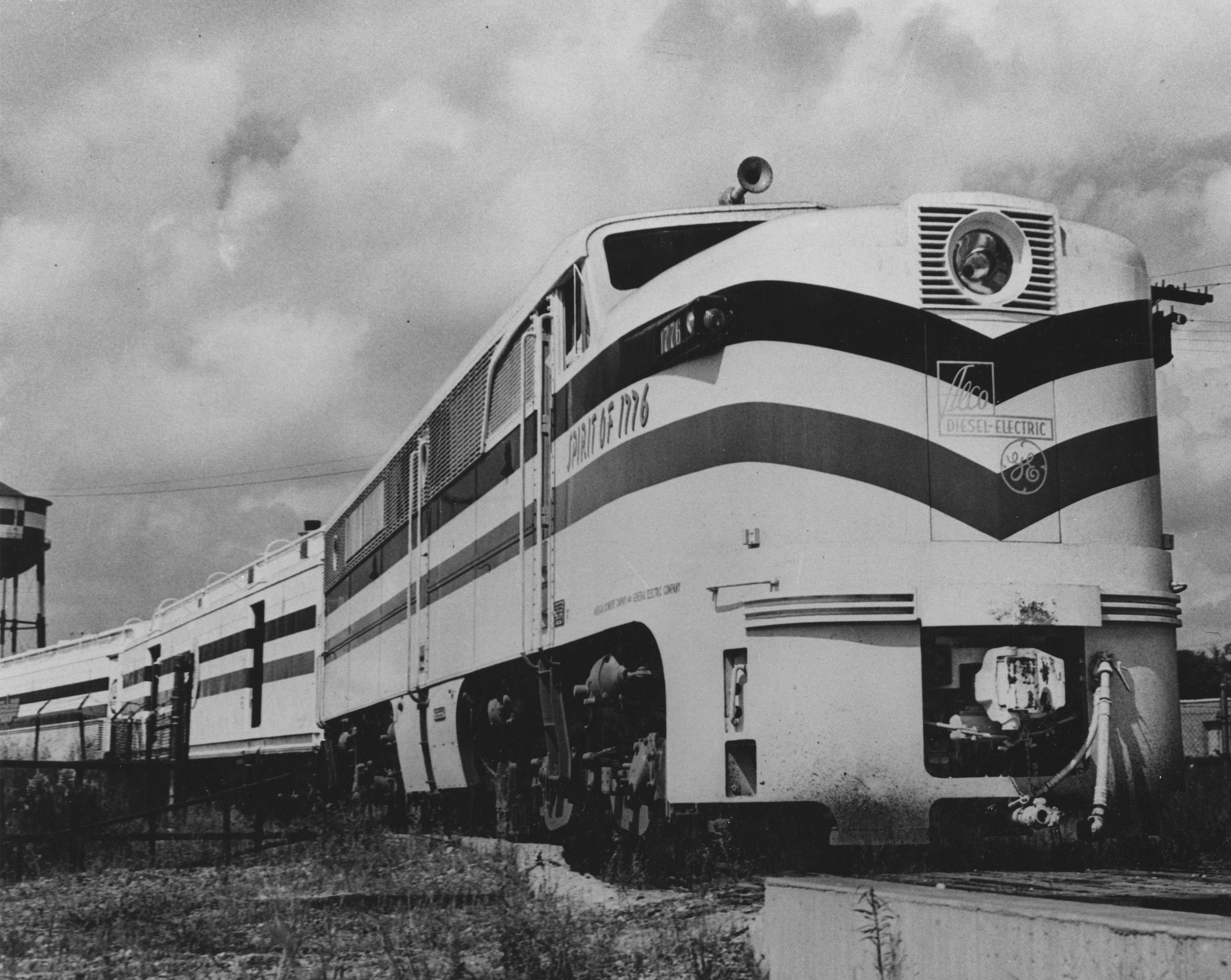
Freedom Train of 1947

On September 27, 1947, the Kings County council in New York City of the Army and Navy Union under the command of General Samuel Hoch made available an escort party for the families who were having their soldier dead brought home from World War II. The organization participants gathered at the Flatbush Post of the American Legion on Nostrand Ave at 9 AM to get their instructions from Hoch. He also coordinated the Brooklyn Naval Yard Garrison of the organization later, that participated in the Freedom Train Brooklyn display at the Vanderveer Park freight yards of the Long Island Rail Road. There were thousands that saw the one-day Brooklyn event that displayed Americana and original nineteenth-century historical documents in the rail cars. Many were not able to get to see the displays that day and planned on viewing the next day when the train would stop a few miles away at Jamaica, Queens, New York.

== Badge and medals ==
The original badge of the Army and Navy Union was patented as design No. 21640 on June 21, 1892. The distinctive badge has been used since then and worn on public occasions and ceremonies by its members. The badge of the Army and Navy Union received can be worn on Army or Navy uniforms. The United States Congress in 1913 authorized the use condemned American Civil War cannons to be melted down to provide medals to the members of the organization.

== Qualifications and duties ==
There are no prescribed qualifications on time or length of service. The principal duty of the Army and Navy Union members is the upholding, guarding and protecting the integrity of the United States government and its constitution. Other duties include helping ex-service personnel who need help in getting employment, caring for the sick, and needed burial services.

The mission and purpose of the Army and Navy Union are to bind together in fraternal comradeship all comrades, shipmates, soldiers, sailors and marines, regular and volunteers, veterans of all wars in which the United States has been or may be engaged in. Besides patriotic, other purposes for the organization are for history and genealogy records. The main goal of the organization is to fraternally join all these veterans in a common semi-military group with similar backgrounds.

== Present organization ==
The Army and Navy Union's fundamental objective is national security and defense. Its overall purpose is to encourage and preserve fraternal comradeship among those who have rendered service in the United States Armed Forces. The organization has the ideal to continue high principles of patriotism, loyalty, justice, and service to the United States. It is the oldest veterans' organization in America.

The Army and Navy Union of the United States of America continues to operate garrisons in many states. Its National Headquarters is in Niles, Ohio. The national commander of as 2016 is Don Youngblood with his senior vice commander Raoul Helwig. Any person who received an honorable discharge from or is now serving in the armed forces (active or reserve components) of the United States of America is eligible to become a member. The following were listed on the Army and Navy Union's website in October 2016 as their garrisons scattered throughout the eastern United States.

- 1 Gen. George Washington Garrison, Cincinnati, Ohio
- 51 Garrison, New Jersey
- 52 Garrison, National Park, New Jersey
- 65 Defenses of Washington Garrison, DC
- 66 Garrison, Young Harris, Georgia
- 97 C. "Russ" Casto, Sr. Garrison, Columbus, Ohio
- 102 John W. Wagner Garrison, Akron, Ohio
- 137 Garrison, Marion, Ohio
- 146 Garrison, South Bend, Indiana
- 150 William F. Cody Garrison, Canton, Ohio
- 207 Harold "Jiggs" Jacobs Garrison
- 244 Niles Garrison, Niles, Ohio
- 250 Firestone Park Garrison, Akron, Ohio
- 252 Steve Hallock Garrison, Niles, Ohio
- 271 J.G. Chicko Garrison, Newton Falls, Ohio
- 273 Gen. A.C Voris Garrison, Lakemore, Ohio
- 283 Capt. Nathaniel Lang Garrison, Warren, Ohio
- 302 Lt Col Henry du Pont Garrison, Wilmington, Delaware
- 360 George C. Kuzman Garrison, Youngstown, Ohio
- 411 Ashtabula Garrison, Ashtabula, Ohio
- 422 John D. Massey Garrison, Girard, Ohio
- 426 Gerald Jones Garrison, Warren, Ohio
- 628 William F. Unger Garrison, Coshocton, Ohio
- 987 Dale Albright Garrison, Galion, Ohio
- 1978 Donald D. Graham Garrison
- 1982 Bolivar Army Navy Garrison, Bolivar, Ohio
- 1984 Garrison, Massillon, Ohio
- 1988 Shady Rest Garrison, Beach City, Ohio
- 2005 Marlin Dowden Memorial Army & Navy Garrison
- 2460 Garrison, Youngstown, Ohio
- 3697 Garrison, Largo, Florida

== Notes ==
Footnotes

Citations
