= Abraham DeSomer =

US Navy Medal of Honor recipient (1884–1974)

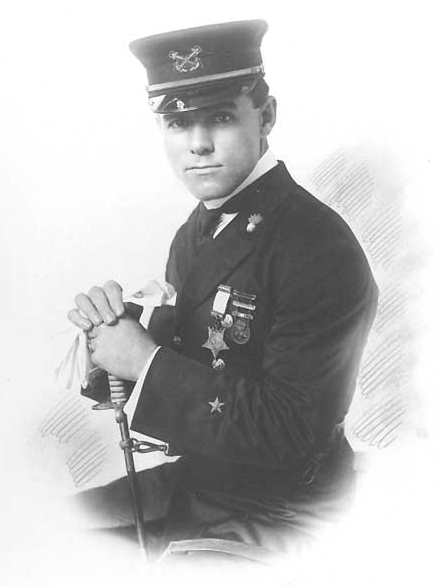
- Gunner Abraham DeSomer, October 1, 1916
- Born: December 29, 1884; Milwaukee, Wisconsin, US
- Died: August 31, 1974 (aged 89); Tacoma, Washington
- Burial place: San Francisco National Cemetery, San Francisco, California
- Military career
- Allegiance: United States of America
- Branch: United States Navy
- Service years: 1901–1932, 1940–1946
- Rank: Lieutenant commander
- Conflicts: United States occupation of Veracruz, 1914
- Awards: Medal of Honor

Abraham DeSomer (December 29, 1884 – August 31, 1974) was an enlisted man and later an officer in the United States Navy. He received America's highest military decoration – the Medal of Honor – for actions during the American intervention at Veracruz, Mexico.

== Biography ==
Abraham DeSomer was born on December 29, 1884, in Milwaukee, Wisconsin. In 1901, he enlisted in the United States Navy from that state. Following his initial sea duty on board the gunboat USS Yorktown in the Philippines, DeSomer transferred to the monitor USS Monadnock, which served on the Asiatic Station, and became a gunner's mate.

From 1907 to 1911, he was assigned to the battleship USS Nebraska. DeSomer was promoted to chief petty officer in 1910. A year later, he reported to the battleship USS Utah. While serving on that ship from 21 to 22 April 1914, during the intervention at Veracruz, Mexico, his "extraordinary heroism in the line of his profession" was recognized by the award of the Medal of Honor.

In February 1915 DeSomer was promoted to the warrant officer rank of gunner. During the next four years he served on the transport USS Hancock, the armored cruiser USS Montana and the battleship USS Minnesota. He was temporarily commissioned as an ensign in August 1917 and attained the rank of lieutenant in September 1918. In the spring of 1919, DeSomer transferred to Naval Training Center, Great Lakes, Illinois. He was made a permanent lieutenant in August 1920 and, a year later, reported to the newly commissioned battleship USS California.

DeSomer began two more years of training duty at Great Lakes in the summer of 1925, then was assigned to the destroyer tender USS Dobbin and the aircraft carrier USS Lexington before transferring in November 1930 to Naval Air Station, Pearl Harbor, Hawaii. Following more than thirty years of continuous service as an enlisted man and an officer, DeSomer retired in January 1932.

He returned to active duty in the summer of 1940, after the fall of France prompted a massive expansion of America's defenses. Promoted to lieutenant commander on the retired list in February 1942, he remained on active status through the war years, permanently retiring in 1946.

DeSomer died on August 31, 1974, and is buried at the San Francisco National Cemetery, San Francisco, California.

== Description of Medal of Honor action ==
In a letter dated 13 June 1914 to DeSomer, Josephus Daniels quoted Admiral F. F. Fletcher's summary of DeSomer's actions on 21–22 April 1914:

On the afternoon of April 21st, [DeSomer] was placed in charge of a small squad of men and stationed at the corner of a warehouse to eastward of the custom house. His position was subject to a severe fire from the buildings along Avenida Inadero y Cos, and after several hours of well directed fire he silenced it. On April 22d when a general advance began, he was sent ahead to locate and silence fire from snipers. Being an excellent marksman and notably cool, he was especially selected for this work. Later, when two sections of artillery were sent to join Captain Anderson's command, he performed similar services and was almost continually under direct fire from snipers. His services in this connection were of more value than a whole squad.

—Frank Friday Fletcher

Daniels concluded with:

The Department concurs with the opinion of Rear Admiral Fletcher and highly commends your conspicuous courage, coolness and skill, which were in accord with and added to the best traditions of the naval service. ... In addition a Medal of Honor and a gratuity of One Hundred Dollars has been awarded you.

—Josephus Daniels

== Awards ==
- Medal of Honor
- Good Conduct Medal
- Philippine Campaign Medal
- Mexican Service Medal
- World War I Victory Medal with "ESCORT" clasp
- American Defense Service Medal
- American Campaign Medal
- World War II Victory Medal

=== Medal of Honor citation ===
Rank and organization: Lieutenant, United States Navy, U.S.S. Utah. Place and date: Vera Cruz, Mexico, 21 and April 22, 1914. Entered service at: Wisconsin. Birth: Milwaukee, Wis.

Citation:

On board the U.S.S. Utah, for extraordinary heroism in the line of his profession during the seizure of Vera Cruz, Mexico, 21 and April 22, 1914.

== See also ==
- List of Medal of Honor recipients (Veracruz)
