= George W. Wallace =

George Weed Wallace
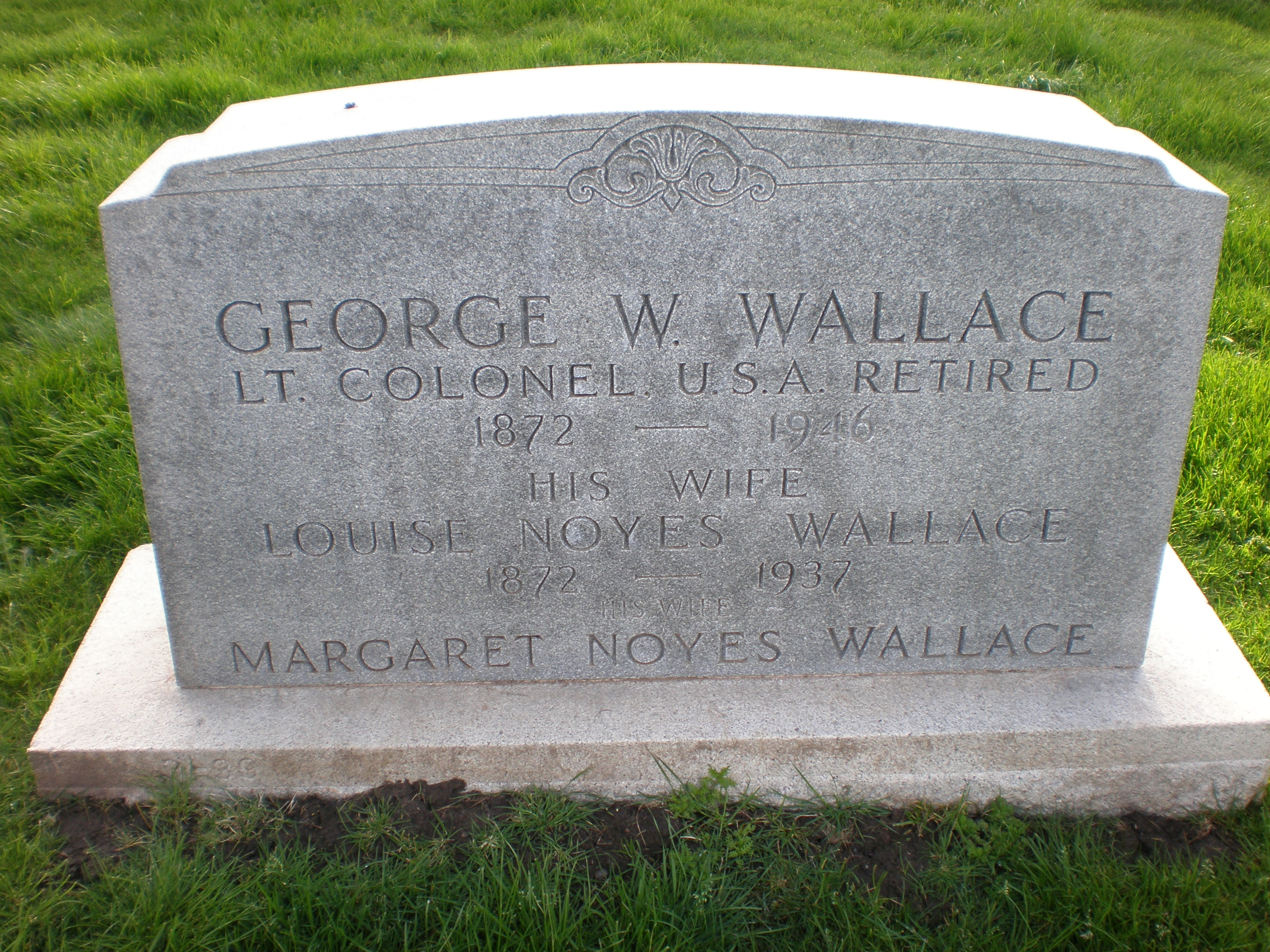
- Wallace's headstone at San Francisco National Cemetery
- Born: May 25, 1872; Fort Riley, Kansas
- Died: May 22, 1946 (aged 73)
- Burial place: San Francisco National Cemetery
- Military career
- Allegiance: United States of America
- Branch: United States Army
- Service years: 1899 – 1919
- Rank: Lieutenant Colonel
- Unit: 9th U.S. Infantry
- Conflicts: Philippine–American War
- Awards: Medal of Honor

George Weed Wallace (May 25, 1872 – May 22, 1946) was a Second Lieutenant in the United States Army and a Medal of Honor recipient for his actions in the Philippine–American War. Wallace later rose to the rank of lieutenant colonel, and retired in 1919. He is buried at San Francisco National Cemetery.

== Medal of Honor citation ==
Rank and organization: Second Lieutenant, 9th U.S. Infantry. Place and date: At Tinuba, Luzon, Philippine Islands, March 4, 1900. Entered service at: Denver, Colo. Birth: Fort Riley, Kans. Date of issue: June 25, 1900.

Citation:

With another officer and a native Filipino, was shot at from an ambush, the other officer falling severely wounded. 2d Lt. Wallace fired in the direction of the enemy, put them to rout, removed the wounded officer from the path, returned to the town, a mile distant, and summoned assistance from his command.

== See also ==
- List of Philippine–American War Medal of Honor recipients
