= Matthias W. Day =

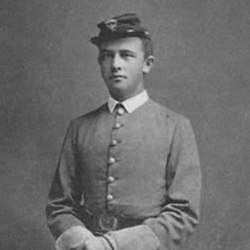
- Day while an officer of the 9th Cavalry Regiment
- Born: August 8, 1853; Mansfield, Ohio, US
- Died: September 12, 1927 (aged 74); Los Angeles, California, US
- Burial place: San Francisco National Cemetery
- Military career
- Allegiance: United States of America
- Branch: United States Army; United States Cavalry
- Service years: 1878–1912
- Rank: Colonel
- Nicknames: "Matt", "Daisy"
- Unit: 9th Cavalry Regiment
- Commands: Apache scouts 1st Ohio Volunteer Cavalry Regiment; 9th Cavalry Regiment
- Conflicts: American Indian Wars; Philippine–American War
- Awards: Medal of Honor

Matthias W. Day (August 8, 1853 – September 12, 1927) was a career American army officer who received the Medal of Honor, the United States' highest military decoration, for his actions during the American Indian Wars in the latter half of the 19th century. Day was a longtime officer with the African-American 9th Cavalry Regiment, seeing action during the Apache Wars against the Apache leaders Victorio and Geronimo.

Day later achieved fame as a marksman while participating in the U.S. Army's annual rifle marksmanship contest, and served in the Philippines during the Philippine–American War. He eventually rose to the rank of colonel and served as the commander of his old unit, the 9th Cavalry.

== West Point ==
Matthias Walter Day was the second of seven children of Mathias Day (the founder of Daytona Beach, Florida) and Mary Blymyer, both native Ohioans. He was accepted to the United States Military Academy at West Point in 1873. A graduate of the class of 1877 alongside Henry Ossian Flipper, the first African-American to graduate from West Point, Day was popular with his classmates, but was "ranked close enough to the bottom to be assigned to a black regiment".

Day was not assigned to the 9th Cavalry Regiment until August 1878. The 9th Cavalry was one of four African-American regiments which became known as the "Buffalo Soldiers". Day was ordered to El Paso, Texas, where he assumed command of A Troop.

== Service in the American Indian Wars ==
In 1879, Day and his troop were transferred west to New Mexico where they joined the rest of the regiment. After the Apache chief Victorio launched two successful raids on 9th Cavalry outposts near the Warm Springs Reservation after he left the San Carlos Reservation on August 21, the rest of the regiment was mobilized to go after him, marking the beginning of the Victorio Campaign.

On the morning of September 18, Day, along with Captain Byron Dawson and twenty-two men of Troops A and B together with three Navajo Scouts, were following Victorio's trail through Las Animas Canyon in New Mexico. Here, they fell into an ambush, with the Apache above them on three sides of the canyon pinning them down with rifle fire. They were subsequently reinforced by two companies led by Captain Charles Beyer, which made contact with them but were unable to drive the Apaches from their positions.

By the end of the day, the trapped troopers were running low on ammunition. His own ammunition supply running short, Beyer ordered a withdrawal and had Dawson withdraw his men under covering fire to avoid encirclement. Day noticed two wounded men caught out in the open some distance from their position, exposed to enemy fire and unable to move. Assisted by Sergeant John Denny, who helped support one man, Day carried the other on his back through "a hail of bullets so thick it seemed 'no one could pass this open rocky space alive'" to safety.

Despite his heroism, Captain Beyer was furious with Day for disobeying orders and his commanding officer, Lieutenant Colonel Nathan Dudley, wanted to court-martial him. However, Day was later cleared by a board of inquiry and subsequently received the Medal of Honor on May 7, 1890. John Denny and Second Lieutenant Robert Temple Emmet, who like Day had graduated from West Point in 1877, also received the Medal of Honor for their actions at Las Animas Canyon.

Following Las Animas Canyon, the 9th Cavalry continued its pursuit of Victorio, but he was able to escape across the Mexican border. Taking a break from campaigning, Day was married on Thanksgiving Day, 1879, to Emilia Schultz, his wedding attended by Governor Lew Wallace. He resumed campaigning against Victorio in 1880, but apart from two actions in which he was involved in the early part of the year, served as a staff adjutant and later returned to command of A Troop, seeing little action. Victorio was later killed by Mexican forces in October.

In late 1881, the 9th Cavalry was transferred to the Southern Plains. Day was promoted to first lieutenant in 1884 and assigned to I Troop, which was stationed at Fort Reno near present-day Oklahoma City. The troop was responsible for removing white settlers known as "Boomers" from the Unassigned Lands located in the middle of what is now the state of Oklahoma. During this time, Day became something of a celebrity through his skill as a marksman by winning the annual rifle marksmanship contest for the U.S. Army's Division of the Missouri. He also captained the team which represented the Division of the Missouri in competition against opposing teams from the Divisions of the Atlantic, Pacific, and artillery. The team won the long-distance target shooting competition and Day himself was acknowledged to be "'the best skirmisher'" when involved in a competition that involved "shooting at targets under conditions 'that were an approximation to actual service'".

In early 1885, the 9th Cavalry was reposted to Wyoming and Nebraska. Day volunteered for service with the Apache scouts when he learned that the army was in need of officers with desert experience. He participated in a lengthy, strenuous pursuit of Geronimo later in the year that engaged the Apache leader twice and nearly captured him once. Day was eventually reassigned to the 9th Cavalry and served as its regimental quartermaster, a position that he held after the close of the Indian Wars in 1890.

== Later career ==
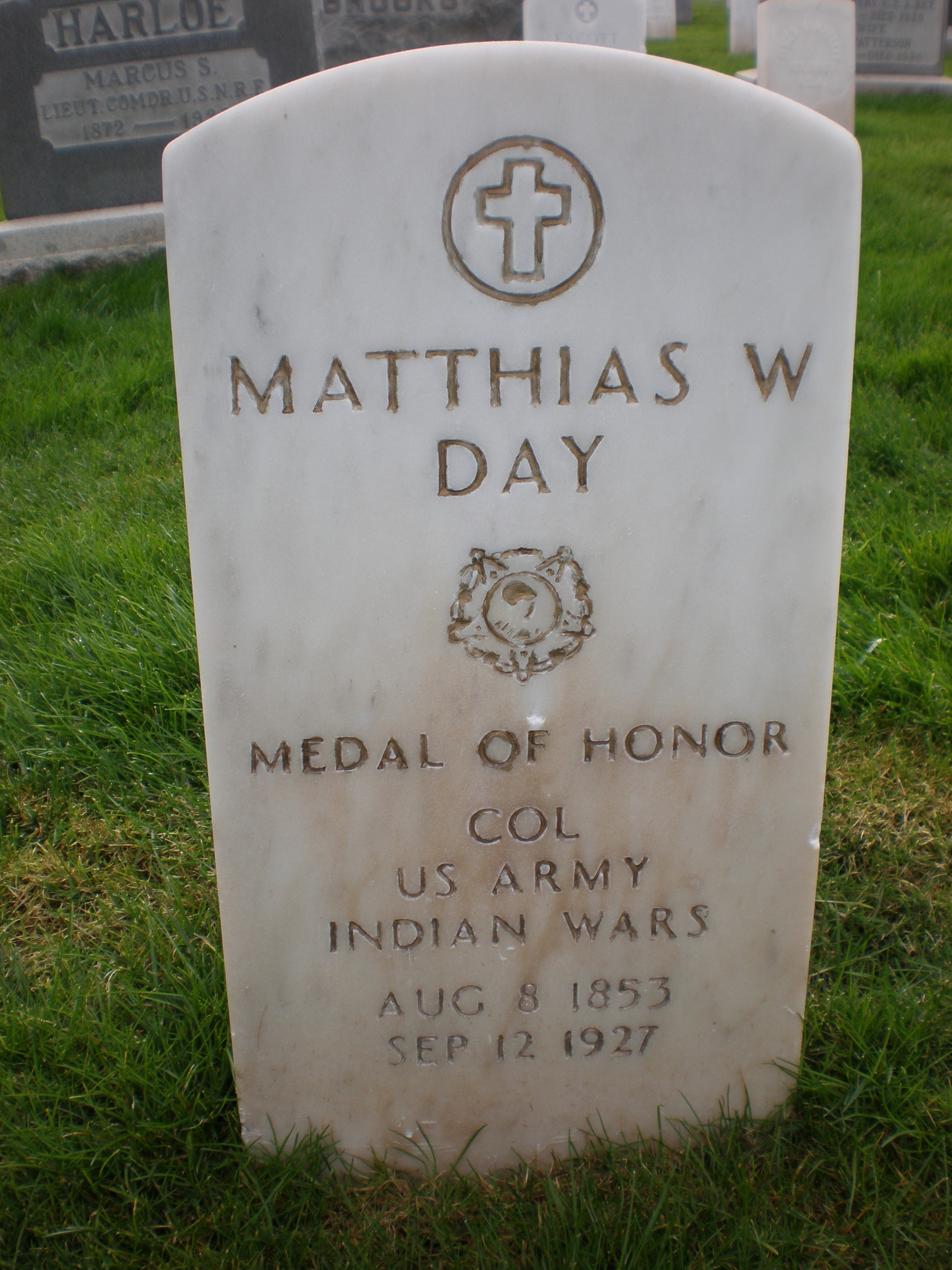
Day's headstone at San Francisco National Cemetery

From 1891 to 1895, Day was professor of Military Science and Tactics at Mount Union College in Alliance, Ohio.

After the United States declared war on Spain on April 21, 1898, Captain Day was commissioned a lieutenant colonel of volunteers and assigned to command the 1st Ohio Volunteer Cavalry Regiment, which had been reactivated after being mustered out at the end of the American Civil War. The 1st Ohio was a part of the Second Cavalry Brigade which included among its regiments the 1st United States Volunteer Cavalry, better known as the Rough Riders.

The 1st Ohio reported to Port Tampa, Florida on July 12, for transportation to Cuba, but its sailing was delayed due to a shortage of transports and as a result, the regiment did not see action in the Spanish–American War. Day however, later saw action in the Philippines against the Moros. After postings to various units, he served as the colonel of his old unit, the 9th Cavalry, for a year before retiring from the army in 1912.

Day died on September 12, 1927, in Los Angeles, California. He is buried in the San Francisco National Cemetery.

== Medal of Honor citation ==
Rank and organization: Second Lieutenant, 9th U.S. Cavalry. Place and date: At Las Animas Canyon, N. Mex., September 18, 1879. Entered service at: Oberlin, Ohio. Birth: Mansfield, Ohio. Date of issue: May 7, 1890.

Citation:

Advanced alone into the enemy's lines and carried off a wounded soldier of his command under a hot fire and after he had been ordered to retreat.

== See also ==
- List of Medal of Honor recipients
- List of Medal of Honor recipients for the Indian Wars
