= Reuben Jasper Phillips =

United States Marine Corps Medal of Honor recipient

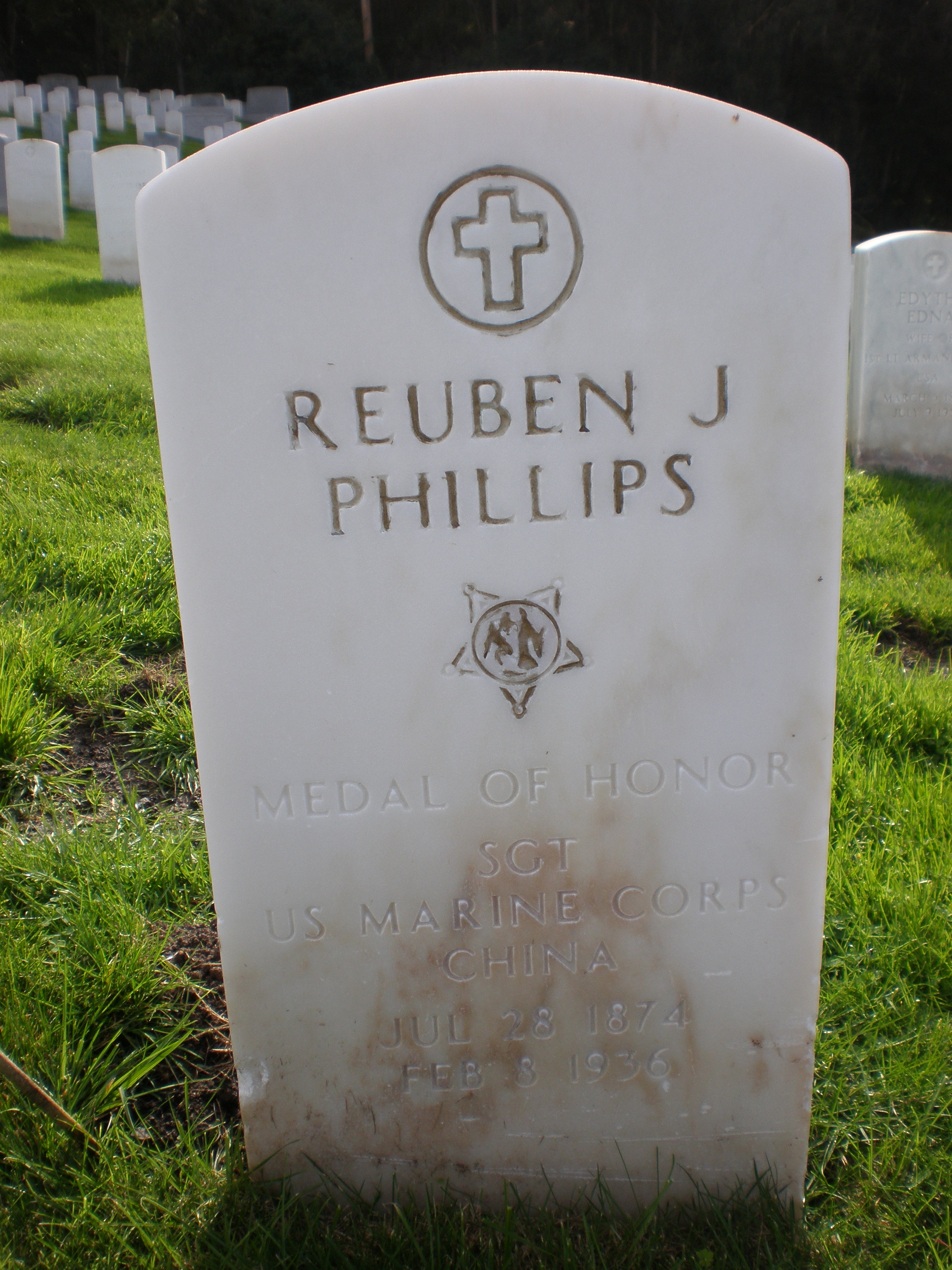
- Phillips' gravestone in San Francisco National Cemetery
- Born: July 28, 1874; Cambria, California
- Died: February 8, 1936 (aged 61)
- Burial place: San Francisco National Cemetery, San Francisco, California
- Military career
- Allegiance: United States
- Branch: United States Marine Corps
- Service years: 1898–1903
- Rank: Sergeant
- Conflicts: Boxer Rebellion
- Awards: Medal of Honor

Reuben J. Phillips (July 28, 1874 – February 8, 1936) was a United States Marine serving during the Boxer Rebellion who received the Medal of Honor for bravery.

== Biography ==
Phillips was born July 28, 1874, in Cambria, California and enlisted into the Marine Corps from Mare Island, California July 16, 1898. After entering the Marine Corps he was sent to fight in the Chinese Boxer Rebellion.

He received the Medal for his actions in China on 13 and 20–22 June 1900 and it was presented to him July 19, 1901.

He was discharged from the Marine Corps on July 21, 1903, at the rank of sergeant. He died February 8, 1936, and is buried in San Francisco National Cemetery, San Francisco, California.

== Medal of Honor citation ==
Rank and organization: Corporal, U.S. Marine Corps. Born: 28 July 1874, Cambria, Calif. Accredited to: California. G.O. No.: 55, 19 July 1901.

Citation:

In action with the relief expedition of the Allied forces in China during the battles of 13, 20, 21 and 22 June 1900. Throughout this period and in the presence of the enemy, Phillips distinguished himself by meritorious conduct.

== See also ==
- List of Medal of Honor recipients
- List of Medal of Honor recipients for the Boxer Rebellion
