= Dunagan =

Dunagan is a surname. Notable people with the surname include:

- Deanna Dunagan (born 1940), American actress
- Donnie Dunagan (1934–2026), American former child actor
- Kern W. Dunagan (1934–1991), American military officer
- Sandra Deal (née Dunagan), wife of Georgia governor Nathan Deal
