= William Allen (soldier) =

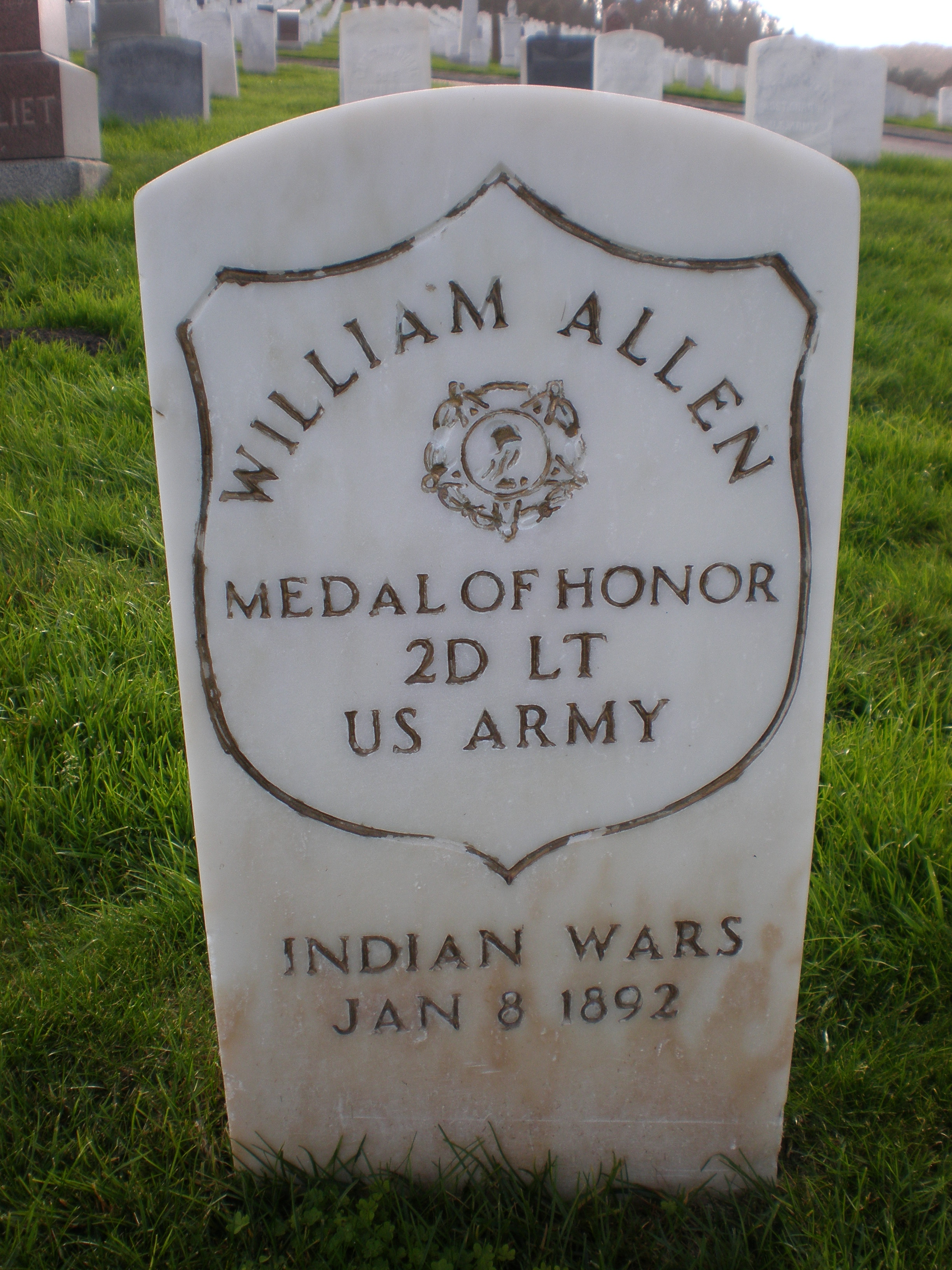
- Allen's headstone at San Francisco National Cemetery
- Born: c. 1845; Brightstown, New York or Philadelphia, Pennsylvania, U.S.
- Died: January 8, 1882 (aged 36–37); Fort Mojave, Arizona Territory, U.S.
- Burial place: San Francisco National Cemetery
- Military career
- Allegiance: United States
- Branch: United States Army
- Service years: 1864–1868, 1870–1882
- Rank: First Lieutenant
- Units: 29th Pennsylvania Volunteers; 23rd U.S. Infantry; 12th U. S. Infantry
- Conflicts: American Civil War; Indian Wars
- Awards: Medal of Honor

William Allen (c. 1845 – January 8, 1882) was a U.S. Army soldier who fought during the Indian Wars in the post-American Civil War period. Serving under Lieutenant Colonel George Crook, he participated in expeditions against the Apache in the Arizona Territory throughout the 1870s. He was one of four men who received the Medal of Honor for the Battle of Turret Peak against the Yavapai Apaches in 1873.

== Biography ==
Born either in Brightstown, New York or Philadelphia, Pennsylvania, Allen enlisted as a private into the 29th Pennsylvania Volunteers on August 15, 1864, and served through Sherman's March to the Sea, until June 7, 1865. In August 1865, he enlisted in the Regular Army at Lansingburgh, New York and was assigned to the 23rd U.S. Infantry. Eventually reaching the rank of first sergeant, he was part of the Lieutenant Colonel George Crook's campaign against the Apache during the early 1870s. On March 27, 1873, he took part in a major engagement against the Yavapai Apaches at Turret Peak, Arizona, only 20 miles south of Camp Verde. He, along with Captain George M. Randall, led a successful surprise attack and was awarded the Medal of Honor for "gallantry in action". He officially received the medal on April 12, 1875, two years after the battle.

In October 1873, Allen was commissioned a Second Lieutenant in the 12th U. S. Infantry, and was promoted to First Lieutenant in December 1880. He died of "inflammation of the bowel" at Fort Mojave, Arizona on January 8, 1882, although his tombstone places the date exactly ten years later in 1892. His remains were eventually buried in the San Francisco National Cemetery.

== See also ==
- List of Medal of Honor recipients for the Indian Wars
