= William R. Parnell =

Irish-born adventurer and soldier (1836–1910)

William Russell Parnell
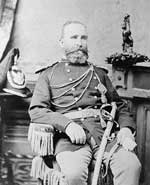
- William R. Parnell
- Born: 13 August 1836; Dublin, Ireland
- Died: 20 August 1910 (aged 74); San Francisco, California, United States
- Burial place: San Francisco National Cemetery
- Military career
- Allegiance: United States of America; Union
- Branch: British Army; United States Army
- Service years: 1854–1855 (British Army); 1861–1864, 1866–1887 (US Army)
- Rank: Lieutenant Colonel; Brevet Colonel
- Unit: 1st U.S. Cavalry
- Conflicts: American Civil War; Indian Wars; Snake War; Bannock Campaign; Modoc War; Nez Perce War; Crimean War
- Awards: Medal of Honor
- Other work: Military instructor at Saint Matthews Episcopal Day School

William Russell Parnell (13 August 1836 – 20 August 1910) was an Irish-born adventurer and soldier during the mid-to late 19th century. A member of the 17th Lancers during the Crimean War, he participated in the Charge of the Light Brigade during the Battle of Balaclava.

He later became a Lieutenant Colonel and brevet Colonel in the U.S. Army, participating in the American Civil War and the Indian Wars. Parnell served as an officer to the 1st U.S. Cavalry in the Nez Perce War and received the Medal of Honor for leading a rescue of troops and personally saving the life of a trooper at the Battle of White Bird Canyon in 1877.

== Biography ==
William Russell Parnell was born in Dublin, Ireland on 13 August 1836. He may have been a distant relative of Irish nationalist Charles Stewart Parnell. At age 18, Parnell enlisted in the British Army serving with the 4th Hussars and, during the Crimean War, with the 17th Lancers. He took part in the now infamous Charge of the Light Brigade during the Battle of Balaclava. He also saw action at the siege and capture of Sevastopol in 1855.

In 1860, Parnell arrived in the United States and joined the U.S. Army in Brooklyn, New York when the American Civil War began the following year. He became a member of the 4th Regiment New York Volunteer Cavalry, popularly known as "Dickel's Mounted Rifles", serving primarily with the Army of the Potomac. During the first two years of the war, he was part of Colonel Louis Blenker's campaigns in the Shenandoah Valley and West Virginia. He also saw action at the battles of Cross Keys, Port Republic, Cedar Mountain, and the Second Battle of Bull Run. With the Cavalry Corps, he also fought at the battles of Fredericksburg, Beverly Ford, Brandy Station, Stoneman's Raid, Aldie, and Middleburg. On 21 June 1863, he was captured after leading a failed cavalry charge at the Battle of Upperville and briefly held as a prisoner-of-war. He escaped two months later and made his way to Petersburg, West Virginia where he was reunited with his regiment. He later saw action at the battles of the Wilderness, Spotsylvania, Trevilian Station, Petersburg, Lee's Mills, Winchester and Cedar Creek among other engagements.

Parnell had been shot in the left hip at Upperville, the bullet embedding itself in the bone, and his doctor decided against removing it. He also sustained a number of saber cuts at the battle, including one that severed his nose. He received no medical attention for it and the bone gradually corroded and fell away "leaving a gaping hole in the roof of his mouth" and making it difficult for him to speak. Parnell had a metal plate made to cover the roof of his mouth allowing him to speak but also raising the pitch of his voice. The plate was very fragile and throughout his life Parnell was fearful he might break it. The plate would break six years later and he had to travel to Portland to have another one made and inserted.

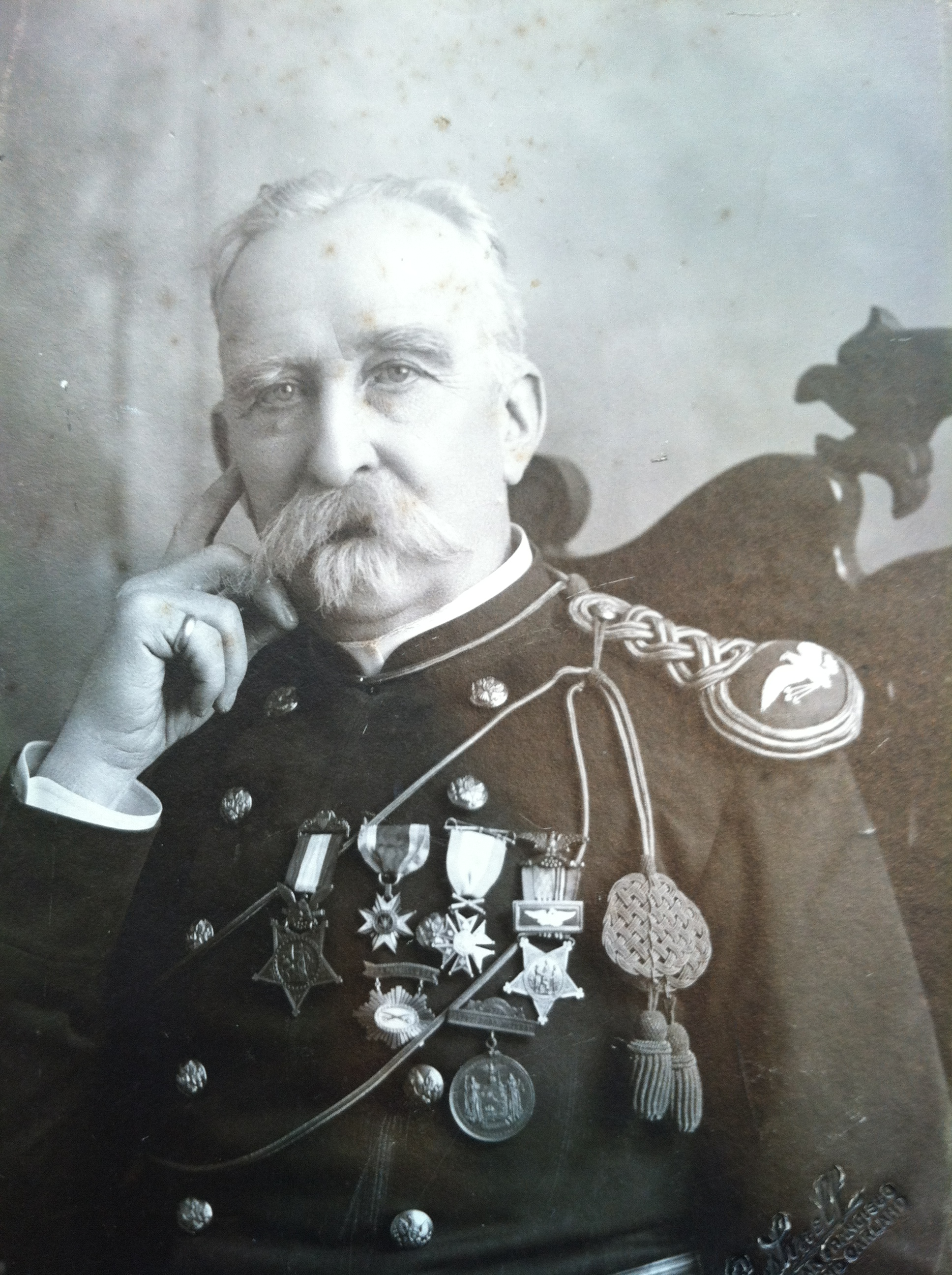
Photograph of Colonel William R. Parnell, Company H, First Cavalry

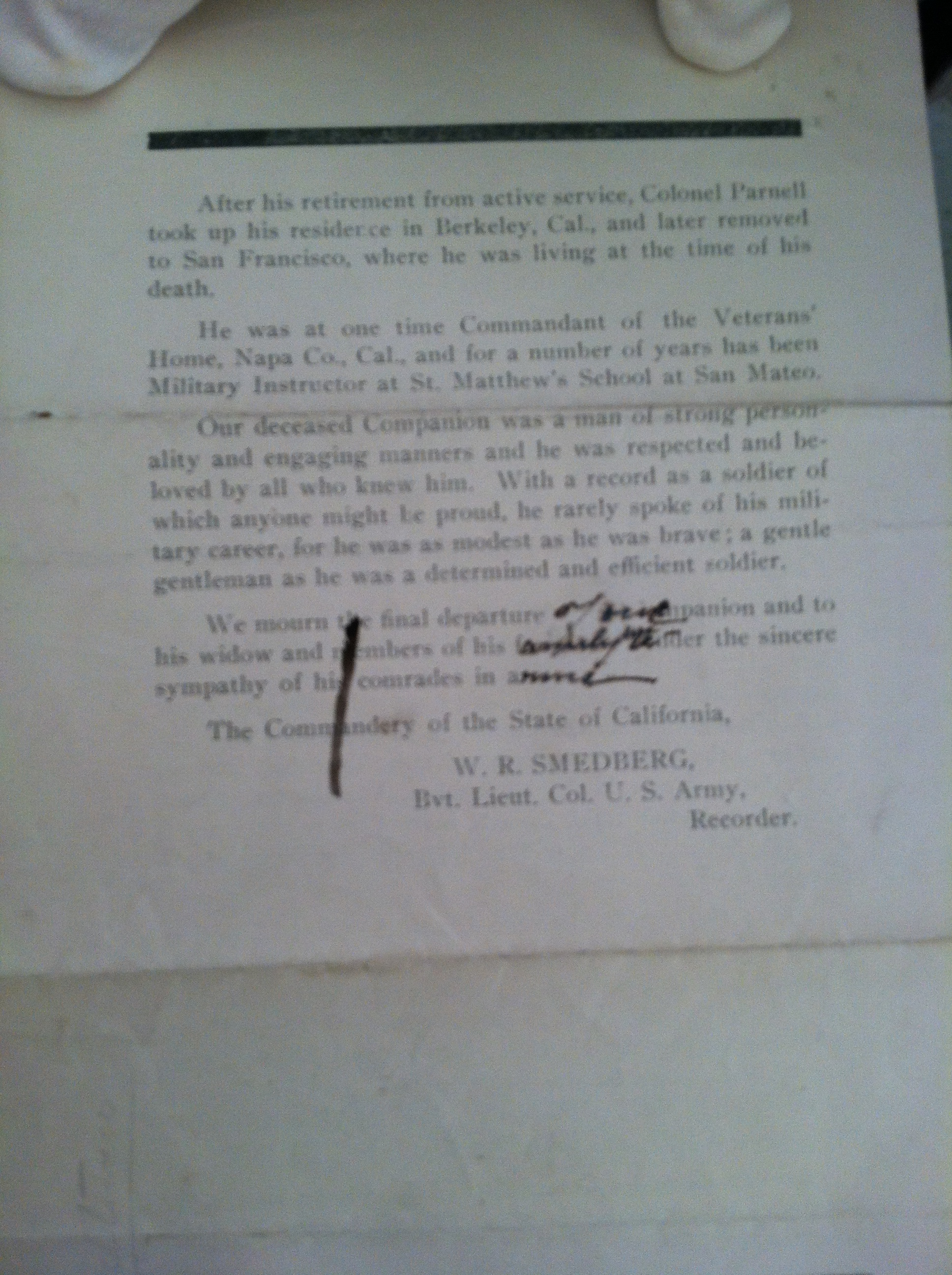
Colonel William R. Parnell, 1836–1910 funeral service—eulogy

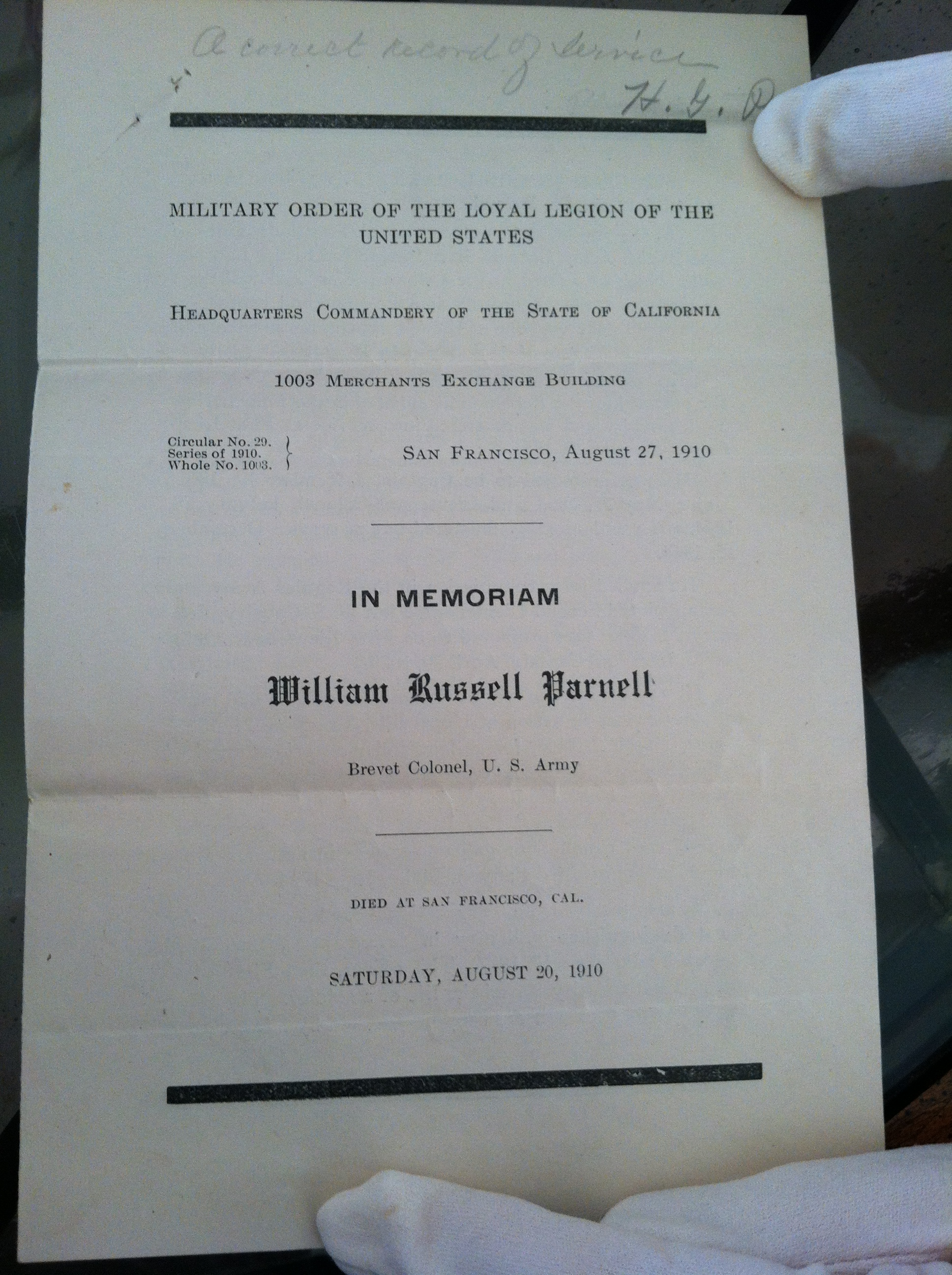
Colonel William R. Parnell, 1836–1910 funeral service - cover

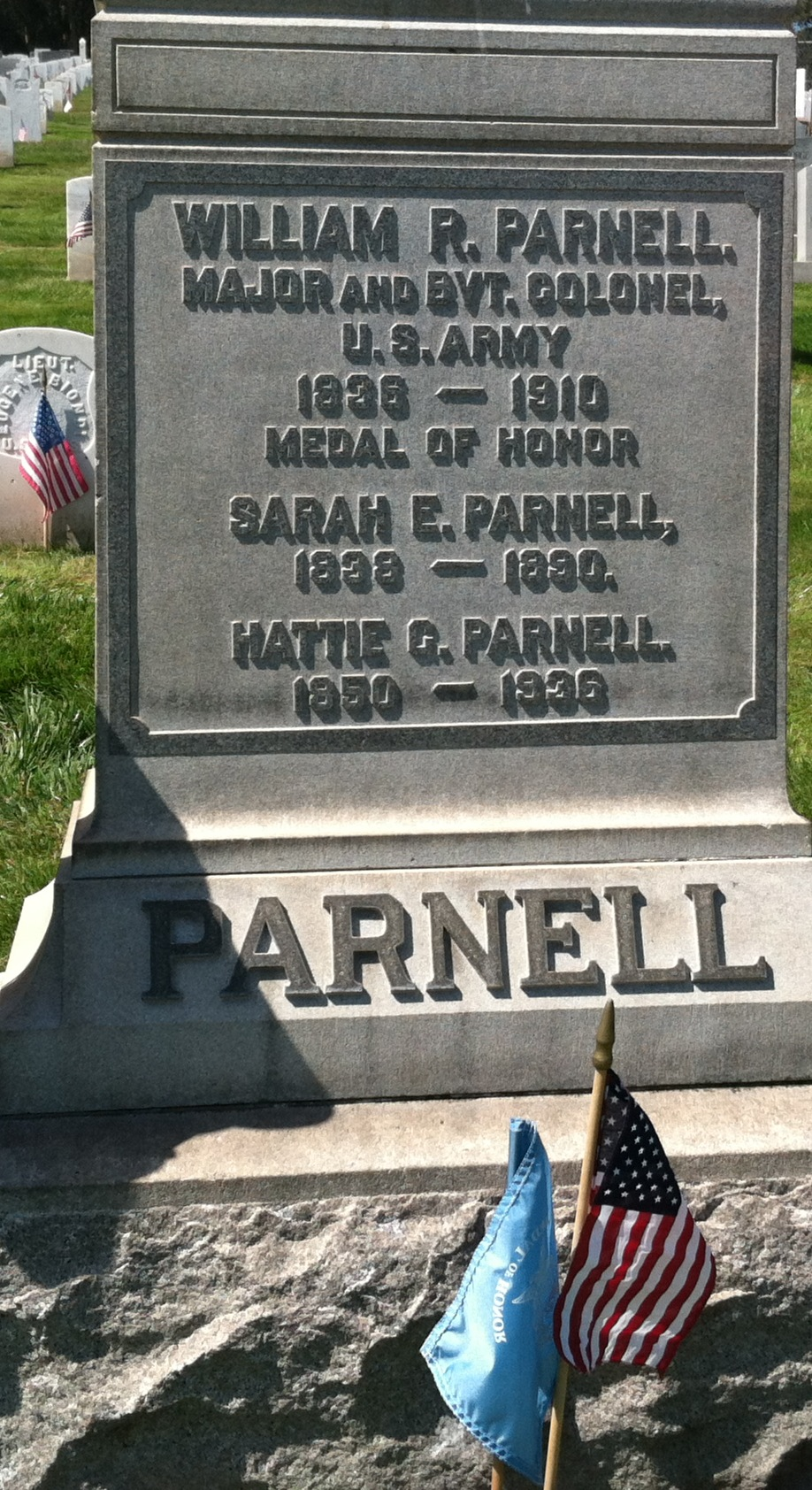
Headstone of Colonel William R. Parnell

Parnell's war record was considered exceptional. He was wounded in battle several times, brevetted twice and had risen to the rank of lieutenant colonel by the end of the war. After being mustered out of volunteer service, he applied to join the Regular Army. On 3 February 1866, Parnell was commissioned a second lieutenant in the 1st U.S. Cavalry and won promotion to first lieutenant within eight months. In the summer of 1867, he and his company were sent to California where he was under the command of Lieutenant Colonel George Crook to take action against hostile Indians active on the Pit River. He was later appointed head of the 1st Cavalry by Crook. At the Battle of Infernal Caverns on 26–28 September 1867, Parnell was wounded by an arrow and brevetted for gallantry. He again served with Crook a year later battling Indians at Dunder and Blitzen Creek in Oregon on 14 March 1868. During 1872–73, Parnell also saw action with Captain David Perry in the Modoc War and in many other campaigns in the Pacific Northwest during the 1870s. He later penned a poem entitled "The Infernal Caverns" which appeared in the Army and Navy Journal on 26 October 1872.

It was in the Nez Perce War in the Idaho Territory that Parnell particularly distinguished himself. On 17 June 1877, at the Battle of White Bird Canyon, Parnell led a small group of soldiers through a heavy fire to rescue Sergeant Michael McCarthy and six other men who had been assigned to defend a critical defensive position. Though two of McCarthy's men were killed, the rest managed to safely join Parnell and continued fighting. During the battle, Parnell turned back to rescue a fallen soldier whose horse had been killed while crossing a marsh. Both Parnell and McCarthy received the Medal of Honor for their efforts.

He also fought at the Battle of the Clearwater on 11–12 July 1877, and, in the Bannock campaign, at Birch Creek on 8 July and the John Day River crossing on 20 July 1878. In February 1879, Parnell was put in command of 10 men, with an interpreter and guide, and given a special orders to go to Okanagau Pass. It was extremely difficult to travel to, especially given the harsh winter conditions, and the party had to pass through British Columbia. At the conclusion of this assignment, he was promoted to the rank of captain on 7 April 1879. He spent the next several years at various frontier outposts in the Pacific Northwest, including duty at the Western Shoshone Indian Reservation in August 1881, and eventually retired from active service on 11 February 1887, due to injuries suffered during his service. He became a major and placed on the retirement list in 1904, and spent the last ten years of his life as a military instructor at Saint Matthews Episcopal Day School in San Mateo, California. He was a companion of the California Commandery of the Military Order of the Loyal Legion of the United States. He died in San Francisco, California on 20 August 1910, after falling from a street car and interred at the San Francisco National Cemetery.

== Medal of Honor citation ==
Rank and organization: First Lieutenant, 1st U.S. Cavalry. Place and date: At White Bird Canyon, Idaho, 17 June 1877. Entered service at: New York. Birth: Ireland. Date of issue: 16 September 1897.

Citation:

With a few men, in the face of a heavy fire from pursuing Indians and at imminent peril, returned and rescued a soldier whose horse had been killed and who had been left behind in the retreat.

== See also ==
- List of Medal of Honor recipients for the Indian Wars
