= Adam Neder =

- Born: 1865; Kingdom of Bavaria
- Died: September 17, 1910 (aged 45); San Francisco, California, United States
- Burial place: San Francisco National Cemetery
- Military career
- Allegiance: United States of America
- Branch: United States Army
- Service years: 1886–1899
- Rank: Sergeant
- Unit: 7th U.S. Cavalry
- Conflicts: Indian Wars; Spanish–American War
- Awards: Medal of Honor

Adam Neder (1865 – September 17, 1910) was a German-born soldier in the U.S. Army who served with the 7th U.S. Cavalry during the Indian Wars. He was one of five men received the Medal of Honor for distinguished bravery, participating in search-and-destroy missions along White Clay Creek, at the Wounded Knee Massacre on December 29, 1890.

== Biography ==
Adam Neder was born in the Kingdom of Bavaria in 1865. He later emigrated to the United States and enlisted in the U.S. Army from St. Louis, Missouri in June 1886. Assigned to frontier duty with the 7th U.S. Cavalry, Neder was a participant in the Wounded Knee Massacre on December 29, 1890. After fighting broke out between cavalrymen and the Sioux, Neder was among the troopers who, as part of a search-and-destroy mission, took part in skirmishes along White Clay Creek. He and four other men — Sergeant Bernhard Jetter, First Sergeant Theodore Ragner, Corporal William O. Wilson and Farrier Richard J. Nolan — received the Medal of Honor for distinguished bravery on April 25, 1891. Seriously wounded during the battle, Neder was also promoted to the rank of corporal for his actions. He was eventually promoted to sergeant, and served in the Spanish–American War until his discharge in 1899. He died in San Francisco, California on September 17, 1910, and was interred in the San Francisco National Cemetery.

== Medal of Honor citation ==
Rank and organization: Private, Company A, 7th U.S. Cavalry. Place and date: Sioux campaign, December 1890. Entered service at:------. Birth: Bavaria. Date of issue: 25 April 1891.

Citation:

Distinguished bravery.

== See also ==
- List of Medal of Honor recipients for the Indian Wars
