= Stalag IX-C =

German prisoner-of-war camp

- Bad Sulza, Thuringia

Site information
- Type: Prisoner-of-war camp
- Controlled by: Nazi Germany

Location
- Bad Sulza, Germany (pre-war borders, 1937)
- Location within Germany
- Coordinates: 51.097867°N 11.632828°E

Site history
- In use: 1940–1945
- Battles/wars: World War II

Garrison information
- Occupants: Polish, Belgian, French, British, Yugoslav,Italian, Canadian, Commonwealth, American prisoners of war

Stalag IX-C was a German prisoner-of-war camp for Allied soldiers in World War II. Although its headquarters were located near Bad Sulza, between Erfurt and Leipzig in Thuringia, its sub-camps – Arbeitskommando – were spread over a wide area, particularly those holding prisoners working in the potassium mines, south of Mühlhausen.

== Camp history ==
The camp was opened in February 1940 to hold Polish soldiers from the German invasion of Poland which started World War II in 1939. In June 1940 many Belgian and French troops taken prisoner during the Battle of France arrived. In late 1940, soldiers from the Argyll and Sutherland Highlanders and Gordon Highlanders, captured at Dunkirk, were marched to the camp. In April 1941 prisoners from Yugoslavia came into camp. In 1943 British and Commonwealth soldiers came from the battles in Italy and North Africa. In September and October 1944 British and Canadian airborne troops, taken prisoner during "Operation Market Garden" at Arnhem, arrived. Finally in late December 1944 Americans arrived that were captured in the Battle of the Bulge. On 29 March 1945 the camp was evacuated and the POWs were forced to march eastwards in advance of the American offensive. For some the march lasted four weeks before being freed by U.S. Army units. Those left in the camp were freed by troops of U.S. 3rd Army.

== Hospitals ==
Also under the administration of Stalag IX-C was a large hospital, Reserve-Lazaret IX-C(a). This was in the town of Obermaßfeld, south-west of Erfurt, in a three-story stone building that was previously a Strength Through Joy hostel. The hospital was operated by British, Canadian and New Zealand medical staff. Its staff was considerably augmented in October 1944 with the arrival of an entire ambulance team of the British 1st Airborne Division, captured at Arnhem. Patients came from across Germany, but mainly from Wehrkreis IX. The hospital was liberated by the U.S. 11th Armored Division.

There was also a smaller hospital Reserve-Lazaret IX-C(b) at Meiningen.

== Escapes ==
In March 1942, two British privates, Macfarlane and Goldie, escaped wearing their blue work detail overalls over their battledress. They wore rucksacks to cover the markings "KG" (Kriegsgefangener, "prisoner of war") on their backs. They secreted themselves in a rail wagon carrying salt to Belgium. There they managed to contact an escape line and, by the middle of the year, they were safely back in Scotland.

== Notable inmates ==
- Ted Brown, American radio personality.
- Pierre-Antoine Cousteau, reporter.
- Cidney B. Fairrington, a pilot and 1st lieutenant in the US Army Air Corps was shot down and captured in November 1944. He was held as a pow until the wars end. He remained on active duty following the war and later served as deputy base commander at Strategic Air Command during the Cuban Missile Crisis. After retiring from active duty he served as executive director of Housing Urban Development in the administration of Richard Nixon.
- Jack Hinton a New Zealand soldier who served during the Second World War. He was awarded the Victoria Cross, the highest award for gallantry "in the face of the enemy" that can be awarded to British and Commonwealth forces, for his actions at Kalamata on 29 April 1941 during the Battle of Greece.
- François Mitterrand, President of France from 1981 to 1995. Mitterrand escaped from the camp in November 1941.
- Captain John B. Sherman, RAMC, Army No. 115959, carried out skin grafts using a razor blade.
- Reba Z. Whittle, an Army Air Corps nurse who was captured in September 1944 when the aircraft she was in was shot down while on a flight to evacuate wounded Allied soldiers, was held briefly at Obermaßfeld and then transferred to Meiningen. She was held as a POW until January 1945 when she was repatriated. Whittle was the only female American POW in the ETO in World War II.

== See also ==
- List of prisoner-of-war camps in Germany
- Stalag
