= Reba Z. Whittle =

United States Army nurse and prisoner of war

Reba Zitella Whittle
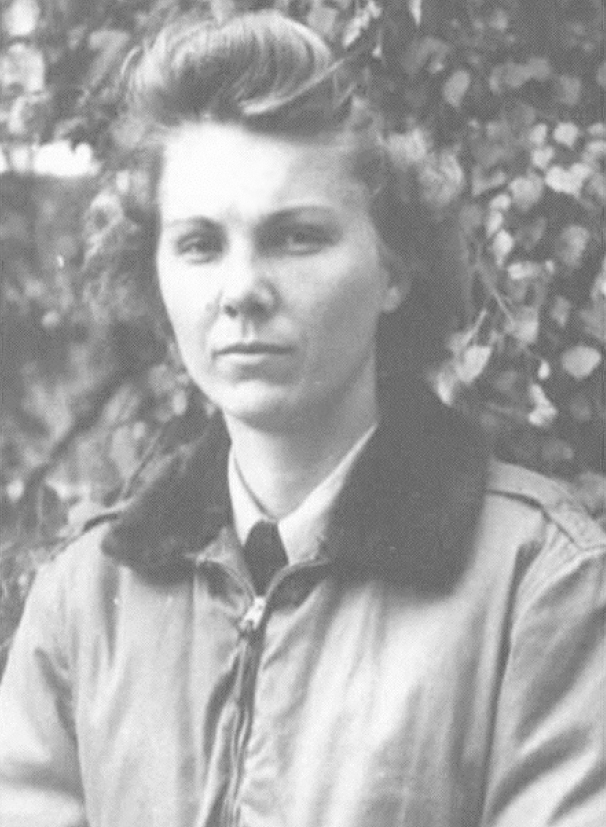
- Whittle during her World War II service, circa 1944
- Born: August 19, 1919; Rocksprings, Texas
- Died: January 26, 1981 (aged 61); Sacramento, California
- Burial place: San Francisco National Cemetery
- Military career
- Allegiance: United States
- Branch: United States Army Nurse Corps
- Service years: 1941 – 1946
- Rank: First Lieutenant
- Service number: N734426
- Unit: 813th Medical Air Evacuation Transport Squadron
- Conflicts: World War II
- Awards: Air Medal; Purple Heart; Prisoner of War Medal

First Lieutenant Reba Zitella Whittle (August 19, 1919 – January 26, 1981) was a member of the United States Army Nurse Corps during World War II. She became the only American military female prisoner of war in the European Theater after her casualty evacuation aircraft was shot down in September 1944.

== Biography ==
=== Background and military service ===
Whittle was born in Rocksprings, Edwards County, Texas, and studied at North Texas State College, before attending the Medical and Surgical Memorial Hospital School of Nursing in San Antonio. After graduating Whittle commissioned in the Army Nurse Corps on 10 June 1941 at Fort Sam Houston. With the rank of second lieutenant, she was assigned the Station Hospital at Albuquerque Army Air Base, New Mexico, where she served as a general duty ward nurse, later being transferred to Mather Field, Sacramento, California.

On August 6, 1943, Whittle was accepted by the Army Air Forces School of Air Evacuation to train as a flight nurse. She arrived at the school at Bowman Field, Kentucky, in September. The six-week course was designed to make the nurses largely self-sufficient during the flight, and they were trained to treat pain, bleeding and shock, attending to patients in the absence of a physician. Whittle graduated with excellent grades on November 26, 1943, and on January 22, 1944, she departed for England aboard the RMS Queen Mary with 25 other flight nurses of the 813th Medical Air Evacuation Transport Squadron. The 813th MAETS was initially based in RAF Balderton, Nottinghamshire, and later at RAF Grove, Oxfordshire. Between January and September 1944 Whittle flew on 40 missions logging over 500 hours flight time.

=== Prisoner of war ===
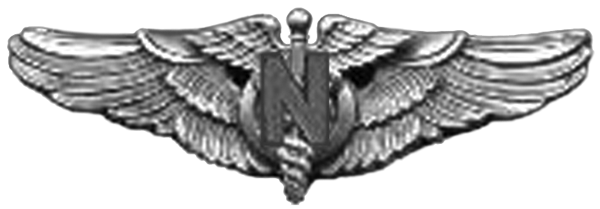
World War II U.S. Army Air Forces flight nurse badge

On September 27, 1944, Whittle left England on a mission to collect casualties from Advanced Landing Ground A-92 at St. Trond, Belgium. However, her C-47 was hit by German flak and crashed about 4 km (2.5 mi) outside Aachen, having apparently strayed far from its intended route, as Aachen and St. Trond are 70 km (43 mi) apart. The aircraft usually carried military supplies and sometimes troops on the outward flight, and then casualties on the return, so were not marked with the red cross. In the crash, Sergeant Hill, her surgical technician, was wounded in the arm and leg, one of the pilots was killed, the other badly hurt, and Whittle herself suffered from concussion, and injuries and lacerations to her face and back. The crew crawled from the wrecked and burning aircraft and were captured by German soldiers. They were taken to a nearby village and treated for their immediate injuries, then driven to a hospital nearby where a German doctor told Whittle that it was "Too bad having a woman as you are the first one and no one knows exactly what to do."

The crew was then taken to Auswertestelle West ("Evaluation Office West"), the main Luftwaffe interrogation center at Oberursel, just to the north of Frankfurt. Whittle was separated from the rest of her crew and lodged at the nearby Hohemark Hospital, part of Auswertestelle West designed to provide immediate aid for wounded prisoners.

On October 6, she was transferred to Reserve Lazarett IX-C(a) at Obermaßfeld. This was a military hospital run by British medical staff for Allied POWs, part of Stalag IX-C. On October 19, she was moved to another POW hospital, IX-C(b), at nearby Meiningen, where she worked with burn patients and at the rehabilitation center for amputees. After several weeks she was seen by representatives of the International Committee of the Red Cross, who notified the State Department, and began to negotiate her release. Whittle was eventually repatriated, leaving Stalag IX-C on January 25, 1945. She was transported by train to Switzerland along with other prisoners who were being returned on medical or psychiatric grounds, then flew back to the United States.

=== Return to the U.S. ===
On February 7, 1945, Whittle received the Purple Heart for the injuries she received during the crash, and on the 17th was awarded the Air Medal, "For meritorious achievement while participating in aerial flights...in unarmed and unarmored aircraft." On March 2, she was promoted to first lieutenant.

After a medical assessment and treatment at the Walter Reed Hospital, Washington, D.C., and Brooke General Hospital, San Antonio, she was given 21 days convalescent leave. On May 11 she returned to duty, and a week later was sent to the Army Air Forces Redistribution Station No.2, at Miami Beach, Florida, where after another medical assessment her flying status was suspended on the grounds of recurrent headaches. Whittle served as a ward nurse at the AAF Regional and Air Debarkation Hospital, Hamilton Field, California, from June 15, 1945. On August 3, 1945 she married Lieutenant Colonel Stanley W. Tobiason at Hamilton Field, and then applied to be released from active duty. On August 31, 1945, she appeared before a Disposition Board which determined her to be fully qualified for military service. Her orders stated, "Relief from Active Duty is not by reason of physical disability." She was discharged on January 13, 1946.

=== Post-war life ===
Whittle continued to suffer from an assortment of physical and psychiatric problems. She sought compensation from the Veterans Administration, and in 1950 began a series of appeals for military medical retirement. Despite diagnoses of post-traumatic encephalopathy, chronic severe anxiety reaction, and early lumbosacral arthritis, her appeals were denied. Finally, in January 1954 the Army Physical Disability Appeal Board agreed that she was relieved from active duty by reason of physical disability, and thus eligible for retirement pay benefits, but as her disability was not "combat incurred", it was backdated only to the time of her application, April 1952. Her retroactive pay amounted to $3,780. After another review of her case an additional $999 was added. Had she received retroactive pay from the date of her discharge in 1946 it would have totaled $13,760. In 1960 she appealed for the full amount of retroactive pay, but this was rejected. Whittle made no further attempts to pursue her case. She and Colonel Tobiason had two sons, one of whom became a Naval Aviator and served in Vietnam. Reba Whittle Tobiason died of cancer on January 26, 1981.

In April 1983, Colonel Tobiason wrote to the Department of the Army following the announcement of the honoring of the Army and Navy nurses captured and imprisoned by the Japanese, which stated that the Department of Defense and the Veterans Administration knew of no other American military women to have been taken prisoner. On September 2, 1983, Reba Z. Whittle was finally given official prisoner of war status. In 1997, she was posthumously awarded the Prisoner of War Medal.

== See also ==
- Women's roles in the World Wars
