= San Francisco National Cemetery =

Historic veterans cemetery

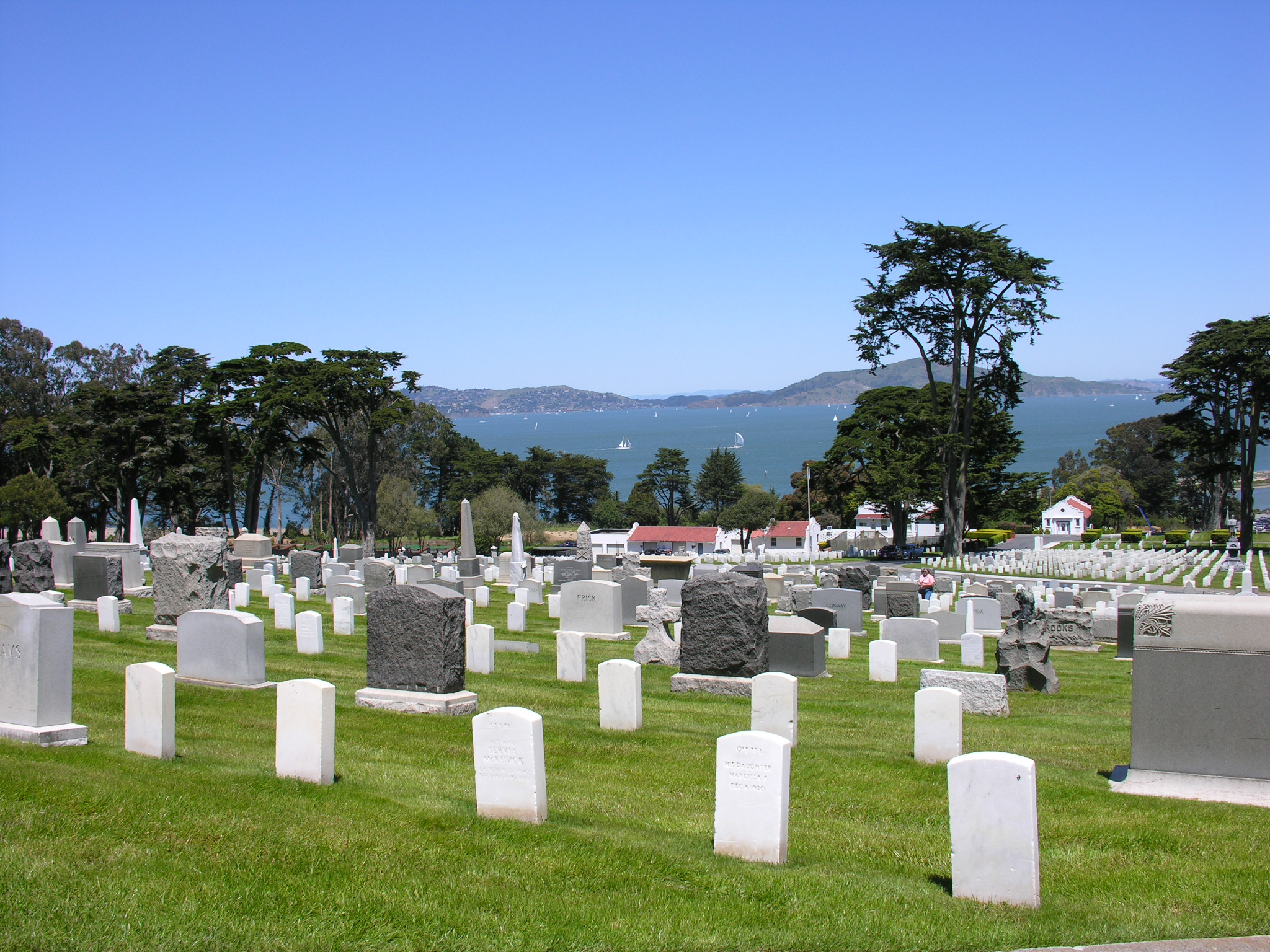
- San Francisco National Cemetery looking north towards the Golden Gate Bridge.
- Interactive map of San Francisco National Cemetery

Details
- Established: 1884
- Location: San Francisco, California
- Country: United States
- Coordinates: 37°47′59″N 122°27′52″W
- Type: U.S. National Cemetery
- Size: 9 acres (3.6 ha)
- No. of interments: >32,000
- Website: US Department of Veterans Affairs

San Francisco National Cemetery is a United States national cemetery, located in the Presidio of San Francisco, California. Because of the name and location, it is frequently confused with Golden Gate National Cemetery, a few miles south of the city.

Around 1937, San Francisco residents voted to no longer build cemeteries within the city proper and, as a result, the site for a new national cemetery was selected south of the city limits. The cemetery is one of only four officially existing within San Francisco city limits (the others being the Columbarium of San Francisco, the historic graveyard next to Mission Dolores, and the sarcophagus of Thomas Starr King).

== History ==
When Spain colonized what would become California, this area was selected as the site for a fort, or presidio, to defend San Francisco Bay. About 40 families traveled here from northern Mexico in 1776 and built the first settlement, a small quadrangle, only a few hundred feet west of what is now Funston Avenue. Mexico controlled the Presidio following 1821, but the fort became less important to the Mexican government. In 1835, most soldiers and their families moved north to Sonoma, leaving it nearly abandoned. During the Mexican–American War, U.S. troops occupied and repaired the damage to the fort.

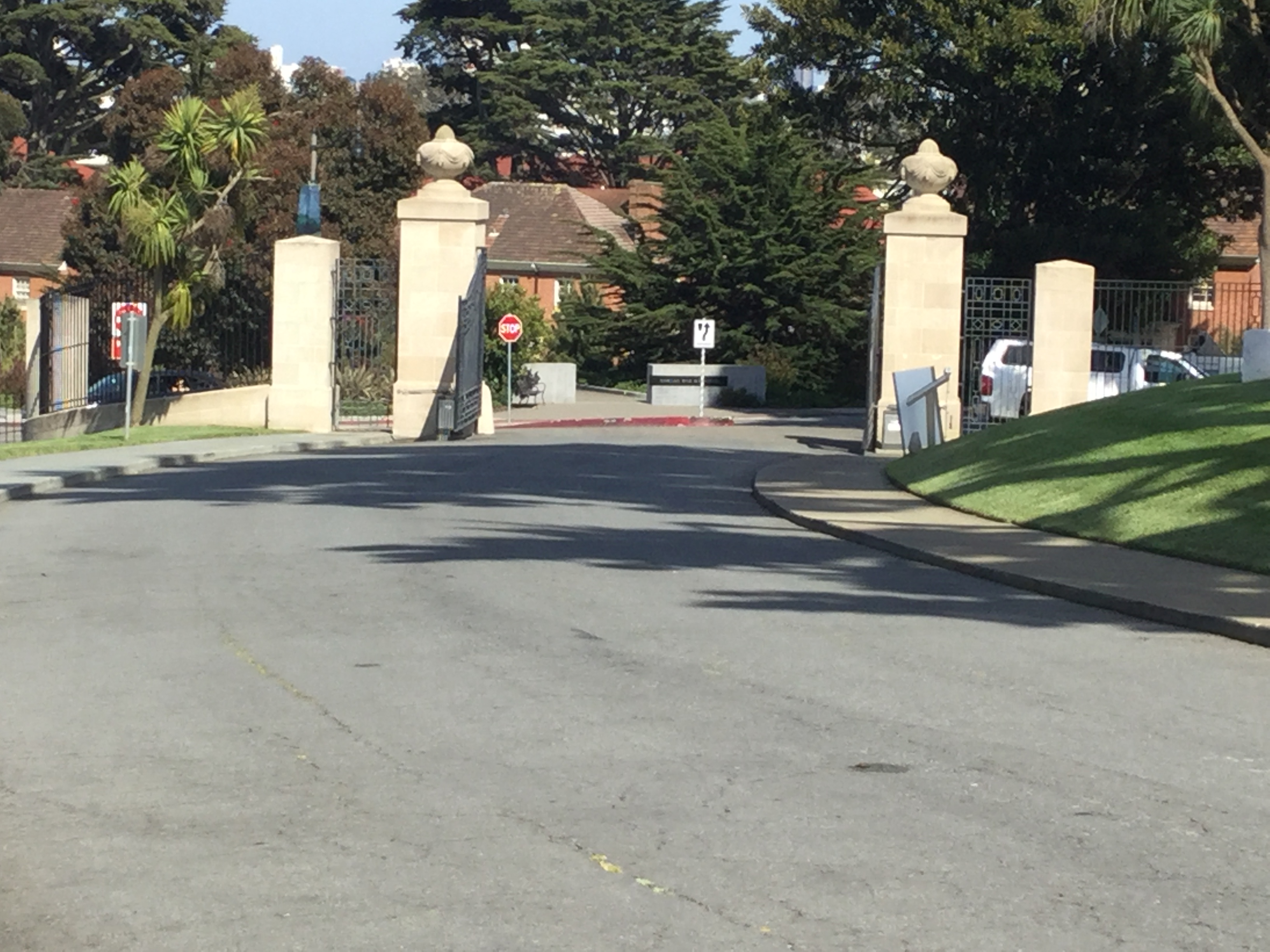
The entrance of San Francisco National Cemetery

The mid-century discovery of gold in California led to the sudden growth and importance of San Francisco, and prompted the U.S. government to establish a military reservation here. By executive order, President Millard Fillmore established the Presidio for military use in November 1850. During the 1850s and 1860s, Presidio-based soldiers fought Native Americans in California, Oregon, Washington, and Nevada. The outbreak of the American Civil War in 1861 re-emphasized the importance of California's riches and the military significance of San Francisco's harbor to the Union. This led, in 1862, to the first major construction and expansion program at the Presidio since its acquisition by the United States.

The Indian Wars of the 1870s and 1880s resulted in additional expansion of the Presidio, including large-scale tree planting and a post beautification program. By the following decade the Presidio had shed its frontier outpost appearance and was elevated to a major military installation and base for American expansion into the Pacific.

In 1890, with the creation of Sequoia, General Grant and Yosemite National Parks in the Sierra Nevada mountains of California, the protection of these scenic and natural resources was assigned to the U.S. cavalry stationed at the Presidio. Soldiers patrolled these parks during summer months until the start of World War I in 1914. The Spanish–American War in 1898 and subsequent Philippine–American War, from 1899 to 1902, increased the role of the Presidio. Thousands of troops camped in tent cities while awaiting shipment to the Philippines. Returning sick and wounded soldiers were treated in the Army's first permanent hospital, later renamed Letterman Army General Hospital. In 1914, troops under the command of General John Pershing departed the Presidio for the Mexican border in pursuit of Pancho Villa and his men.

When the United States entered World War II after the Japanese attack on Pearl Harbor, Presidio soldiers dug foxholes along nearby beaches. Fourth Army Commander Gen. John L. DeWitt conducted the internment of thousands of Japanese and Japanese-Americans on the West Coast while U.S. soldiers of Japanese descent were trained to read and speak Japanese at the first Military Intelligence Service language school organized at Crissy Field. During the 1950s, the Presidio served as the headquarters for the Nike missile defense program and headquarters for the U.S. Sixth Army. The Presidio of San Francisco, encompassing more than 350 buildings with historic value, was designated a National Historic Landmark in 1962. In 1989, the Presidio closed as a military entity and was transferred to the National Park Service in October 1994.

On December 12, 1884, the War Department designated 9 acres (3.6 ha), including the site of the old post cemetery, as San Francisco National Cemetery. It was the first national cemetery established on the West Coast and marks the growth and development of a system of national cemeteries extending beyond the battlefields of the Civil War. Initial interments included the remains of the dead from the former post cemetery as well as individuals removed from cemeteries at abandoned forts and camps elsewhere along the Pacific coast and western frontier. In 1934, all unknown remains in the cemetery were disinterred and reinterred in one plot. Many soldiers and sailors who died overseas serving in the Philippines, China and other areas of the Pacific Theater are interred in San Francisco National Cemetery.

There are also three British Commonwealth service war graves here, a Canadian soldier of World War I, and a Royal Navy and Merchant Navy sailor of World War II.

The cemetery is enclosed with a stone wall and slopes down a hill that today frames a view of the Golden Gate Bridge. Its original ornamental cast-iron entrance gates are present but have been unused since the entrance was relocated. Tall eucalyptus trees further enclose the cemetery. The lodge and rostrum date to the 1920s and reflect the Spanish Revival styling introduced to several western cemeteries.

== Monuments and memorials ==
- A Grand Army of the Republic Memorial (1893)
- The Pacific Garrison Memorial (1897)
- Regular Army and Navy Union statue (1897)
- A monument to the Marines who died at the Tartar Wall in Beijing, China (1900)
- A monument to the Unknown Dead (installed 1912 and relocated 1934)

== Notable burials ==
=== Medal of Honor recipients ===
(Dates are of the actions for which they were awarded the Medal of Honor.)

- First Sergeant William Allen (Indian Campaigns), Company I, 23rd U.S. Infantry. Turret Mountain, Arizona, March 27, 1873
- Chief Machinist's Mate William Badders U.S. Navy. At sea following sinking of the USS Squalus, May 13, 1939
- Major James Coey (Civil War), 147th New York Infantry. Hatchers Run, Va., February 6, 1865
- Sergeant James Congdon (served under the name James Madison) (Civil War), Company E, 8th New York Cavalry. Waynesboro, Va., March 2, 1865
- Second Lieutenant Matthias W. Day (Indian Campaigns), 9th U.S. Cavalry. Las Animas Canyon, N.M., September 18, 1879
- Major General William F. Dean (Korean War), U.S. Army, commanding general, 24th Infantry Division. Taejon, Korea, July 20–21, 1950
- Captain Reginald B. Desiderio (Korean War), U.S. Army, commanding officer, Company E, 27th Infantry Regiment, 25th Infantry Division. Near Ipsok, Korea, November 27, 1950
- Lieutenant Abraham DeSomer (Mexican Campaign), U.S. Navy, USS Utah. Veracruz, Mexico, April 21–22, 1914
- Colonel Kern W. Dunagan (Vietnam War), U.S. Army, Company A, 1st Battalion, 46th Infantry, Americal Division. Republic of Vietnam, May 13, 1969
- Sergeant William Foster (Indian Campaigns), Company F, 4th U.S. Cavalry. Red River, Tex., September 29, 1872
- Colonel Frederick Funston, Sr., (Philippine–American War), 20th Kansas Volunteer Infantry. Rio Grande de la Pampanga, Luzon, Philippine Islands, April 27, 1899
- Seaman Rade Grbitch U.S. Navy. On board the USS Bennington, July 21, 1905
- Major Oliver D. Greene (Civil War), U.S. Army. Antietam, Md., September 17, 1862
- First Lieutenant John Chowning Gresham (Indian Campaigns), 7th U.S. Cavalry. Wounded Knee, S.D., December 29, 1890
- Chief Carpenter's Mate Franz Anton Itrich (Spanish–American War), U.S. Navy. On board USS Petrel, May 1, 1898
- Staff Sergeant Robert S. Kennemore (Korean War), U.S. Marine Corps, Company E, 2nd Battalion, 7th Marines, 1st Marine Division. North of Yudam-ni, Korea, November 27–28, 1950
- Sergeant John Sterling Lawton (Indian Campaigns), Company D, 5th U.S. Cavalry. Milk River, Colo., September 29, 1879
- Private Cornelius J. Leahy (Philippine–American War), Company A, 36th Infantry, U.S. Volunteers. Near Porac, Luzon, Philippine Islands, September 3, 1899
- First Sergeant John Mitchell (Indian Campaigns), Company I, 5th U.S. Infantry. Upper Washita, Tex., September 9–11, 1874
- Private Albert Moore (Boxer Rebellion), U.S. Marine Corps. Peking, China, July 21 – August 17, 1900
- Second Lieutenant Louis Clinton Mosher (Philippine–American War), Philippine Scouts. Gagsak Mountain, Jolo, Philippine Islands, June 11, 1913
- Private Adam Neder (Indian Campaigns), Company A, 7th U.S. Cavalry. Sioux Campaign, December 1890
- First Lieutenant William R. Parnell (Indian Campaigns), 1st U.S. Cavalry. White Bird Canyon, Idaho, June 17, 1877
- Corporal Reuben Jasper Phillips (Boxer Rebellion), U.S. Marine Corps. China, June 1900
- Corporal Norman W. Ressler (Spanish–American War), Company D, 17th U.S. Infantry. El Caney, Cuba, July 1, 1898
- Sergeant Lloyd Martin Seibert (World War I), U.S. Army, Company F, 364th Infantry, 91st Division. Near Epinonville, France, September 26, 1918
- First Lieutenant William Rufus Shafter (Civil War), Company I, 7th Michigan Infantry. Fair Oaks, Va., May 31, 1862
- Private George Matthew Shelton, Sr., (Philippine–American War), Company I, 23rd U.S. Infantry. La Paz, Leyte, Philippine Islands, April 26, 1900
- Gunner's Mate Second Class Andrew V. Stoltenberg (Philippine–American War), U.S. Navy. Catbalogan, Samar, Philippine Islands, July 16, 1900
- Sergeant Bernard Taylor (Indian Campaigns), Company A, 5th U.S. Cavalry. Near Sunset Pass, Ariz., November 1, 1874
- Private William H. Thompkins (Spanish–American War), Troop G, 10th U.S. Cavalry. Battle of Tayacoba, Cuba, June 30, 1898
- Captain Charles A. Varnum (Indian Campaigns), Company B, 7th U.S. Cavalry. White Clay Creek, S.D., December 30, 1890
- Second Lieutenant George W. Wallace (Philippine–American War), 9th U.S. Infantry. Tinuba, Luzon, Philippine Islands, March 4, 1900
- Seaman Axel Westermark (Boxer Rebellion), U.S. Navy. Peking, China June 28 – August 17, 1900
- Sergeant William Wilson (Indian Campaigns), Company I, 4th U.S. Cavalry. Colorado Valley, Texas, March 28, 1872

=== Other burials ===
Video of the cemetery from the Golden Gate Club

- First Lieutenant Reba Z. Whittle, The only female American World War II prisoner of war in the European Theater.

Two unusual interments at San Francisco National Cemetery are "Major" Pauline Cushman and Sarah A. Bowman. Cushman's headstone bears the inscription "Pauline C. Fryer, Union Spy", but her real name was Harriet Wood. Born in the 1830s, she became a performer in Thomas Placide's show Varieties and took the name Pauline Cushman. She married theater musician Charles Dickinson in 1853, but after her husband died of illness related to his service for Union forces, she returned to the stage. During spring 1863, while performing in Louisville, Kentucky, she was asked by the provost marshal to gather information regarding local Confederate activity. From there she was sent to Nashville, where she had some success conveying information about troop strength and movements. In Nashville, she was also captured and nearly hanged as a spy. She returned to the stage in 1864, to lecture and sell her autobiography. Entertainer P.T. Barnum promoted her as the "Spy of the Cumberland" and through Barnum's practiced boostership she quickly gained fleeting fame. After spending the 1870s working the redwood logging camps, she remarried and moved to the Arizona Territory. By 1893 she was divorced, destitute and desperate; she applied for her first husband's military pension and returned to San Francisco, where she died from an overdose of narcotics allegedly taken to soothe her rheumatism. Members of the Grand Army of the Republic and Women's Relief Corps conducted a magnificent funeral for the former spy. "Major" Cushman's remains reside in Officer's Circle.

Also buried at San Francisco National Cemetery is Sarah Bowman, also known as "Great Western", a formidable woman over 6 feet (1.8 m) tall with red hair and a fondness for wearing pistols. Married to a soldier, she traveled with Zachary Taylor's troops in the Mexican–American War helping to care for the wounded, for which she earned a government pension. After her husband's death she had a variety of male companions and ran an infamous tavern and brothel in El Paso, Texas. Bowman left El Paso when she married her last husband. The two ended up at Fort Yuma, where she operated a boarding house until her death from a spider bite in 1866. She was given a full military funeral and was buried in the Fort Yuma Cemetery. Several years later her body was exhumed and reburied at San Francisco National Cemetery.

San Francisco National Cemetery is also the burial location of Brigadier General George G. Gatley, who commanded brigades and divisions in World War I, and was also well known as the father of actress Ann Harding. Another World War I brigadier general, Odus Creamer Horney, is also buried at San Francisco National Cemetery. John Francis Dillon, member of the U.S. Federal Radio Commission is buried there too. Richard Comba, an Irish immigrant who enlisted in the army in 1855 when he was 17 and retired as a brigadier general, is buried here.

U.S. representatives Phillip Burton and Sala Burton are also buried in the cemetery. Another famous burial includes Felix Wierzbicki, the author of the first English-language book printed in California: California as It Is and as It May Be, or A Guide to the Gold Region.

Senator Edward D. Baker of Oregon who was killed during the American Civil War at the Battle of Ball's Bluff.
