= Cornelius J. Leahy =

- Born: June 1872; Ireland
- Died: November 30 or December 1 1900 (aged 27–28); Philippine Islands
- Burial place: San Francisco National Cemetery San Francisco, California
- Military career
- Allegiance: United States of America
- Branch: United States Army
- Service years: 1898 - 1900
- Rank: Private
- Units: Company A, 36th Infantry, U.S. Volunteers
- Conflicts: Philippine–American War
- Awards: Medal of Honor

Cornelius J. Leahy (June 1872 – November 30 or December 1, 1900) was a private in the United States Army who received the Medal of Honor for actions during the Philippine–American War.

He died on November 30 or December 1, 1900, in Pilar, Bataan in the Philippines.

He is buried in San Francisco National Cemetery, San Francisco, California.

== Medal of Honor citation ==
Rank and organization: Private, Company A, 36th Infantry, U.S. Volunteers. Place and date: Near Porac, Luzon, Philippine Islands, September 3, 1899. Entered service at: San Francisco, Calif. Birth: Ireland. Date of issue: May 3, 1902.

Citation:

For most distinguished gallantry in action in defending and driving off a superior force of insurgents, and, with the assistance of one comrade, bringing from the field of action the bodies of two comrades, one killed and the other severely wounded. This while on a scout near Porac, Luzon, P. I., September 3, 1899.

== See also ==
- List of Medal of Honor recipients
- List of Philippine–American War Medal of Honor recipients
