= Freedom Train (1947–1949) =

United States train tour

This article contains a list of station stops made by the first Freedom Train on its 48-state tour.

== 1947 ==
=== September 1947 ===
- September 17–September 19 – Philadelphia, Pennsylvania
- September 20 – Atlantic City, New Jersey
- September 21 – Trenton, New Jersey
- September 22 – Elizabeth, New Jersey
- September 23 – Paterson, New Jersey
- September 24–September 26 – New York, New York
- September 27 – Brooklyn, New York
- September 28 – Jamaica, Queens, New York (Long Island)
- September 30 – Van Nest, Bronx, New York (The Bronx)

=== October 1947 ===
- October 1 – Stamford, Connecticut
- October 2 – Bridgeport, Connecticut
- October 3 – Waterbury, Connecticut
- October 4 – Hartford, Connecticut
- October 5 – New Haven, Connecticut
- October 7 – New London, Connecticut
- October 8 – Providence, Rhode Island
- October 9 – Worcester, Massachusetts
- October 10 – Lynn, Massachusetts
- October 11 – Boston, Massachusetts (North Station)
- October 12 – Boston, Massachusetts (South Station)
- October 13 – Rutland, Vermont
- October 15 – Burlington, Vermont
- October 16 – Montpelier, Vermont
- October 18 – Nashua, New Hampshire
- October 19 – Lowell, Massachusetts
- October 20 – Lawrence, Massachusetts
- October 22 – Haverhill, Massachusetts
- October 23 – Dover, New Hampshire
- October 24 – Augusta, Maine
- October 25 – Bangor, Maine
- October 26 – Lewiston, Maine
- October 27 – Manchester, New Hampshire
- October 28 – Fitchburg, Massachusetts
- October 30 – Springfield, Massachusetts
- October 31 – Pittsfield, Massachusetts

=== November 1947 ===
- November 1 – Schenectady, New York
- November 2 – Utica, New York
- November 4 – Rome, New York
- November 5 – Syracuse, New York
- November 6 – Rochester, New York
- November 7 – Buffalo, New York
- November 8 – Elmira, New York
- November 9 – Binghamton, New York
- November 11 – Albany, New York
- November 12 – Scranton, Pennsylvania
- November 13 – Wilkes-Barre, Pennsylvania
- November 14 – Williamsport, Pennsylvania
- November 15 – Altoona, Pennsylvania
- November 16 – Harrisburg, Pennsylvania
- November 18 – Reading, Pennsylvania
- November 19 – Allentown, Pennsylvania
- November 20 – Chester, Pennsylvania
- November 21 – Wilmington, Delaware
- November 22 – Salisbury, Maryland
- November 23 – Dover, Delaware
- November 25–November 26 – Baltimore, Maryland
- November 27–November 28 – Washington, D.C.
- November 29 – Charlottesville, Virginia
- November 30 – Lynchburg, Virginia

=== December 1947 ===
- December 2 – Roanoke, Virginia
- December 3 – Winston-Salem, North Carolina
- December 4 – Charlotte, North Carolina
- December 5 – Greensboro, North Carolina
- December 6 – Raleigh, North Carolina
- December 7 – Norfolk, Virginia
- December 9 – Richmond, Virginia
- December 10 – Wilmington, North Carolina
- December 11 – Columbia, South Carolina
- December 12 – Spartanburg, South Carolina
- December 13 – Greenville, South Carolina
- December 14 – Augusta, Georgia
- December 16 – Charleston, South Carolina
- December 17 – Savannah, Georgia
- December 18 – Brunswick, Georgia
- December 19 – Jacksonville, Florida
- December 20 – Miami, Florida
- December 21 – Tampa, Florida
- December 22 – Tallahassee, Florida
- December 23 – Pensacola, Florida
- December 26 – Mobile, Alabama
- December 27 – Montgomery, Alabama
- December 28 – Tuscaloosa, Alabama
- December 29 – Columbus, Georgia
- December 31 – Macon, Georgia

== 1948 ==
=== January 1948 ===
- January 1–January 2 – Atlanta, Georgia
- January 3 – Chattanooga, Tennessee
- January 4 – Nashville, Tennessee
- January 6 – Jackson, Tennessee
- January 7–January 8 – New Orleans, Louisiana
- January 9 – Hattiesburg, Mississippi
- January 10 – Meridian, Mississippi
- January 11 – Jackson, Mississippi
- January 13 – Vicksburg, Mississippi
- January 14 – Monroe, Louisiana
- January 15 – Alexandria, Louisiana
- January 16 – Baton Rouge, Louisiana
- January 17 – Shreveport, Louisiana
- January 18 – Texarkana, Arkansas/Texarkana, Texas
- January 19 – Little Rock, Arkansas
- January 21 – Pine Bluff, Arkansas
- January 22 – Fort Smith, Arkansas
- January 23 – Muskogee, Oklahoma
- January 24 – Tulsa, Oklahoma
- January 25 – Oklahoma City, Oklahoma
- January 27 – Enid, Oklahoma
- January 28 – Ada, Oklahoma
- January 29 – Denison, Texas
- January 30–January 31 – Dallas, Texas

=== February 1948 ===
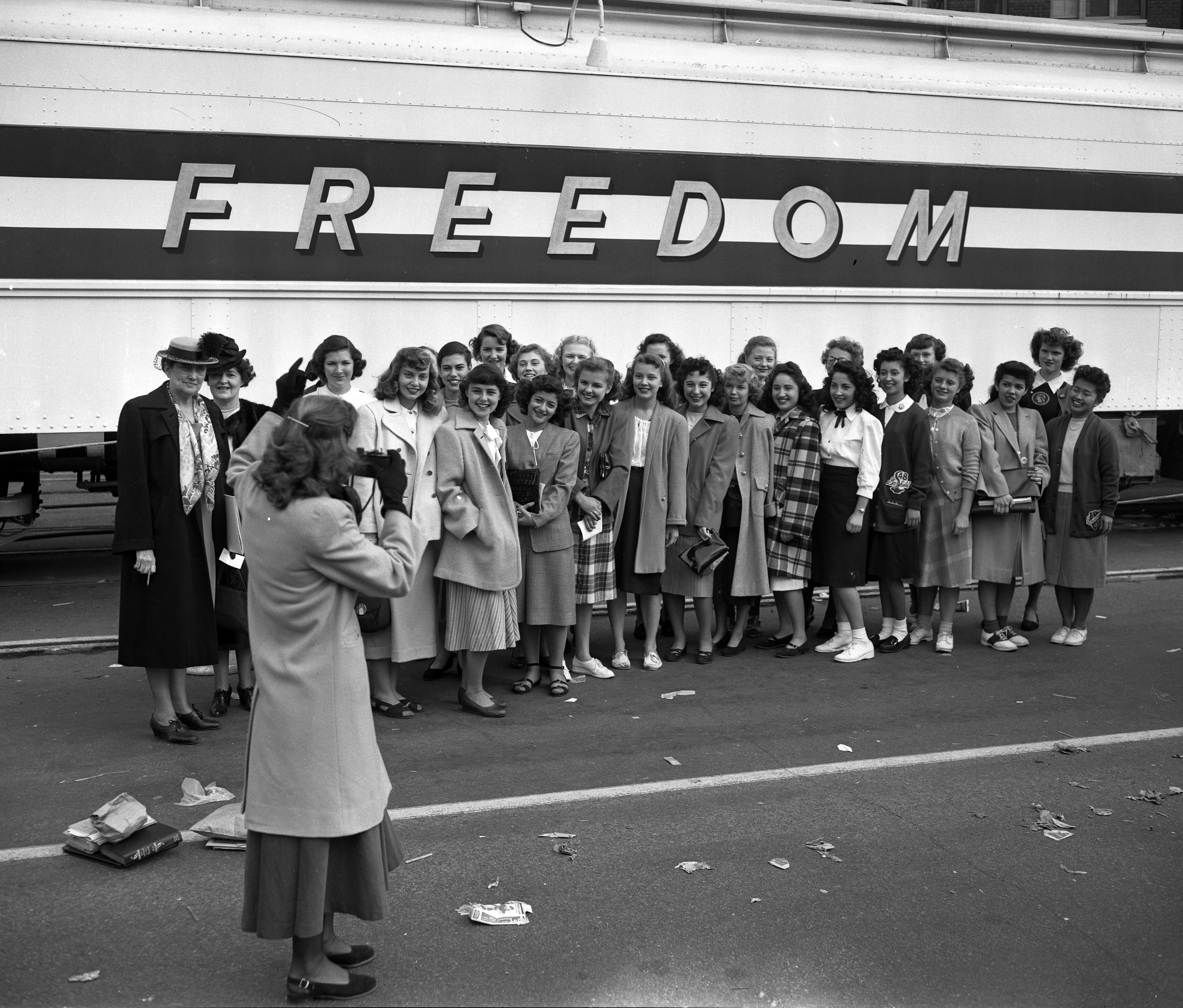
Susan B. Anthony Club members, Freedom Train, Los Angeles 1948

- February 1 – Fort Worth, Texas
- February 2 – Waco, Texas
- February 3 – Tyler, Texas
- February 4 – Beaumont, Texas
- February 5–February 6 – Houston, Texas
- February 7 – Galveston, Texas
- February 8 – Harlingen, Texas
- February 10 – Corpus Christi, Texas
- February 11 – Austin, Texas
- February 12 – San Antonio, Texas
- February 13 – Del Rio, Texas
- February 14 – El Paso, Texas
- February 15 – Santa Fe, New Mexico
- February 16 – Albuquerque, New Mexico
- February 18 – Douglas, Arizona
- February 19 – Tucson, Arizona
- February 20 – Phoenix, Arizona
- February 21 – Yuma, Arizona
- February 22 – San Diego, California
- February 23–February 26 – Los Angeles, California
- February 27 – Pasadena, California
- February 28 – Long Beach, California
- February 29 – San Bernardino, California

=== March 1948 ===
- March 1–March 8 – the train receives a complete overhaul, including a new coat of paint, at the Atchison, Topeka and Santa Fe Railway shops in San Bernardino.
- March 9 – Riverside, California
- March 10 – Bakersfield, California
- March 11 – Fresno, California
- March 12 – Modesto, California
- March 13 – Stockton, California
- March 14–March 16 – San Francisco, California
- March 17 – Palo Alto, California
- March 18 – San Jose, California
- March 19 – Oakland, California
- March 20 – Sacramento, California
- March 21 – Reno, Nevada
- March 23 – Elko, Nevada
- March 24 – Salt Lake City, Utah
- March 25 – Provo, Utah
- March 26 – Ogden, Utah
- March 27 – Pocatello, Idaho
- March 29 – Boise, Idaho
- March 30 – Walla Walla, Washington
- March 31 – Yakima, Washington

=== April 1948 ===
- April 1–April 2 – Portland, Oregon
- April 3 – Eugene, Oregon
- April 4 – Corvallis, Oregon
- April 6 – Salem, Oregon
- April 7 – Olympia, Washington
- April 8 – Tacoma, Washington
- April 9–April 10 – Seattle, Washington
- April 12 – Wenatchee, Washington
- April 13 – Spokane, Washington
- April 14 – Coeur d'Alene, Idaho
- April 15 – Missoula, Montana
- April 16 – Butte, Montana
- April 17 – Helena, Montana
- April 18 – Great Falls, Montana
- April 20 – Billings, Montana
- April 21 – Sheridan, Wyoming
- April 22 – Rapid City, South Dakota
- April 23 – Pierre, South Dakota
- April 24 – Aberdeen, South Dakota
- April 26 – Bismarck, North Dakota
- April 27 – Minot, North Dakota
- April 28 – Jamestown, North Dakota
- April 29 – Fargo, North Dakota
- April 30 – Grand Forks, North Dakota

=== May 1948 ===
- May 1 – Duluth, Minnesota
- May 2 – Superior, Wisconsin
- May 3–May 4 – St. Paul, Minnesota
- May 5–May 6 – Minneapolis, Minnesota
- May 7 – Brainerd, Minnesota
- May 8 – St. Cloud, Minnesota
- May 10 – Willmar, Minnesota
- May 11 – Watertown, South Dakota
- May 12 – Sioux Falls, South Dakota
- May 13 – Sioux City, Iowa
- May 14–May 15 – Omaha, Nebraska
- May 16 – Lincoln, Nebraska
- May 17 – Grand Island, Nebraska
- May 19 – Alliance, Nebraska
- May 20 – Casper, Wyoming
- May 21 – Cheyenne, Wyoming
- May 22–May 23 – Denver, Colorado
- May 24 – Colorado Springs, Colorado
- May 25 – Pueblo, Colorado
- May 26 – Trinidad, Colorado
- May 27 – Amarillo, Texas
- May 29 – Hutchinson, Kansas
- May 30 – Wichita, Kansas
- May 31 – Emporia, Kansas

=== June 1948 ===
- June 1 – Topeka, Kansas
- June 2 – Lawrence, Kansas
- June 3 – Parsons, Kansas
- June 4 – Joplin, Missouri
- June 5 – Springfield, Missouri
- June 6–June 7 – Kansas City, Missouri
- June 9 – St. Joseph, Missouri
- June 10 – Sedalia, Missouri
- June 11 – Jefferson City, Missouri
- June 12–June 14 – St. Louis, Missouri
- June 15 – Hannibal, Missouri
- June 16 – Quincy, Illinois
- June 17 – Burlington, Iowa
- June 18 – Iowa City, Iowa
- June 19 – Cedar Rapids, Iowa
- June 20 – Des Moines, Iowa
- June 21 – Davenport, Iowa
- June 23 – Rockford, Illinois
- June 24 – Madison, Wisconsin
- June 25 – La Crosse, Wisconsin
- June 26 – Eau Claire, Wisconsin
- June 27 – Wausau, Wisconsin
- June 29 – Green Bay, Wisconsin
- June 30 – Oshkosh, Wisconsin

=== July 1948 ===
- July 1–July 2 – Milwaukee, Wisconsin
- July 3 – Racine, Wisconsin
- July 4 – Kenosha, Wisconsin
- July 5–July 9 – Chicago, Illinois (Chicago Railroad Fair)
- July 10 – Gary, Indiana
- July 11 – Joliet, Illinois
- July 13 – Peoria, Illinois
- July 14 – Bloomington, Illinois
- July 15 – Kankakee, Illinois
- July 16 – Champaign, Illinois
- July 17 – Decatur, Illinois
- July 18 – Springfield, Illinois
- July 20 – Belleville, Illinois
- July 21 – Cairo, Illinois
- July 22 – Paducah, Kentucky
- July 23 – Evansville, Indiana
- July 24 – Vincennes, Indiana
- July 25 – Terre Haute, Indiana
- July 27 – Danville, Illinois
- July 28 – Logansport, Indiana
- July 29–July 30 – Indianapolis, Indiana
- July 31–August 1 – Louisville, Kentucky

=== August 1948 ===
- August 2 – Bowling Green, Kentucky
- August 3 – Frankfort, Kentucky
- August 4 – Lexington, Kentucky
- August 5 – Ashland, Kentucky
- August 6 – Portsmouth, Ohio
- August 7–August 8 – Cincinnati, Ohio
- August 10 – Muncie, Indiana
- August 11 – Fort Wayne, Indiana
- August 12 – South Bend, Indiana
- August 13 – Kalamazoo, Michigan
- August 14 – Grand Rapids, Michigan
- August 15 – Muskegon, Michigan
- August 17 – Lansing, Michigan
- August 18 – Battle Creek, Michigan
- August 19 – Ann Arbor, Michigan
- August 20–August 22 – Detroit, Michigan
- August 24 – Jackson, Michigan
- August 25 – Flint, Michigan
- August 26 – Saginaw, Michigan
- August 27 – Port Huron, Michigan
- August 28 – Pontiac, Michigan
- August 29 – Dearborn, Michigan
- August 30 – Monroe, Michigan
- August 31 – Toledo, Ohio

=== September 1948 ===
- September 1 – Sandusky, Ohio
- September 2–September 3 – Cleveland, Ohio
- September 4 – Akron, Ohio
- September 5–September 6 – Columbus, Ohio
- September 7 – Dayton, Ohio
- September 8 – Springfield, Ohio
- September 9 – Lima, Ohio
- September 10 – Canton, Ohio
- September 11 – Youngstown, Ohio
- September 12 – Steubenville, Ohio
- September 14 – Wheeling, West Virginia
- September 15–September 17 – Pittsburgh, Pennsylvania
- September 18 – Erie, Pennsylvania
- September 19 – Oil City, Pennsylvania
- September 21 – Johnstown, Pennsylvania
- September 22 – Cumberland, Maryland
- September 23 – Parkersburg, West Virginia
- September 24 – Clarksburg, West Virginia
- September 25 – Charleston, West Virginia
- September 26 – Huntington, West Virginia
- September 28 – Bluefield, West Virginia
- September 29 – Bristol, Tennessee
- September 30 – Johnson City, Tennessee

=== October 1948 ===
- October 1 – Kingsport, Tennessee
- October 2 – Knoxville, Tennessee
- October 3 – Oak Ridge, Tennessee
- October 5 – Asheville, North Carolina
- October 6 – Danville, Virginia
- October 7 – Winchester, Virginia
- October 8 – Hagerstown, Maryland
- October 9 – York, Pennsylvania
- October 10 – Lancaster, Pennsylvania
- October 11 – Easton, Pennsylvania
- October 12 – Morristown, New Jersey
- October 13–October 14 – Jersey City, New Jersey
- October 15 – Princeton, New Jersey
- October 16–October 17 – Camden, New Jersey
- October 19 – Red Bank, New Jersey
- October 20 – Orange, New Jersey
- October 21 – Montclair, New Jersey
- October 22 – Passaic, New Jersey
- October 23 – Ridgewood, New Jersey
- October 24 – Hackensack, New Jersey
- October 25 – New Brunswick, New Jersey
- October 26 – Havre de Grace, Maryland

== 1949 ==
=== January 1949 ===
- January 22 – Washington, D.C.
