= National Register of Historic Places listings in Idaho County, Idaho =

Location of Idaho County in Idaho

This is a list of the National Register of Historic Places listings in Idaho County, Idaho.

This is intended to be a complete list of the properties and districts on the National Register of Historic Places in Idaho County, Idaho, United States. Latitude and longitude coordinates are provided for many National Register properties and districts; these locations may be seen together in a map.

There are 45 properties and districts listed on the National Register in the county.

This National Park Service list is complete through NPS recent listings posted September 18, 2026.

== Current listings ==
	Name on the Register	Image	Date listed	Location	City or town	Description
1	Ah Toy Garden		June 27, 1990 (#90000893)	Along China Creek near its confluence with the South Fork of the Salmon River in the Payette National Forest; 45°12′57″N 115°33′21″W	Warren	
2	Aitken Barn	Aitken Barn	August 9, 1982 (#82002512)	Southwest of Riggins on U.S. Route 95; 45°24′28″N 116°19′48″W	Riggins vicinity	
3	Arctic Point Fire Lookout	Arctic Point Fire Lookout	August 29, 1994 (#94001019)	North of Big Creek in the Frank Church-River of No Return Wilderness and the Payette National Forest; 45°28′28″N 115°02′19″W	Big Creek	
4	James V. and Sophia Baker House	James V. and Sophia Baker House	January 6, 2004 (#03001366)	204 Broadway St. 46°02′51″N 116°21′04″W	Cottonwood	
5	Polly Bemis House	Polly Bemis House	March 4, 1988 (#87002152)	Accessible on the Salmon River via boat 45°25′59″N 115°40′13″W	Riggins vicinity	
6	Big Cedar School	Big Cedar School	November 29, 2016 (#16000806)	947 Red Fir Rd. 46°05′52″N 115°51′08″W	Kooskia vicinity	
7	Blue Fox Theatre	Blue Fox Theatre	November 30, 1999 (#99001412)	116 W. Main St. 45°55′32″N 116°07′09″W	Grangeville	
8	Burgdorf	Burgdorf	April 14, 1972 (#72000441)	About 15 miles west of Warrens; 45°16′38″N 115°54′46″W	Burgdorf	
9	Butts Point Creek Fire Lookout		December 28, 2018 (#100002786)	Butts Creek Point, approx.. 40 mi. NE of Salmon, ID; Frank Church – River of No Return Wilderness; 45°21′42″N 114°44′15″W	Salmon vicinity	
10	Campbell's Ferry		February 8, 2007 (#07000037)	Southeastern bank of the Salmon River at Mile 148 in the Frank Church-River of No Return Wilderness; 45°29′11″N 115°20′03″W	Riggins vicinity	
11	Carey Dome Fire Lookout	Carey Dome Fire Lookout	March 25, 1994 (#94000268)	Nez Perce National Forest, 9 miles north of United States Forest Service Burgdorf Guard Station; 45°24′10″N 115°54′12″W	Burgdorf	
12	Celadon Slope Garden		June 27, 1990 (#90000891)	Along China Creek near its confluence with the South Fork of the Salmon River in the Payette National Forest; 45°12′58″N 115°34′15″W	Warren	
13	Chamberlain Ranger Station Historic District		January 14, 2004 (#03001388)	Frank Church-River of No Return Wilderness; 45°22′32″N 115°12′02″W	Payette National Forest	
14	Chi-Sandra Garden		June 27, 1990 (#90000892)	Along China Creek near its confluence with the South Fork of the Salmon River in the Payette National Forest; 45°12′52″N 115°33′50″W	Warren	
15	Chinese Cemetery		March 29, 1994 (#94000270)	Payette National Forest, 0.5 miles northwest of Warren Wagon Rd. at B 45°16′22″N 115°41′06″W	Warren	
16	Chinese Mining Camp Archeological Site		September 4, 1994 (#94001018)	Northwest of Warren in the Payette National Forest; 45°16′14″N 115°41′34″W	Warren	
17	Cold Meadows Guard Station		August 19, 1994 (#94001017)	Northeast of McCall in the Frank Church-River of No Return Wilderness and the Payette National Forest; 45°17′10″N 114°56′28″W	McCall vicinity	
18	Deep Creek Ranger Station		December 11, 2013 (#13000902)	West Fork Ranger District, Bitterroot National Forest; 45°42′15″N 114°43′03″W	Bitterroot National Forest	
19	Jurden Henry Elfers Barn and Field	Jurden Henry Elfers Barn and Field	June 7, 2007 (#07000544)	South bank of John Day Creek, ⅓ mile east of U.S. Route 95; 45°34′59″N 116°17′15″W	Lucile	
20	Elk City Wagon Road-Vicory Gulch-Smith Grade Segment		May 21, 2001 (#01000536)	Nez Perce National Forest; 45°51′29″N 115°35′23″W	Elk City vicinity	Surviving segment of historic wagon road to mining town of Elk City.
21	Elk Summit Ranger Station; Elk Summit Guard Station		September 14, 2026 (#100013381)	Powell Ranger District, Nez Perce-Clearwater National Forest; 46°19′36″N 114°38′52″W	Powell vicinity	
22	Fenn Ranger Station	Fenn Ranger Station	June 18, 1990 (#90000931)	Selway Road 223 near Johnson Creek in the Nez Perce National Forest; 46°06′06″N 115°32′41″W	Kooskia vicinity	
23	First Presbyterian Church	First Presbyterian Church	May 13, 1976 (#76000674)	Southeast of Kamiah on U.S. Route 12; 46°12′15″N 116°00′24″W	Kamiah vicinity	
24	Dr. Wilson Foskett Home and Drugstore	Dr. Wilson Foskett Home and Drugstore	April 26, 2005 (#05000337)	West side of River Rd. 45°45′44″N 116°18′01″W	White Bird	
25	Blacky Foster House		April 10, 1992 (#92000307)	Along the Salmon River west of Shoup in the Bitterroot National Forest; 45°29′10″N 114°58′29″W	Shoup	
26	Gardiner Peak Lookout	Gardiner Peak Lookout	April 6, 2018 (#100002295)	Gardiner Peak, West Fork District; 45°58′12″N 114°46′00″W	Bitterroot National Forest	
27	Gold Point Mill	Gold Point Mill	July 14, 2000 (#00000792)	United States Forest Service Road 222; 45°46′56″N 115°23′33″W	Elk City vicinity	
28	Hells Canyon Archeological District	Hells Canyon Archeological District	August 10, 1984 (#84000984)	Address Restricted	Riggins vicinity	Extends into Adams and Nez Perce counties and Wallowa County, Oregon
29	Lochsa Historical Ranger Station	Lochsa Historical Ranger Station	June 9, 1978 (#78001065)	Lewis and Clark Highway (U.S. Route 12); 46°20′20″N 115°19′45″W	Kooskia vicinity	Open as a museum
30	Lower Salmon River Archeological District	Lower Salmon River Archeological District	September 4, 1986 (#86002170)	Address Restricted	Cottonwood vicinity	Extends into Lewis and Nez Perce counties
31	Sue McBeth Cabin	Sue McBeth Cabin	June 3, 1976 (#76000675)	Southeast of Kamiah on U.S. Route 12; 46°12′18″N 116°00′22″W	Kamiah vicinity	
32	Meinert Ranch Cabin		September 23, 1987 (#87001561)	1.8 miles southwest of Red River Hot Springs on Red River-Beargrass Road 234; 45°46′19″N 115°13′22″W	Elk City vicinity	
33	Jim Moore Place		March 29, 1978 (#78001063)	Salmon River Canyon; 45°29′13″N 115°20′14″W	Dixie	
34	Moose Creek Administrative Site		June 25, 1990 (#90000932)	Eastern side of Moose Creek, south of Whistling Pig Creek, in the Nez Perce National Forest; 46°06′40″N 114°55′15″W	Grangeville vicinity	
35	Old China Trail		June 27, 1990 (#90000894)	Along China Creek near its confluence with the South Fork of the Salmon River in the Payette National Forest; 45°13′00″N 115°33′48″W	Warren	
36	Riggins High School	Riggins High School	October 10, 2024 (#100010901)	121 N. Main Street; 45°25′22″N 116°18′53″W	Riggins	
37	Riggins Motel	Riggins Motel	September 14, 2001 (#01000979)	615 S. State Highway 95; 45°25′05″N 116°19′02″W	Riggins	
38	St. Gertrude's Convent and Chapel	St. Gertrude's Convent and Chapel	June 18, 1979 (#79000790)	West of Cottonwood; 46°02′01″N 116°23′25″W	Cottonwood vicinity	
39	Salmon Mountain Lookout		April 6, 2018 (#100002296)	Salmon Mtn., West Fork District; 45°37′01″N 114°50′12″W	Bitterroot National Forest	
40	State Bank of Kooskia	State Bank of Kooskia	May 22, 1978 (#78001067)	1 S. Main St. 46°08′24″N 115°58′40″W	Kooskia	
41	Tolo Lake	Tolo Lake	February 7, 2011 (#10001200)	Tolo Lake Rd., Nez Perce National Historical Park; 45°54′54″N 116°14′10″W	Grangeville vicinity	Tolo Lake page on NPS website
42	Warren Guard Station, Building 1206		April 7, 1994 (#94000271)	Southwestern side of Warren Wagon Rd., United States Forest Service Highway 21; 45°16′02″N 115°40′16″W	Warren	
43	White Bird Battlefield	White Bird Battlefield	July 18, 1974 (#74000332)	North of White Bird off U.S. Route 95; 45°47′30″N 116°16′47″W	White Bird vicinity	
44	White Bird Grade	White Bird Grade	July 30, 1974 (#74000740)	Northeast of White Bird; 45°48′58″N 116°15′11″W	White Bird vicinity	Switchbacks and winding roadway of Old Highway 95, formerly U.S. Highway 95, an engineering feat when built in 1920 as part of "good roads" movement.
45	Yawwinma Traditional Cultural Property	Yawwinma Traditional Cultural Property	June 12, 2017 (#100001053)	143 Rapid River Rd. 45°22′19″N 116°21′46″W	Riggins vicinity	

== Former listings ==
	Name on the Register	Image	Date listed	Date removed	Location	City or town	Description
1	Grangeville Savings and Trust		July 24, 1978 (#78001064)	March 28, 1989	State and Main Sts.	Grangeville	Destroyed by fire, January 30, 1989.
2	O'Hara House		October 2, 1978 (#78001066)	March 1, 1991	E of Kooskia off U.S. 12	Kooskia vicinity	Destroyed by fire, January 11, 1991.
3	Wylies Peak Lookout		June 5, 1975 (#75000632)	October 17, 1983	Nez Perce National Forest	Grangeville vicinity	Destroyed by lightning in 1983

== See also ==
- List of National Historic Landmarks in Idaho
- National Register of Historic Places listings in Idaho
