= Old China Trail =

- U.S. National Register of Historic Places
- Location within Idaho Location within the United States
- Location: Along China Creek near its confluence with the South Fork of the Salmon River in the Payette National Forest, near Warren in Idaho County, Idaho
- Coordinates: 45.216667°N 115.563333°W
- Area: less than one acre
- MPS: Chinese Sites in the Warren Mining District MPS
- NRHP reference No.: 90000894
- Added to NRHP: June 27, 1990

The Old China Trail is a packed dirt trail along China Creek near its confluence with the South Fork of the Salmon River in the Payette National Forest, near Warren in Idaho County, Idaho. It was listed on the National Register of Historic Places in 1990.

It runs from the Celadon Slope Garden down a southeast facing ridge to the Chi-Sandra Garden.
