= Ah Toy Garden =

Garden in Warren, Idaho, United States

- U.S. National Register of Historic Places
- Location within Idaho Location within the United States
- Nearest city: Along China Cr. near jct. with S. Fork Salmon R., Payette NF, Warren, Idaho
- Coordinates: 45°12′57″N 115°33′21″W
- NRHP reference No.: 90000893
- Added to NRHP: June 27, 1990

Ah Toy Garden is a garden located within Payette National Forest in Warren, Idaho, United States. The garden was established by the Chinese American community in order to grow fruits and vegetables to maintain a traditional Chinese diet while Chinese immigrant laborers worked in the mines. There are three other Chinese-American gardens in the Warren Mining District.

The garden was listed in the National Register of Historic Places on June 27, 1990.

== See also ==
- History of Chinese Americans in Idaho
- National Register of Historic Places listings in Idaho County, Idaho
