= Salmon Mountain Lookout =

- U.S. National Register of Historic Places
- Location within Idaho Location within the United States
- Nearest city: Elk City, Idaho
- Coordinates: 45°37′01″N 114°50′12″W
- Built: 1949
- Built by: USDA Forest Service
- NRHP reference No.: 100002296
- Added to NRHP: April 6, 2018

The Salmon Mountain Lookout, on Salmon Mountain in the West Fork District of Bitterroot National Forest, near Darby, Idaho, was built in 1949. It was listed on the National Register of Historic Places in 2018.

It is a 1936-pattern L-4 lookout.

It is a volunteer-staffed lookout located in the Frank Church River of No Return Wilderness, and it also overlooks the Selway Bitterroot Wilderness to the north.

It is at elevation of 8,943 feet (2,726 m).

Salmon Mountain is located in the Idaho portion of the West Fork in the Frank Church River Of No Return Wilderness. It has the distinction of being the oldest documented site used as a lookout on the Bitterroot Forest. An old journal from 1915 describes Salmon being used as an observation point and a phone line being run up the mountain that summer. A tent camp was placed on the upper part of the mountain and at the highest point, a square rock wall was built that surrounded a portable alidade on a stump. The first tower, a log cabin with an observation cupola, was built on Salmon Mountain in 1928. It was replaced, in 1949, with the current L-4 lookout on a 5 foot rock base that is still in use. There is a 1.2 mile trail leading to the lookout from the Magruder Corridor/ Elk City Road.
