= Chinese Mining Camp Archeological Site =

- Chinese Mining Camp Archaeological Site
- U.S. National Register of Historic Places
- Location within Idaho Location within the United States
- Location: About one mile northeast of Warren, Idaho
- Coordinates: 45°16′14″N 115°41′34″W
- Area: less than one acre
- MPS: Chinese Sites in the Warren Mining District MPS
- NRHP reference No.: 94001018
- Added to NRHP: September 4, 1994

The Chinese Mining Camp Archaeological Site near Warren, Idaho is an archaeological site which was listed on the National Register of Historic Places in 1994.

It is located about one mile northwest of the town of Warren, up a trail from the north end of Warren's airstrip. It "occupies a cultural island which consists of approximately 2,500 square meters or 0.62 acres". The site was investigated by an archaeological study in 1989–1992.

== See also ==
- History of Chinese Americans in Idaho
- National Register of Historic Places listings in Idaho County, Idaho
