= Gospel Hump Wilderness =

Wilderness area in Idaho, United States

- IUCN category Ib (wilderness area)
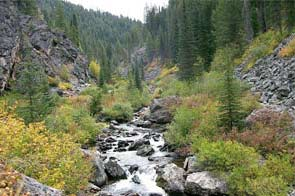
- Crooked Creek in Gospel Hump Wilderness

- Location within the United States
- Location: Idaho County, Idaho, United States
- Nearest city: Elk City, Idaho
- Coordinates: 45°33′57″N 115°46′32″W
- Area: 205,796 acres (832.83 km^{2})
- Established: February 24, 1978
- Governing body: U.S. Forest Service

The Gospel Hump Wilderness is a federally-protected wilderness area that covers 205,796 acres (83,283 ha) of the state of Idaho. Managed by the U.S. Forest Service in the U.S. Department of Agriculture, it received wilderness designation on February 24, 1978 through the passage of the Endangered American Wilderness Act and is part of Nez Perce National Forest. As part of the National Wilderness Preservation System, the Gospel Hump Wilderness is an area where human development and use are restricted and people are to remain only visitors.

== History ==
The Nez Perce people lived in Idaho as early as 6000 BCE, and the area that is now the Gospel Hump Wilderness was used by them long before the arrival of settlers. In 1861 gold was discovered in Florence, Idaho, just outside the wilderness's boundary. A quartz vein at the base of Buffalo Hump was discovered in 1898, which sparked a gold rush before mining subsided in 1903. Remnants of mines and other structures remain in the wilderness. The wilderness was formally established on February 24, 1978 when Congress passed Public Law 95-237.

== Management ==
When the Gospel Hump Wilderness is combined with the adjacent Frank Church-River of No Return Wilderness Area and the surrounding unprotected inventoried roadless area, it is part of a 3,300,000-acre (13,000 km^{2}) wilderness-roadless area complex. To the north of the Frank Church-River of No Return Wilderness Area lies the Selway-Bitterroot Wilderness Area. These two large Wilderness areas are separated only by a single dirt road (the Magruder Corridor), connecting Red River, Idaho to Darby, Montana. Negating the Magruder Corridor, the Selway-Bitterroot, Gospel Hump and Frank Church-River of No Return Wilderness Areas constitute the largest intact piece of wildland in the United States outside of Alaska.

A management plan was established in 1983 and provides guidance for the Forest Service on management of the wilderness. The Wilderness Act of 1964 enhanced the protection status of remote or undeveloped land already contained within federally administered protected areas. Passage of the act ensured that no human improvements would take place aside from those already existing. The protected status in wilderness-designated zones prohibits road and building construction, oil and mineral exploration or extraction, and logging, and also prohibits the use of motorized equipment, including bicycles. The only manner in which people can enter wilderness areas is either on foot or horseback. Hunting and fishing are permitted in the wilderness, just as they are throughout the Nez Perce National Forest, provided those engaging in such activities have the proper licenses and permits.

== Recreation ==
There are no roads in the wilderness, and motorized vehicles are prohibited. However, several unpaved roads provide access to the wilderness, but are usually only accessible during the summer months. No permits are required for recreational visits, but group size is limited to 20 people and 20 head of stock and there is a fourteen-day limit for camping at one site.

In 1982 it was estimated that the wilderness had 29,000 recreation visitor days. Half of summer use is from hikers, half of which camp in the wilderness. The majority of visitors during the fall are hunters.

== Geography and geology ==
Elevations in the wilderness range from 1,970 feet (600 m) at the Wind River pack bridge across the Salmon River to 8,940 feet (2,720 m) at the summit of Buffalo Hump. The Salmon River forms the southern border of the wilderness and separates it from the adjacent Frank Church—River of No Return Wilderness. Several alpine lakes are located in high-elevation basins below the mountain peaks in the wilderness.

Rock units in the wilderness include gneiss along the Salmon River, the Hood Quartzite and Yellowjacket Formation (Precambrian in age), and undifferentiated granite of the Idaho Batholith.

== Natural Resources ==
The southern section of the wilderness is dry and sparsely forested, while the northern section is moist and heavily forested. Mean annual precipitation ranges from 18 inches (460 mm) along the Salmon River to 60 inches (150 cm) at higher elevations, and snowpacks can reach 10 to 15 feet (3.0 to 4.6 m) at higher elevations. At lower elevations ponderosa pine and cheat grass dominate, while higher elevations are covered by lodgepole pine, Douglas-fir, subalpine fir, and whitebark pine along with whortleberry and beargrass. The two parts of the wilderness are separated by the mountain divide for which the wilderness is named. Fish present in the wilderness include sockeye salmon, chinook salmon, rainbow trout, westslope cutthroat trout, bull trout, mountain whitefish, and smallmouth bass. Elk, mule deer, white-tailed deer, black bears, mountain lions, mountain goats, gray wolves, moose, and bighorn sheep are large mammals found in the wilderness. Hunting and fishing are permitted in the wilderness, provided proper permits are obtained in the appropriate season.

== See also ==
- List of U.S. Wilderness Areas
- Wilderness Act
