= Lochsa Historical Ranger Station =

- U.S. National Register of Historic Places
- U.S. Historic district
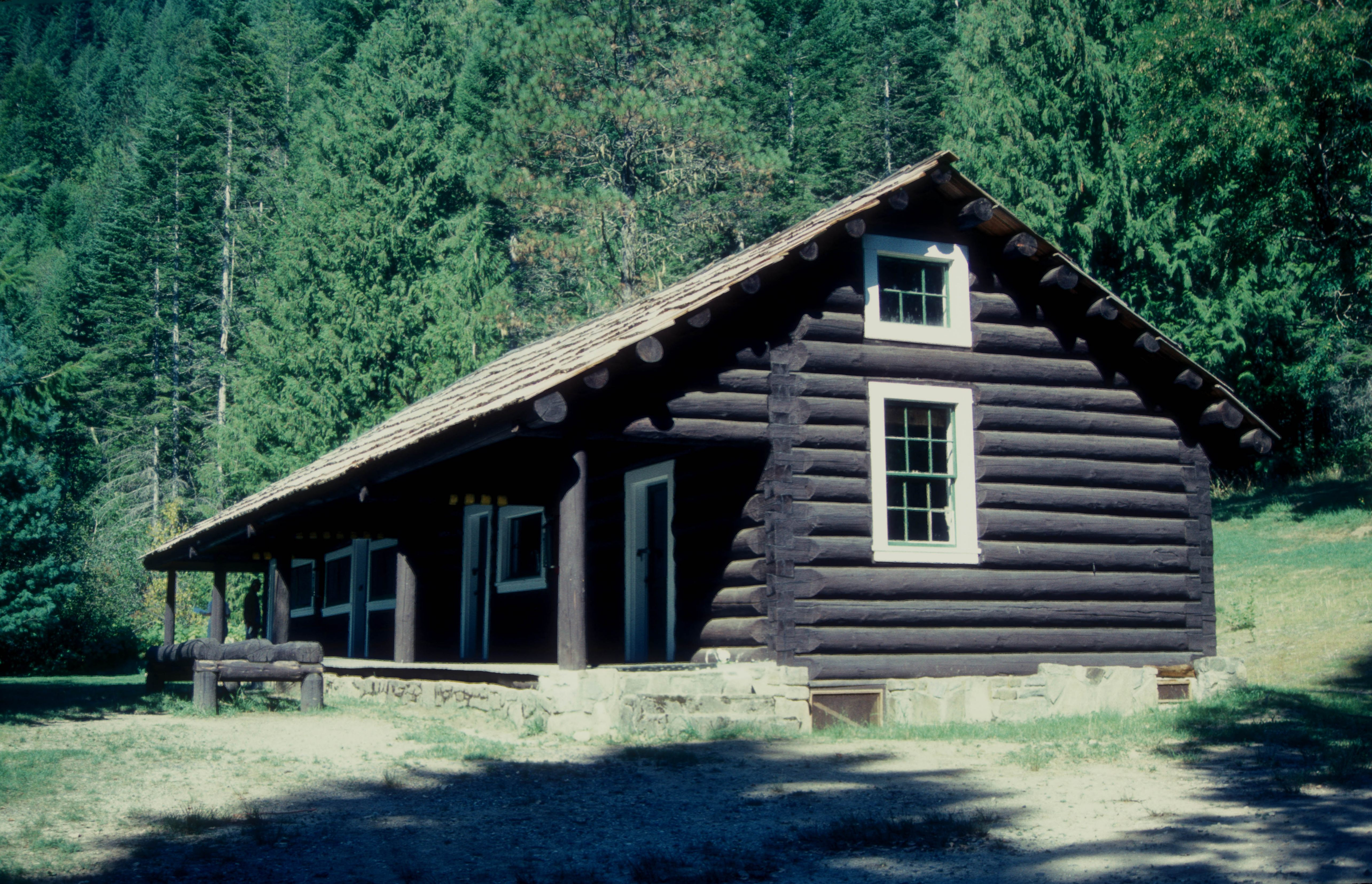

- Location within Idaho Location within the United States
- Location: U.S. Highway 12, Idaho County, near Kooskia, Idaho
- Coordinates: 46.338790°N 115.329096°W
- Area: 20 acres (8.1 ha)
- Built: 1927-1933
- Built by: U.S. Forest Service
- NRHP reference No.: 78001065
- Added to NRHP: June 9, 1978

The Lochsa Historical Ranger Station, near Kooskia in Idaho County, Idaho, was built during 1927 to 1933. It served as administrative headquarters for the Lochsa Ranger District from 1922 to 1957. It was located within the Selway National Forest which was later merged into the Clearwater National Forest and the Nezperce National Forest. It was listed on the National Register of Historic Places in 1978.

It is located on the Lochsa River. It was once isolated, accessible only by trail, but by 1976 the Lewis and Clark Highway (U.S. Highway 12) passed by.

The listing included four contributing buildings:

- Combination building (1927–1933), built as four separate buildings later joined by a common roof
- Ranger dwelling (1932)
- Alternate ranger dwelling (1931)
- Boulder Creek cabin

The station is open as a museum; a self-guided walking tour is available.
