= Celadon Slope Garden =

- U.S. National Register of Historic Places
- Location within Idaho Location within the United States
- Location: Along China Creek near its confluence with the South Fork of the Salmon River in the Payette National Forest, in the vicinity of Warren, Idaho
- Coordinates: 45.216111°N 115.570833°W
- Area: 15 acres (6.1 ha)
- Architectural style: Root cellar
- MPS: Chinese Sites in the Warren Mining District MPS
- NRHP reference No.: 90000891
- Added to NRHP: June 27, 1990

The Celadon Slope Garden, also known as Hays Station, in Payette National Forest in Idaho County, Idaho in the vicinity of Warren, Idaho, was listed on the National Register of Historic Places in 1990.

The listed site included five contributing structures and two contributing sites on 15 acres (6.1 ha). It consists of the remains of more than 30 terraces, an irrigation ditch, a root cellar, three rock cairns, and scattered artifacts of Chinese origin.

== See also ==
- History of Chinese Americans in Idaho
- National Register of Historic Places listings in Idaho County, Idaho
