= Warren Guard Station, Building 1206 =

- U.S. National Register of Historic Places
- Location within Idaho Location within the United States
- Location: Southwestern side of Warren Wagon Rd. (United States Forest Service Highway 21), Payette National Forest, Warren, Idaho
- Coordinates: 45°16′2″N 115°40′16″W
- Area: less than one acre
- Built: 1934
- Built by: USFS; CCC
- Architectural style: Shevlin-sided cabin
- NRHP reference No.: 94000271
- Added to NRHP: April 7, 1994

Warren Guard Station, Building 1206 was built in 1934. It was designed by architects of the United States Forest Service and was built by the Civilian Conservation Corps. It is located on the southwestern side of Warren Wagon Rd. (United States Forest Service Highway 21), in Payette National Forest in the former city limits of what is now unincorporated Warren, Idaho. It was listed on the National Register of Historic Places in 1994.

The building is a 16 by 40 feet (4.9 m × 12.2 m) "Shotgun ('Rocky Mountain Cabin') style building, with classical refinements such as the temple front, columns with capital moldings, and six-over-six sash. It is of wood frame construction on a concrete foundation, with a north facing corrugated metal (steel) gable roof. The siding is Shevlin log cabin siding (developed by Shevlin-Hixon Lumber to emulate log construction)."
