= Carey Dome Fire Lookout =

- U.S. National Register of Historic Places

- Location within Idaho Location within the United States
- Nearest city: Burgdorf, Idaho
- Coordinates: 45°24′10″N 115°54′12″W
- Area: less than one acre
- Built by: USDA Forest Service
- Architectural style: 7 x 7 steel tower
- NRHP reference No.: 94000268
- Added to NRHP: March 25, 1994

The Carey Dome Fire Lookout is a fire lookout tower complex located in Payette National Forest, 9 miles north of United States Forest Service Burgdorf Guard Station, near Burgdorf in Idaho County, Idaho. It was listed on the National Register of Historic Places in 1994.

The listing included two contributing structures (a fire lookout tower and a weather station), one contributing building (a log cabin residence), and a non-contributing structure (a flagpole).

The tower is an Aermotor Company steel tower assembled in 1934, which has a 7 by 7 feet (2.1 m × 2.1 m) steel cab at the top. It is 85 feet (26 m) tall from ground level to top of the cab.

The log cabin was built in 1943.

The weather station was installed in the 1950s or before.
