= Cold Meadows Guard Station =

- U.S. National Register of Historic Places
- U.S. Historic district
- Location within Idaho Location within the United States
- Nearest city: Northeast of McCall in the Frank Church-River of No Return Wilderness and the Payette National Forest, in Idaho County, Idaho
- Coordinates: 45°17′10″N 114°56′28″W
- Area: 3.8 acres (1.5 ha)
- Built: 1918, 1923, 1929, 1931, 1935
- Architectural style: Forest Service rustic style
- NRHP reference No.: 94001017
- Added to NRHP: August 19, 1994

The Cold Meadows Guard Station is a ranger station located northeast of McCall, Idaho in the Frank Church-River of No Return Wilderness and the Payette National Forest. It was listed on the National Register of Historic Places in 1994.

The listing included five contributing buildings and one contributing structure: a dwelling, a bunkhouse, a storehouse, a woodshed, an outhouse, and a "Fly Shed". The Fly Shed, a 21 by 30 feet (6.4 m × 9.1 m) structure built of logs and canvas, was built in 1918; the rest of the complex was complete by 1935.

The NRHP nomination asserts that "the guard/ranger station complex is among the most remote in the lower 48 states."
