= Chamberlain Ranger Station Historic District =

Historic district in Idaho, United States

- U.S. National Register of Historic Places
- U.S. Historic district
- Location within Idaho Location within the United States
- Location: Frank Church-River of No Return Wilderness, Payette National Forest, Idaho County, Idaho
- Coordinates: 45.375556°N 115.200556°W
- Area: 100 acres (40 ha)
- Built: 1921
- Architect: USFS architects
- Architectural style: Rustic
- NRHP reference No.: 03001388
- Added to NRHP: January 14, 2004

The Chamberlain Ranger Station Historic District, also known as the Chamberlain Guard Station, is located in the Frank Church-River of No Return Wilderness within Payette National Forest in Idaho County, Idaho. It was listed on the National Register of Historic Places in 2004.

The listing was for a 100 acres (40 ha) area which included four contributing buildings and two contributing sites. The station's residence was built during 1937 to 1938. It is a one-and-a-half-story 28 by 33 feet (8.5 m × 10.1 m) log building on a concrete and rock masonry foundation, based on a USFS Standard Plan model R-4 #53-c. Its walls are peeled lodgepole pine logs from trees cut on the site. Its corners are saddle-notched.

Other structures include one built during the first decade of the 20th century, moved to the site in 1954, and another built c.1921.
