= Gardiner Peak Lookout =

- U.S. National Register of Historic Places
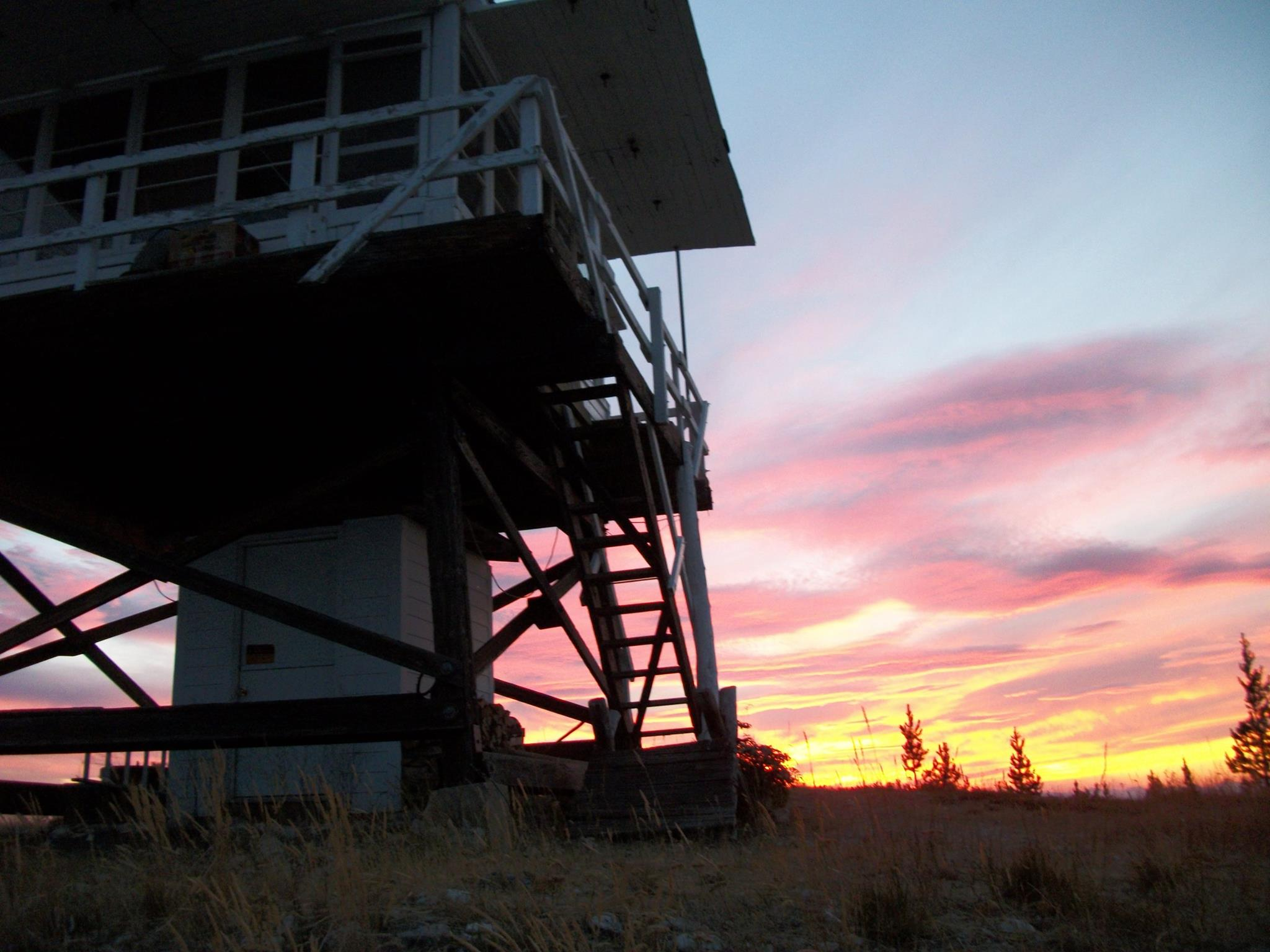

- Location within Idaho Location within the United States
- Nearest city: Darby, Idaho
- Coordinates: 45°58′12″N 114°46′00″W
- Built: 1953
- Built by: USDA Forest Service
- NRHP reference No.: 100002295
- Added to NRHP: April 6, 2018

The Gardiner Peak Lookout, on Gardiner Peak in the West Fork District of Bitterroot National Forest, near Darby, Idaho, was built in 1953. It was listed on the National Register of Historic Places in 2018.

It is a 1936-pattern L-4 lookout.

It is a staffed lookout. It is on Gardiner Peak, above the Selway River, within the Selway-Bitterroot Wilderness Area on the boundary between the Nez Perce National Forest and the Bitterroot National Forest.

It is at elevation of 6,597 feet (2,011 m).
