= Fenn Ranger Station =

- U.S. National Register of Historic Places
- U.S. Historic district
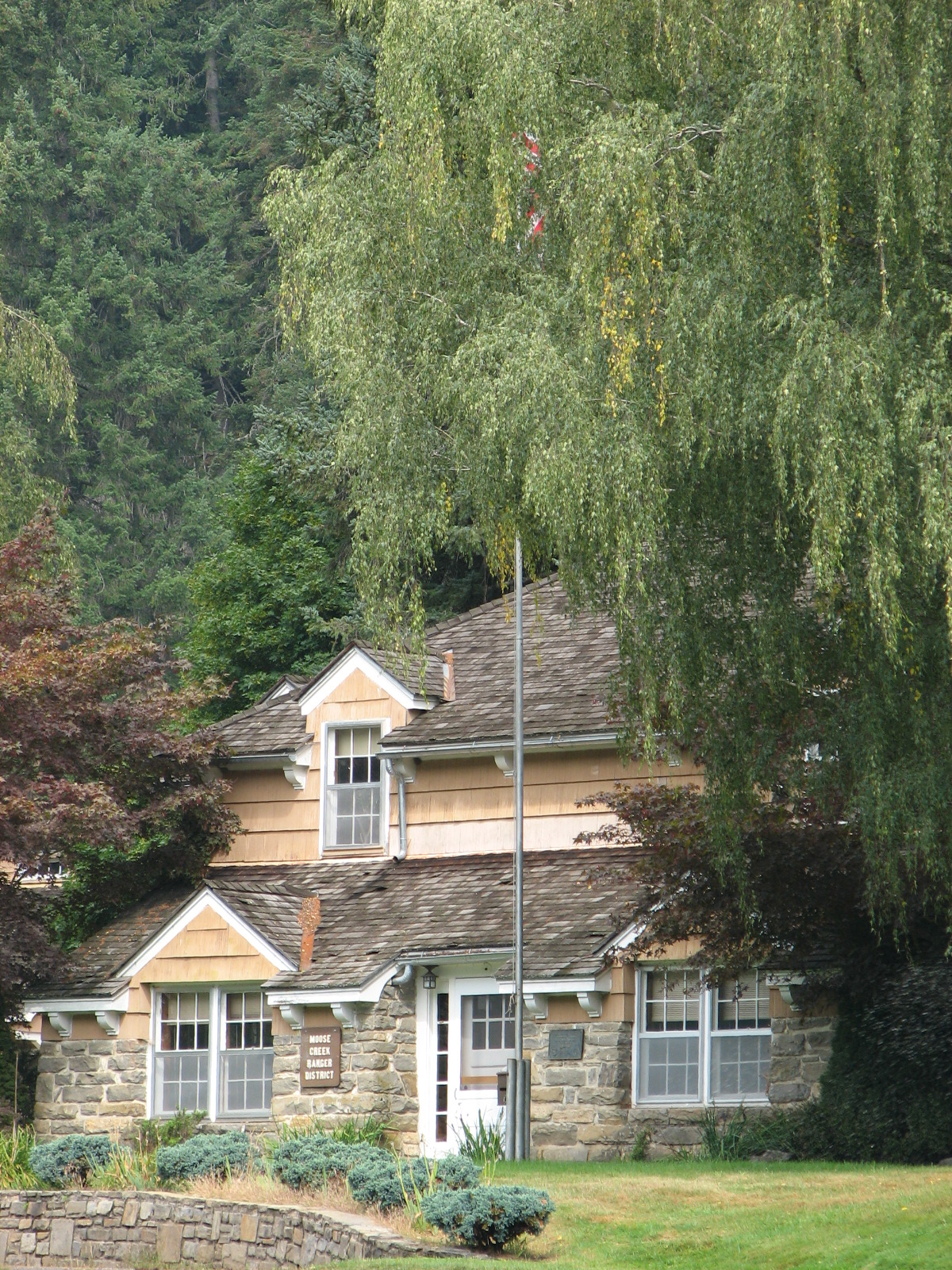

- Location within Idaho Location within the United States
- Location: Selway Rd. 223 near Johnson Cr., Nez Perce NF, Kooskia, Idaho
- Coordinates: 46.10093°N 115.54561°W
- Area: 14 acres (5.7 ha)
- Built: 1937
- Architect: William Fox
- Architectural style: USFS rustic architecture
- NRHP reference No.: 90000931
- Added to NRHP: June 18, 1990

Fenn Ranger Station is a U.S. Forest Service ranger station in the Nez Perce National Forest near Kooskia, Idaho. The ranger station serves as the headquarters of the Moose Creek Ranger District, which encompasses 870,000 acres (350,000 ha) of the forest. The Civilian Conservation Corps began building the ranger station in 1936 and finished the main administration building as well as two garages and two warehouses in 1937. Various other structures were added to the site in the next three years, with the last building, a barn, completed in 1940. The ranger station was added to the National Register of Historic Places on June 18, 1990.
