= Blacky Foster House =

Historic house in Idaho, United States

- U.S. National Register of Historic Places
- Location within Idaho Location within the United States
- Nearest city: Shoup, Idaho
- Coordinates: 45°29′10″N 114°58′29″W
- Area: less than one acre
- Built: c.1930
- NRHP reference No.: 92000307
- Added to NRHP: April 10, 1992

The Blacky Foster House in the vicinity of Shoup, Idaho was built in about 1930. It has also been known as Smith Gulch Cabin and Johnny Briggs Cabin. It was listed on the National Register of Historic Places in 1992.

The cabin is located within the Frank Church-River of No Return Wilderness. It is accessible only by pack trail or by river. It is located on a river bench north of the Salmon River, about 50 feet (15 m) west of Smith Gulch, which brings a small stream to the river.

It is a single room log cabin with a gable roof, built of peeled logs. It has three tiers of horizontal logs, above which are vertical poles about 6 inches (15 cm) to 11 inches (28 cm) in diameter, rising up to 2 by 6 inches (51 mm × 152 mm) plates at the eaves.
