= Elk City Wagon Road-Vicory Gulch-Smith Grade Segment =

- U.S. National Register of Historic Places
- Location within Idaho Location within the United States
- Location: Nez Perce National Forest, near Elk City, Idaho
- Coordinates: 45°51′29″N 115°35′23″W
- Area: 2.9 acres (1.2 ha)
- MPS: Elk City Wagon Road MPS
- NRHP reference No.: 01000536
- Added to NRHP: May 21, 2001

The Elk City Wagon Road-Vicory Gulch-Smith Grade Segment in the Nez Perce National Forest in Idaho County, Idaho, was listed on the National Register of Historic Places in 2001. It is located in the vicinity of Elk City.

The Elk City Wagon Road was a 53-mile-long (85 km) road built during 1894 to 1895 from Harpster southeast to the mining town of Elk City. It was built mainly along the route of a pack trail, the Southern Nez Perce Trail, which had been established by 1861, but the wagon trail differed in that it included switchbacks up steep sections and included corduroy road through swamps.
