= Burgdorf, Idaho =

Unincorporated community in Idaho County, Idaho, United States

- U.S. National Register of Historic Places
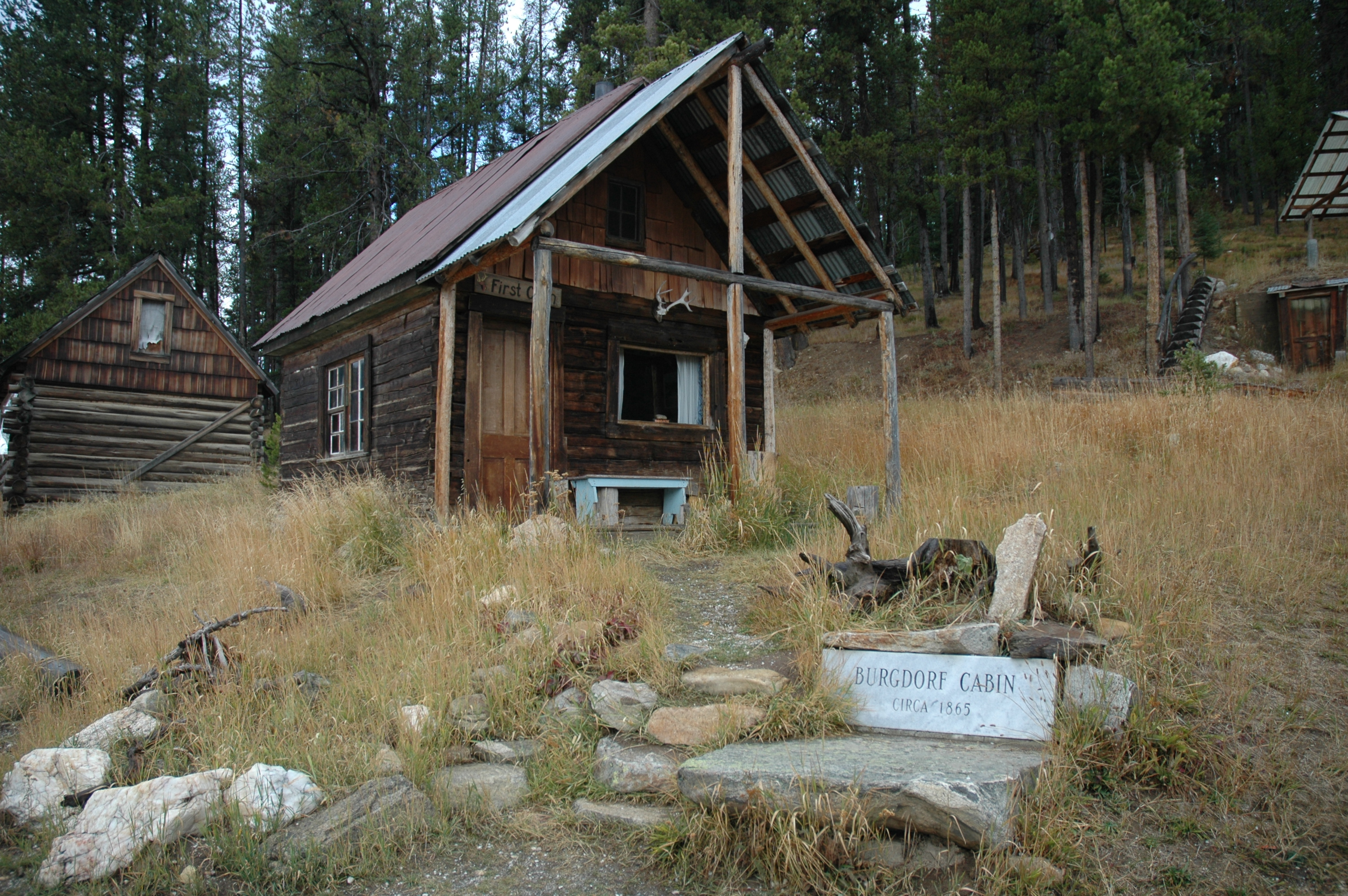
- Rustic cabin at Burgdorf in 2008

- Location within Idaho Location within the United States
- Nearest city: Warren, Idaho; McCall, Idaho
- Coordinates: 45.277°N 115.914°W
- Built: 1901
- NRHP reference No.: 72000441
- Added to NRHP: April 14, 1972

Burgdorf is an unincorporated community in the western United States, located in Idaho County, Idaho, approximately thirty miles (50 km) north-northeast of McCall, at an elevation of 6,115 feet (1,864 m) above sea level.

== History ==
Originally a sacred site for Native Americans, its hot springs were discovered by unknown Chinese miners, and settled by young German immigrant Fred C. Burgdorf in the late 1860s. Burgdorf had mined in nearby Warren to the east and turned the area at the hot springs into a resort by 1870.

Following a new mining rush in 1898 at Thunder Gulch, the resort was refurbished and expanded in 1902 by Burgdorf and his new young wife, a singer from Denver named Janette Foronsard. Originally known as "Resort," it became "Burgdorf" at this time, but the former name continued in usage for several years. Following Janette's death in 1923, Burgdorf sold his interest and moved to Weiser. Burgdorf's population in 1925 was 13.

Much of the community has now been deserted, although reconstruction has been attempted. The community possessed a post office as late as 1945, although it has since been closed.

In 1972, the community was added as a historic district to the National Register of Historic Places. A new county road section through the hot springs property was constructed in the early 1980s.

Basketball coach George Karl was once part owner of Burgdorf.

== See also ==
- National Register of Historic Places listings in Idaho County, Idaho
