= Riggins Motel =

- U.S. National Register of Historic Places
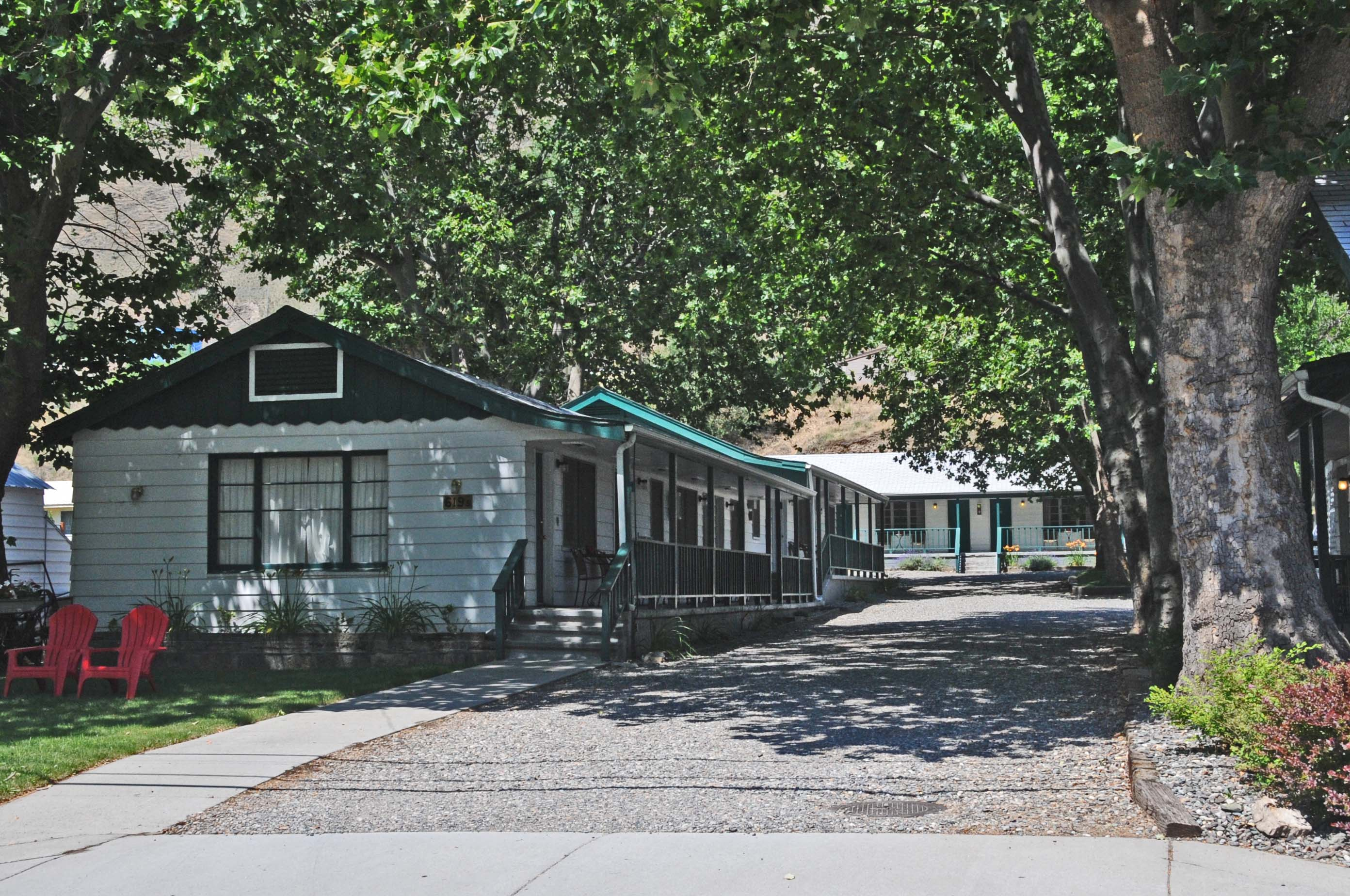

- Location within Idaho Location within the United States
- Location: 615 S. State Highway 95, Riggins, Idaho
- Coordinates: 45°25′5″N 116°19′2″W
- Area: less than one acre
- Built: 1946
- Built by: Rowe, Leonard
- Architectural style: Minimal Traditional
- NRHP reference No.: 01000979
- Added to NRHP: September 14, 2001

The Riggins Motel, at 615 S. State Highway 95 in Riggins in Idaho County, Idaho, was listed on the National Register of Historic Places in 2001. It has also been known as Rowe Motel. The listing included five contributing buildings and a contributing object.

It is a U-shaped motel complex consisting of two cottages and three multi-unit sections totaling 18 rooms. Its first cottage was built in 1946, a second was built in 1946, and the remainder was built in 1947–50, in 1951–52, and in 1952. They are one-story frame buildings on poured concrete foundations, which "reflect the Minimal Traditional style popular in the 1940s and 1950s." The complex was deemed notable as "The cottages and the motel units composing the Riggins Motel exemplify the combination and transition of early roadside hostelry from the cottage-camp phase to the motor-court phase of American roadside architecture. The buildings embody the characteristics and design typical of post-WWII motel architecture."
