= Chinese Cemetery (Idaho) =

- U.S. National Register of Historic Places
- Location within Idaho Location within the United States
- Location: Payette National Forest, 0.5 miles northwest of Warren Wagon Rd. at B, Warren, Idaho, United States
- Coordinates: 45°16′22″N 115°41′06″W
- Area: 12,410 acres (5,020 ha)
- Built: 1800s
- NRHP reference No.: 94000270
- Added to NRHP: March 29, 1994

Chinese Cemetery, also known as Chinese Cemetery, Warren Mining District, is a cemetery located near Warren, Idaho. It is the only ethnic Chinese cemetery in Idaho that is listed on the National Register of Historic Places and was listed on March 29, 1994. The cemetery was created to hold the remains of Chinese migrant laborers who came to Idaho to work as miners, though many of the bodies have since been exhumed and returned to China.

== See also ==
- History of Chinese Americans in Idaho
