= Gold Point Mill =

- U.S. National Register of Historic Places
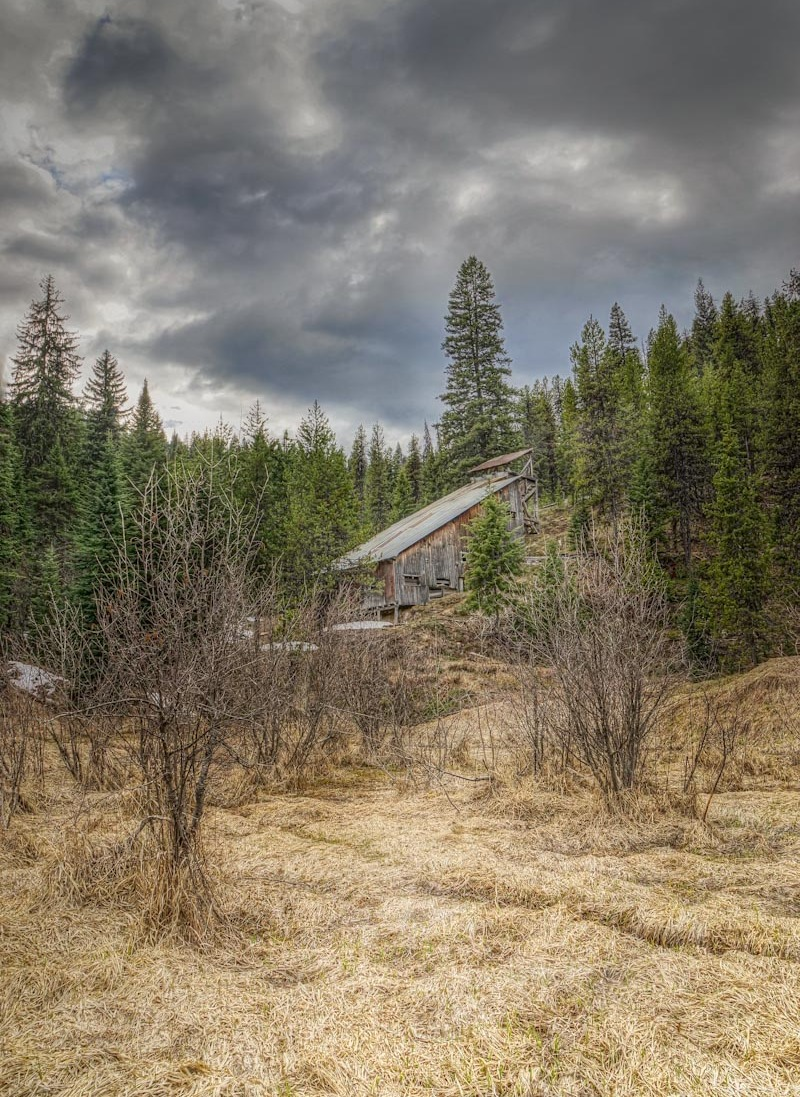

- Location within Idaho Location within the United States
- Location: United States Forest Service Road 222, vicinity of Elk City, Idaho
- Coordinates: 45°46′56″N 115°23′33″W
- Area: less than one acre
- Built: 1936
- NRHP reference No.: 00000792
- Added to NRHP: July 14, 2000

Gold Point Mill, located is on United States Forest Service Road 222 near Elk City in Idaho County, Idaho. It was listed on the National Register of Historic Places in 2000.

The building, on a hillside, is a shed-roofed rectangular building constructed in 1936 which housed machinery for amalgamation and concentration of gold ore. It was deemed significant "because it reflects the 1930s boom in lode mining in Idaho County caused by higher prices of gold and improved transportation [and] because of its architectural design and its extraordinarily well-preserved interior. Still intact inside the mill are the jaw crusher, ball mill, rake classifier, bucket elevator, and shaker tables, plus drive shafts, water pipes, launders, and miscellaneous other machinery. The flow of ore inside the mill can be followed from the coarse ore bin at the top to the troughs for concentrates at the bottom. The mill only processed ore for a very short period before the company ran out of cash and of gold-bearing ore, but this is typical of many Idaho County lode mines of this period. Gold Point Mines owned the mill and associated claims and other improvements from 1934 until 1957; they sold to the property to Floyd Patrin, who owned it until 1996. The mill itself has excellent integrity of location, design, setting, materials, workmanship, feeling, and association. The only major changes to the exterior of the mill are the loss of the metal shed housing the steam plant and the loss of the log trestle that supported a ramp leading to the hopper of the coarse ore bin."
