= Meinert Ranch Cabin =

Historic house in Idaho, United States

- U.S. National Register of Historic Places
- Location within Idaho Location within the United States
- Location: 1.8 miles southwest of Red River Hot Springs on Red River-Beargrass Road 234, near Elk City in Idaho County, Idaho
- Coordinates: 45°46′19″N 115°13′22″W
- Area: 0.8 acres (0.32 ha)
- Built: 1915
- Built by: Meinert, Irad; Meinert, Emma
- Architectural style: Log cabin
- NRHP reference No.: 87001561
- Added to NRHP: September 23, 1987

The Meinert Ranch Cabin is located 1.8 miles southwest of Red River Hot Springs on Red River-Beargrass Road 234, near Elk City in Idaho County, Idaho. It was built in 1915. It was listed on the National Register of Historic Places in 1987.

It is a one-and-a-half-story log cabin with a gambrel roof.
