= Jurden Henry Elfers Barn and Field =

- U.S. National Register of Historic Places
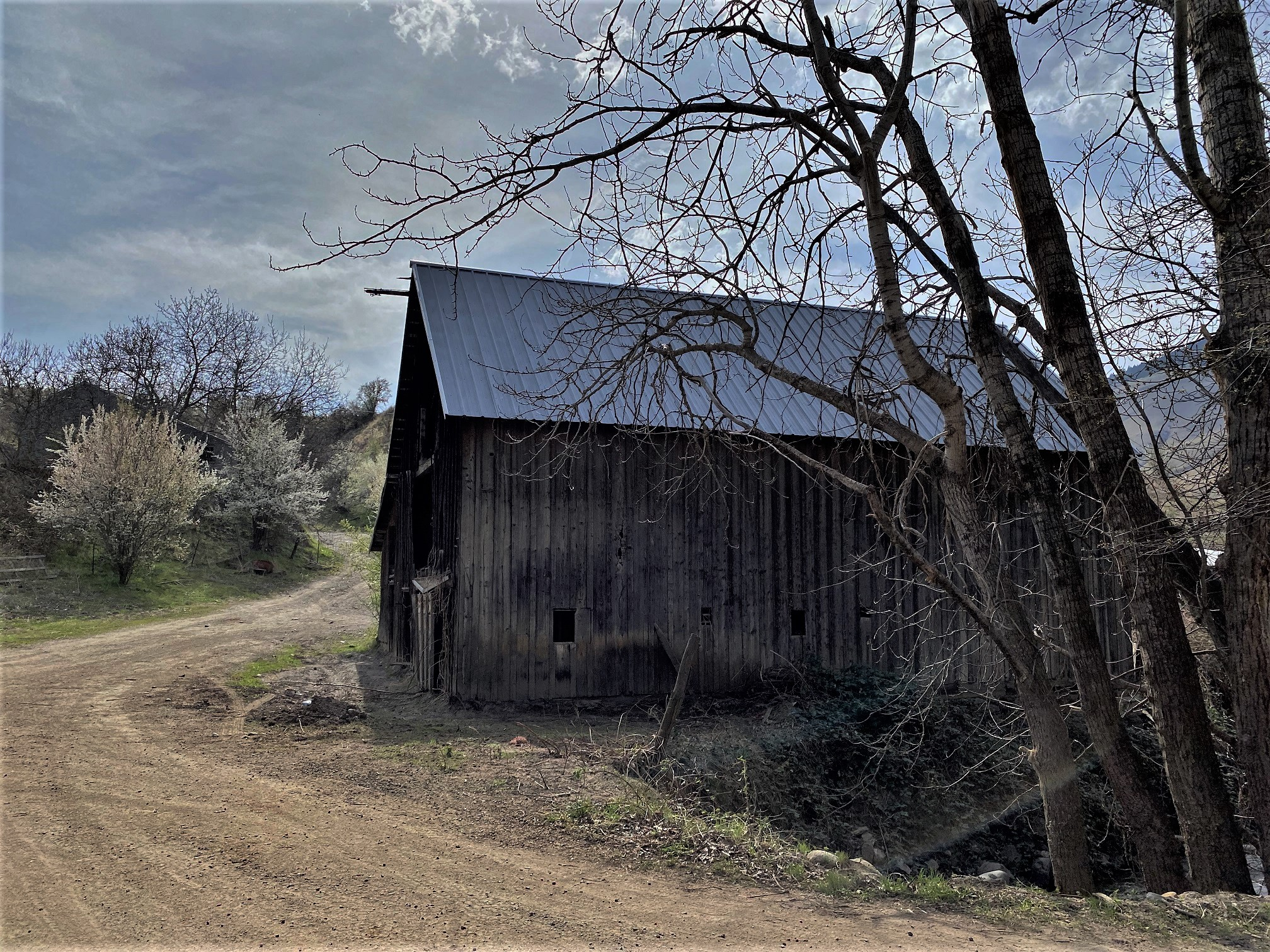

- Location within Idaho Location within the United States
- Location: On U.S. Highway 95 at the mouth of John Day Creek
- Nearest city: Lucile, Idaho
- Coordinates: 45°34′59″N 116°17′15″W
- Area: 53 acres (21 ha)
- NRHP reference No.: 07000544
- Added to NRHP: June 7, 2007

The Jurden Henry Elfers Barn and Field is a historic site located on the south bank of John Day Creek, .33 miles (0.53 km) east of U.S. Route 95 and north of Lucile, Idaho. The barn and field were the site of a raid by members of the Nez Perce tribe in 1877. White settlers had forced the Nez Perce to live on a reservation at Lapwai, and a group of young men from the tribe sought revenge against the settlers. The men raided several sites along the Salmon River, including the Elfers' ranch. During their raid on the ranch, the Nez Perce killed Jurden Henry Elfers, his nephew Henry "Harry" Burn Beckrodge, and hired worker Robert Bland, who were working at the barn and field at the time. The men also stole several horses and a rifle from the property. The raid was one of the main causes of the Nez Perce War, as soldiers at Fort Lapwai responded to the raids by attacking Chief Joseph's camp. The barn and field are one of the few surviving sites connected to the events leading to the start of the war.

The site was added to the National Register of Historic Places on June 7, 2007.
