= Aitken Barn =

- U.S. National Register of Historic Places
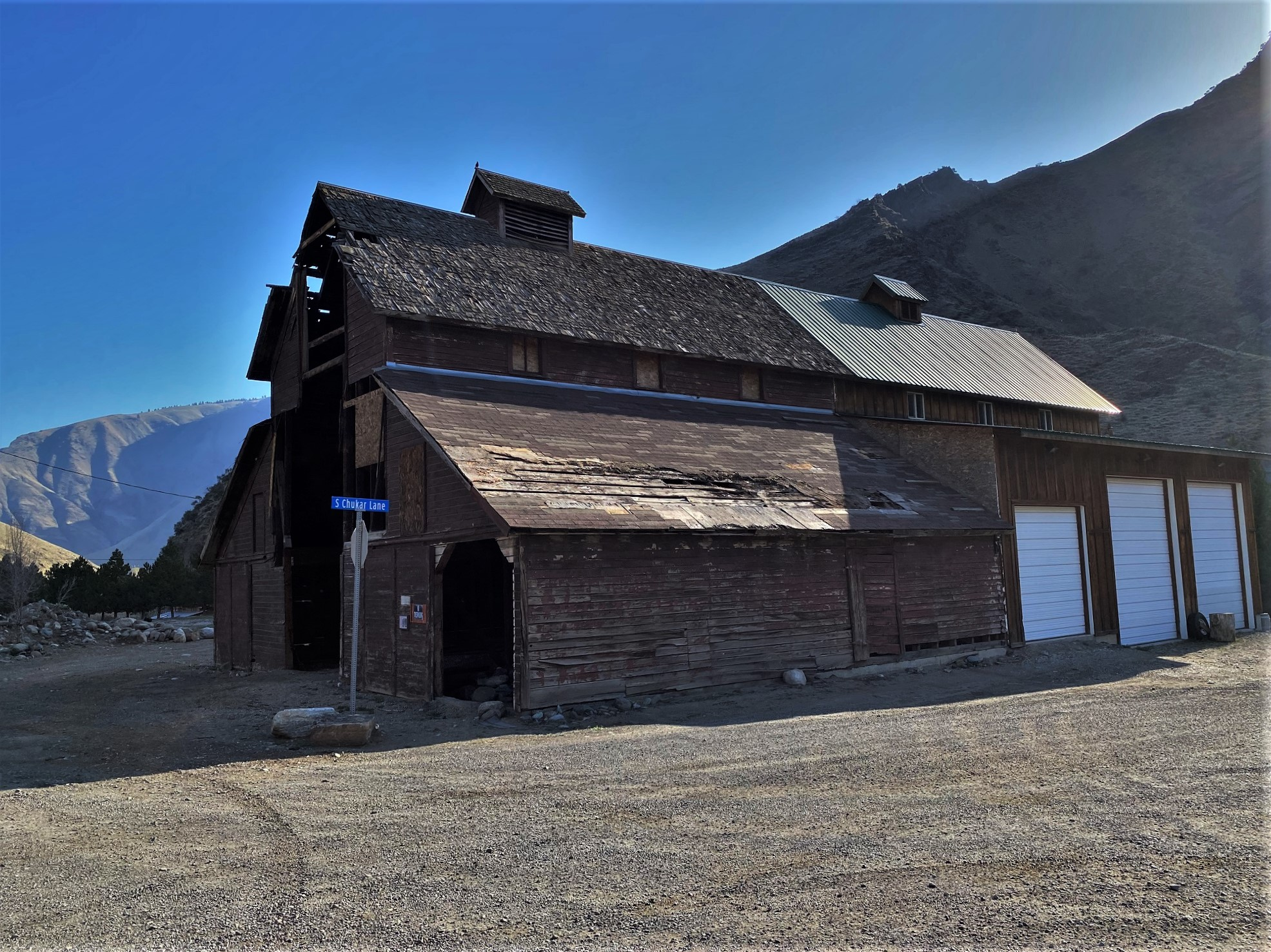

- Location within Idaho Location within the United States
- Location: Southwest of Riggins, Idaho on U.S. Route 95
- Coordinates: 45°24′29″N 116°19′44″W
- Area: less than one acre
- Built: 1914
- Built by: Jim Aitken; Stewart Aitken
- NRHP reference No.: 82002512
- Added to NRHP: August 9, 1982

The Aitken Barn on the Little Salmon River prominently visible from the U.S. Highway 95 near Riggins in Idaho County, Idaho was built in 1914. It was listed on the National Register of Historic Places in 1982.

== Description ==
It was built by Jim and Stewart Aitken. It is a balloon-frame "basilica plan" building, with one-story lean-tos on both sides of a two-story central section. The central section has a hip roof to the rear. There is a clerestory wall of the hayloft with three square small windows. The lean-to sections have stalls for horses and dairy cows.
