= Yawwinma Traditional Cultural Property =

Historic cultural property in Idaho, United States

- U.S. National Register of Historic Places
- U.S. Historic district
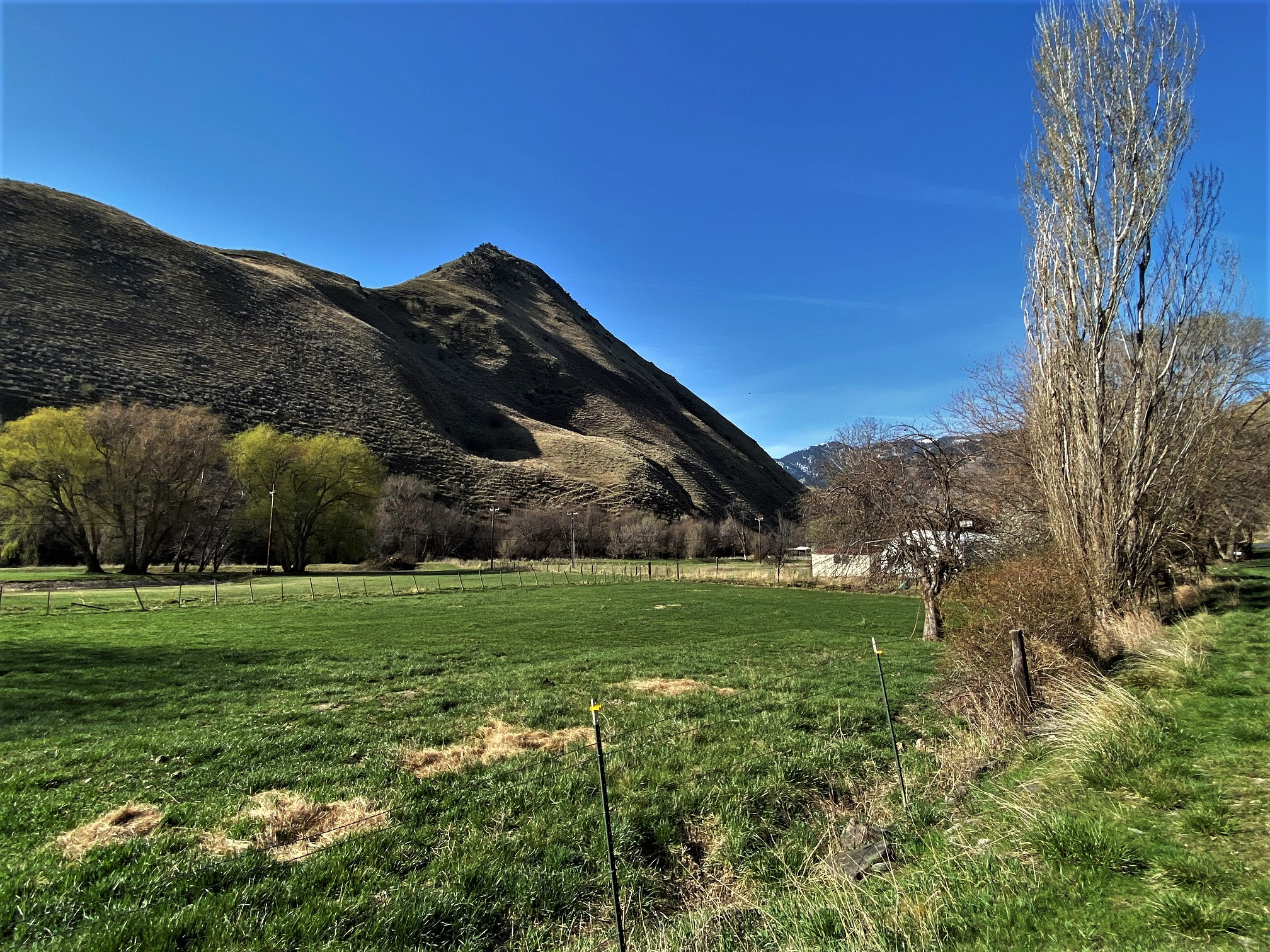
- Location: 143 Rapid River Rd., Riggins, Idaho vicinity
- NRHP reference No.: 100001053
- Added to NRHP: 2017

The Yawwinma Traditional Cultural Property was listed on the National Register of Historic Places in 2017. A draft nomination for the listing included the statement "For some Nez Perce, Rapid River is the only place they get to fish."

A WordPress review comments:

Of course, tribal members continue to fish the Clearwater, the Columbia, the Lochsa, the Selway, the Imnaha, the Grand Ronde, the Snake, and their tributaries, but the proximity of Yáwwinma, the relatively small size of the river, and the comparatively large number of returning hatchery fish each year make Rapid River arguably the most important salmon stream for noncommercial Nez Perce fishermen and their families who depend on it as a ceremonial and subsistence fishery. The river and the grounds of Rapid River House (one of the two lots included in the listing) now literally belong to the Nez Perce Tribe, but traditional Nez Perce people would say just the opposite: we belong to Yáwwinma.

and

Also, the other listed lot owned by the Tribe is called "Barter Town". Per pages 43-44, "According to Nez Perce fishermen, this contemporary place name also makes a direct allusion to the place of the same name in the 1985 postapocalyptic film Mad Max Beyond Thunderdome, starring Mel Gibson and Tina Turner. In addition to being a descriptive name, Barter Town is also a prime example of Nez Perce humor and the dynamic vitality of the Nez Perce oral tradition."

Additional documentation about the property was added to the National Register in September 2017.
