= Butts Creek Point Fire Lookout =

- U.S. National Register of Historic Places
- Location within Idaho
- Nearest city: Salmon, Idaho
- Coordinates: 45°21′42″N 114°44′15″W
- Area: 10 acres (4.0 ha)
- Built: 1933
- Built by: USDA Forest Service
- NRHP reference No.: 100002786
- Added to NRHP: December 28, 2018

The Butts Creek Point Fire Lookout, in Idaho County, Idaho, was listed on the National Register of Historic Places in 2018.

It is located at Butts Creek Point, about 40 miles (64 km) northeast of Salmon, in the Frank Church River of No Return Wilderness.

According to the Challis newspaper, it is located "at 7,836 feet elevation on a prominent knob surrounded by a forest of mixed lodgepole pine and fir with an understory of native grasses rooted in decomposed granite soils, forest Public Affairs Officer Amy Baumer said." "The lookout has four glass walls that provide a 360-degree view of some of the most remote landscapes in the lower 48. People can see the Clearwater Mountains, the Bitterroot Mountains, the Bighorn Crags and the Salmon River Mountains from the lookout."

The tower was built from a kit taken to the site by a 10 mule string, and has a 14 by 14 feet (4.3 m × 4.3 m) cab. It was in service from 1933 to 1982.
