= Chi–Sandra Garden =

- U.S. National Register of Historic Places
- Location within Idaho Location within the United States
- Nearest city: long China Creek near its confluence with the South Fork of the Salmon River in the Payette National Forest, Idaho
- Coordinates: 45°12′52″N 115°33′50″W
- NRHP reference No.: 90000892
- Added to NRHP: June 27, 1990

Chi–Sandra Garden, also known as 10IH1779, is a garden located within Payette National Forest in Idaho, United States. The garden was established by the Chinese American community to feed migrant laborers who worked in the mines. There are three other Chinese-American gardens in the Warren Mining District.

The garden was listed on the National Register of Historic Places on June 27, 1990.

== See also ==
- History of Chinese Americans in Idaho
- National Register of Historic Places listings in Idaho County, Idaho
