= Moose Creek Administrative Site =

- U.S. National Register of Historic Places
- U.S. Historic district
- Location within Idaho Location within the United States
- Location: Eastern side of Moose Creek, south of Whistling Pig Creek, in the Nez Perce National Forest, near Grangeville in Idaho County, Idaho
- Coordinates: 46.111111°N 114.920833°W
- Area: 160 acres (0.65 km^{2})
- Architect: Jack Parsell
- Architectural style: USFS rustic architecture
- NRHP reference No.: 90000932
- Added to NRHP: June 25, 1990

The Moose Creek Administrative Site, in the vicinity of Grangeville, Idaho, was listed on the National Register of Historic Places in 1990.

It is located at the confluence of the Selway River and Moose Creek in the Selway-Bitterroot Wilderness. The listing included nine contributing buildings and one other contributing structure.
