= Big Cedar School =

- U.S. National Register of Historic Places
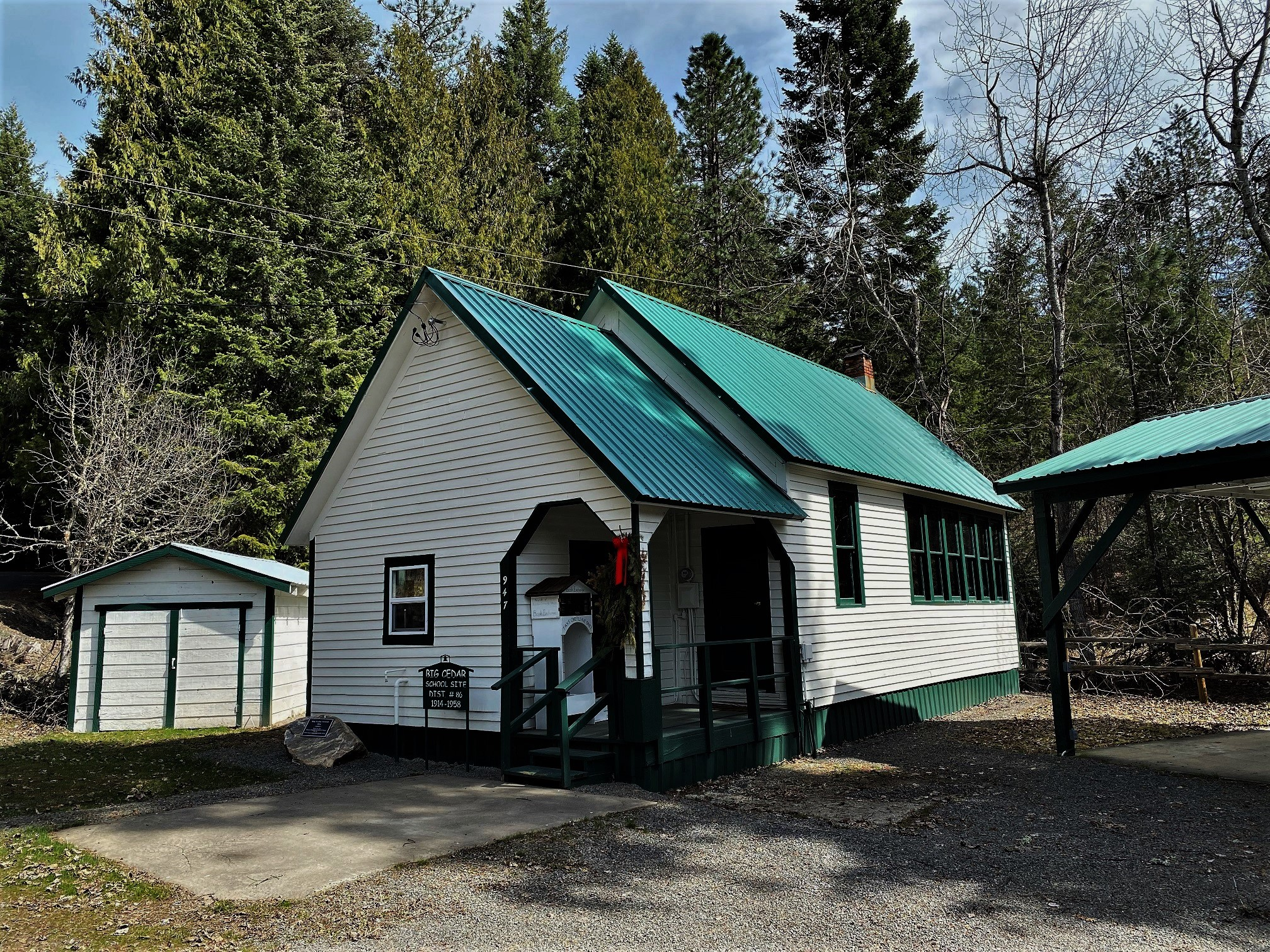

- Location within Idaho Location within the United States
- Location: 947 Red Fir Rd, about 7 miles (11 km) from Kooskia, Idaho
- Coordinates: 46.097790°N 115.852185°W
- MPS: Public School Buildings in Idaho
- NRHP reference No.: 16000806
- Added to NRHP: November 29, 2016

The Big Cedar School is a historic schoolhouse near Kooskia in Idaho County, Idaho. It was listed on the National Register of Historic Places in 2016.
