= Warren Creek =

Stream in South Dakota, U.S.

Coordinates: 45°04′47″N 103°13′35″W

Warren Creek is a stream in the U.S. state of South Dakota.

Warren Creek has the name of a pioneer trapper.

== See also ==
- List of rivers of South Dakota
