= Dr. Wilson Foskett Home and Drugstore =

Historic house in Idaho, United States

- U.S. National Register of Historic Places
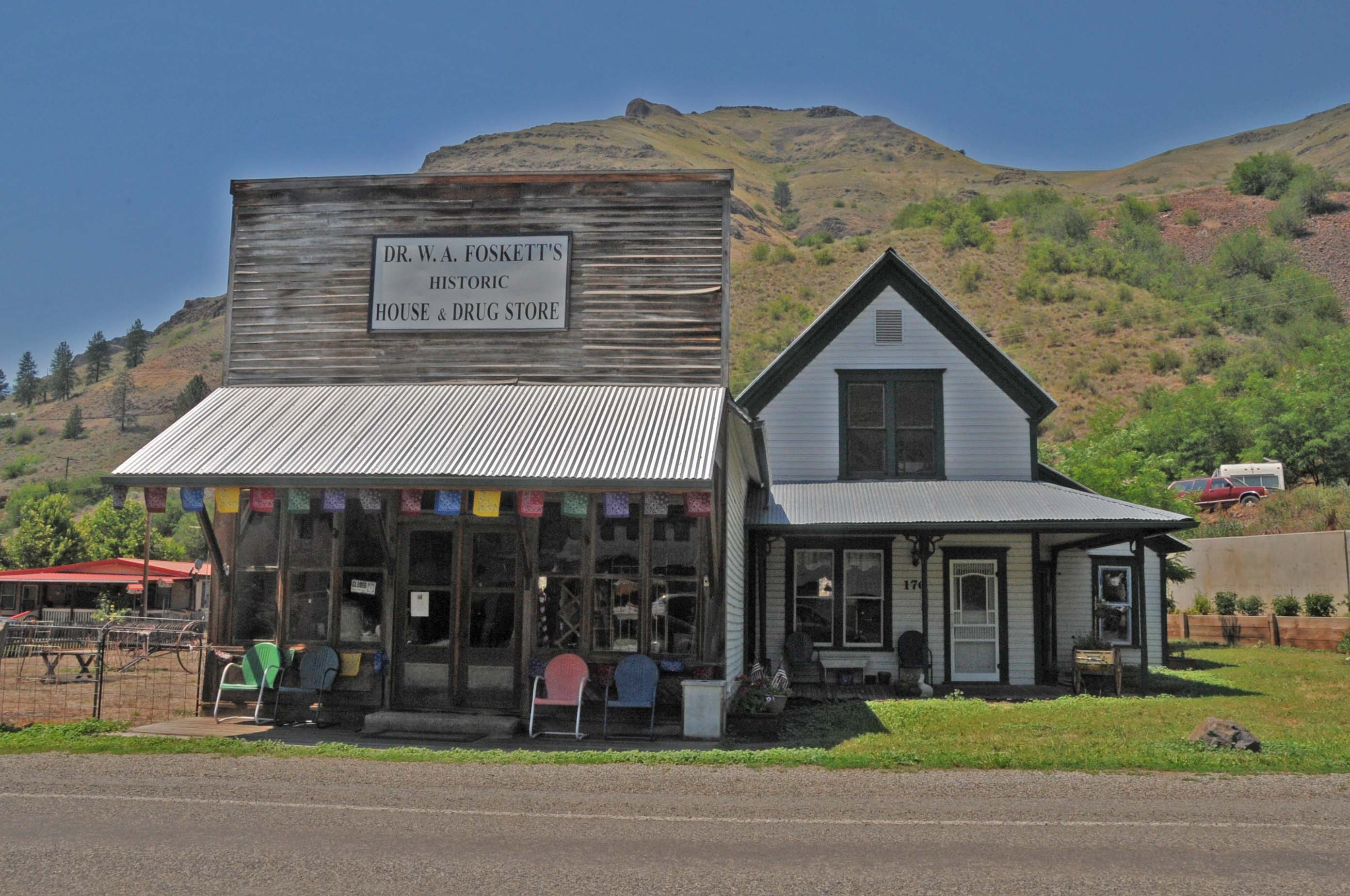

- Location within Idaho Location within the United States
- Location: West side of River Rd., White Bird, Idaho
- Coordinates: 45°45′44″N 116°18′1″W
- Area: less than one acre
- Built: 1902, c.1914-18; c.1910-14
- Architectural style: Queen Anne; One-part commercial block
- NRHP reference No.: 05000337
- Added to NRHP: April 26, 2005

The Dr. Wilson Foskett Home and Drugstore are a house and commercial building located on the west side of River Rd. in White Bird, Idaho. The pair of buildings was listed on the National Register of Historic Places in 2005.

The house, built in 1902, is Queen Anne in style. It was expanded to the rear sometime during 1914–1918. The drugstore building is a one-part commercial block building built between 1910 and 1914. It was located about 70 feet (21 m) to the south of the house, but was moved in 1926 to be adjacent and attached to the house, with a passage cut between the two.

Wilson Abner Foskett married Loris Taylor in November 1902 and moved into the just-completed new home. Foskett became a pharmacist to be able to provide medicines to his patients. Foster died in a car accident in April 1924, likely having fallen asleep while driving, as he returned from delivering a baby at a patient's home.
