= Deep Creek Ranger Station =

- U.S. National Register of Historic Places
- U.S. Historic district
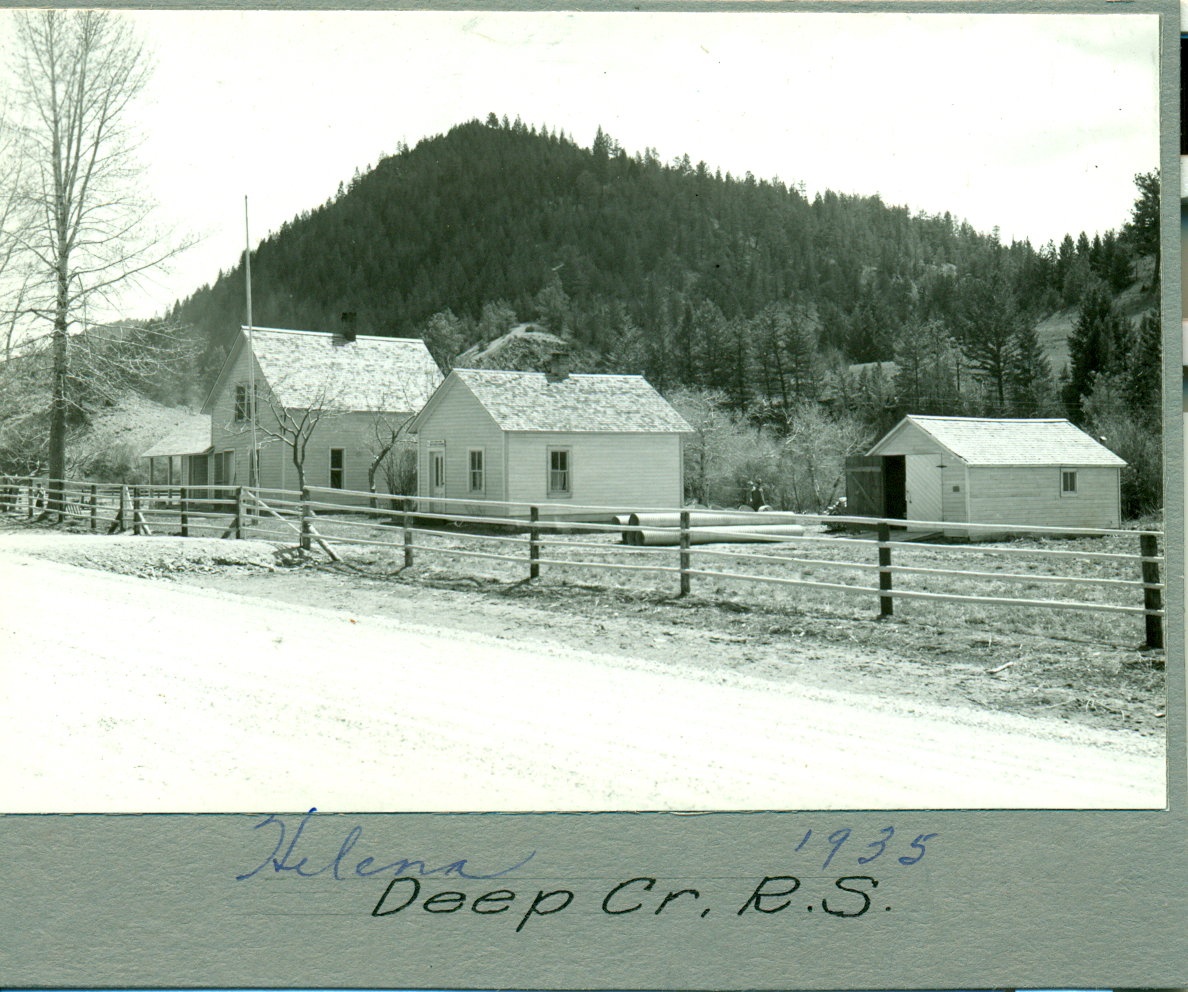
- Deep Creek Ranger Station 1935

- Location within Idaho Location within the United States
- Location: West Fork Ranger District, Bitterroot National Forest, Idaho County, Idaho, in vicinity of Darby, Montana
- Coordinates: 45.704052°N 114.717392°W
- Area: 10 acres (4.0 ha)
- Architectural style: Rustic
- NRHP reference No.: 13000902
- Added to NRHP: December 11, 2013

The Deep Creek Ranger Station in Bitterroot National Forest in Idaho County, Idaho was listed on the National Register of Historic Places. It is in the vicinity of Darby, Montana. It has also been known as Magruder Ranger Station.

It includes a complex of Rustic-style administrative buildings dating from the 1920s through 1940s.
