= Lucile, Idaho =

Unincorporated community in Idaho, United States

- Unincorporated community
- Location within the United States Location within Idaho
- Coordinates: 45°32′07″N 116°18′37″W
- Country: United States
- State: Idaho
- County: Idaho
- Elevation: 1,650 ft (500 m)
- Time zone: UTC-8 (Pacific (PST))
  - Summer (DST): UTC-7 (PDT)
- ZIP code: 83542
- Area codes: 208, 986
- GNIS feature ID: 396827

Lucile is an unincorporated community in Idaho County, in the U.S. state of Idaho. The community lies on the east bank of the Salmon River along U.S. Route 95, about 8 miles (13 km) north of Riggins. Lucile has a United States Postal Service post office with ZIP code 83542.

== Geography ==
Lucile is situated in the Salmon River canyon in western Idaho County. The community sits at an elevation of approximately 1,650 feet (500 m) above sea level. The area is characterized by steep canyon walls and riverine terrain typical of the Salmon River corridor.

== History ==
The Salmon River canyon near Lucile was part of the traditional homelands of the Nez Perce (Nimiipuu) people. Euro-American homesteaders and miners established ranches and ferries along the corridor in the late 19th century.

A post office was established under the spelling Lucille on February 24, 1899, with George Curtis recorded as the first postmaster in county postal transcriptions. The spelling was later standardized to Lucile. The post office remains in operation today, serving ZIP code 83542.

By the early 20th century, Lucile functioned as a small river community, serving ranchers, fishermen, and travelers along the Salmon River. Its location on what is now U.S. Route 95 made it an intermediate stop between larger communities such as Riggins and White Bird.

The name also appears in scientific usage: the Lucile series (also called Lucile Slate) was named in early 20th-century geological reports for exposures near the community, particularly along the canyon walls of the Salmon River.

The precise origin of the community’s name—whether it was named after a local settler, postmaster’s family member, or another individual—remains unclear in digitized records. Local archives such as the Idaho County Historical Society and Idaho State Historical Society may hold oral histories or manuscripts that explain who “Lucile” was.

== Geology ==
The name Lucile is used in regional geologic literature: the Lucile series is a metamorphic rock unit named for its occurrence near Lucile, Idaho. Geologic references describe the Lucile series as occurring in the canyon walls of the Salmon River from Lucile downstream to the Riggins area.

== Services ==
Lucile maintains a postal facility serving ZIP code 83542; the post office is located at 106 Cow Creek Road, Lucile, ID.

== Climate ==
The climate in this area has mild differences between highs and lows, and there is adequate rainfall year-round. According to the Köppen Climate Classification system, Lucile has a marine west coast climate, abbreviated "Cfb" on climate maps.
