= Shoup, Idaho =

Unincorporated community in the state of Idaho, United States

- Unincorporated community
- Location within Idaho Location within the United States
- Coordinates: 45°22′37″N 114°16′37″W
- Country: United States
- State: Idaho
- County: Lemhi
- Elevation: 3,389 ft (1,033 m)

Population (2010)
  - Total: 25
- Time zone: UTC-7 (Mountain (MST))
  - Summer (DST): UTC-6 (MDT)
- ZIP code: 83469
- Area codes: 208, 986
- GNIS feature ID: 398126

Shoup is an unincorporated community in Lemhi County, Idaho, United States. Shoup has a population of 25. Shoup is located on the Salmon River 23 miles (37 km) northwest of Salmon. Shoup has a post office with ZIP code 83469.

Shoup was named for George L. Shoup, first governor of Idaho.
