= Darby, Idaho =

Unincorporated community in the state of Idaho, United States

Coordinates: 43°41′39″N 111°03′58″W

Darby is an unincorporated community in Teton County, in the U.S. state of Idaho.

== History ==
According to B. W. Driggs' History of Teton Valley, the community's name originates with Jim Darby, a drifter who built a shelter near a stream in the area in 1882. The stream had recently been named Goodfellow Creek by a survey crew led by USGS surveyor F. V. Hayden, after the expedition's cook, but local residents unfamiliar with that name began calling it Darby Creek instead, after the newcomer, and the name spread to the surrounding area. Contemporaries described Darby as an unusual figure with no apparent occupation, and some suspected he was using an assumed name, possibly as a fugitive from the law; he left the area before winter and was not seen again. The area was later settled further by Mormon pioneers, who built a school, a church, and a cemetery there.

A post office called Darby was established in 1900, and remained in operation until 1902. According to tradition, Darby was named after a pioneer settler.

On July 5, 1911, a shooting took place at Darby when Ellington Smith killed David S. Neal, a neighbor, in a dispute reportedly stemming from Smith's belief that Neal had misused water Smith considered his own. Smith was convicted and sentenced to life imprisonment at the Idaho State Penitentiary in Boise, where he died after serving about ten years.

Darby's population was 9 in 1960.
