= Riggins, Idaho =

- City
- Motto: "Idaho's Whitewater Capital"
- Location of Riggins in Idaho County, Idaho.
- Coordinates: 45°25′13″N 116°19′04″W
- Country: United States
- State: Idaho
- County: Idaho

Area
  - Total: 0.44 sq mi (1.15 km^{2})
  - Land: 0.40 sq mi (1.03 km^{2})
  - Water: 0.046 sq mi (0.12 km^{2})
- Elevation: 1,837 ft (560 m)

Population (2020)
  - Total: 372
  - Density: 935/sq mi (361/km^{2})
- Time zone: UTC-7 (Mountain)
  - Summer (DST): UTC-6 (Mountain)
- ZIP code: 83549
- Area code: 208
- FIPS code: 16-67870
- GNIS feature ID: 2410949
- Website: www.rigginsidaho.org

Riggins is a city in the western United States in Idaho County, Idaho. Nestled deep in a canyon at the confluence of the Salmon and Little Salmon rivers in west central Idaho, it is approximately 150 highway miles (240 km) north of Boise, and 120 highway miles (190 km) south-southeast of Lewiston. The elevation is 1,821 feet (555 m) above sea level, and its population was 372 at the 2020 census.

U.S. Route 95, the only highway for the state connecting the Panhandle to the south, runs through Riggins as Main Street. Along this route, Riggins is the most northwestern town in the Mountain time zone; Pacific time begins just north of the city, across the Salmon River.

== History ==
Riggins was named for Richard L. Riggins, local businessman and postmaster, and for his father, Fred Riggins, who carried the mail to the area for years.

A sawmill was formerly operated in Riggins, until an explosion and fire in 1982.

== Geography ==
According to the United States Census Bureau, the city has a total area of 0.45 square miles (1.17 km^{2}), of which, 0.43 square miles (1.11 km^{2}) is land and 0.02 square miles (0.05 km^{2}) is water.

=== Climate ===
According to the Köppen climate classification system, Riggins qualifies as having a humid subtropical climate (Köppen Cfa), a climate type quite atypical for the region. However, due to cold winter months, Riggins's climate nearly qualifies as a dry, hot summer humid continental climate (Köppen Dsa).

Climate data for Riggins (1896-2012)
| Month | Jan | Feb | Mar | Apr | May | Jun | Jul | Aug | Sep | Oct | Nov | Dec | Year |
|---|---|---|---|---|---|---|---|---|---|---|---|---|---|
| Record high °F (°C) | 64 (18) | 72 (22) | 83 (28) | 95 (35) | 103 (39) | 108 (42) | 113 (45) | 115 (46) | 110 (43) | 95 (35) | 80 (27) | 69 (21) | 115 (46) |
| Mean daily maximum °F (°C) | 41.8 (5.4) | 48.9 (9.4) | 56.5 (13.6) | 65.3 (18.5) | 73.4 (23.0) | 80.8 (27.1) | 92.2 (33.4) | 91.7 (33.2) | 80.9 (27.2) | 66.9 (19.4) | 51.2 (10.7) | 42.5 (5.8) | 66 (19) |
| Mean daily minimum °F (°C) | 27.8 (−2.3) | 30.6 (−0.8) | 34.2 (1.2) | 39.1 (3.9) | 45.3 (7.4) | 51.5 (10.8) | 57.5 (14.2) | 56.9 (13.8) | 49.6 (9.8) | 41.1 (5.1) | 34.3 (1.3) | 29.1 (−1.6) | 41.4 (5.2) |
| Record low °F (°C) | −10 (−23) | −12 (−24) | 3 (−16) | 18 (−8) | 25 (−4) | 22 (−6) | 36 (2) | 36 (2) | 20 (−7) | 16 (−9) | −13 (−25) | −8 (−22) | −13 (−25) |
| Average precipitation inches (mm) | 1.12 (28) | 1.13 (29) | 1.61 (41) | 1.68 (43) | 2.12 (54) | 1.83 (46) | 0.72 (18) | 0.74 (19) | 1.07 (27) | 1.29 (33) | 1.39 (35) | 1.33 (34) | 16.04 (407) |
| Average snowfall inches (cm) | 2.8 (7.1) | 1.6 (4.1) | 0.7 (1.8) | 0.1 (0.25) | 0 (0) | 0 (0) | 0 (0) | 0 (0) | 0 (0) | 0 (0) | 0.4 (1.0) | 2.2 (5.6) | 7.9 (20) |
| Average precipitation days | 8 | 8 | 10 | 10 | 10 | 9 | 4 | 4 | 5 | 7 | 9 | 9 | 93 |
Source: WRCC

== Demographics ==
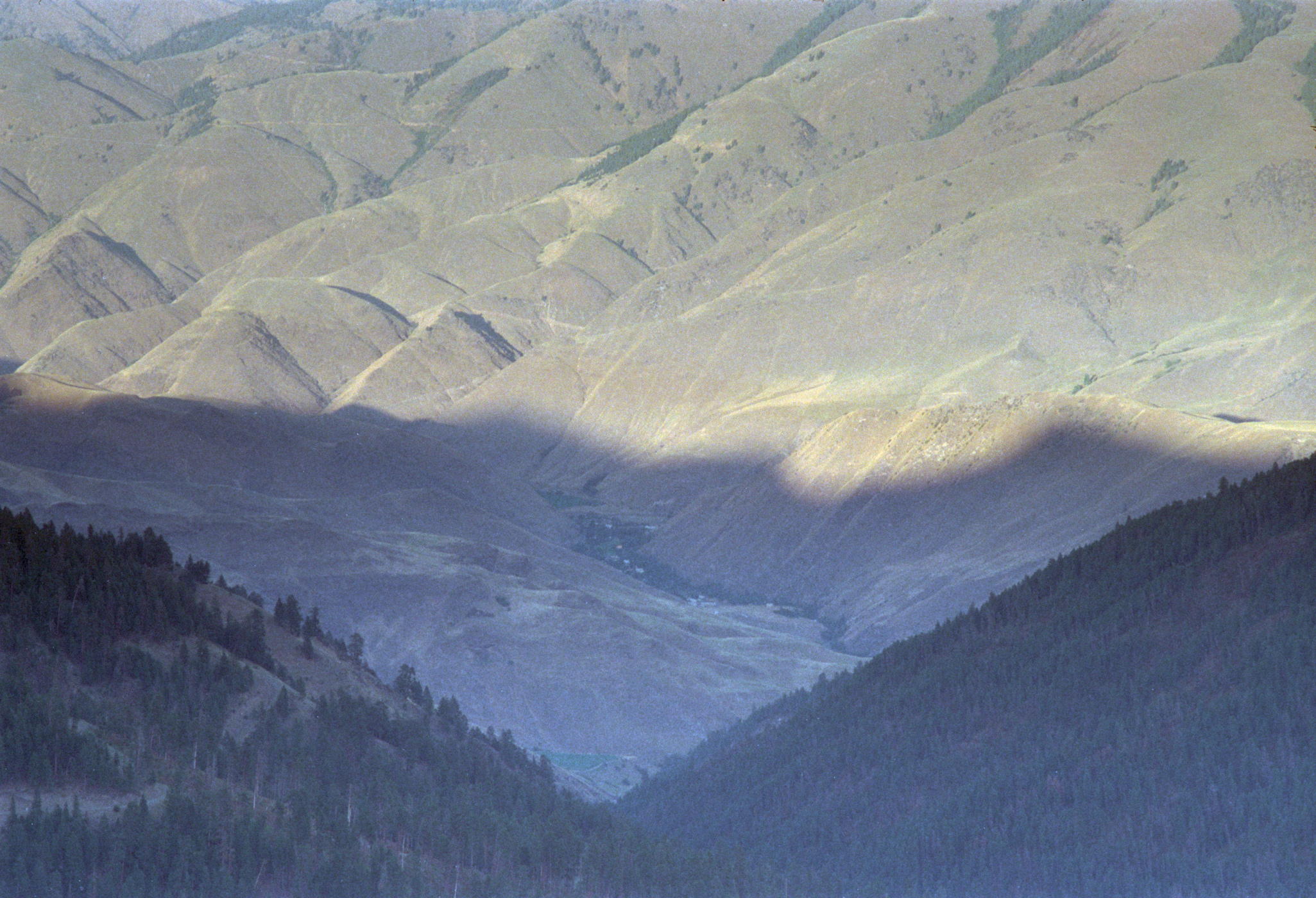
Riggins from above

Historical population
| Census | Pop. | Note | %± |
|---|---|---|---|
| 1910 | 60 | | — |
| 1920 | 60 | | 0.0% |
| 1930 | 66 | | 10.0% |
| 1940 | 150 | | 127.3% |
| 1950 | 287 | | 91.3% |
| 1960 | 588 | | 104.9% |
| 1970 | 533 | | −9.4% |
| 1980 | 527 | | −1.1% |
| 1990 | 443 | | −15.9% |
| 2000 | 410 | | −7.4% |
| 2010 | 419 | | 2.2% |
| 2020 | 372 | | −11.2% |
U.S. Decennial Census

=== 2010 census ===
As of the census of 2010, there were 419 people, 239 households, and 116 families residing in the city. The population density was 974.4 inhabitants per square mile (376.2/km^{2}). There were 306 housing units at an average density of 711.6 per square mile (274.8/km^{2}). The racial makeup of the city was 96.9% White, 0.7% Native American, 1.4% from other races, and 1.0% from two or more races. Hispanic or Latino of any race were 1.7% of the population.

There were 239 households, of which 13.8% had children under the age of 18 living with them, 34.3% were married couples living together, 9.6% had a female householder with no husband present, 4.6% had a male householder with no wife present, and 51.5% were non-families. 46.0% of all households were made up of individuals, and 19.6% had someone living alone who was 65 years of age or older. The average household size was 1.75 and the average family size was 2.33.

The median age in the city was 53.3 years. 12.6% of residents were under the age of 18; 6.2% were between the ages of 18 and 24; 16.8% were from 25 to 44; 35.4% were from 45 to 64; and 29.1% were 65 years of age or older. The gender makeup of the city was 51.1% male and 48.9% female.

=== 2000 census ===
As of the census of 2000, there were 410 people, 204 households, and 111 families residing in the city. The population density was 1,361.3 inhabitants per square mile (525.6/km^{2}). There were 253 housing units at an average density of 840.0 per square mile (324.3/km^{2}). The racial makeup of the city was 98.29% White, 0.49% Native American, 0.24% from other races, and 0.98% from two or more races.

There were 204 households, out of which 15.7% had children under the age of 18 living with them, 45.1% were married couples living together, 6.9% had a female householder with no husband present, and 45.1% were non-families. 39.2% of all households were made up of individuals, and 23.5% had someone living alone who was 65 years of age or older. The average household size was 2.01 and the average family size was 2.64.

In the city, the population was spread out, with 17.6% under the age of 18, 3.2% from 18 to 24, 18.5% from 25 to 44, 33.2% from 45 to 64, and 27.6% who were 65 years of age or older. The median age was 52 years. For every 100 females, there were 100.0 males. For every 100 females age 18 and over, there were 101.2 males.

The median income for a household in the city was $20,972, and the median income for a family was $30,000. Males had a median income of $27,361 versus $16,250 for females. The per capita income for the city was $17,330. About 19.2% of families and 25.3% of the population were below the poverty line, including 50.0% of those under age 18 and 9.5% of those age 65 or over.

== Arts and culture ==
The Riggins Rodeo in early May can be viewed from the grandstands or from the hillside overlooking the arena. Riggins also has an annual event labeled "Hot Summer Nights" which is a two-day music festival and talent show.

== Parks and recreation ==
Riggins is a hub for outdoor adventures in North Central Idaho. Rafting, kayaking, fishing, and hunting are available and campgrounds surround the area, allowing access to view the scenery and wildlife. Visitors can pan for gold in the river gravel, and guides and outfitters can provide assistance.

The Seven Devils Mountains and the Hells Canyon National Recreation Area are just a few miles southwest of town; the Frank Church–River of No Return Wilderness is nearby to the east, upstream on the Salmon River.

== Notable people ==
- Dan Cummins, comedian
- Leighton Vander Esch, NFL linebacker for the Dallas Cowboys
- Paul Shepherd, member of the Idaho House of Representatives
