= Nez Perce National Forest =

National forest in Oregon, Idaho, and Montana, U.S.

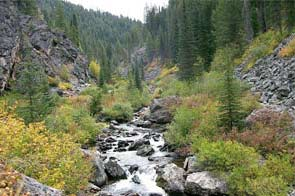
- Crooked Creek in Gospel Hump Wilderness

- Location within the United States
- Location: Idaho County, Idaho, U.S.
- Nearest city: Grangeville, Idaho
- Coordinates: 45°27′N 115°55′W
- Area: 2,224,091 acres (9,000.58 km^{2})
- Established: July 1, 1908
- Governing body: U.S. Forest Service
- Website: www.fs.usda.gov/nezperceclearwater

The Nez Perce National Forest is a 4,000,000-acre (16,000 km^{2}) United States National Forest located in west-central Idaho. The forest is bounded on the east by the state of Montana, on the north by the Clearwater National Forest, on the west by a portion of the Wallowa–Whitman National Forest and on the south by the Payette National Forest.

The mountains in this forest provide wildlife habitat for timber wolf, raccoon, moose, black bear, coyote, cougar, elk, two species of fox, bald eagle, pika, beaver, flammulated owl, pine marten, white-tailed and mule deer, muskrat, river otter, peregrine falcon, mink, marmot, fisher, and mountain goat.

== History ==
The Nez Perce National Forest was established on July 1, 1908, by the U.S. Forest Service with 1,946,340 acres (7,876.6 km^{2}) from parts of Bitterroot National Forest and Weiser National Forest. On October 29, 1934, part of Selway National Forest was added.

In 2012, Nez Perce National Forest and Clearwater National Forest were administratively combined as Nez Perce-Clearwater National Forests, with headquarters in Kamiah, Idaho. There are local ranger district offices in Elk City, Grangeville, Kooskia, and White Bird.

In 2018, the Penman Mine in Nez Perce served as a filming location for Discovery Channel's Gold Rush. During this filming, on October 5, 2018, Raw TV production staff member Terrance Woods Jr. (27) was reported as missing, as was Connie Johnson (76), a cook for Richie Outfitters last seen October 2. Johnson's border collie, Ace, was recovered alive at the Moose Creek ranger station three weeks later, but as of 2022, neither Johnson nor Woods have been found.

== Wilderness areas ==
There are four officially designated wilderness areas within Nez Perce National Forest that are part of the National Wilderness Preservation System. Three of these are partly or mostly in neighboring National Forests (as indicated).

- Frank Church—River of No Return Wilderness (only 4.68% lies within Nez Perce NF; mostly in either Payette National Forest, Challis NF, Salmon NF, Boise NF, or Bitterroot NF)
- Gospel Hump Wilderness
- Hells Canyon Wilderness (mostly in Wallowa National Forest; partly in Payette National Forest, Whitman National Forest, or BLM land)
- Selway-Bitterroot Wilderness (partly in Bitterroot NF; Clearwater National Forest; Lolo NF)

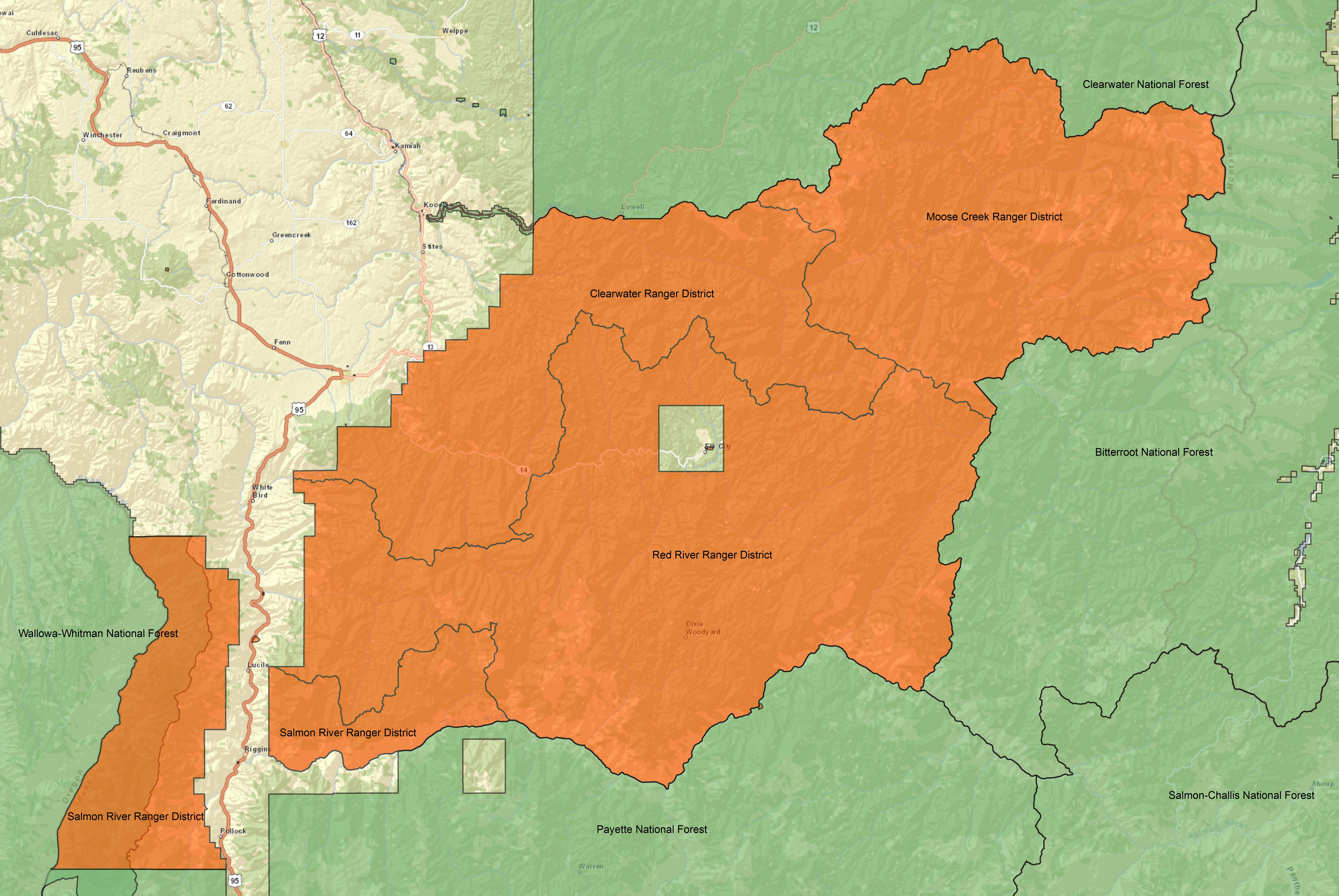
A map of Nez Perce National Forest (orange).

== See also ==
- Nez Perce tribe
- List of national forests of the United States
