= Warren, Idaho =

Unincorporated community in Idaho, United States

Warren, Idaho Warren's Camp, Warren's, Warrens
- Unincorporated settlement
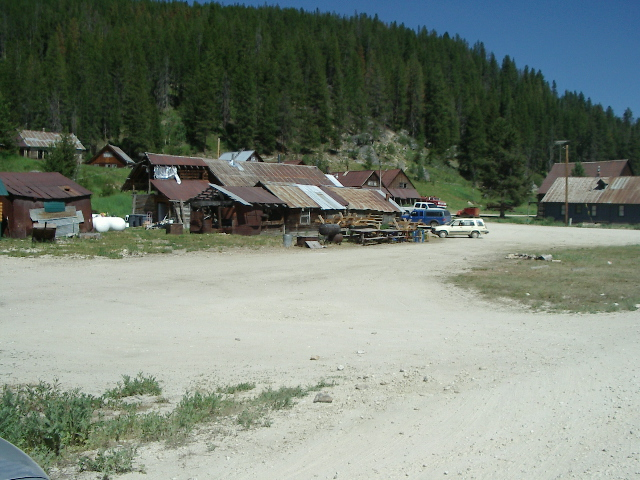
- Downtown Warren, July 2008

- Location within Idaho Location within the United States
- Coordinates: 45°15′51″N 115°40′35″W
- Country: United States
- State: Idaho
- County: Idaho
- Elevation: 5,906 ft (1,800 m)
- Time zone: UTC-7 (Mountain (MST))
  - Summer (DST): UTC-6 (MDT)
- ZIP code: 83671
- Area codes: 208, 986
- GNIS feature ID: 392902

Warren is an unincorporated community in the remote north central region of the U.S. state of Idaho, near the Frank Church River of No Return Wilderness.

== Geography ==
Located within the Payette National Forest in southern Idaho County, Warren is northeast of McCall, approximately 50 miles (80 km) by vehicle and about 30 miles (50 km) by air. South of the Salmon River, the elevation is 5,906 feet (1,800 m) above sea level.

== Climate ==
According to the Köppen climate classification system, Warren has a subarctic climate (Köppen Dfc).

Climate data for Warren, Idaho 1991–2020 normals, 1895-2020 extremes: 5907ft (1800m)
Month	Jan	Feb	Mar	Apr	May	Jun	Jul	Aug	Sep	Oct	Nov	Dec	Year
Record high °F (°C)	58 (14)	62 (17)	70 (21)	80 (27)	90 (32)	92 (33)	98 (37)	100 (38)	90 (32)	82 (28)	69 (21)	55 (13)	100 (38)
Mean maximum °F (°C)	47.2 (8.4)	51.6 (10.9)	58.5 (14.7)	64.6 (18.1)	75.3 (24.1)	81.9 (27.7)	89.8 (32.1)	88.0 (31.1)	83.2 (28.4)	73.3 (22.9)	55.9 (13.3)	44.1 (6.7)	90.8 (32.7)
Mean daily maximum °F (°C)	35.0 (1.7)	40.8 (4.9)	45.7 (7.6)	49.8 (9.9)	59.3 (15.2)	68.1 (20.1)	79.2 (26.2)	78.9 (26.1)	69.2 (20.7)	56.0 (13.3)	41.2 (5.1)	34.1 (1.2)	54.8 (12.7)
Daily mean °F (°C)	21.1 (−6.1)	24.0 (−4.4)	31.5 (−0.3)	35.1 (1.7)	43.3 (6.3)	51.1 (10.6)	58.0 (14.4)	56.9 (13.8)	49.4 (9.7)	39.4 (4.1)	28.7 (−1.8)	21.6 (−5.8)	38.3 (3.5)
Mean daily minimum °F (°C)	7.1 (−13.8)	7.3 (−13.7)	17.2 (−8.2)	20.3 (−6.5)	27.3 (−2.6)	34.0 (1.1)	36.8 (2.7)	34.8 (1.6)	29.6 (−1.3)	22.8 (−5.1)	16.2 (−8.8)	9.1 (−12.7)	21.9 (−5.6)
Mean minimum °F (°C)	−17.0 (−27.2)	−15.4 (−26.3)	−5.7 (−20.9)	5.4 (−14.8)	15.2 (−9.3)	24.0 (−4.4)	26.7 (−2.9)	25.0 (−3.9)	19.4 (−7.0)	8.2 (−13.2)	−7.4 (−21.9)	−14.4 (−25.8)	−24.9 (−31.6)
Record low °F (°C)	−44 (−42)	−48 (−44)	−31 (−35)	−11 (−24)	2 (−17)	17 (−8)	19 (−7)	14 (−10)	5 (−15)	−12 (−24)	−38 (−39)	−45 (−43)	−48 (−44)
Average precipitation inches (mm)	2.27 (58)	1.56 (40)	2.18 (55)	2.05 (52)	2.50 (64)	2.76 (70)	1.14 (29)	1.03 (26)	1.32 (34)	2.03 (52)	2.85 (72)	2.39 (61)	24.08 (613)
Average snowfall inches (cm)	24.0 (61)	17.8 (45)	17.3 (44)	10.1 (26)	4.1 (10)	0.4 (1.0)	0.0 (0.0)	0.0 (0.0)	0.5 (1.3)	3.0 (7.6)	18.7 (47)	24.9 (63)	120.8 (305.9)
Source 1: NOAA
Source 2: XMACIS2 (1981-2010 snowfall, records & monthly max/mins)

== History ==
Miners from the previous gold strikes in Pierce and Florence fanned out to the south and discovered gold in the Warren Creek area in August 1862. It led to the formation of the settlement, then in Washington Territory, making it one of the oldest settlements in present-day Idaho. With a gold mining boom in multiple regions during the Civil War, the Idaho Territory was established in 1863. Shortly after the gold discovery by Lewiston's James Warren, the Warren's Camp population swelled to over 2,000; the southerners called their area of the camp "Richmond" and northerners called theirs "Washington." Washington was established as the seat of Idaho County from June 1, 1869 until voters in the June 1875 election selected Mount Idaho over Slate Creek and Washington.

After the initial boom ended in 1875, Warren was known for its significant Chinese population.

The boom-town population plummeted when mining declined, but enjoyed a brief renaissance in the 1930s with the introduction of dredge mining in the area. During World War II, gold mining was shut down by the U.S. government in 1942. Following the war, interest in Warren was high for rare-earth metals in its by-product monazite. A modest gold mining industry remains in the area.

The town has been threatened several times by forest fires, most recently in 1989, 2000, and 2007. Recent fires have made the Warren area a haven for morel mushroom hunting.

Warren currently has a full-time population of 12 to 16.

== Population history ==
Historical population
Census	Pop.	Note	%±
1870	542		—
1880	470		−13.3%
1890	113		−76.0%
1900	159		40.7%
1910	100		−37.1%
1920	131		31.0%
1930	180		37.4%
1940	209		16.1%
1950	30		−85.6%
1960	12		−60.0%
1970	30		150.0%
1980	35		16.7%
1990	30		−14.3%

- 1864 census: 521 (509 men, 10 women, 2 children)
- 1863 census: 660

== Additional sources ==
- A History of Warren, Idaho: Mining, Race, and Environment
- "Site Report - Warrens" (PDF). Reference Series, no. 197. ISHS. 1981.
- U.S. Geological Survey Geographic Names Information System: Warren, Idaho
