= Kooskia, Idaho =

- City
- Location of Kooskia in Idaho County, Idaho.
- Coordinates: 46°08′30″N 115°58′35″W
- Country: United States
- State: Idaho
- County: Idaho

Area
  - Total: 0.69 sq mi (1.78 km^{2})
  - Land: 0.63 sq mi (1.64 km^{2})
  - Water: 0.058 sq mi (0.15 km^{2})
- Elevation: 1,627 ft (496 m)

Population (2020)
  - Total: 514
  - Density: 812/sq mi (313/km^{2})
- Time zone: UTC-8 (Pacific (PST))
  - Summer (DST): UTC-7 (PDT)
- ZIP code: 83539
- Area code: 208
- FIPS code: 16-44110
- GNIS feature ID: 2411556
- Website: cityofkooskia.org

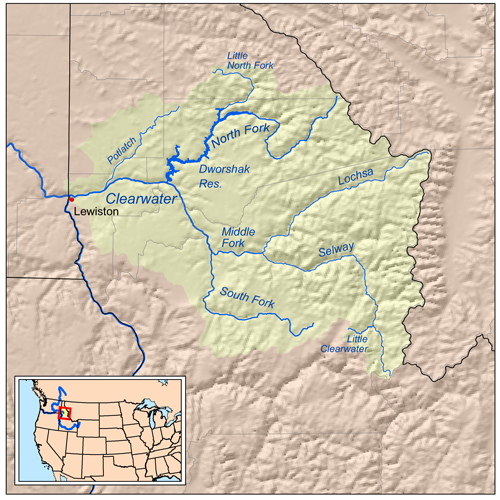
Clearwater River drainage in north central Idaho

Kooskia (/ˈkuːskiː/ KOO-skee) is a city in Idaho County, Idaho, United States. It is at the confluence of the South and Middle forks of the Clearwater River, combining to become the main river. The population was 514 at the 2020 census, down from 607 in 2010.

== History ==
Chief Looking Glass lived in a village a short distance above what is now Kooskia with his band of Nez Perce. This regular home was well within the boundaries of the reservation created in 1863, but just before the Nez Perce War an American General was sent to arrest Chief Looking Glass and all other Nez Perce with him. When trigger-happy militiamen opened fire into the village, many Nez Perce died and their village was destroyed in the scuffle. Because of this incident, Looking Glass joined with the Nez Perce for the Nez Perce War.

The name of the town is likely a contraction of the Nez Perce word "koos-koos-kia," a diminutive which refers to the Clearwater River, the lesser of the two large rivers in the vicinity, the other being the Snake. The town was first named Stuart, after James Stuart (1863–1929), a Nez Perce surveyor and merchant. The railroad arrived in 1899 and named its station "Kooskia," because there already was a railroad station named "Stuart" in the state. The town went by both names for the next decade until it was formally renamed in 1909.

Kooskia is within the Nez Perce Indian Reservation. Similar to the opening of lands in Oklahoma several years earlier, the U.S. government opened the reservation for white settlement in November 1895. The proclamation had been signed less than two weeks earlier by President Cleveland.

=== Tramway ===
Starting in 1903, Kooskia was the terminus of an aerial tramway from the elevated Camas Prairie. It carried up to 190,000 lb (86,000 kg) of grain per day in its 30 buckets and warehouse facilities were present at both ends of the cable line, with a combined capacity of 100,000 US bushels (120,000 ft^{3}; 3,500 m^{3}).

Following the completion of the Camas Prairie Railroad's second subdivision to Grangeville in 1909, the tramway gradually lost patronage and was discontinued in 1939. It climbed west-southwest toward Lowe (later Winona); some older maps listed Kooskia as "Tramway." It experienced a significant accident in 1907 due to cable failure. There were no fatalities.

=== Kooskia Internment Camp ===
During the final two years of World War II, the Kooskia Internment Camp was located about 30 miles (50 km) northeast of the town. Originally a remote highway work camp of the Civilian Conservation Corps in the 1930s, it was later run by the Federal Bureau of Prisons and then converted in 1943 to house interned Japanese men, most of whom were longtime U.S. residents, but not citizens, branded "enemy aliens." It was so remote in the western Bitterroot Mountains that fences and guard towers were unnecessary. The site, now an archaeological project, is six miles (10 km) northeast of Lowell on U.S. 12, on the north bank of the Lochsa River.

=== Kooskia National Fish Hatchery ===
The Kooskia National Fish Hatchery was established in the 1960s, about 1.5 miles (2.4 km) southeast of the city on the east bank of Clear Creek. (46.13°N 115.947°W)

== Geography ==
According to the United States Census Bureau, the city has a total area of 0.69 square miles (1.79 km^{2}), of which, 0.65 square miles (1.68 km^{2}) is land and 0.04 square miles (0.10 km^{2}) is water.

== Demographics ==
Historical population
Census	Pop.	Note	%±
1900	68		—
1910	301		342.6%
1920	405		34.6%
1930	411		1.5%
1940	490		19.2%
1950	629		28.4%
1960	801		27.3%
1970	809		1.0%
1980	784		−3.1%
1990	692		−11.7%
2000	675		−2.5%
2010	607		−10.1%
2020	514		−15.3%
U.S. Decennial Census

=== 2010 census ===
As of the census of 2010, there were 607 people, 272 households, and 149 families residing in the city. The population density was 933.8 inhabitants per square mile (360.5/km^{2}). There were 315 housing units at an average density of 484.6 per square mile (187.1/km^{2}). The racial makeup of the city was 90.0% White, 4.9% Native American, 0.5% Asian, 0.2% from other races, and 4.4% from two or more races. Hispanic or Latino of any race were 2.1% of the population.

There were 272 households, of which 26.1% had children under the age of 18 living with them, 40.4% were married couples living together, 9.6% had a female householder with no husband present, 4.8% had a male householder with no wife present, and 45.2% were non-families. 37.1% of all households were made up of individuals, and 18% had someone living alone who was 65 years of age or older. The average household size was 2.17 and the average family size was 2.79.

The median age in the city was 46.4 years. 20.9% of residents were under the age of 18; 5.9% were between the ages of 18 and 24; 20.9% were from 25 to 44; 30.1% were from 45 to 64; and 22.1% were 65 years of age or older. The gender makeup of the city was 50.6% male and 49.4% female.

=== 2000 census ===
As of the census of 2000, there were 675 people, 278 households, and 179 families residing in the city. The population density was 1,039.3 inhabitants per square mile (401.3/km^{2}). There were 332 housing units at an average density of 511.2 per square mile (197.4/km^{2}). The racial makeup of the city was 93.19% White, 2.22% Native American, 0.30% Asian, 1.63% from other races, and 2.67% from two or more races. Hispanic or Latino of any race were 2.37% of the population.

There were 278 households, out of which 30.2% had children under the age of 18 living with them, 47.5% were married couples living together, 11.5% had a female householder with no husband present, and 35.3% were non-families. 33.1% of all households were made up of individuals, and 20.9% had someone living alone who was 65 years of age or older. The average household size was 2.34 and the average family size was 2.94.

In the city, the population was spread out, with 25.9% under the age of 18, 6.8% from 18 to 24, 25.3% from 25 to 44, 22.7% from 45 to 64, and 19.3% who were 65 years of age or older. The median age was 40 years. For every 100 females, there were 101.5 males. For every 100 females age 18 and over, there were 91.6 males.

The median income for a household in the city was $20,491, and the median income for a family was $23,750. Males had a median income of $31,875 versus $12,500 for females. The per capita income for the city was $11,196. About 25.0% of families and 25.6% of the population were below the poverty line, including 35.1% of those under age 18 and 12.3% of those age 65 or over.

== Climate ==
According to the Köppen climate classification system, Kooskia has an oceanic climate (Köppen Cfb). However, the drying trend in late summer nearly qualifies Kooskia's climate as having a warm-summer Mediterranean climate (Köppen Csb).

Climate data for Kooskia (1989-2006)
Month	Jan	Feb	Mar	Apr	May	Jun	Jul	Aug	Sep	Oct	Nov	Dec	Year
Record high °F (°C)	55 (13)	68 (20)	75 (24)	83 (28)	91 (33)	99 (37)	107 (42)	106 (41)	99 (37)	87 (31)	76 (24)	55 (13)	107 (42)
Mean daily maximum °F (°C)	38 (3)	43.5 (6.4)	52.5 (11.4)	59.3 (15.2)	66.5 (19.2)	73 (23)	84.9 (29.4)	86.5 (30.3)	76.9 (24.9)	60.9 (16.1)	45 (7)	36.4 (2.4)	60.3 (15.7)
Mean daily minimum °F (°C)	25.3 (−3.7)	25.6 (−3.6)	31.3 (−0.4)	36.3 (2.4)	43 (6)	48.5 (9.2)	53.6 (12.0)	52.8 (11.6)	46 (8)	36.5 (2.5)	29.5 (−1.4)	23.6 (−4.7)	37.7 (3.2)
Record low °F (°C)	−6 (−21)	−11 (−24)	6 (−14)	22 (−6)	28 (−2)	34 (1)	38 (3)	30 (−1)	27 (−3)	9 (−13)	−6 (−21)	−14 (−26)	−14 (−26)
Average precipitation inches (mm)	2.06 (52)	1.51 (38)	2.25 (57)	3.15 (80)	3.94 (100)	2.5 (64)	1.27 (32)	0.82 (21)	1.08 (27)	2.05 (52)	2.46 (62)	1.81 (46)	24.91 (633)
Average snowfall inches (cm)	4.2 (11)	0.6 (1.5)	1.5 (3.8)	0.4 (1.0)	0 (0)	0 (0)	0 (0)	0 (0)	0 (0)	0 (0)	2.1 (5.3)	3.2 (8.1)	12 (30)
Average precipitation days	14	11	13	15	14	13	6	5	6	10	14	14	135
Source: WRCC

== Notable people ==
- Skip Brandt, former member of the Idaho Senate
- Carl Crabtree, rancher and politician
- Chaske Spencer, actor known for The Twilight Saga and Banshee

== Highways ==
- – U.S. 12 - to Lewiston (west) and Missoula (east)
- – SH 13 - to Grangeville (south)

== See also ==
- List of cities in Idaho
