= Elk City, Idaho =

Census-designated place in Idaho County, Idaho, United States

- Census-designated place
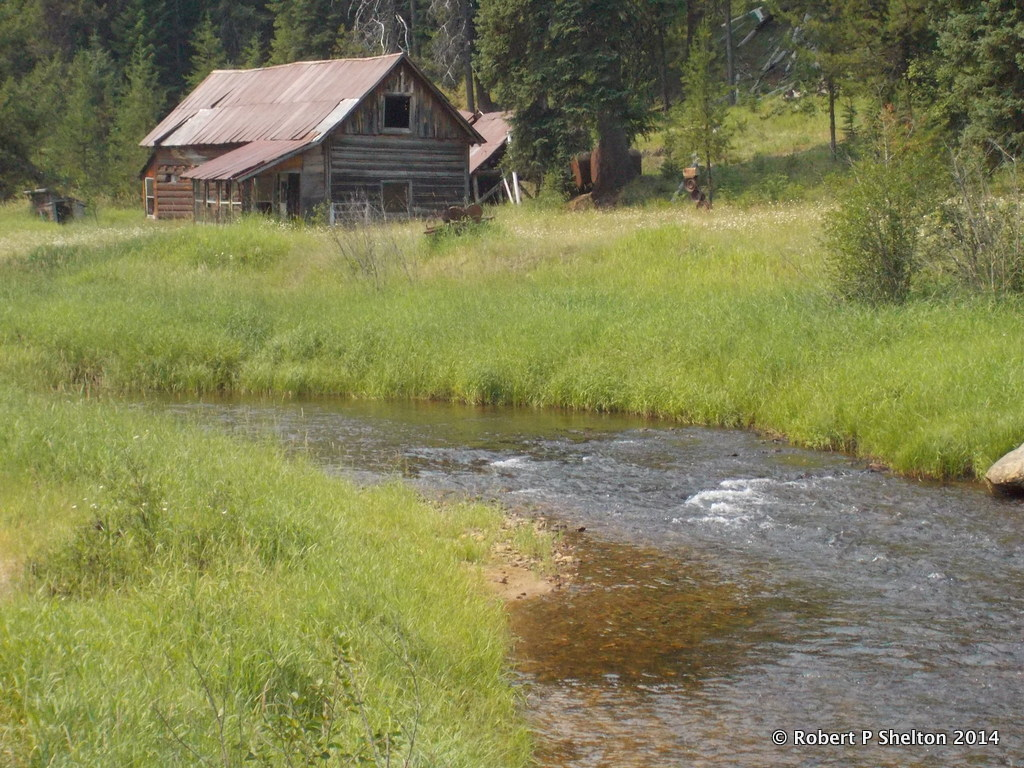
- Gold Mill near Elk City, Idaho, August 2014

- Location within Idaho Location within the United States
- Coordinates: 45°49′37″N 115°26′12″W
- Country: United States
- State: Idaho
- County: Idaho

Area
  - Total: 2.510 sq mi (6.50 km^{2})
  - Land: 2.506 sq mi (6.49 km^{2})
  - Water: 0.004 sq mi (0.010 km^{2})
- Elevation: 4,003 ft (1,220 m)

Population (2020 census)
  - Total: 170
  - Density: 68/sq mi (26/km^{2})
- Time zone: UTC-8 (Pacific (PST))
  - Summer (DST): UTC-7 (PDT)
- ZIP code: 83525
- Area codes: 208, 986
- GNIS feature ID: 2585570

Elk City is a census-designated place in Idaho County, in the U.S. state of Idaho. As of the 2020 United States Census, the population was 170.

== Geography ==
Elk City lies at the eastern end of Idaho State Highway 14, in the South Fork Clearwater River drainage of western Idaho County. The community is remote and mountainous; the Elk City area sits at an elevation of approximately 4,003 feet (1,220 m).

== History ==
Elk City was founded after a placer gold discovery in 1861. Prospectors from Pierce and other nearby camps rushed into the South Fork Clearwater drainage that year; by the fall of 1861 more than 2,000 people had flocked to the diggings in the Elk City/Newsome Creek area.

By the early 1870s much of the richest placer ground had been worked out and many European-American miners moved on; Chinese miners then worked many of the remaining claims until discriminatory laws and local pressures curtailed their operations.

Hard-rock (quartz-vein) mining increased around 1902, and dredging operations occurred in the 1930s, sustaining local mining activity into the early 20th century. A major fire in 1930 damaged much of the town and, combined with the later decline in mining, shifted the local economy toward timber, ranching, and recreation.

Local preservation efforts have celebrated historic routes such as the Elk City Wagon Road; the Wagon Road and related historic resources have been documented by Idaho heritage organizations and were the subject of centennial commemoration and preservation projects in the 1990s.

== Demographics ==
As of the 2020 U.S. Census, Elk City's population was 170.

Historical population
| Census | Pop. | Note | %± |
|---|---|---|---|
| 1880 | 276 | | — |
| 1900 | 252 | | — |
| 1910 | 250 | | −0.8% |
| 1920 | 210 | | −16.0% |
| 1930 | 150 | | −28.6% |
| 1940 | 150 | | 0.0% |
| 1950 | 180 | | 20.0% |
| 1960 | 300 | | 66.7% |
| 1970 | 450 | | 50.0% |
| 1980 | 670 | | 48.9% |
| 1990 | 670 | | 0.0% |
| 2000 | 376 | | −43.9% |
| 2010 | 202 | | −46.3% |
| 2020 | 170 | | −15.8% |

== Geology ==
The Elk City area is part of a geologically complex mining district with both placer (stream-worked) gold deposits and later quartz-vein (hard-rock) occurrences. U.S. Geological Survey and Idaho Geological Survey publications detail the district's placer and lode deposits and provide maps and mine/prospect inventories for the Elk City quadrangle and adjacent areas.

== Services and infrastructure ==
Elk City maintains a United States Postal Service office serving ZIP code 83525. The town supports basic services for the surrounding area including lodging, a general store, Forest Service facilities, and limited public services appropriate to its remote location.
