= Frank Church–River of No Return Wilderness =

Federal protected area in Idaho, United States

- IUCN category Ib (wilderness area)
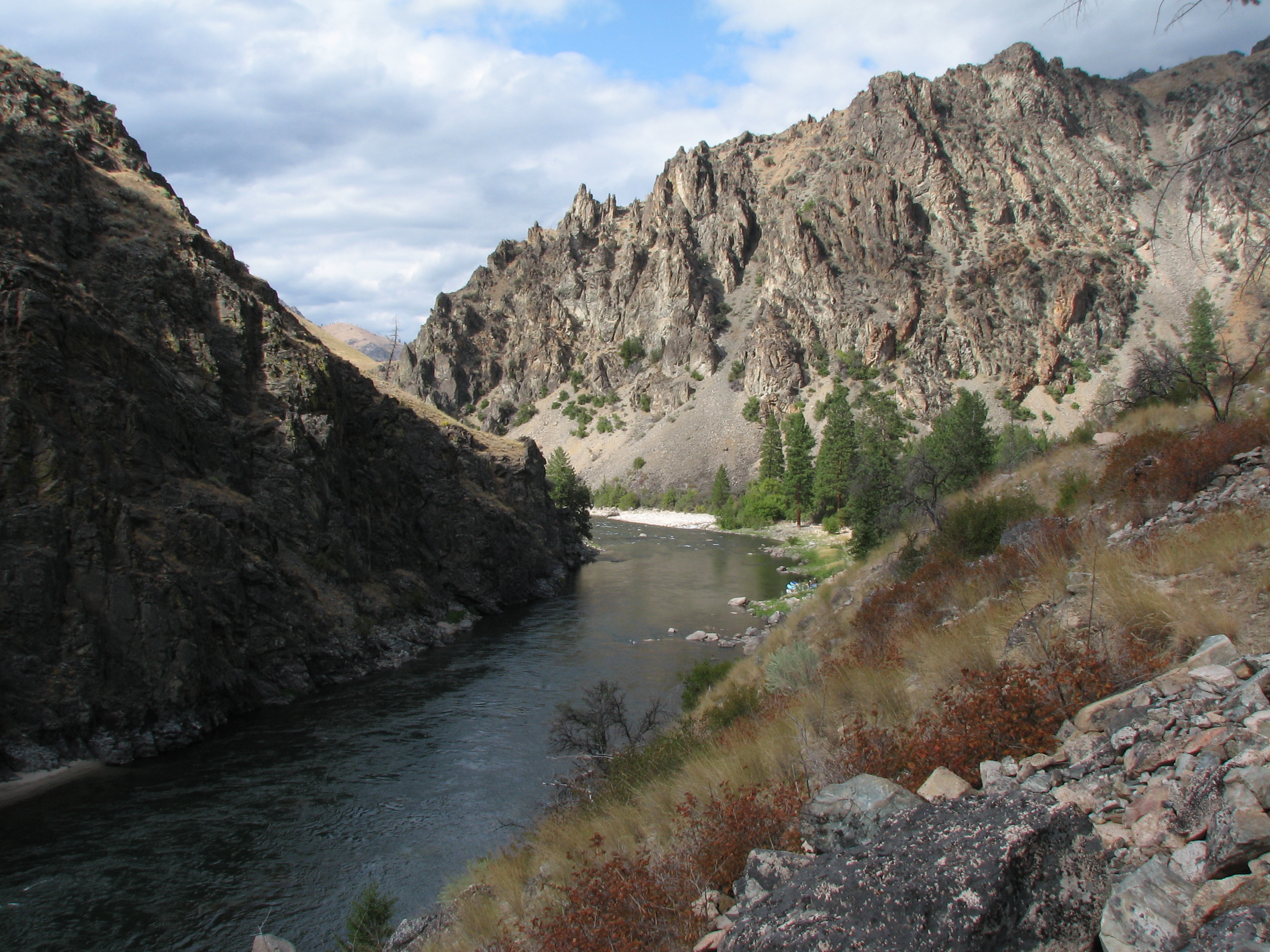
- Middle Fork Salmon River

- Location within the United States
- Location: Idaho / Valley / Lemhi / Custer counties, Idaho, U.S.
- Nearest city: Yellow Pine, Idaho
- Coordinates: 45°3′55″N 114°57′16″W
- Area: 2,366,827 acres (9,578.21 km^{2})
- Established: January 1, 1980
- Governing body: U.S. Forest Service

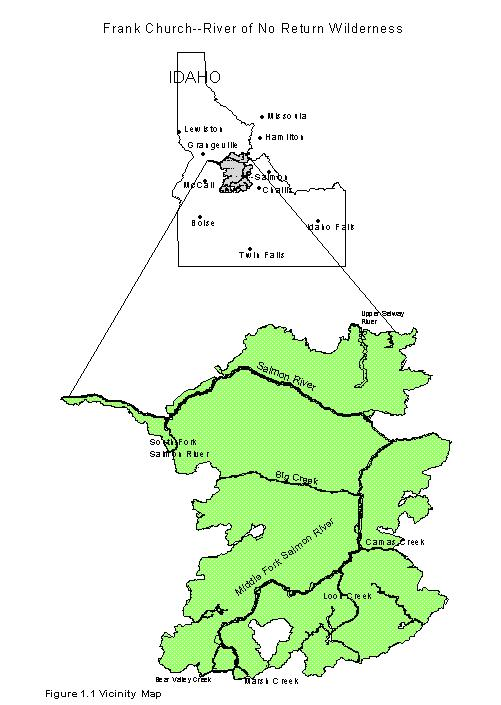
Map of Idaho showing location of the Frank Church-River of No Return Wilderness

The Frank Church—River of No Return Wilderness is a protected wilderness area in Idaho. It was created in 1980 by the United States Congress and took its current name in 1984 in honor of U.S. Senator Frank Church.

At 2.367 million acres (9,580 km^{2}), it is the largest contiguous federally managed wilderness in the United States outside of Alaska. The Death Valley Wilderness is the largest single designated area but consists of numerous disconnected units. The wilderness protects several mountain ranges, extensive wildlife, and a popular whitewater rafting river: the Salmon River.

== Description ==
Together with the adjacent Gospel Hump Wilderness and surrounding unprotected roadless Forest Service land, it is the core of a 3.3 million acre (13,000 km^{2}) roadless area. It is separated from the Selway-Bitterroot Wilderness, to the north, by a single dirt road (the Magruder Corridor). The wilderness contains parts of several mountain ranges, including the Salmon River Mountains, the Clearwater Mountains, and the Bighorn Crags. The ranges are split by steep canyons of the Middle and Main forks of the Salmon River. The Salmon River is a popular destination for whitewater rafting, and is known as the "River of No Return" for its swift current and large rapids which make upstream travel difficult. Most of the area is covered by coniferous forests, with dry, open land along the rivers at lower elevations.

While designation as a wilderness area in the United States generally requires the prohibition of any motorized machinery, the use of jetboats (on the Main Fork of the Salmon River) and 26 airstrips are permitted in this wilderness as grandfathered existing uses before the wilderness was designated.

=== National forests ===
The Frank Church—River of No Return Wilderness is located in six different national forests plus a relatively tiny portion of land of the Bureau of Land Management, more components than any other wilderness. In descending order of acreage they are:

- Payette National Forest (33.45%)
- Challis National Forest (21.78%)
- Salmon National Forest (17.81%) (now administratively combined with Challis NF, so that their total is 39.59%)
- Boise National Forest (14.06%)
- Bitterroot National Forest (8.18%)
- Nez Perce National Forest (4.68%)
- Bureau of Land Management (0.034%)

== History ==
In 1931, 1,090,000 acres (4,400 km^{2}) in Central Idaho were declared by the U.S. Forest Service as The Idaho Primitive Area. In 1963, the Selway-Bitterroot Wilderness was split into three parts: The Selway-Bitterroot Wilderness, the Salmon River Breaks Primitive area, and the Magruder Corridor—the land between the two areas.

Frank Church was the Senate floor sponsor for the Wilderness Act of 1964, which protected 9 million acres (36,000 km^{2}) of United States land as part of the National Wilderness Preservation System. In 1968, he introduced the Wild and Scenic Rivers Act, which included the Middle Fork of the Salmon River, so that rivers "shall be preserved in free-flowing condition, and that they and their immediate environments shall be protected for the benefit and enjoyment of present and future generations".

Church's environmental legislation culminated in 1980 with the passage of the Central Idaho Wilderness Act. The act created the River of No Return Wilderness by combining the Idaho Primitive Area, the Salmon River Breaks Primitive Area, and a portion of the Magruder Corridor. The Act also added 125 miles (200 km) of the Salmon River to the Wild and Scenic Rivers System. President Carter had taken his family on a three-day float trip down the Middle Fork of the Salmon River in August 1978, accompanied by Interior Secretary Cecil Andrus, the former (and future) Idaho governor. The administration forwarded a central Idaho wilderness proposal to Congress later that year and Carter signed the final act on July 23, 1980. In January 1984, Congress honored Senator Church, who had been diagnosed with pancreatic cancer, by renaming the area The Frank Church—River of No Return Wilderness. Idaho Senator Jim McClure introduced the measure in the Senate in late February, and President Reagan signed the act on March 14, less than four weeks before Church's death on April 7 at age 59.

== Wildlife ==
Because of its size the wilderness area provides a secluded habitat for a wide variety of mammal species, including some rare, vulnerable species. The wilderness is inhabited by a large population of cougars and wolves. Populations of black bears, as well as lynx, coyote, and red fox are scattered throughout the area. Other observable ruminant wildlife within the wilderness include bighorn sheep, mountain goats, elk, moose, mule deer, and white-tailed deer. While this area has been deemed as one of the few remaining areas in the contiguous states with suitable habitat for grizzly bears, no established populations are known to exist. The wilderness also offers some of the most critical habitat for wolverines in the lower 48 states. Beavers that were parachuted into the area (Beaver drop) from Idaho (in 1948) have established a healthy colony here.

Wolves once ranged throughout nearly all of Idaho but by 1930 became locally extinct from shooting, trapping and poisoning. After they were nearly wiped out in the lower 48 states, wolves in Idaho were declared endangered in 1974 under the Endangered Species Act. In 1995, wolves from Canada were reintroduced here due to the remote location, the availability of prey and the area being under federal jurisdiction. In the same year, wolves were also released in Yellowstone National Park. By the next year, three packs were identified and the first pups were observed. By 1998, there were at least 10 breeding pairs which was one component of the recovery project. In compliance with a rider attached to a Senate budget bill, U.S. Fish and Wildlife Service removed wolves in Idaho and Montana from the endangered species list in 2011.

== Incidents ==
On August 7, 2013, a retired sheriff and three other horseback riders in the rugged back country encountered Hannah Anderson and her abductor, James DiMaggio. FBI agents rescued Anderson and killed DiMaggio near Morehead Lake on August 10.

== See also ==
- List of U.S. Wilderness Areas
- Wilderness Act
