= Payette National Forest =

National Forest in Idaho

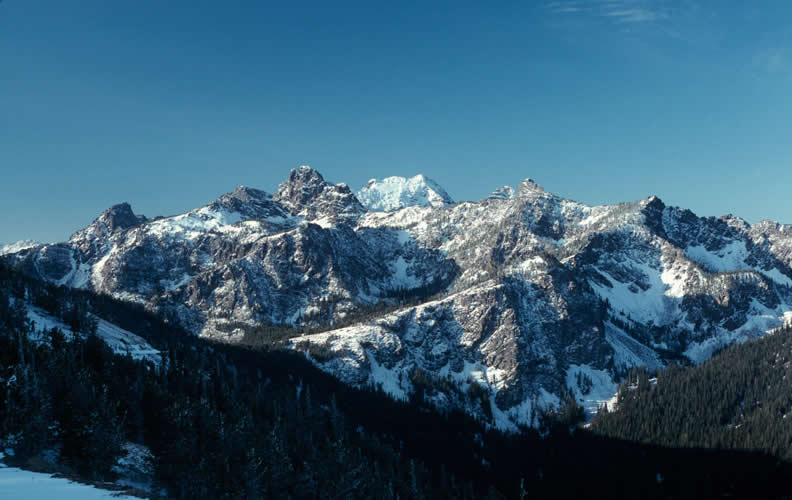
- Seven Devils Mountains in Payette National Forest

- Location within the United States
- Location: Idaho, United States
- Nearest city: McCall, ID
- Coordinates: 44°54′39″N 116°6′11″W
- Area: 2,327,621 acres (9,419.55 km^{2})
- Established: April 1, 1944
- Website: Payette National Forest

The Payette National Forest is a U.S. National Forest located in central western Idaho, in parts of Valley, Idaho, Adams, and Washington counties. The land area consists of approximately 2.3 million acres (9,300 km^{2}) of federally managed lands. It is bordered by Hells Canyon National Recreation Area and the Hells Canyon to the west, Salmon-Challis National Forest to the east, Boise National Forest to the south, and the Nez Perce National Forest to the north. The Payette National Forest is a part of the Intermountain Region (Region 4). It is under the jurisdiction of a forest supervisor in McCall and is divided into five ranger districts: McCall, Krassel, New Meadows, Council, and Weiser.

The Payette also provides the largest component of the Frank Church-River of No Return Wilderness, the second-largest designated wilderness area outside Alaska. Approximately 790,000 acres (3,200 km^{2}) of it is within the wilderness, comprising one-third of its total acreage. (Five other National Forests also contribute to the River of No Return Wilderness, in addition to a small plot of land from the Bureau of Land Management.) It also provides the third-largest component of the Hells Canyon Wilderness.

The Forest Reserve Act of 1891 helped the creation of the Weiser Reserve in 1905 and the Idaho Reserve in 1908. A merger of these two reserves (later called forests) on April 1, 1944 created the official Payette National Forest. It is named for François Payette (1793-18xx), a French-Canadian fur trapper and later the manager of Fort Boise for the Hudson's Bay Company from 1835-1844. He was one of the first white men to settle in the area, venturing east from Astoria, Oregon in 1818. A large and amiable man, he was highly regarded for being very helpful to travelers. He returned to Montreal in 1844 and the remainder of his life is a mystery.

The Payette National Forest is located above the Idaho Batholith, the largest granitic body of rock in the United States. Glacial activity as recently as 15,000 years ago also shaped the character of the forest providing lakes and granite outcrops. The forest is made up of eight species of conifer trees, 300 species of mammals and birds, a number of fish species protected under the Endangered Species Act, and a wide variety of wildflowers. Streams and lakes drain into two of Idaho's major rivers, the Salmon or the Snake.

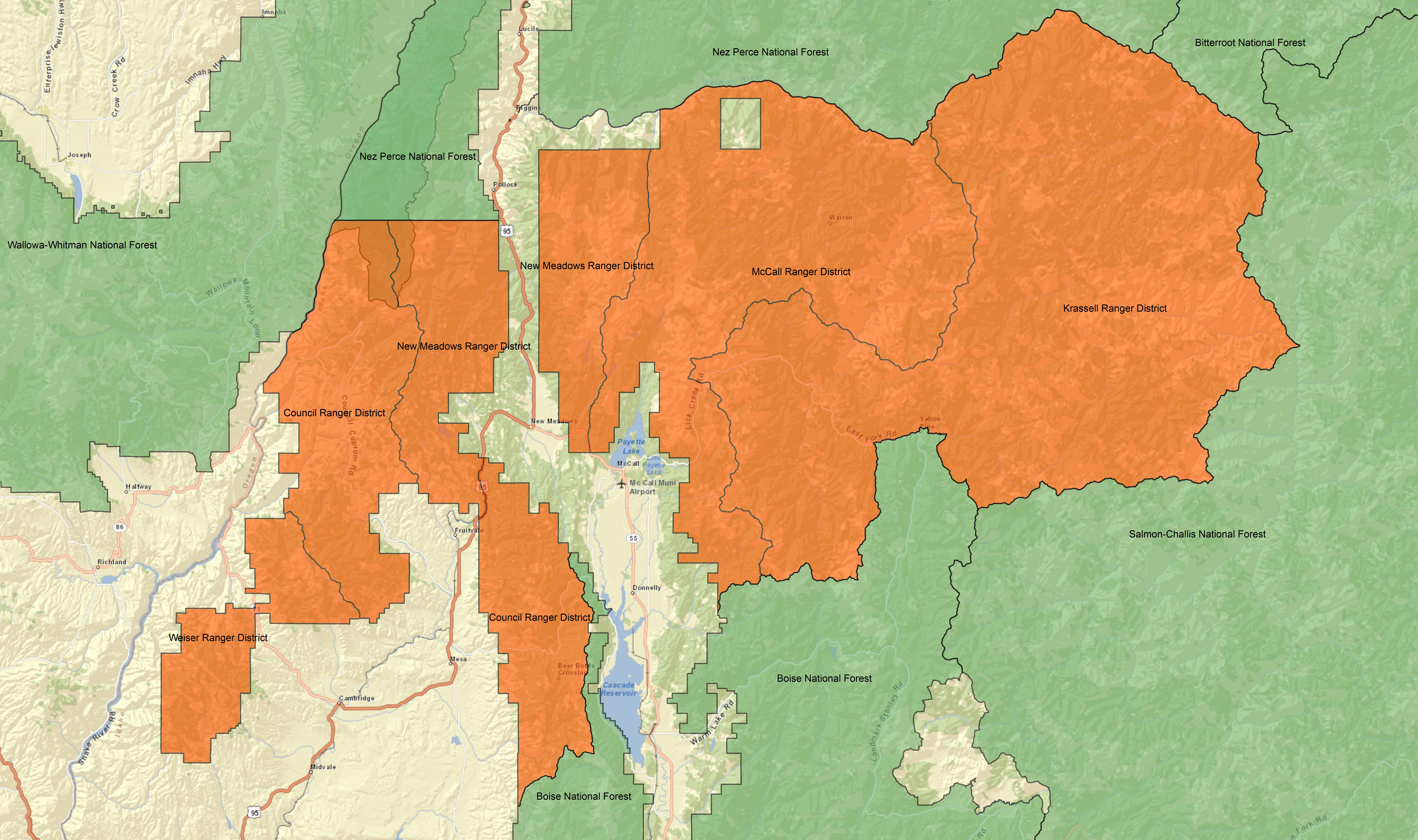
A map of Payette National Forest (orange).

== See also ==
- List of national forests of the United States
- List of wilderness areas in the United States
