= Jim Moore Place =

- Moore, Jim, Place
- U.S. National Register of Historic Places
- U.S. Historic district
- Location within Idaho Location within the United States
- Nearest city: Dixie, Idaho County, Idaho
- Area: 42 acres (17 ha)
- Built: 1898 and later
- Built by: Moore, Jim; Churchill, C.E.
- NRHP reference No.: 78001063
- Added to NRHP: March 29, 1978

The Jim Moore Place in Salmon River Canyon near Dixie in Idaho County, Idaho dates from 1898, when Jim Moore and C. E. Churchill built the first house there. The house and eight other buildings which followed in the next 15 years were log buildings, with logs hewn by broad axe. There was also a root cellar, an orchard, and agricultural fields.

Jim Moore did not homestead the property, but rather obtained a placer mining claim on it, naming it Slide Creek Placer.

It was deemed significant as "the only remaining relatively unaltered example of a lifestyle that is rapidly disappearing in the Salmon River country."

The Jim Moore Place is located on one of the major routes to the Thunder Mountain Mining area called the Three Blaze Trail. Campbell's Ferry is located across the Salmon River from the Jim Moore Place and was instrumental in providing a crossing of the Salmon River, Idaho for the miners traveling to the Thunder Mountain Mining area.

The listed area is 42 acres (17 ha) in size and included nine contributing buildings, a contributing structure, and a contributing site.
