= Jefferson J. Standifer =

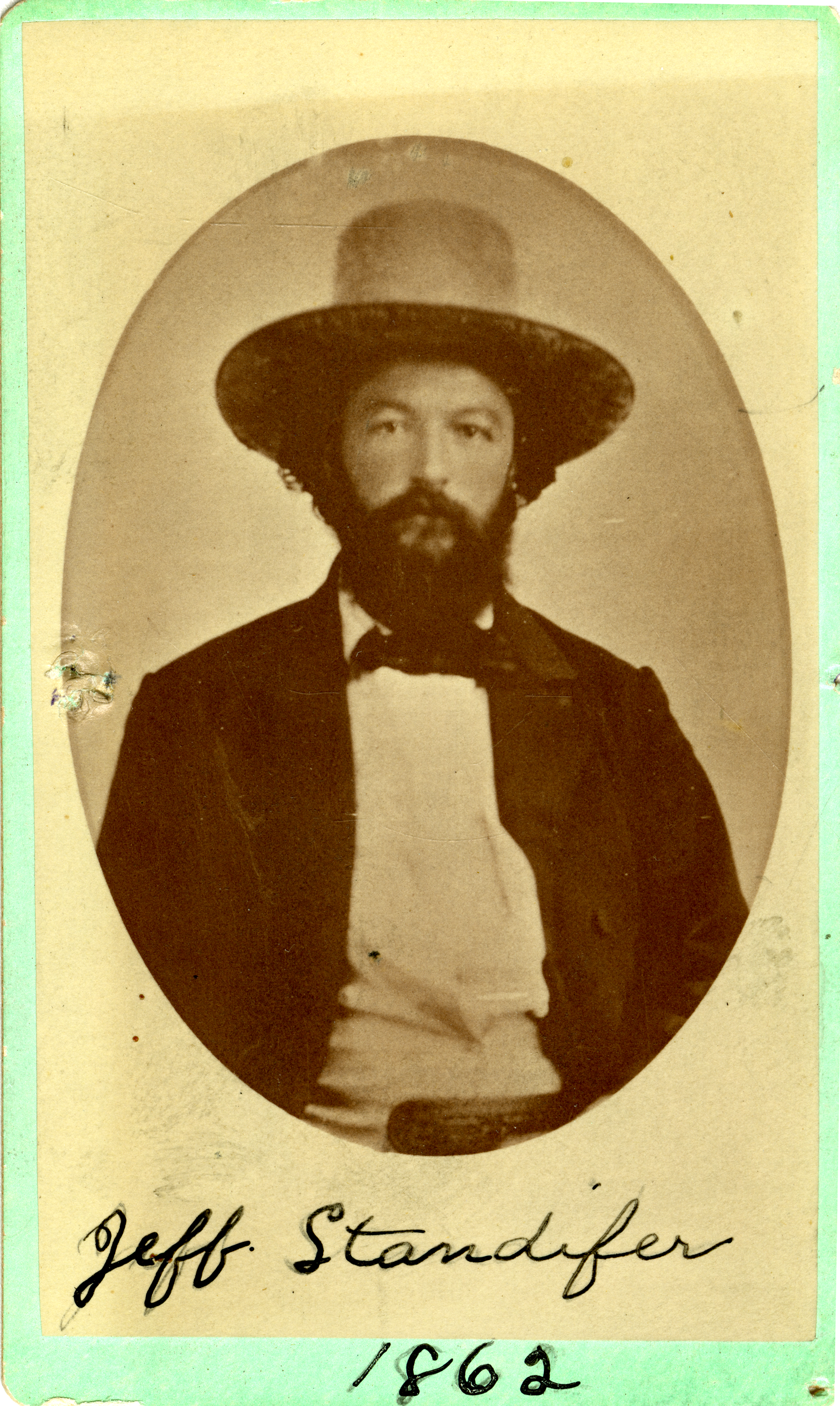
Jefferson Standifer

Jefferson J. Standifer was an American gold miner, lawman, prospector, explorer, and member of the Knights of the Golden Circle. He was the first sheriff of Idaho County, and there is a street named after him in Placerville, Idaho where he resided for a short time.

== Early life ==
Jeff Standifer was born to Nancy and James Standifer around 1832. They homesteaded near Young's Settlement, Bastrop County, Texas. James died in 1843, followed by Nancy in 1846. This left a teenage Jefferson Standifer to be raised by his siblings. In 1850, Standifer and his brothers moved to California to take part in the gold rush.

== Gold mining ==
Standifer took part in gold prospecting and mining in California, Oregon, British Columbia, Idaho, Wyoming and Montana. He also was a partner in a gold mine in Sinaloa, Mexico. He was credited as creating thousands of mining jobs in the west.

== Idaho ==
In 1862, Standifer was named first sheriff of Idaho County by the Washington Territorial Legislature. He mined in Florence, Idaho before leading an expedition to the Boise Basin. Standifer became a prominent citizen there. He built the Magnolia Saloon in Placerville, one of the few remaining early structures in the area. There is a street there named after him. In the Spring of 1863, attacks by Native Americans were threatening the mines. Standifer organized the first militia in Idaho to combat this threat.

== Membership in the Knights of the Golden Circle ==
Standifer's movements throughout his life indicate he was a member of the Knights of the Golden Circle. When Federal Troops came to establish a fort in Boise, Standifer fled the area. He then went to Mexico where he met with a known Confederate spy. Standifer helped men travel from California to Texas through Mexico to join the Confederate Army. Standifer was then ordered to camp in Bastrop, his hometown. Bastrop was also the site of a KGC Castle. Earlier in his life, Standifer was present in the Hawaiian Islands at the same time a precursor organization had filibustering plans there.

== Death ==
Standifer died in 1874 at Fort Steele, Wyoming, after contracting Rocky Mountain Spotted Fever on an expedition led by William F. Cody. A recent marker was placed in his grave by the Twenty First Century Confederate Legion. The marker indicates Standifer was a veteran of the "CSA CAV 1ST Calif. BN" This military unit does not seem to have existed.
