= Grand Lodge of Idaho =

US state Freemasonry body

Grand Lodge of Idaho A.F. & A.M.
- Seal of the Grand Lodge of Idaho A.F. & A.M.
- Established: 1867
- Location: USA
- Region served: Idaho

The Grand Lodge of Idaho (full formal name Grand Lodge of Idaho, Ancient Free & Accepted Masons) is one of several bodies that govern Freemasonry in the U.S. state of Idaho as recognized by the United Grand Lodge of England. It was established in 1867 by five Masonic Lodges operating in Idaho Territory.

The Grand Lodge of Idaho is headquartered in Boise.

== History ==
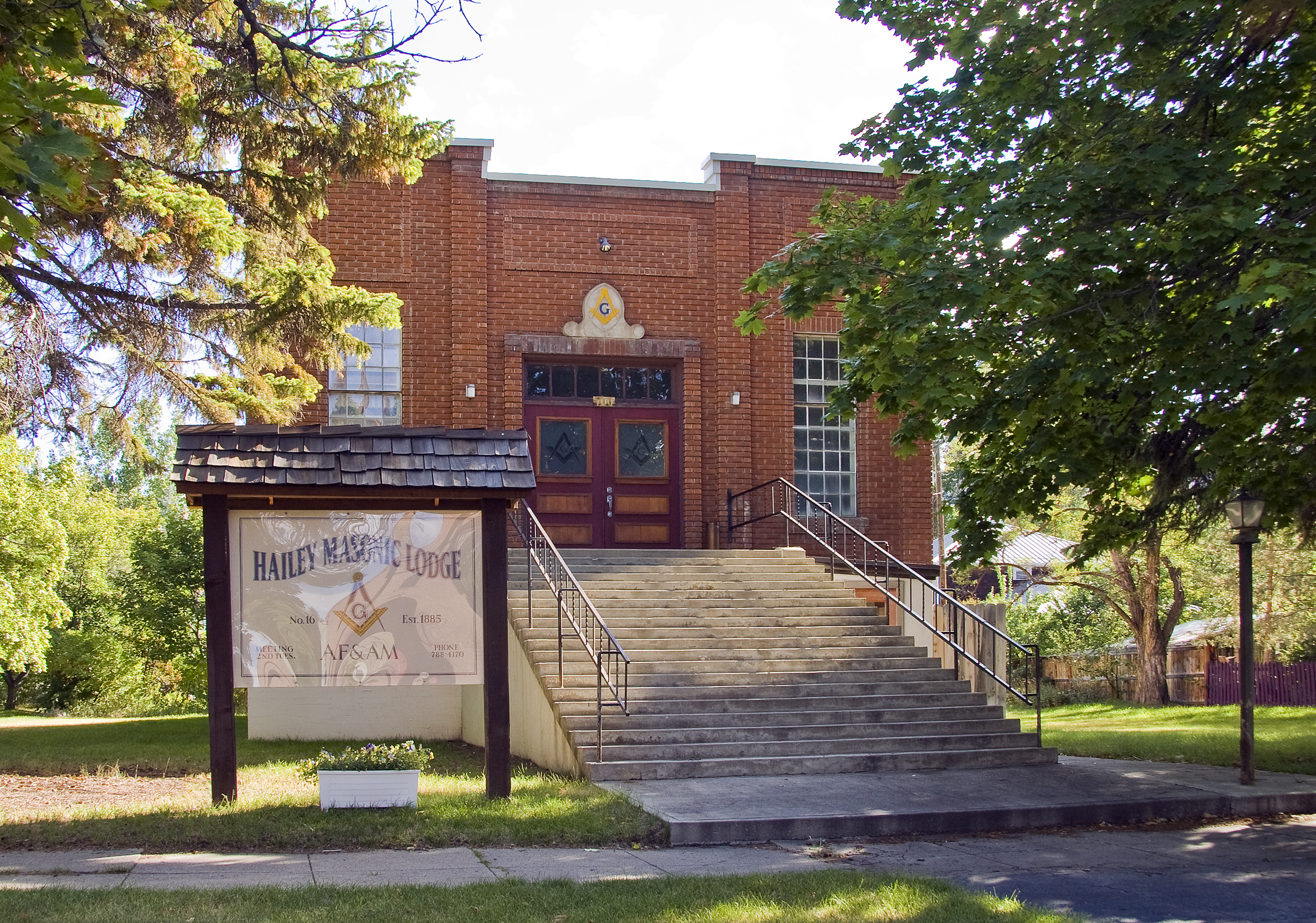
Hailey Masonic Lodge

The first organized Masonic activity in present-day Idaho dates to 1862, when a group of Freemasons organized an informal Masonic club in Florence in what was then Washington Territory. That same year, a dispensation was granted by the Grand Lodge of Washington to form a new Masonic Lodge in Lewiston. This Lodge was chartered in 1864 but disbanded a year later after a decline in gold mining activities in the area.

In July 1863 the Grand Lodge of Oregon granted a dispensation to a Masonic group in Bannock City, now Idaho City. This Lodge was chartered as Idaho Lodge No. 35 in 1864. The Grand Lodge of Washington, which considered all of Idaho Territory to be within its jurisdiction, charged the Grand Lodge of Oregon with illegally chartering the lodge. This controversy continued for some time and spread throughout the Masonic community in the United States. Even so, over the next couple years Masonic Lodges in northern Idaho Territory were granted charters in Washington while southern Idaho Territory Lodges continued to receive charters from Oregon.

By 1867 the need for a local Grand Lodge was recognized by the active Masonic Lodges in southern Idaho Territory. These Masonic Lodges, Idaho Lodge of Idaho City, Boise Lodge of Boise, Placer Lodge of Placerville, Pioneer Lodge of Pioneerville, and Owyhee Lodge of Silver City, met in December 1867 to form the Grand Lodge of Idaho. This meeting is considered to be the founding of the Grand Lodge of Idaho. The new Grand Lodge issued charters to these five Lodges in June 1868 which superseded their original charters from Oregon.

Idaho Lodge, which spearheaded the drive to create a Grand Lodge in Idaho Territory, was given the distinction of being recognized as its first chartered Lodge. Today Idaho Lodge No. 1 is headquartered in Boise.

A Masonic Lodge in Grangeville was chartered by the Grand Lodge of Idaho in December 1873, becoming the first northern Idaho Lodge under the Grand Lodge of Idaho's jurisdiction.

Freemasonry spread quickly in Idaho. By the time Idaho attained statehood in July 1890 there were 21 active regular Masonic Lodges in the new state. In 1910 there were nearly 60. Since its founding the Grand Lodge of Idaho has chartered 97 regular Masonic Lodges. However, in the post-World War II era, the number of Masonic lodges has declined. As of 2006, there were only 64 actives lodges in Idaho, and by 2020, the number had further decreased to 47.

The Idaho Lodge of Research, a special Masonic Lodge dedicated to Masonic scholarship, was chartered in 1965.

== Membership ==
As in most Masonic jurisdictions, membership in a Masonic Lodge under the jurisdiction of the Grand Lodge of Idaho is open to any male over 18 years of age who believes in a Supreme Being. In addition, Idaho Lodges require a candidate to be an Idaho resident for at least six months and apply for membership in his local Lodge. However, once he becomes a member of his local Lodge he may become a "plural affiliate" (i.e. a member of another Lodge simultaneously) elsewhere.

In Idaho "membership in Masons statewide has declined from 11,000 in 1982 to 4,388 members" in 2010, and to 2,198 by 2023. Also "the number of lodges has declined to 56."

== Prince Hall Freemasonry in Idaho ==
In the early 1990s the Grand Lodge of Idaho formally recognized Prince Hall Freemasonry. However, as of 2006 there is no separate Prince Hall Masonic jurisdiction in Idaho. Prince Hall Freemasonry in the state is currently administered by the Prince Hall Grand Lodge of Oregon.

== Current Lodges under the Grand Lodge of Idaho ==
| Lodge | Chartered | Location |
|---|---|---|
| Idaho No. 1 | June 23, 1868 | Boise (originally Idaho City) |
| Boise No. 2 | June 23, 1868 | Boise |
| Placer No. 3 | June 23, 1868 | Horseshoe Bend (originally Placerville) |
| Mount Idaho No. 9 | December 1873 | Grangeville |
| Nez Perce No. 10 | December 1874 | Lewiston |
| Lemhi No. 11 | December 1874 | Salmon |
| Silver City No. 13 | December 1874 | Homedale (originally Silver City) |
| Hailey No. 16 | September 1885 | Hailey |
| Paradise No. 17 | September 1885 | Moscow |
| Portneuf No. 18 | September 1886 | Pocatello |
| Eagle Rock No. 19 | September 1886 | Idaho Falls |
| Coeur d'Alene No. 20 | September 1886 | Murray |
| Richfield No. 21 | September 1887 | Richfield |
| Weiser No. 23 | September 1888 | Weiser |
| Kootenai No. 24 | September 1891 | Coeur d'Alene |
| Shoshone No. 25 | September 1891 | Wallace |
| Washoe No. 28 | September 1892 | Payette |
| Ashlar No. 29^{[n1]} | September 1892 | Nampa |
| Elmore No. 30 | September 1892 | Mountain Home |
| Salubria No. 31 | September 1893 | Cambridge |
| Grove City No. 33 | September 1896 | Blackfoot |
| Cataldo No. 34 | September 1896 | Kellogg |
| Butte No. 37 | September 1902 | Emmett |
| Mount Moriah No. 39 | September 1902 | Caldwell |
| Rathdrum No. 41 | September 1904 | Rathdrum |
| Lakeside No. 42 | September 1904 | Sandpoint |
| Bonners Ferry No. 43 | September 1904 | Bonners Ferry |
| Twin Falls No. 45 | September 1906 | Twin Falls |
| Meridian No. 47 | September 1906 | Meridian |
| Malad No. 51 | September 1908 | Malad City |
| Kamiah No. 56 | September 1910 | Kamiah |
| Spirit Lake No. 57 | September 1910 | Spirit Lake |
| Lincoln No. 59 | September 1910 | Gooding |
| Oriental No. 60 | September 1910 | Boise |
| St. Maries No. 63 | September 1911 | St. Maries |
| Mount McCaleb No. 64 | September 1911 | Mackay |
| Paul No. 77 | September 1920 | Paul |
| Hagerman No. 78 | September 1921 | Hagerman |
| Fidelity No. 80 | September 1921 | Glenns Ferry |
| Ionic No. 82 | September 1922 | Cascade |
| Caribou No. 84 | September 1922 | Soda Springs |
| Challis No. 92 | September 1949 | Challis |
| Capital City No. 93 | September 1950 | Boise |
| Kaniksu No. 97^{[n4]} | September 1995 | Priest River |
| Lodge of Research No. 1965^{[n5]} | September 1965 | Boise |

^[n1] Known as Nampa No. 29 until 1988.
^[n3] Known as Acacia No. 62 until 1943.
^[n4] Previously existed as Kaniksu No. 85, 1922-1987.
^[n5] Lodge of Research No. 1965 is a special Lodge dedicated to Masonic scholarship.
