= Clearwater, Idaho =

Unincorporated community in Idaho, United States

- Unincorporated community
- Location within Idaho Location within the United States
- Coordinates: 46°01′21″N 115°53′28″W
- Country: United States
- State: Idaho
- County: Idaho
- Elevation: 2,549 ft (777 m)
- Time zone: UTC-8 (Pacific (PST))
  - Summer (DST): UTC-7 (PDT)
- Area codes: 208, 986
- GNIS feature ID: 372052

Clearwater is an unincorporated community in Idaho County, Idaho, United States. Clearwater is 6.5 miles (10.5 km) southeast of Stites.

== History ==
Clearwater's population was 40 in 1960.
