= Devils Throne =

Mountain in Idaho County, Idaho, United States

Coordinates: 45°18′31″N 116°33′17″W

Devils Throne is a summit in Idaho County, Idaho, in the United States. It forms part of the Seven Devils Mountains. With an elevation of 9,045 feet (2,757 m), Devils Throne is the 312th highest summit in the state of Idaho.

Devils Throne was named from Nez Perce mythology.
