= The Ogre (Idaho) =

Summit in Idaho

Coordinates: 45°19′10″N 116°31′59″W

The Ogre is a summit in Idaho County, Idaho, in the United States. It forms part of the Seven Devils Mountains. With an elevation of 9,222 feet (2,811 m), The Ogre is the 271st highest summit in the state of Idaho.

The Ogre was named from Nez Perce mythology.
