= Harpster, Idaho =

Unincorporated community in Idaho, United States

- Unincorporated community
- Location within Idaho Location within the United States
- Coordinates: 45°59′12″N 115°57′49″W
- Country: United States
- State: Idaho
- County: Idaho
- Elevation: 1,575 ft (480 m)
- Time zone: UTC-8 (Pacific (PST))
  - Summer (DST): UTC-7 (PDT)
- Area codes: 208, 986
- GNIS feature ID: 397775

Harpster is an unincorporated community in Idaho County, Idaho, United States. Harpster is located along Idaho State Highway 13 northeast of Grangeville and south of Stites.

== History ==
Harpster's population was 135 in 1909.
