= Twin Imps =

Mountain in the state of Idaho

Coordinates: 45°18′08″N 116°33′42″W

Twin Imps is a summit in Idaho County, Idaho, in the United States. It forms part of the Seven Devils Mountains. With an elevation of 8,520 feet (2,600 m), Twin Imps is the 471st highest summit in the state of Idaho.

Twin Imps was named from Nez Perce mythology.
