= Orogrande Airport =

- IATA: none; ICAO: none; FAA LID: 75C

Summary
- Airport type: Public
- Owner: U.S. Forest Service
- Serves: Orogrande, Idaho
- Elevation AMSL: 4,419 ft / 1,347 m
- Coordinates: 45°43′49″N 115°31′40″W
- Interactive map of Orogrande Airport

Runways
Direction	Length		Surface
Direction	ft	m	Surface
1/19	2,800	853	Turf/dirt

Statistics (2021)
- Aircraft operations (year ending 9/30/2021): 100
- Source: Federal Aviation Administration

Orogrande Airport (FAA LID: 75C) is a public-use airport located one nautical mile (1.15 mi, 1.85 km) northeast of the central business district of Orogrande, in Idaho County, Idaho, United States. It is owned by the U.S. Forest Service.

== Facilities and aircraft ==
Orogrande Airport covers an area of 10 acres (4.0 ha) at an elevation of 4,419 feet (1,347 m) above mean sea level. It has one runway designated 1/19 with a turf/dirt surface measuring 2,800 by 50 feet (853 x 15 m).

For the 12-month period ending September 30, 2021, the airport had 100 general aviation aircraft operations, an average of 8 per month.

== See also ==
- List of airports in Idaho
