= Dixie USFS Airport =

- IATA: none; ICAO: none; FAA LID: A05

Summary
- Airport type: Public
- Owner: U.S. Forest Service
- Location: Dixie, Idaho
- Elevation AMSL: 5,148 ft (1,569 m)
- Coordinates: 45°31′15″N 115°31′03″W
- Interactive map of Dixie USFS Airport

Runways
| Direction | Length | | Surface |
| Direction | ft | m | Surface |
|---|---|---|---|
| 18/36 | 4,500 | 1,372 | Turf |

Statistics (2011)
- Aircraft operations: 1,300
- Source: Federal Aviation Administration

Dixie USFS Airport (FAA LID: A05) is a public-use U.S. Forest Service airport located three nautical miles (3.5 mi, 5.6 km) southwest of the central business district of Dixie, in Idaho County, Idaho, United States.

== Facilities and aircraft ==
Dixie USFS Airport covers an area of 35 acres (14 ha) at an elevation of 5,148 feet (1,569 m) above mean sea level. It has one runway designated 18/36 with a turf surface measuring 4,500 by 100 feet (1,372 x 30 m). For the 12-month period ending June 25, 2011, the airport had 1,300 aircraft operations, an average of 108 per month: 77% general aviation and 23% air taxi.

== See also ==
- List of airports in Idaho
