= Wilson Bar USFS Airport =

- IATA: none; ICAO: none; FAA LID: C48

Summary
- Airport type: Public
- Owner: Nez Perce National Forest
- Location: Dixie, Idaho County, Idaho
- Elevation AMSL: 2,275 ft / 693 m
- Coordinates: 45°23′48″N 115°29′00″W
- Interactive map of Wilson Bar USFS Airport

Runways
Direction	Length		Surface
Direction	ft	m	Surface
6/24	1,500	457	Turf

Statistics (2011)
- Aircraft operations: 220
- Source: Federal Aviation Administration

Wilson Bar USFS Airport (FAA LID: C48, formerly ID76) is a public-use U.S. Forest Service airport located eight nautical miles (9 mi, 15 km) south of the central business district of Dixie, in Idaho County, Idaho, United States. It is owned by the Nez Perce National Forest.

== Facilities and aircraft ==
Wilson Bar USFS Airport covers an area of 5 acres (2.0 ha) at an elevation of 2,275 feet (693 m) above mean sea level. It has one runway designated 6/24 with a turf surface measuring 1,500 by 50 feet (457 x 15 m). For the 12-month period ending June 24, 2011, the airport had 220 aircraft operations, an average of 18 per month: 91% general aviation and 9% air taxi.

== See also ==
- List of airports in Idaho
