= 1912 United States presidential election in Idaho =

- November 5, 1912

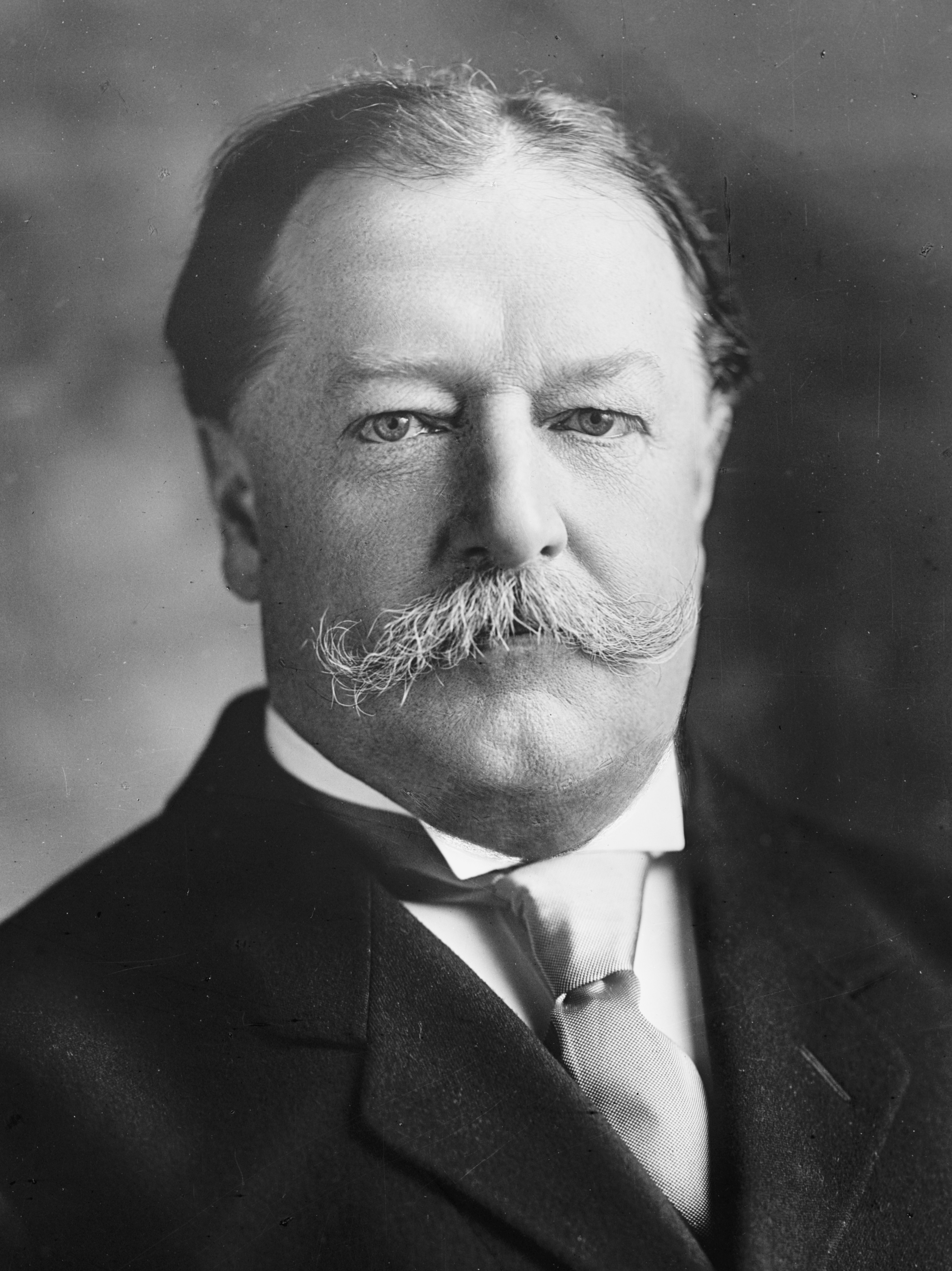

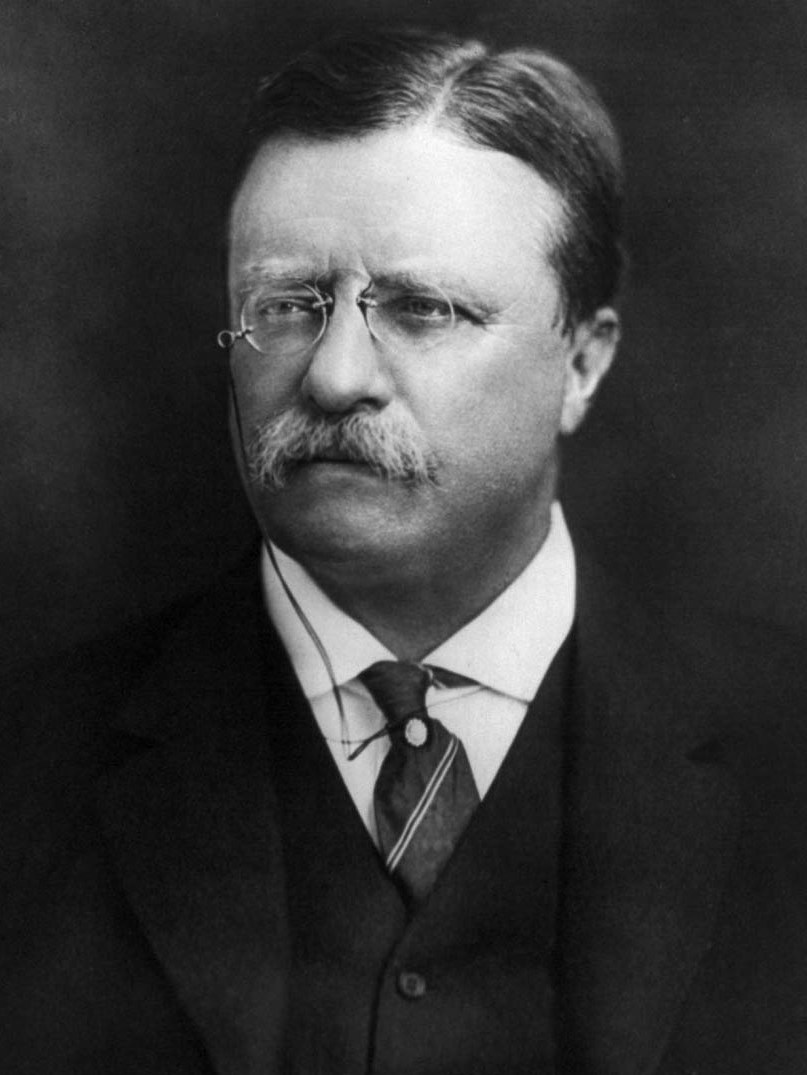

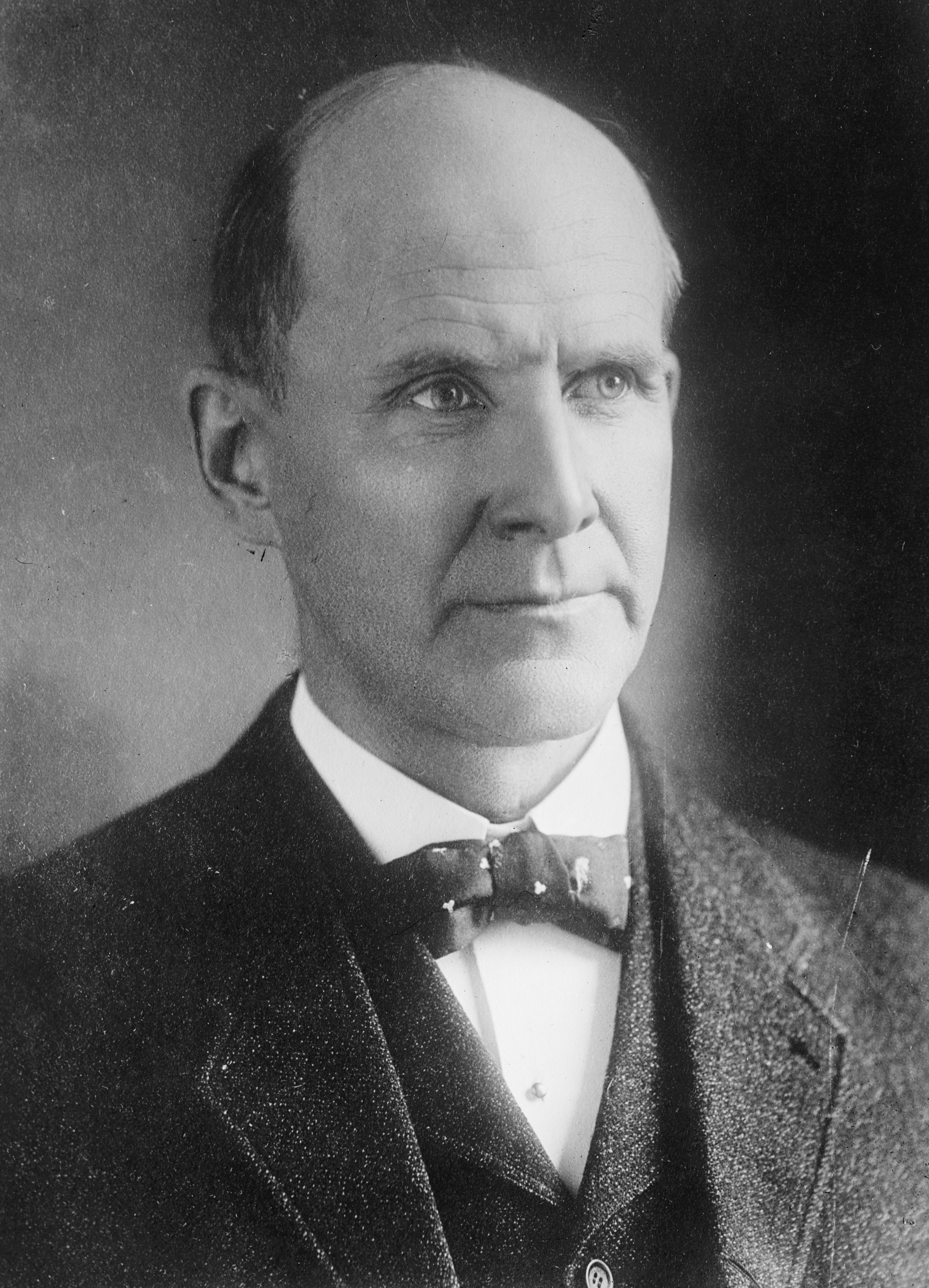
Nominee	Woodrow Wilson	William Howard Taft
Party	Democratic	Republican
Home state	New Jersey	Ohio
Running mate	Thomas R. Marshall	Nicholas M. Butler
Electoral vote	4	0
Popular vote	33,921	32,810
Percentage	32.08%	31.02%
Nominee	Theodore Roosevelt	Eugene V. Debs
Party	Progressive (Bull Moose)	Socialist
Home state	New York	Indiana
Running mate	Hiram Johnson	Emil Seidel
Electoral vote	0	0
Popular vote	25,527	11,960
Percentage	24.14%	11.31%
County results
Wilson
30–40%
40–50%
Taft
30–40%
40–50%
50–60%
60–70%
Roosevelt
30–40%
President before election
William Howard Taft
Republican
Elected President
Woodrow Wilson
Democratic

The 1912 United States presidential election in Idaho took place on November 5, 1912, as part of the 1912 United States presidential election. State voters chose four representatives, or electors, to the Electoral College, who voted for president and vice president.

Idaho was won by New Jersey Governor Woodrow Wilson (D–Virginia), running with Indiana Governor Thomas R. Marshall, with 32.08 percent of the popular vote, against the 27th president of the United States William Howard Taft (R–Ohio), running with Columbia University President Nicholas Murray Butler, with 31.02 percent of the popular vote, the 26th president of the United States Theodore Roosevelt (P–New York), running with governor of California Hiram Johnson, with 24.14 percent of the popular vote and the five-time candidate of the Socialist Party of America for President of the United States Eugene V. Debs (S–Indiana), running with the first Socialist mayor of a major city in the United States Emil Seidel, with 11.31 percent of the popular vote.

Wilson's 32.08% of the popular vote is the smallest vote share by which any candidate has carried a state in any United States presidential election; slightly smaller than John Quincy Adams' 32.46% in Illinois in 1824, and Abraham Lincoln's 32.32% in California in 1860.

== Results ==
1912 United States presidential election in Idaho
Party	Candidate	Votes	%
Democratic	Woodrow Wilson	33,921	32.08%
Republican	William Howard Taft (incumbent)	32,810	31.02%
Progressive	Theodore Roosevelt	25,527	24.14%
Socialist	Eugene V. Debs	11,960	11.31%
Prohibition	Eugene Chafin	1,536	1.45%
Total votes		105,754	100.00%

=== Results by county ===
County	Woodrow Wilson Democratic		William Howard Taft Republican		Theodore Roosevelt Progressive "Bull Moose"		Eugene Victor Debs Socialist		Eugene Chafin Prohibition		Margin		Total votes cast
County	#	%	#	%	#	%	#	%	#	%	#	%	Total votes cast
Ada	2,569	25.71%	3,198	32.00%	3,512	35.14%	599	5.99%	116	1.16%	-314	-3.14%	9,994
Adams	417	27.76%	598	39.81%	292	19.44%	176	11.72%	19	1.26%	-181	-12.05%	1,502
Bannock	1,486	30.82%	2,316	48.04%	599	12.42%	412	8.55%	8	0.17%	-830	-17.22%	4,821
Bear Lake	916	36.73%	1,271	50.96%	274	10.99%	32	1.28%	1	0.04%	-355	-14.23%	2,494
Bingham	814	27.38%	1,440	48.44%	453	15.24%	266	8.95%	0	0.00%	-626	-21.06%	2,973
Blaine	996	36.24%	988	35.95%	371	13.50%	368	13.39%	25	0.91%	8	0.29%	2,748
Boise	743	33.53%	651	29.38%	504	22.74%	303	13.67%	15	0.68%	92	4.15%	2,216
Bonner	1,055	25.56%	711	17.23%	1,247	30.22%	1,058	25.64%	56	1.36%	-189	-4.58%	4,127
Bonneville	864	28.44%	1,176	38.71%	628	20.67%	350	11.52%	20	0.66%	-312	-10.27%	3,038
Canyon	2,432	29.38%	1,842	22.25%	2,846	34.38%	848	10.24%	311	3.76%	-414	-5.00%	8,279
Cassia	846	26.76%	1,459	46.16%	471	14.90%	365	11.55%	20	0.63%	-613	-19.40%	3,161
Clearwater	549	34.90%	373	23.71%	345	21.93%	284	18.05%	22	1.40%	176	11.19%	1,573
Custer	501	42.14%	326	27.42%	236	19.85%	122	10.26%	4	0.34%	175	14.72%	1,189
Elmore	536	34.99%	415	27.09%	382	24.93%	190	12.40%	9	0.59%	121	7.90%	1,532
Fremont	1,911	27.81%	3,071	44.70%	1,128	16.42%	750	10.92%	11	0.16%	-160	-16.89%	6,871
Idaho	1,679	39.19%	989	23.09%	932	21.76%	633	14.78%	51	1.19%	690	16.10%	4,284
Kootenai	2,506	34.81%	1,690	23.47%	1,805	25.07%	1,030	14.31%	169	2.35%	701	9.74%	7,200
Latah	1,507	28.87%	904	17.32%	1,943	37.22%	588	11.26%	278	5.33%	-536	-8.35%	5,220
Lemhi	910	45.52%	669	33.47%	216	10.81%	198	9.90%	6	0.30%	241	12.05%	1,999
Lewis	1,131	44.02%	436	16.97%	694	27.01%	259	10.08%	49	1.91%	437	17.01%	2,569
Lincoln	1,541	30.29%	1,191	23.41%	1,645	32.34%	642	12.62%	68	1.34%	-104	-2.05%	5,087
Nez Perce	1,619	38.86%	1,011	24.27%	1,064	25.54%	406	9.75%	66	1.58%	555	13.32%	4,166
Oneida	1,386	35.29%	2,373	60.41%	0	0.00%	145	3.69%	24	0.61%	-987	-25.12%	3,928
Owyhee	567	37.25%	515	33.84%	333	21.88%	94	6.18%	13	0.85%	52	3.41%	1,522
Shoshone	1,634	32.33%	1,399	27.68%	1,159	22.93%	834	16.50%	28	0.55%	235	4.65%	5,054
Twin Falls	1,741	32.55%	1,074	20.08%	1,650	30.85%	781	14.60%	102	1.91%	91	1.70%	5,348
Washington	1,065	37.25%	724	25.32%	798	27.91%	227	7.94%	45	1.57%	267	9.34%	2,859
Totals	33,921	32.08%	32,810	31.02%	25,527	24.14%	11,960	11.31%	1,536	1.45%	1,111	1.06%	105,754

== See also ==
- United States presidential elections in Idaho
