= Seven Devils Mountains =

Mountain peaks in Idaho, United States

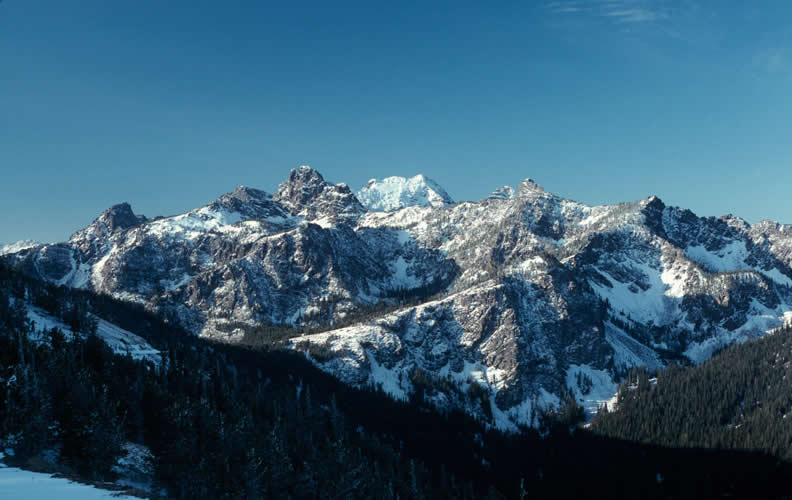
- U.S. Forest Service photo

Highest point
- Peak: He Devil
- Elevation: 9,393 ft (2,863 m)
- Prominence: 5,200 feet (1,585 m)
- Coordinates: 45°19′N 116°33′W

Dimensions
- Length: 84 mi (135 km) N/S
- Width: 29 mi (47 km) E/W
- Area: 1,289 mi^{2} (3,340 km^{2})

Geography
- Location within Idaho Location within the United States
- Country: United States
- State: Idaho
- Parent range: Rocky Mountains

The Seven Devils Mountains are notable peaks in the western United States, located in west central Idaho in the Hells Canyon Wilderness. They are above the east bank of the Snake River, which forms the Idaho-Oregon border.

The Seven Devils are part of the Rocky Mountains, and the tallest peaks are 7,900 vertical feet (2,410 m) above the adjacent river, with few trees in between. There are several marked and unmarked trails and cleared camping areas throughout the mountains. It has several waterfalls and streams as well as numerous lakes.

Immediately southwest of Riggins, the Seven Devils are accessible from U.S. Highway 95 by a gravel road which climbs over 5,500 vertical feet (1,680 m) in seventeen miles (27 km).

== Ecology ==
The Seven Devils contains a wide variety of wildlife such as bighorn sheep, mountain goat, mule deer, elk, black bear, cougar, cutthroat and rainbow trout. There are several lakes with high fish populations and there are numerous wild flowers. The Seven Devils has numerous sub-alpine meadows and vast pine forests.

== Peaks ==
An incomplete list of peaks of the Seven Devils Mountains
Mountain Peak	Elevation	Prominence	Isolation	Location
He Devil	9,393 ft 2863 m	5,200 ft 1585 m	0.38 mi 0.61 km	45.324135°N 116.548418°W
She Devil	9,380 ft 2859 m	518 ft 158 m	31.5 mi 50.6 km	45.323996°N 116.540596°W
Devils Throne	9,281 ft 2829 m	682 ft 208 m	1.11 mi 1.78 km	45.308791°N 116.554899°W
Tower of Babel	9,268 ft 2825 m	200 ft 61 m	0.73 mi 1.17 km	45.330067°N 116.528399°W
The Ogre	9,255 ft 2821 m	535 ft 163 m	0.52 mi 0.83 km	45.319545°N 116.532146°W
Mount Baal	9,160 ft 2792 m	121 ft 37 m	0.36 mi 0.58 km	45.326203°N 116.533349°W
Mount Belial	9,140 ft 2786 m	161 ft 49 m	0.57 mi 0.91 km	45.315827°N 116.548997°W
Twin Imps	8,999 ft 2743 m	480 ft 146 m	unknown	45.2992°N 116.5649°W
The Goblin	8,980 ft 2737 m	187 ft 57 m	0.35 mi 0.57 km	45.318332°N 116.525026°W
Monument Peak	8,957 ft 2730 m	1,381 ft 421 m	5.68 mi 9.14 km	45.226625°N 116.558096°W
Casey Mountain	8,799 ft 2682 m	800 ft 244 m	unknown	45.2256°N 116.5983°W
Jackley Mountain	8,799 ft 2682 m	931 ft 284 m	unknown	45.2486°N 116.5218°W
Pyramid Mountain	8,701 ft 2652 m	400 ft 122 m	unknown	45.2880°N 116.5722°W
White Mountain	8,501 ft 2591 m	534 ft 163 m	unknown	45.1837°N 116.5898°W
Black Imp	8,399 ft 2560 m	180 ft 55 m	unknown	45.2377°N 116.5623°W
Emmett Mountain	8,399 ft 2560 m	440 ft 134 m	unknown	45.2065°N 116.6117°W
Carbonate Hill	8,100 ft 2469 m	466 ft 142 m	unknown	45.2575°N 116.5759°W
Granite Mountain	7,999 ft 2438 m	440 ft 134 m	unknown	45.2742°N 116.6069°W

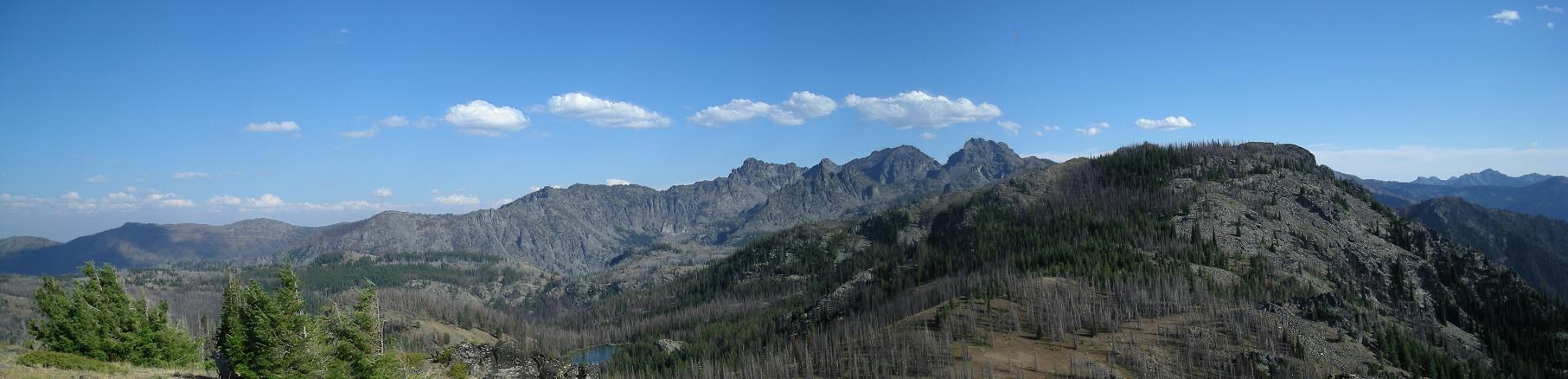
The Seven Devils from Dry Diggins Lookout
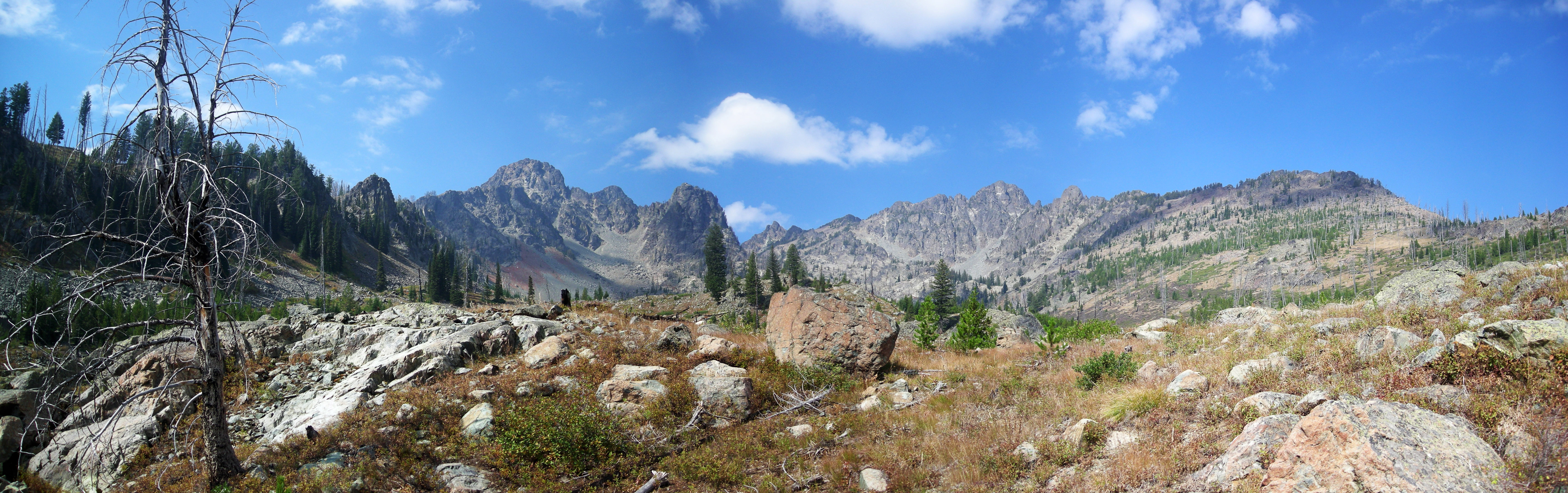
The Seven Devils looking from the east.
