= Hells Canyon Wilderness (Oregon and Idaho) =

Wilderness area in Idaho and Oregon

- IUCN category Ib (wilderness area)
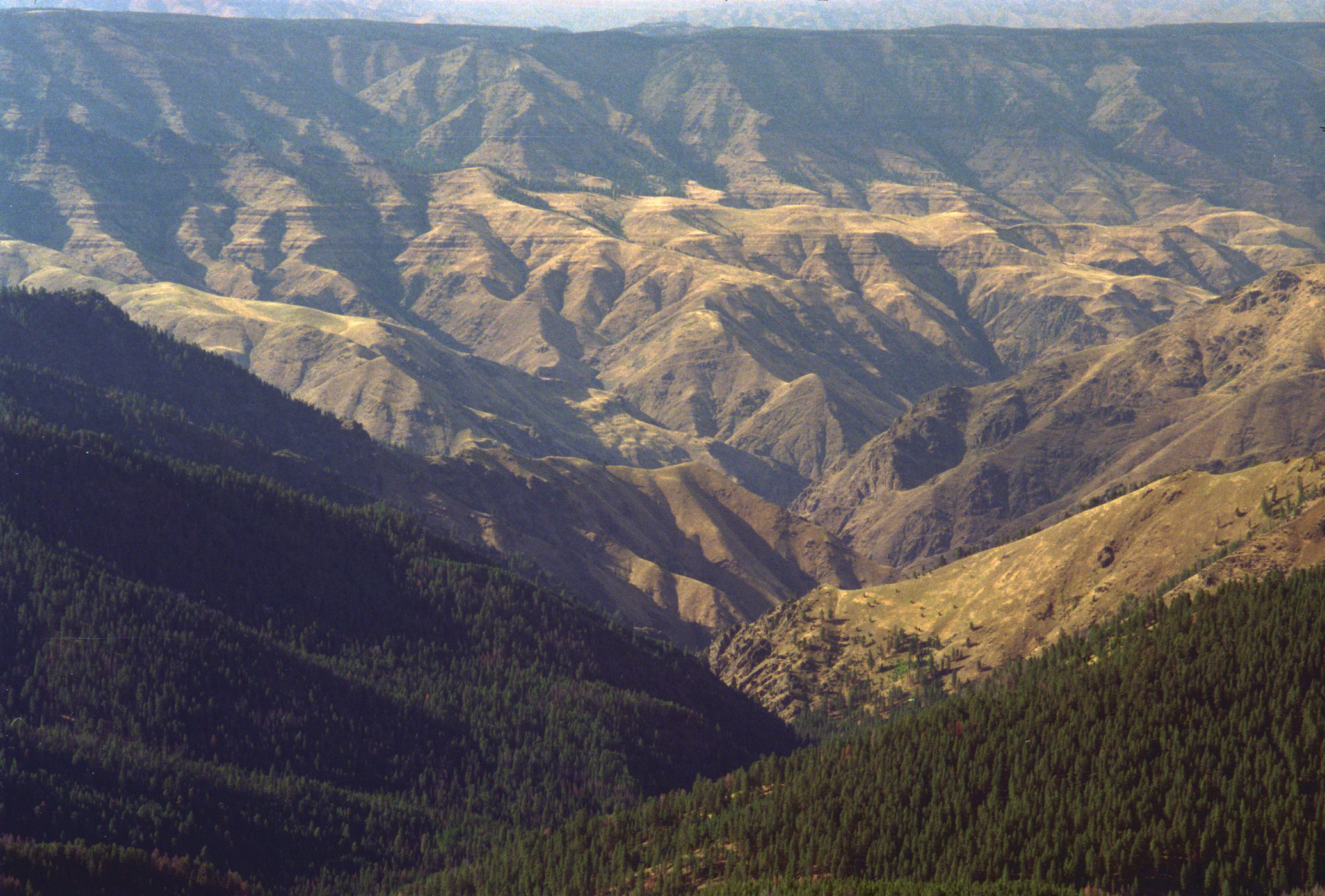
- From Heaven's Gate Overlook, near Riggins, Idaho

- Location within the United States
- Location: Wallowa County, Oregon; Idaho & Adams Counties, Idaho, U.S.
- Nearest city: Grangeville, Idaho
- Coordinates: 45.549°N 116.501°W
- Area: 217,927 acres (881.92 km^{2})
- Established: 1975, 51 years ago
- Governing body: U.S. Forest Service, Bureau of Land Management

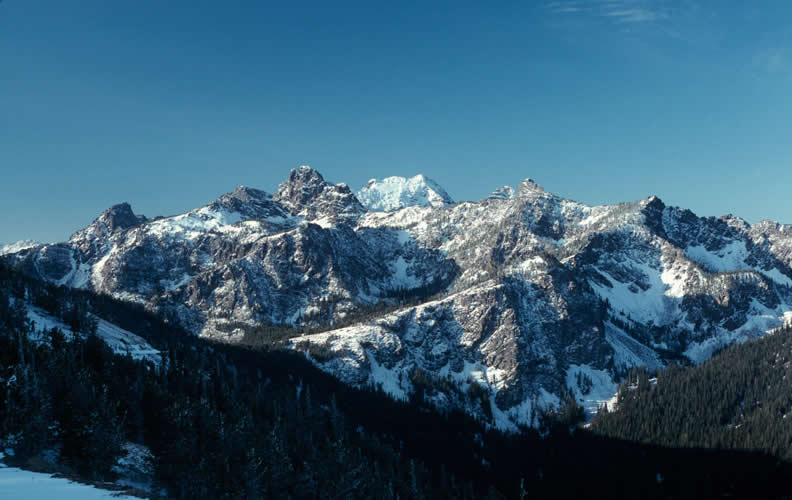
Seven Devils Mountains in Idaho

The Hells Canyon Wilderness is a wilderness area in the western United States, in Idaho and Oregon. Created 51 years ago in 1975, the Wilderness is managed by both the U.S. Bureau of Land Management and the U.S. Forest Service and contains some of the most spectacular sections of the Snake River as it winds its way through Hells Canyon, North America's deepest river gorge and one of the deepest gorges on Earth. The Oregon Wilderness Act of 1984 added additional acreage and currently the area protects a total area of 217,927 acres (88,192 ha). It lies entirely within the Hells Canyon National Recreation Area except for a small 946-acre (383 ha) plot in southeastern Wallowa County, Oregon which is administered by the Bureau of Land Management. The area that is administered by the Forest Service consists of portions of (in descending order of acreage) the Wallowa, Nez Perce, Payette, and Whitman National Forests.

== Topography ==
The Oregon portion of Hells Canyon Wilderness is characterized by two steep breakland areas in excess of 60 percent paralleling the Snake River. These are separated by a benchland at mid-elevation between the river and canyon rim between Saddle Creek and Dug Bar. The dominant vegetation is native bunchgrasses and shrubs. Trees are scattered throughout the Oregon side of the Wilderness, but concentrated on north-facing slopes and in stream bottoms - primarily ponderosa pine and Douglas fir. The three topographic provinces are dissected by many drainages including Saddle, Temperance, Salt, and Sluice Creeks.

The Idaho portion of Hells Canyon Wilderness is characterized by three geologic-vegetative regions. The upper areas are alpine and subalpine with several lakes and geologic formations of glacial origin. Vegetation is sparse and broken by large areas of rock. The middle portions contain dense forests of larch, lodgepole pine, and true firs. Lower elevations are characterized by dry, rocky, barren, steep slopes breaking into the Snake River and its major tributaries. Trees are sparse, consisting mostly of ponderosa pine and Douglas fir. This entire area is dissected by several major drainages including Sheep Creek, Granite Creek, and Deep Creek. The highest peaks are the Seven Devils Mountains, the tallest is "He Devil" at 9,393 feet (2,863 m) above sea level.

== Human history ==
Humans have historically used the Hells Canyon Wilderness area for farming, ranching and mining activities. Historically sheep and cattle have grazed this area of Northeastern Oregon since the 1730s as the Nez Perce grazed horses and cattle in the main canyons. By the 1800s homesteaders on the Oregon benchland were grazing sheep, cattle, and horses throughout the valley and canyons. Cattle grazing continues today in a small portion of the Wilderness, as permitted in the 1964 Wilderness Act, which allows some traditional activities to continue as long as wilderness values are not compromised. Some mining has also occurred, primarily on the Idaho side of the Wilderness.

== Vegetation ==
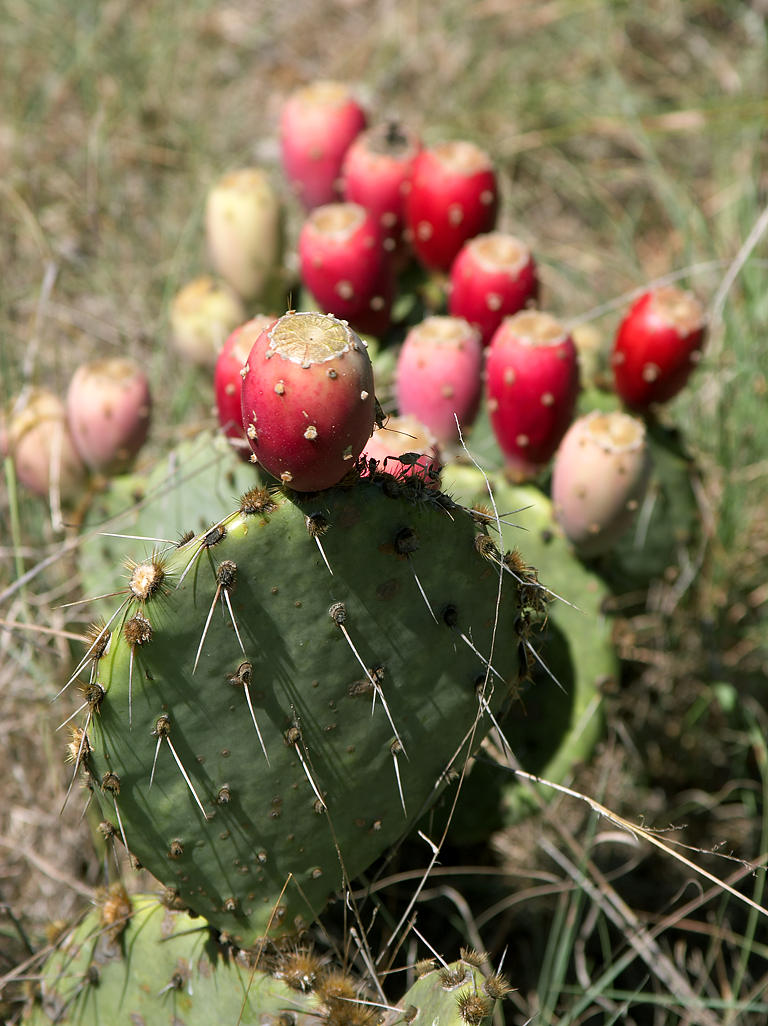
Prickly pear cactus.

A variety of vegetation grows in Hells Canyon Wilderness. Sagebrush and bunchgrass grow in lower parts of the canyon with deciduous bushes and trees along the numerous streams that run into Hells Canyon. Engelmann spruce and sub-alpine fir grow at the highest levels of the Wilderness, with western larch, Douglas fir, and ponderosa pine found between the two extremes. Prickly pear cactus and poison ivy are fairly common as well.

== Wildlife ==
Wildlife is abundant in Hells Canyon Wilderness. Black bear, cougar, elk, deer, mountain goat, chukar, and bighorn sheep are common. There have been reports, documented as recently as the late 1970s by local Forest Service and agriculture workers, of grizzly bears in the Wilderness. Wolves have established small packs in the area, and moose, peregrine falcon, bald and golden eagles can also be seen. Recent research has photodocumented the presence of wolverines.

== Wild and Scenic Rivers ==
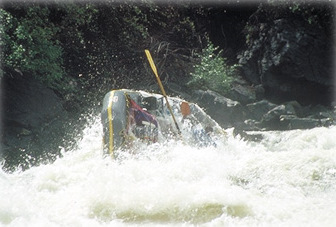
Rafting the Wild and Scenic Snake River.

Three National Wild and Scenic Rivers run through the Wilderness - the Snake, Imnaha, and Rapid rivers.

=== Snake River ===
66.9 miles (108 km) of the Snake River, from Hells Canyon Dam 35 miles (56 km) downstream, are designated Wild and Scenic. 32.5 miles (52 km) are designated "wild" and 34.4 miles (55 km) are designated "scenic".

=== Imnaha River ===
77 miles (124 km) of the Imnaha River from its headwaters are designated Wild and Scenic. The designation comprises the main stem from the confluence of the North and South Forks of the Imnaha River to its mouth, and the South Fork from its headwaters to the confluence with the main stem. In 1988, 15 miles (24 km) were designated "wild", 4 miles (6 km) were designated "scenic", and 58 miles (93 km) were designated "recreational", though only a portion of the Wild and Scenic Imnaha is located within Hells Canyon Wilderness.

=== Rapid River ===
26.8 miles (43 km) of Idaho's Rapid River from the headwaters of the main stem to the National Forest boundary, and the segment of the West Fork from the wilderness boundary to the confluence with the main stem, are designated "wild". The river contains three threatened fish species - chinook salmon, steelhead, and bull trout.

== Recreation ==
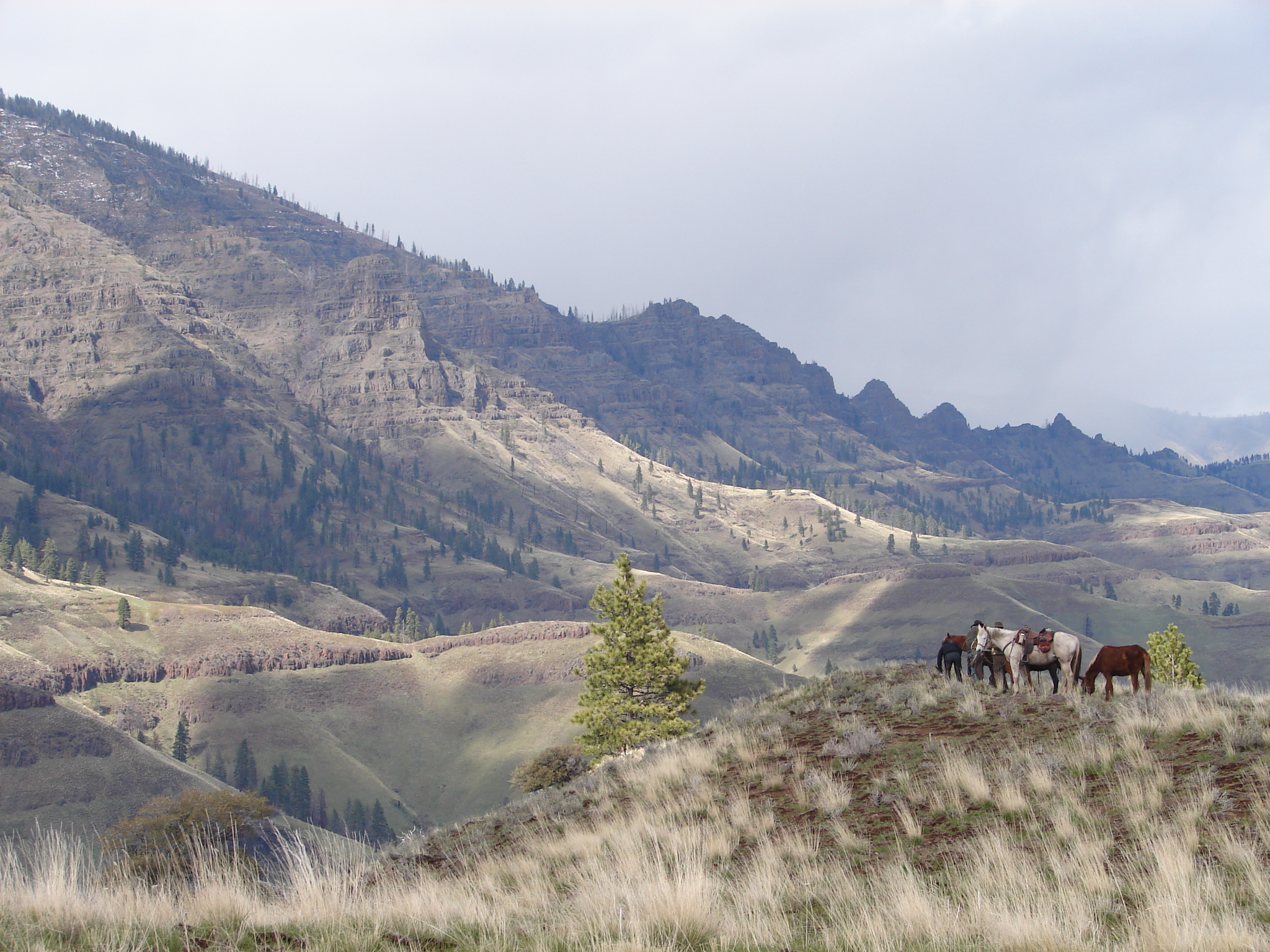
Horses in the wilderness

There are approximately 360 miles (580 km) of trails crossing Hells Canyon Wilderness. The extensive trail system mostly follows old Forest Service access routes to fires, and stock trails used by ranchers to move livestock to remote salting areas and watering holes. Many routes follow ridges and traverse moderate slopes and benchlands, while others climb steep slopes. These trails are extreme in difficulty, and any water sites should be viewed with skepticism, especially in mid summer to mid fall.

== Prohibited activities ==
U.S. Wilderness Areas do not allow motorized or mechanized vehicles, including bicycles. Although camping, hunting, and fishing are allowed with proper permit, no roads or buildings are constructed and there is no logging or mining, in compliance with the 1964 Wilderness Act.

== See also ==
- List of largest wilderness areas in the United States
- List of Oregon Wildernesses
- List of U.S. Wilderness Areas
- Wilderness Act
- Seven Devils Mountains
