= Idaho State Highway 13 =

State highway in Idaho County, Idaho, United States

State Highway 13
- SH-13 highlighted in red

Route information
- Maintained by ITD
- Length: 26.390 mi (42.471 km)
- Tourist routes: Northwest Passage Scenic Byway

Major junctions
- South end: US 95 in Grangeville
- North end: US 12 in Kooskia

Location
- Country: United States
- State: Idaho

Highway system
- Idaho State Highway System; Interstate; US; State
← US 12	→ SH-14

State Highway 13 (SH-13) is a state highway located entirely within Idaho County in North Central Idaho. SH-13 is 26 miles (42 km) long and runs from U.S. Route 95 (US 95) in Grangeville to US-12 in Kooskia. In addition to those cities, SH-13 also serves the city of Stites and the community of Harpster. SH-13 has one special route, Business Loop 13 in Kooskia.

== Route description ==
SH-13 begins at an intersection with US-95 in western Grangeville. It heads east through that city along Main Street. East of Grangeville, the highway heads generally northeast along the Harpster Grade Road, through the rolling farmland of Idaho County. Five miles (8.0 km) east of Grangeville, the terrain becomes mountainous as SH-13 begins a descent towards the South Fork Clearwater River. At the bottom of the 1,300-foot (400 m) descent is an intersection with SH-14 at the western banks of the river.

One-fifth mile (0.32 km) north of its intersection with SH-14, SH-13 crosses the South Fork Clearwater River and continues along the eastern banks. For the rest of its routing, SH-13 runs parallel to the river; a significant portion of which is within sight of the river. Since it lies at the bottom of the river valley, the road way is relatively flat, but it is surrounded by rugged, tree-lined hills. The highway passes through the communities of Harpster and Stites on its way towards Kooskia.

As it approaches Kooskia, the river valley widens allowing some space between the river and highway. It passes the city's municipal airport at the southern city limits. Now in the city, the road goes through its business district. The northern and southern halves of the city are separated by 1/4 mile (0.40 km) of SH-13. At Broadway, SH-13's only child route, State Highway 13 Business (SH-13 Bus.), turns off to the east. Shortly thereafter, the mainline SH-13 crosses the Middle Fork Clearwater River near the confluence of the south and middle forks. At the other side of the bridge, SH-13 ends at US 12.

== Major intersections ==
The entire route is in Idaho County.

Location	mi	km	Destinations	Notes
Grangeville	0.000	0.000	US 95 – Riggins, Boise, Lewiston	
	11.000	17.703	SH-14 – Elk City	
Kooskia	26.090	41.988	Broadway (SH-13 Bus.)	
Kooskia	26.390	42.471	US 12 – Kamiah, Lewiston, Missoula	
1.000 mi = 1.609 km; 1.000 km = 0.621 mi

== Related route ==
State Highway 13 Business
- Location: Kooskia
- Length: 0.824 mi (1,326 m)

SH-13 Business is an alternate connection between SH-13 and US-12 in Kooskia. It begins at an intersection with SH-13 in the northern half of the city and runs east along Broadway. It turns to the southeast before crossing the Middle Fork Clearwater River and ending at US-12. Travelers wishing to connect to eastbound US-12 from SH-13 can save over 4/5 mile (1.3 km) by using SH-13 Bus.

== See also ==
- List of state highways in Idaho
- List of highways numbered 13
