= Pollock, Idaho =

Unincorporated community in Idaho, United States

- Unincorporated community
- Location within Idaho Location within the United States
- Coordinates: 45°18′45″N 116°21′32″W
- Country: United States
- State: Idaho
- County: Idaho
- Elevation: 2,333 ft (711 m)
- Time zone: UTC-7 (Mountain (MST))
  - Summer (DST): UTC-6 (MDT)
- ZIP code: 83547
- Area codes: 208, 986
- GNIS feature ID: 397056

Pollock is an unincorporated community in Idaho County, Idaho, United States. Pollock is located on U.S. Route 95 7.5 miles (12.1 km) south-southwest of Riggins. Pollock has a post office with ZIP code 83547.
