= Golden, Idaho =

Unincorporated community in Idaho, United States

- Unincorporated community
- Location within Idaho Location within the United States
- Coordinates: 45°48′44″N 115°40′47″W
- Country: United States
- State: Idaho
- County: Idaho
- Elevation: 3,514 ft (1,071 m)
- Time zone: UTC-8 (Pacific (PST))
  - Summer (DST): UTC-7 (PDT)
- Area codes: 208, 986
- GNIS feature ID: 396570

Golden is an unincorporated community in Idaho County, Idaho, United States. Golden is located along Idaho State Highway 14 33 miles (53 km) east of Grangeville, the nearest city.

== History ==
Golden's population was estimated at 50 in 1960.
