= Salubria Lodge No. 31 =

- U.S. National Register of Historic Places
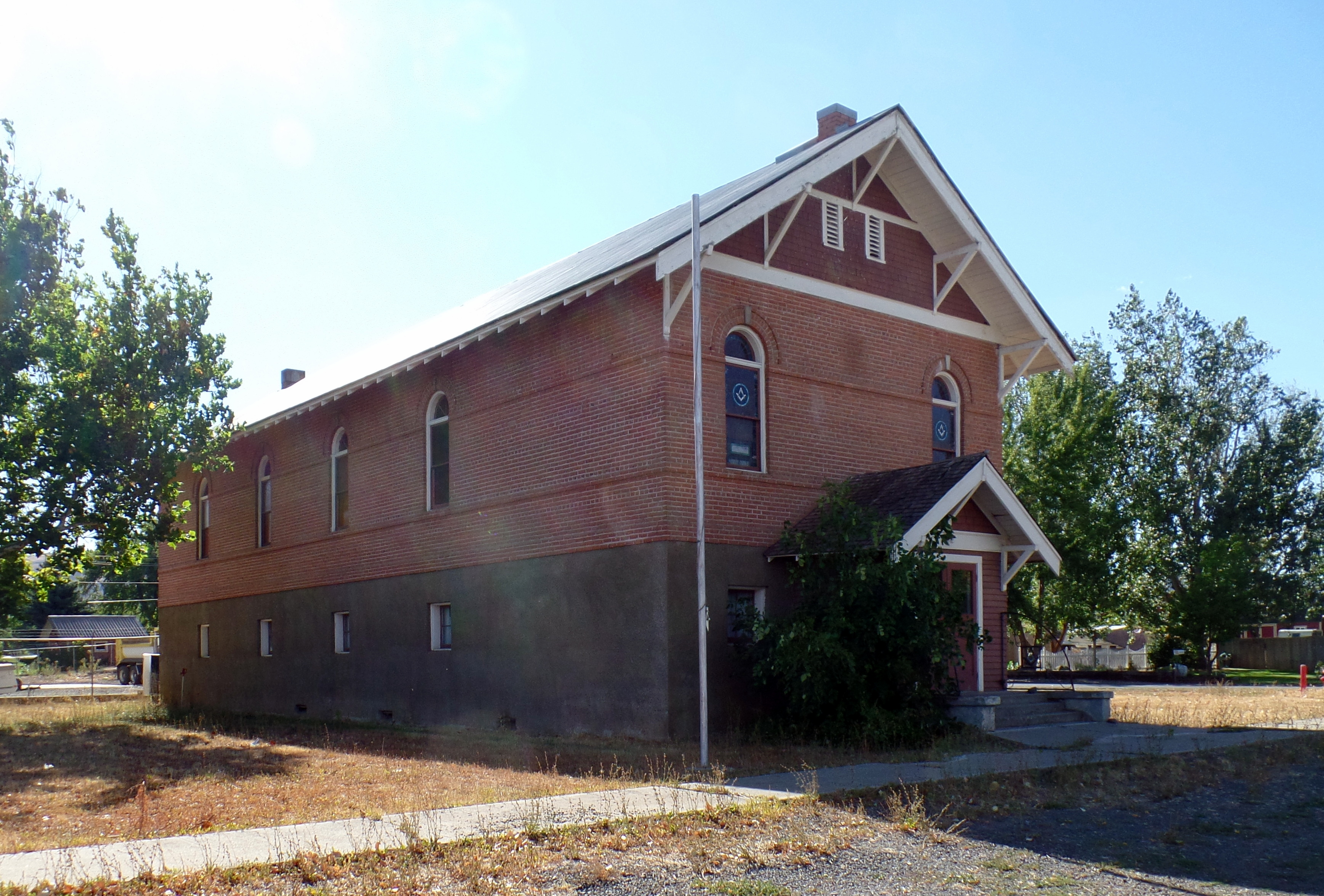

- Location within Idaho Location within the United States
- Location: 85 W. Central St. Cambridge, Idaho
- Coordinates: 44°34′23″N 116°40′36″W
- Area: Less than one acre
- Built: 1922; 104 years ago
- Architect: Watkins & Thompson
- NRHP reference No.: 90000368
- Added to NRHP: March 9, 1990

Salubria Lodge No. 31 is a historic Masonic building located at 85 W. Central Street in Cambridge, Washington County, Idaho, United States. Built in 1922 to replace an earlier meeting hall destroyed by fire, it is a two-story building made of red brick and concrete with a sloped roof over an attic space designed by Watkins & Thompson. Above the entrance are two stained glass windows depicting the emblem of the Masonic order. A metal roof covering has been added to protect the original wooden roof from heavy snowfall.

On March 9, 1990, the building was added to the National Register of Historic Places.

Salubria Lodge No. 31, an active lodge in the 9th Masonic District of the Grand Lodge of Idaho, still meets in the building. The lodge derives its name from the former town of Salubria, where it originated in 1893.
