= Idaho State Highway 14 =

State highway in Idaho County, Idaho, United States

State Highway 14
- SH-14 highlighted in red

Route information
- Maintained by ITD
- Length: 49.515 mi (79.687 km)

Major junctions
- West end: SH-13 near Grangeville
- East end: Airport Road in Elk City

Location
- Country: United States
- State: Idaho

Highway system
- Idaho State Highway System; Interstate; US; State
← SH-13	→ I-15

State Highway 14 is a state highway located entirely within Idaho County, Idaho.

== Route description ==
It runs 49.515 miles (79.687 km) from its western terminus at Idaho State Highway 13 near Grangeville to its eastern terminus at Sweeney Hill Road in unincorporated Elk City. SH-14 passes through two communities, Golden and Elk City. Its only junction with another numbered highway is at its western terminus at SH-13.

== Major intersections ==
The entire route is in Idaho County.

Location	mi	km	Destinations	Notes
	0.000	0.000	SH-13	
Elk City	49.515	79.687	Airport Road	Eastern terminus of SH-14
1.000 mi = 1.609 km; 1.000 km = 0.621 mi

== See also ==
- List of state highways in Idaho
- List of highways numbered 14
