= Syringa, Idaho =

Unincorporated community in Idaho County, Idaho, United States

- Location in the United States Location in Idaho
- Coordinates: 46°09′03″N 115°43′38″W
- Country: United States
- State: Idaho
- County: Idaho
- Elevation: 1,411 ft (430 m)
- Time zone: Pacific (UTC-8)
- ZIP code: 83539
- Area code: 208
- GNIS feature ID: 398211

Syringa (pronounced \sə-ˈriŋ-gə\) is an unincorporated community in the northwest United States in Idaho County, Idaho. Named for the shrub which grows in the area [Philadelphus lewisii], the state flower, it is in the Pacific Time Zone (UTC-8). At low elevation, the climate is mild, with an average annual precipitation exceeding 25 inches (65 cm).

== Geology ==
The town lies at the base of the Clearwater Mountains, a subset of the Rocky Mountains, along the banks of the Middle Fork of the Clearwater River (MFCR). The area is on the edge of the Idaho Batholith although the Columbia River Basalt Flows are mere miles to the west. Three creeks run into the MFCR within a mile of each other near Syringa: Little Smith Creek, Smith Creek, and Syringa Creek. The close proximity of the creek mouths forms a large alluvial plain surround by sylvan forests.

== History ==
The area is within the home territory of the Nez Perce people or Nimi’ipuu (Nee-me-poo), eleven miles (18 km) east of the current reservation boundary. The Lewis and Clark Corps of Discovery National Historical Trail, also known as the Northern Nez Perce Trail, is ten miles (16 km) directly north by air. In 1877, during the Nez Perce War, the Nez Perce crossed the trail as they fled the reservation in pursuit by General Oliver Howard.

Settlers moved into the area by the 1880s and homesteads were established in the early 1900s. Lumber was once the main industry but the focus is now on recreation and governmental land management. The Middle Fork Ranger station sat one mile to the west until 1939. The Great Fire of 1910, also known as the Great Burn, and the Pete King Fire of 1934 affected the area. The Woodrat Fire threatened the town in 2015.

== Geography ==
The Northwest Passage Scenic Byway (U.S. Route 12), one of three main east-to-west routes across Idaho, is the main access to Syringa. The town is within the Middle Fork Wild and Scenic River Corridor managed by the U.S. Forest Service. Clearwater National Forest and Nez Perce National Forest (administratively combined as Nez Perce-Clearwater National Forests) surround Syringa. The Selway Bitterroot Wilderness Area is to the east. Syringa is in Mountain View School District #244 and students are bussed to Kooskia, Idaho. Its area codes are 208 and 986.

=== Climate ===
The climate is similar to that of Kooskia, fifteen miles (25 km) west, but with a shorter growing season by a few days. The valley's low elevation and ridge alignment give Syringa a mild, moist climate. White and red fir, Western red cedar, and Ponderosa pine thrive in the area, while cottonwood trees grow near the creeks. Ferns and underbrush can become thick, especially on the northern slope faces.

== Additional reading ==
- 1. Idaho Place Names: A Geographical Dictionary, Lalia Boone, University of Idaho Press, Moscow, ID, 1988 pg367
- 2. Roadside Geology of Idaho, David D. Alt, Donald W. Hyndman, Mountain Press Publishing Co. Missoula MT 1993 pg 128
- 3. Major Fenn's Country: A history of the lower Lochsa, the lower Selway and the upper Middlefork of the Clearwater, and surrounding lands, Neal Parsell, Pacific Northwest National Parks and Forest Association, Seattle, WA, 1990
- Geographic Names Information System (GNIS)
