= Dixie, Idaho County, Idaho =

Unincorporated community in Idaho, United States

Dixie, Idaho
- Unincorporated community
- Location within Idaho Location within the United States
- Coordinates: 45°33′15″N 115°27′40″W
- Country: United States
- State: Idaho
- County: Idaho
- Elevation: 5,620 ft (1,710 m)
- Time zone: UTC-8 (Pacific (PST))
  - Summer (DST): UTC-7 (PDT)
- Area codes: 208, 986
- GNIS feature ID: 1802953

Dixie is an unincorporated community in Idaho County, Idaho, United States, located 43 miles (69 km) east-northeast of Riggins. Dixie was an important gateway to the Thunder Mountain Mines of Idaho during the early 1900s when Dixie was on the northern terminus of the Three Blaze Trail, a shortcut route to the mines via Campbell's Ferry, and what is now the Frank Church-River of No Return Wilderness, Chamberlain Basin, and southward to the mining community of Roosevelt, located on Monumental Creek.

== History ==
Dixie's population was 292 in 1909, and was 25 in 1960.

== Climate ==
Dixie has a dry summer continental subarctic climate (Dsc) according to the Köppen climate classification system.

Climate data for Dixie N, Idaho, 1991–2020 normals, 2008-2023 extremes: 5740ft (1750m)
Month	Jan	Feb	Mar	Apr	May	Jun	Jul	Aug	Sep	Oct	Nov	Dec	Year
Record high °F (°C)	47 (8)	53 (12)	64 (18)	70 (21)	83 (28)	94 (34)	93 (34)	93 (34)	89 (32)	88 (31)	74 (23)	48 (9)	94 (34)
Mean maximum °F (°C)	40.5 (4.7)	46.1 (7.8)	52.4 (11.3)	63.2 (17.3)	73.4 (23.0)	83.8 (28.8)	88.0 (31.1)	87.6 (30.9)	82.3 (27.9)	70.9 (21.6)	55.2 (12.9)	40.5 (4.7)	89.4 (31.9)
Mean daily maximum °F (°C)	30.7 (−0.7)	33.0 (0.6)	38.4 (3.6)	45.5 (7.5)	56.7 (13.7)	64.5 (18.1)	75.9 (24.4)	75.6 (24.2)	65.3 (18.5)	52.1 (11.2)	35.8 (2.1)	27.7 (−2.4)	50.1 (10.1)
Daily mean °F (°C)	17.8 (−7.9)	20.4 (−6.4)	25.5 (−3.6)	32.9 (0.5)	42.6 (5.9)	49.5 (9.7)	57.3 (14.1)	56.0 (13.3)	48.2 (9.0)	37.9 (3.3)	24.8 (−4.0)	16.6 (−8.6)	35.8 (2.1)
Mean daily minimum °F (°C)	4.9 (−15.1)	7.8 (−13.4)	12.7 (−10.7)	20.4 (−6.4)	28.5 (−1.9)	34.5 (1.4)	38.6 (3.7)	36.3 (2.4)	31.1 (−0.5)	23.7 (−4.6)	13.8 (−10.1)	5.5 (−14.7)	21.5 (−5.8)
Mean minimum °F (°C)	−16.7 (−27.1)	−16.5 (−26.9)	−8.3 (−22.4)	2.1 (−16.6)	17.9 (−7.8)	26.4 (−3.1)	30.0 (−1.1)	28.8 (−1.8)	21.8 (−5.7)	8.8 (−12.9)	−4.8 (−20.4)	−17.0 (−27.2)	−21.3 (−29.6)
Record low °F (°C)	−31 (−35)	−32 (−36)	−29 (−34)	−13 (−25)	8 (−13)	23 (−5)	27 (−3)	24 (−4)	16 (−9)	−14 (−26)	−25 (−32)	−25 (−32)	−32 (−36)
Average precipitation inches (mm)	3.80 (97)	3.58 (91)	3.05 (77)	3.25 (83)	3.10 (79)	2.79 (71)	1.15 (29)	0.88 (22)	1.40 (36)	2.27 (58)	3.57 (91)	4.79 (122)	33.63 (856)
Average snowfall inches (cm)	42.6 (108)	37.1 (94)	30.6 (78)	15.0 (38)	2.4 (6.1)	0.6 (1.5)	0.0 (0.0)	0.0 (0.0)	0.6 (1.5)	8.3 (21)	24.0 (61)	43.2 (110)	204.4 (519.1)
Average extreme snow depth inches (cm)	46.7 (119)	55.1 (140)	52.8 (134)	41.3 (105)	18.8 (48)	0.8 (2.0)	0.0 (0.0)	0.0 (0.0)	0.3 (0.76)	5.1 (13)	12.9 (33)	31.7 (81)	59.1 (150)
Source 1: NOAA
Source 2: XMACIS2 (records, monthly max/mins, 2009-2023 snowfall/depth)

== Transportation ==
=== Airports ===
The following public-use airports are located near Dixie

- Dixie USFS Airport (A05)
- Wilson Bar USFS Airport (C48)
