= Hailey Masonic Lodge =

- U.S. National Register of Historic Places
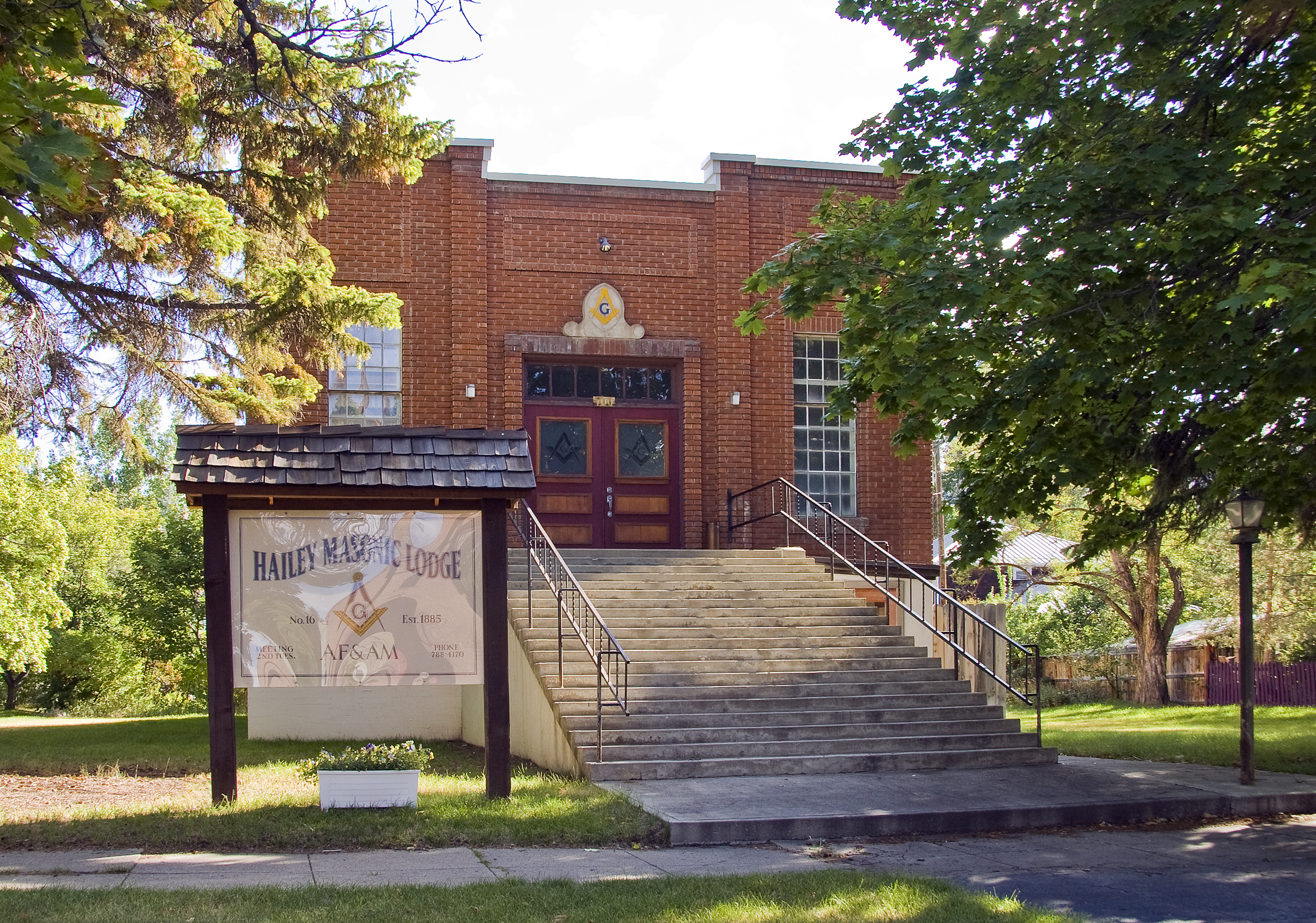

- Location within Idaho Location within the United States
- Location: 100 S. 2nd Ave., Hailey, Idaho
- Coordinates: 43°31′13.95″N 114°18′44.81″W
- Area: less than one acre
- Built: 1937
- Built by: John M. Rutter
- Architectural style: Masonic Temple
- NRHP reference No.: 08000869
- Added to NRHP: September 12, 2008

The Hailey Masonic Lodge refers to a historic building, which was built in 1937 in Hailey, Idaho. The building was constructed as a meeting hall for Hailey Lodge No. 16, a local chapter of the Freemasons. It was listed on the National Register of Historic Places in 2008.

"The National Register designation was awarded for the building's sustained use as a gathering place for leaders of the community, as well as for its architectural significance."

The building is a one-story brick building "covered in red brick brought from Salt Lake City. An arched medallion with the Masonic square and compass is centered over the double-door entryway." The interior includes a dais, a podium, a kneeler and other accoutrements. It includes 20 portraits of past Lodge Masters. The property includes two spruce trees flanking the front entranceway, and, along Bullion Street, mature maple trees.

Hailey Lodge No. 16 was formed in 1884. It grew from 11 men to a peak of 225 during World War I or II. Its first hall was destroyed in 1889 in a fire that burned most of Hailey. Its second hall was also destroyed by fire, in 1927.

The current hall was built in 1937 by John M. (Jack) Rutter, a Mason originally from England, who also built many other Hailey buildings including "The Liberty Theatre, Rialto Hotel, Guyer Hot Springs hotel and pool, St. Thomas Episcopal Church, St. Charles Parish Hall, the Christiana Club, Blaine Manor and Hailey Medical Center, the Harris Block furniture store and apartments and even Hailey’s city water system" over a 70-year career.

It was still a Masonic meetingplace in 2010.
