= Campbell's Ferry =

- U.S. National Register of Historic Places
- U.S. Historic district
- Location within Idaho Location within the United States
- Nearest city: Riggins, Idaho
- Coordinates: 45°29′11″N 115°20′3″W
- Area: 31.1 acres (12.6 ha)
- Built: 1898
- NRHP reference No.: 07000037
- Added to NRHP: February 8, 2007

Campbell's Ferry was a ferry crossing on the Salmon River, located at Mile 148 of the river in the Frank Church-River of No Return Wilderness. The ferry was part of the Three Blaze Trail, which connected Grangeville to Dixie, Idaho, to the Monumental Creek Trail at Thunder Mountain. William Campbell (and William Allen Stonebreaker were awarded the contract to construct the Three Blaze Trail) established the trail and ferry in 1898, as well the Campbell's Ferry Ranch on the south bank of the river; Campbell was also the ferry's first operator. Campbell disappeared and was presumed dead in the winter of 1902–03, and the ranch and ferry passed through a succession of owners until Joe and Emma Zaunmiller acquired the property. Emma died in 1938 in a horseback riding accident, and Joe eventually married ranch hand Lydia Frances Coyle. Frances successfully promoted the construction of a bridge to replace the ferry crossing, which was completed in 1956; the couple ceremonially let the ferryboat float away downriver.

Campbell's Ferry was added to the National Register of Historic Places on February 8, 2007.

== Climate ==
Climate data for Campbell's Ferry, Idaho
Month	Jan	Feb	Mar	Apr	May	Jun	Jul	Aug	Sep	Oct	Nov	Dec	Year
Record high °F (°C)	55 (13)	66 (19)	78 (26)	92 (33)	97 (36)	102 (39)	110 (43)	107 (42)	103 (39)	88 (31)	70 (21)	54 (12)	110 (43)
Mean daily maximum °F (°C)	34.8 (1.6)	43.1 (6.2)	53.1 (11.7)	62.3 (16.8)	69.1 (20.6)	79.9 (26.6)	90.7 (32.6)	91.6 (33.1)	77.7 (25.4)	61.2 (16.2)	44.6 (7.0)	34.5 (1.4)	61.9 (16.6)
Mean daily minimum °F (°C)	17.6 (−8.0)	23.1 (−4.9)	29.1 (−1.6)	34.0 (1.1)	40.4 (4.7)	46.5 (8.1)	51.8 (11.0)	51.5 (10.8)	43.6 (6.4)	34.1 (1.2)	26.6 (−3.0)	20.8 (−6.2)	34.9 (1.6)
Record low °F (°C)	−18 (−28)	−10 (−23)	13 (−11)	23 (−5)	26 (−3)	32 (0)	38 (3)	34 (1)	26 (−3)	21 (−6)	−3 (−19)	−15 (−26)	−18 (−28)
Average precipitation inches (mm)	1.49 (38)	1.68 (43)	1.91 (49)	2.06 (52)	3.17 (81)	2.77 (70)	1.54 (39)	1.13 (29)	2.18 (55)	1.78 (45)	1.89 (48)	2.41 (61)	24.01 (610)
Average snowfall inches (cm)	18.3 (46)	10.9 (28)	5.4 (14)	1.9 (4.8)	0.0 (0.0)	0.0 (0.0)	0.0 (0.0)	0.0 (0.0)	0.0 (0.0)	0.3 (0.76)	6.3 (16)	20.3 (52)	63.4 (161.56)
