= Three Blaze Trail =

Historic trail in Idaho, United States

The Three Blaze Trail is an Historic Trail constructed in 1902 in Idaho, United States. The trail was located and constructed by William Stonebreaker, William Campbell, Harry Donohue, and August Hotzel as a "shortcut" route from Dixie, Idaho, to the Thunder Mountain mining area in central Idaho. The Three Blaze Trail and the Thunder Mountain mining district lie within the Frank Church-River of No Return Wilderness. While there were already at least four existing routes into Thunder Mountain, the local miners and business men of the area raised $3,000 and contracted the four builders to locate and construct the shorter route.

== Overview ==
The Three Blaze Trail has been studied and determined to be included as a "trail of historical significance" by the United States Department of Agriculture, Forest Service, planning process. Environmental Impact Statements continue to list the trail as an object of concern that requires evaluation and consideration of its heritage and its historic value. This trail, constructed in 1902 has historical, recreational, health, and scenic values which may qualify it for the designation of either a National Recreation Trail (NRT) or National Historic Trail as defined by the National Trail System Act.

The route to the Thunder Mountain Mines began at Grangeville, Idaho, and progressed to Dixie, Idaho, on a previously established (by 1901) wagon route. By 1894 the section of the route from Grangeville to Elk City was an improved wagon road. From Dixie, the route followed an existing trail to the Salmon River, a distance of about 12 miles, and intersected the Salmon River at Campbell's Ferry, which was established near the mouth of Trout Creek. This section of the trail is currently part of the Nez Perce National Forest Trail System, Trail Number 231, which begins near the Dillinger Mine Trail Head, down Rhett Creek, over the ridge near Rock Rabbit Point, and then down to the Salmon River.

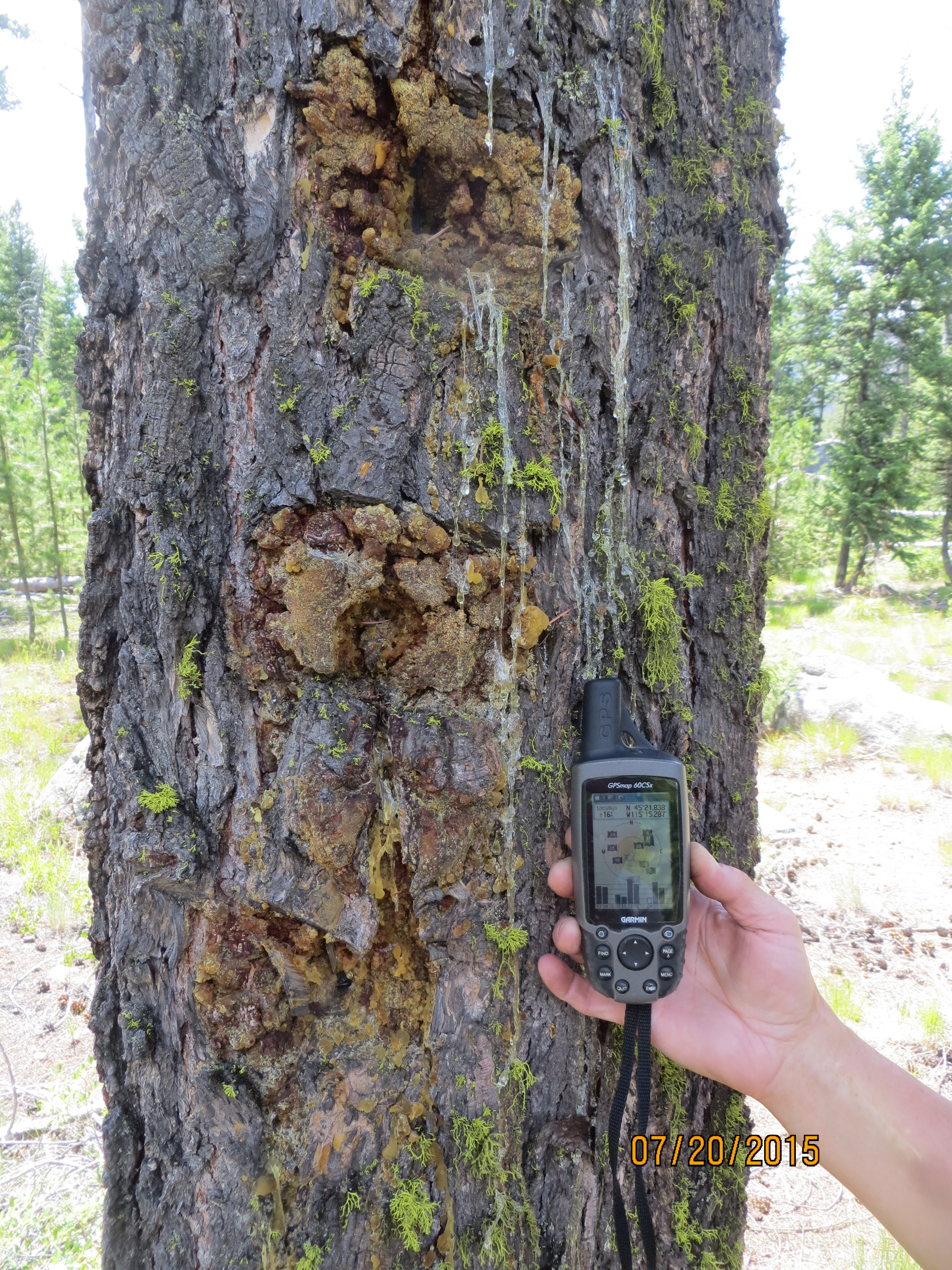
All that is left of three hatchet slash blazes made in 1902 (2015)

The newly constructed (1902) Three Blaze "shortcut" Trail was located and marked with three distinctive blazes, or marks, cut on the trees, usually with an axe, to signify this specific route.

Three blazes were used, which was different than the common two blaze system used by the U.S. Forest Service. The two-blaze system consisted of a lower 8 inch-long dash with an upper short dot above as explained in "Trail Construction of the National Forests", U.S. Department of Agriculture, Washington Government Printing Office, 1915. The two blaze dot and dash was the more common method to blaze trees as used by the U.S. Forest Service to mark trails until discontinued in the 1980s. The Three Blaze Trail is now part of the National Forest Service Trail System, part of which are numbered Trails 017 and 006, on the Payette National Forest. The trail is no longer maintained as demonstrated by the photo showing the trail clogged with downed timber.

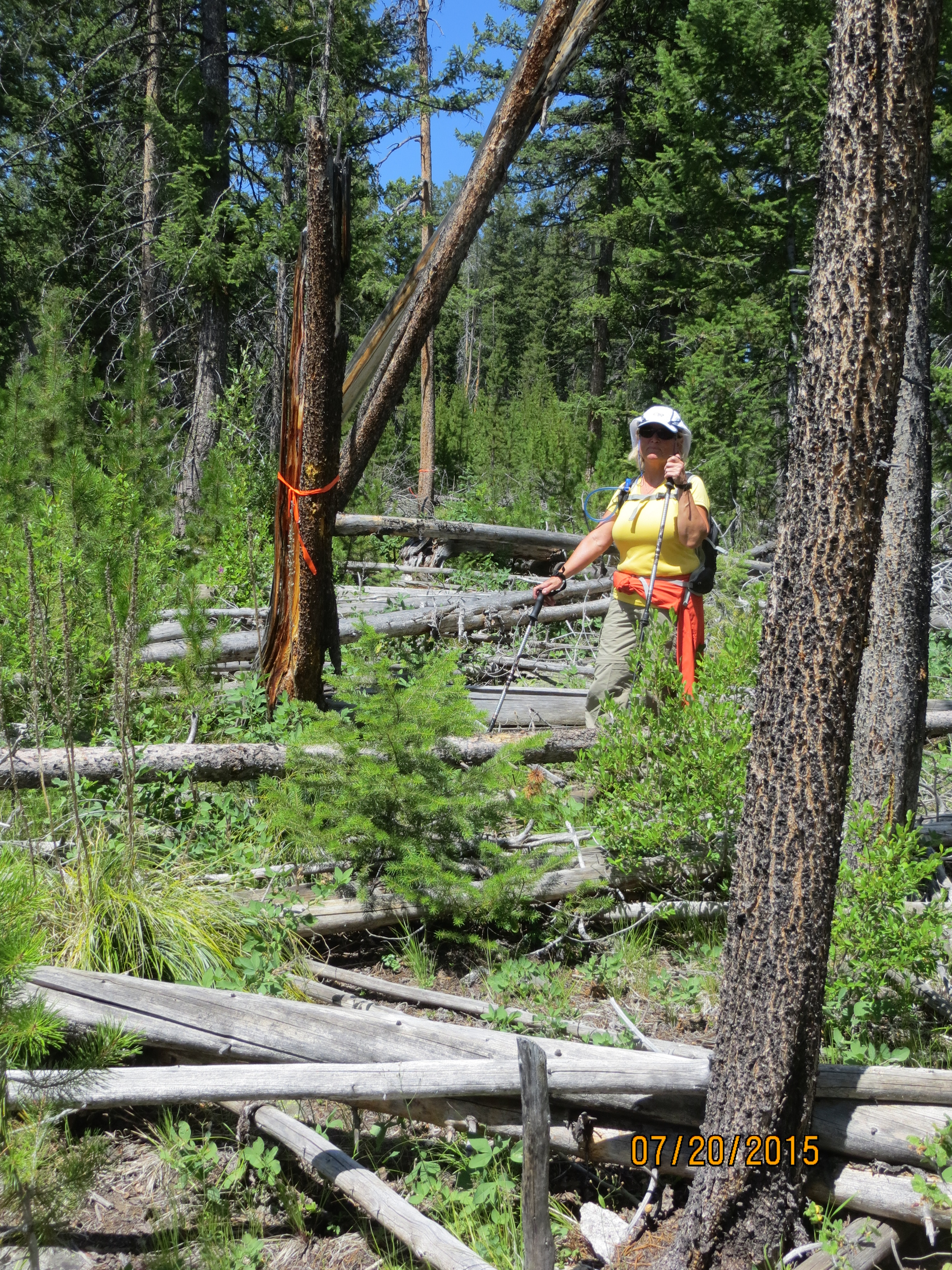
Trail showing downed trees 2015

The Three Blaze Trail began at Campbell's Ferry, near the mouth of Trout Creek, traversed up the ridge near Little Trout Creek to Wet Meadows, then follows the Highline Ridge to Upper Trout Creek Meadows. From Upper Trout Creek Meadows the trail dropped into Chamberlain Creek at the mouth of Moose Creek. From Moose Creek the Three Blaze Trail went to Moose Jaw Meadow, then climbed the slope towards the head of Lodgepole Creek and the top of Ramey Ridge. From near Hand Meadows, the trail followed Ramey Ridge southward, past Rock Rabbit Point, Dead Mule Peak, Ramey Spring, to Ramey Point. From Ramey Point, the trail followed the ridge-line and switched-backed down the steep slope to Copper Camp, on Big Creek, the southern terminus of the Three Blaze Trail (route taken from U.S. Forest Service maps and "CCC in Idaho Collection, Digital Initiatives, University of Idaho Library, William Allen Stonebreaker, Chamberlain Basin ranch". The total distance of the Three Blaze Trail is 41 miles.

The route from Copper Camp on Big Creek to the Thunder Mountain Mining area continued to follow an existing trail down Big Creek, from near the mouth of Copper Creek, downstream about 4 miles to Monumental Creek, then up-stream on Monumental Creek about 20 miles to the Thunder Mountain Mining area, and Roosevelt, Idaho. The total length of the route from Dixie, Idaho, to the Thunder Mountain Mining Area is 85 miles, as shown on Peter Preston's Three Blaze Trail vicinity map.

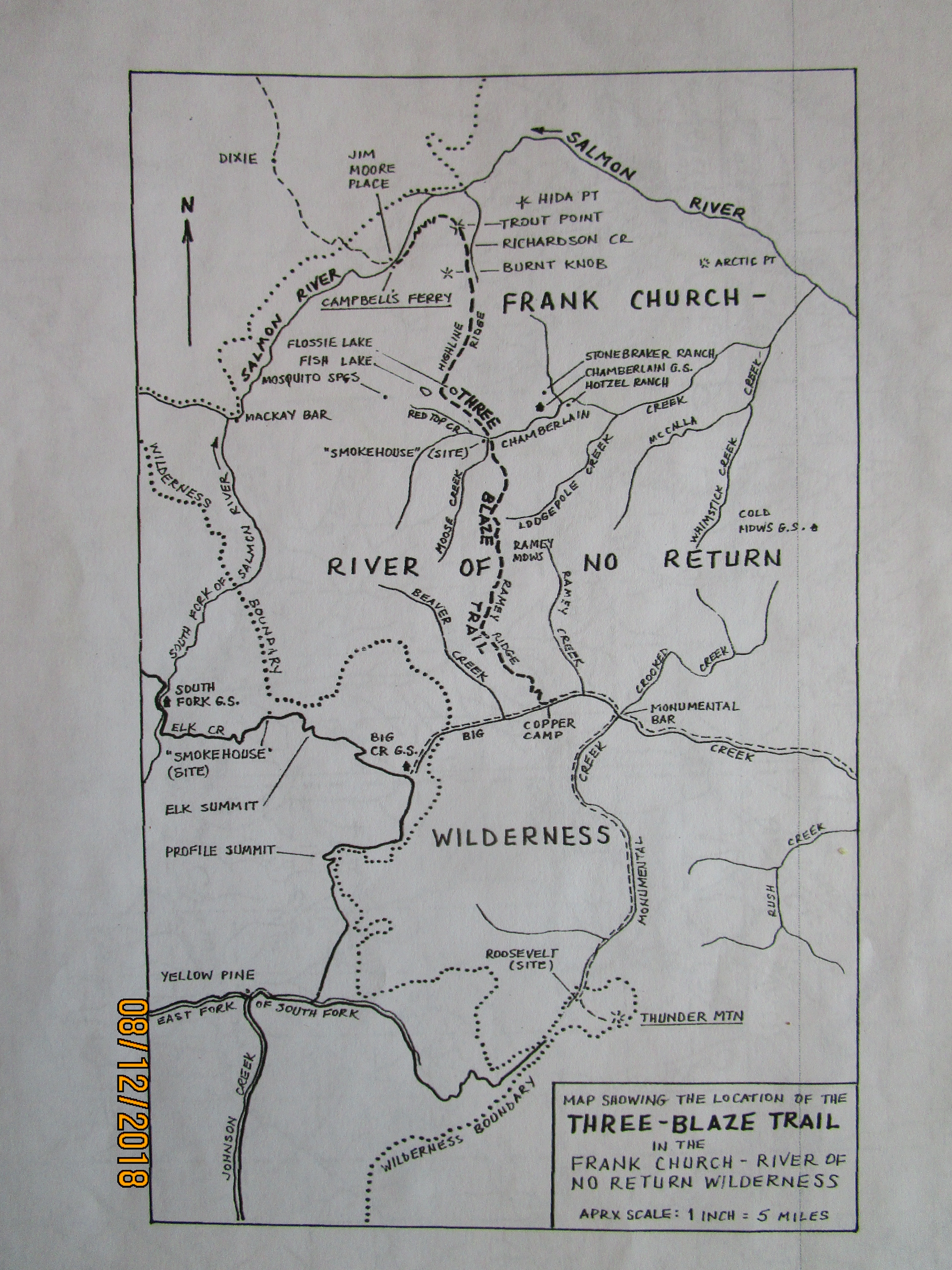
Three Blaze Trail Vicinity Map, Dixie, Idaho, to Thunder Mountain Mines

Idaho Centennial Trail: The Idaho Centennial Trail, designated in 1990, traverses Idaho on a north/south route totaling about 900 miles. A very small portion of that designated trail, from Campbell's Ferry to Wet Meadows/Shake Cabin, follows the Three Blaze Trail.

Trout Creek Bypass: A Forest Service map (the date of which needs to be confirmed) shows a trail from Campbell's Ferry up Trout Creek to Shake Cabin. Shake Cabin, which was located at Wet Meadows, no longer exists (as of 2018).

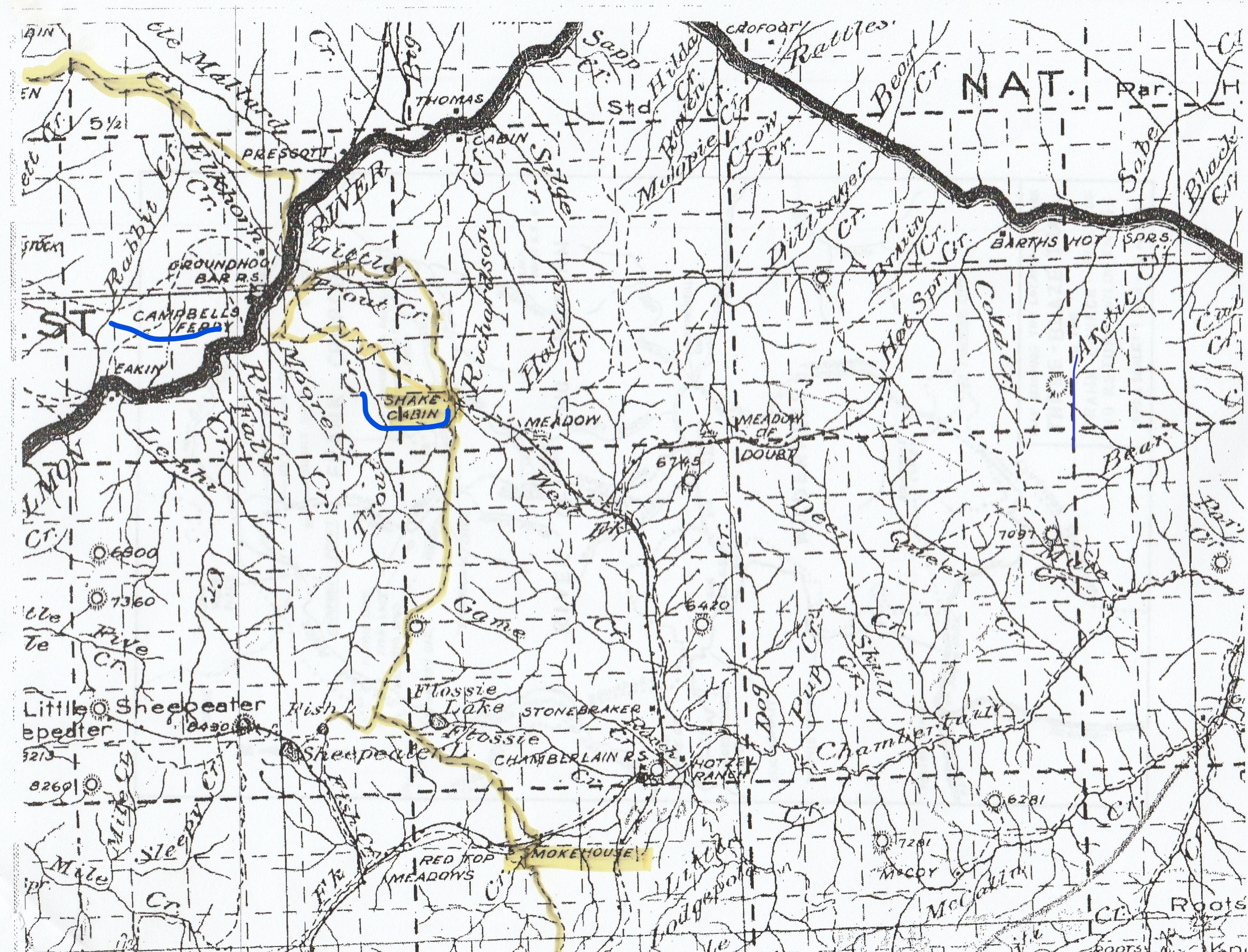
Possible original Trout Creek Trail Location
