= Florence, Idaho =

- Ghost town
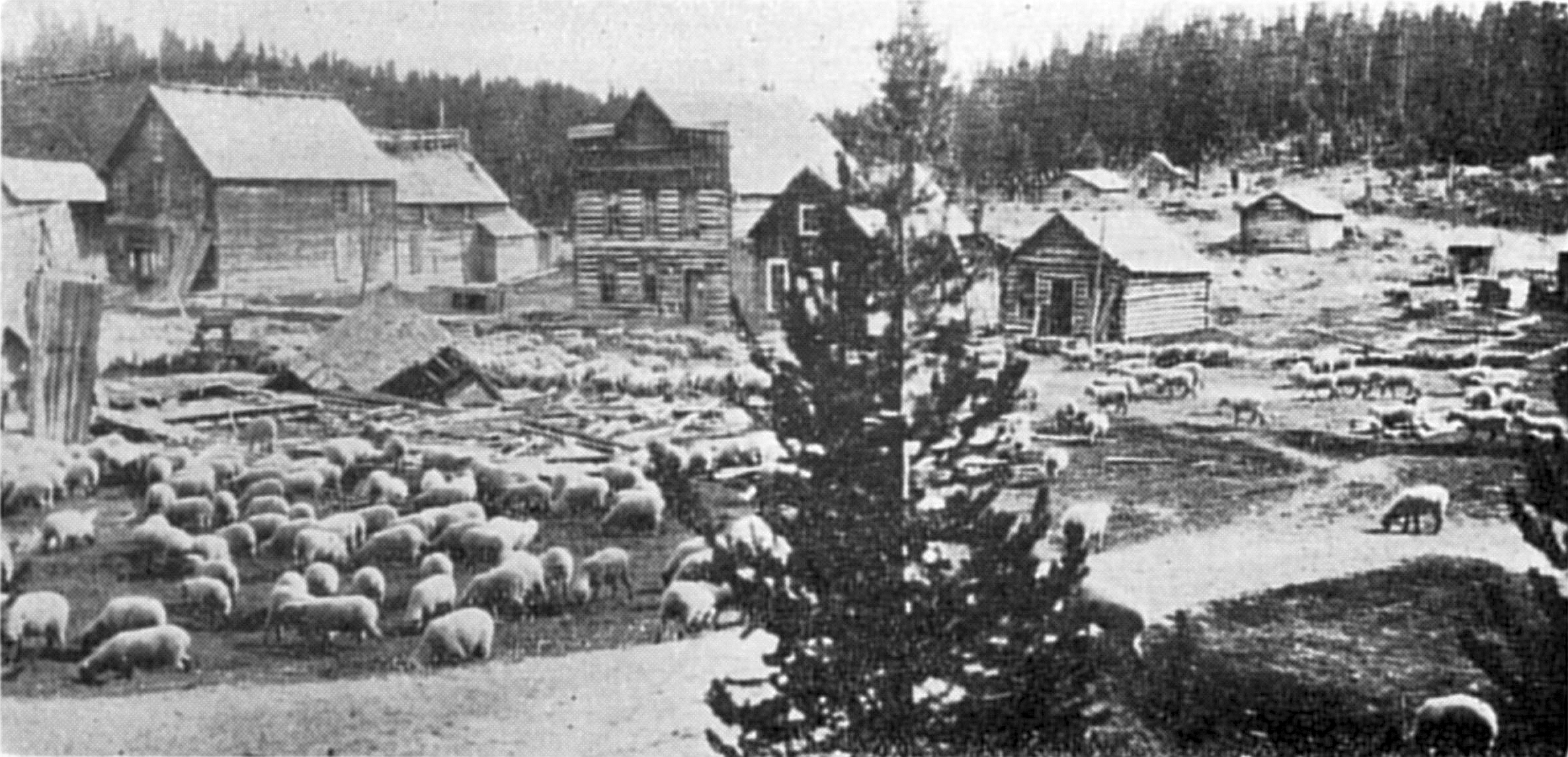
- Florence, 1900

- Location within Idaho Location within the United States
- Coordinates: 45°30′04″N 116°01′42″W
- Country: United States
- State: Idaho
- County: Idaho
- Elevation: 6,080 ft (1,850 m)
- Time zone: UTC-8 (Pacific (PST))
  - Summer (DST): UTC-7 (PDT)

Florence is a ghost town in Idaho County, Idaho, United States. About 14 air miles (22 km) east-northeast of present-day Riggins in remote north central Idaho at an elevation of 6,080 feet (1,850 m). It was settled as a mining camp in the winter of 1861. Almost concurrent with its settlement, Washington Territory established Idaho County on December 20, 1861, in anticipation of a gold rush that brought over 9,000 residents within the first year., The town quickly became the seat with the first district court taking place at Florence on 22 September 1862. While the rich placer gold fields in the Florence Basin brought thousands of prospectors and contributed to the establishment of Idaho Territory in 1863, the rush to Florence was short-lived as intensive mining depleted the richest ground. At the first census of Idaho Territory, only 575 residents remained. By the territorial census of 1864, the population dwindled further to 254 residents. Even in its decline, Florence continued as the county seat until 1 June 1869 when the territorial legislature moved the county seat to the Warren's Camp settlement of Washington. The town thrived again from 1895–1900, based more on lode mining. Then the town slowly faded away, having only ten inhabitants in 1940, and was totally abandoned sometime after 1951.

== Early discoveries and prosperity ==
The discovery of gold around Pierce and Orofino in 1861 drew thousands of prospectors into the Clearwater River area of present-day north central Idaho, east of Lewiston. With all the best ground claimed, many newcomers began to look elsewhere. In late summer 1861, a party of men headed south toward a local divide between the Clearwater River drainage and the Salmon River watershed. At that time, much of that area was still part of the Nez Perce Indian Reservation. (A new treaty in June 1863 reset the reservation boundary.) Perhaps because of Indian protests, the party split at some point. A smaller band of five made their way into a high mountain basin about thirty miles (48 km) south of today's Grangeville. There, they found very rich placer gold along most of the nearby streams in August 1861. Despite mutual promises to keep the find quiet when they returned to Elk City for supplies, word quickly got out.

The camp went briefly under the name of Millersburg, but a miners' meeting soon settled on Florence in November 1861. That was the name the town had when the Washington territorial legislature made it the seat of Idaho County on December 20, 1861. By the time winter took hold, the camp reportedly held nearly two thousand men. Unfortunately, the winter of 1861–1862 "proved to be one of the coldest in the history of Idaho." No one knows how many men died from the cold, but one newspaper writer had "no doubt that at least one hundred men have perished from the cold." Survivors told horrific stories of near-starvation, frostbite, and widespread snow-blindness.

As was common to many of those early placer mining districts, the richest days in Florence lasted only a couple years. About five years of steady, but lesser production followed. By around 1869, Chinese miners were working most of the claims in the region, whites having leased the properties or abandoned them. Probably not coincidentally, Florence lost its designation as county seat on June 1, 1869. The period of largely Chinese production lasted until about 1880, followed by a long stretch of minimal activity.

== Population history ==
Historical population
Census	Pop.	Note	%±
1870	154		—
1880	175		13.6%
1890	390		122.9%
1900	135		−65.4%
1910	52		−61.5%

- 1864 census: 254 (222 men, 11 women, 21 children)
- 1863 census: 575

== Resurgence and decline ==
The first quartz lodes in the Florence area might have been developed as early as 1863. Another followed around 1872–1875. However, the location of the Florence Basin in high, extremely rugged country made transportation especially difficult. Operators had to rely on hand mills, or very small stamp mills that could be broken down into manageable components for transport. In 1895, a new road was built to connect Florence to Mount Idaho. With better transport, investors took another look at the quartz mining possibilities in the region. They found enough rich ore to justify bringing in more milling capacity, which set off another boom. Optimistic owners even assembled a dredge to re-work the old placer fields.

Early returns seemed to justify their hopes, but both the lode and placer booms were fairly short-lived. By around 1900–1905, those hopes had faded and the town had to depend upon small-scale, essentially individual operations after that. Even that had ended by around 1940, when the census recorded just ten people in Florence.

In 1951, when Sister Alfreda Elsensohn published her history of Idaho County, the handful of Florence inhabitants no longer received local mail delivery. It's not clear when the last resident moved away (or passed on). Today, only a few building foundations and an overgrown cemetery remain.

The Florence Basin is several miles west of the Gospel Hump Wilderness, which was designated a wilderness area in 1978. The basin is over 4,000 vertical feet (1,220 m) above the Salmon River, five air miles (8 km) north of its confluence with French Creek. After flowing westward across the state, the river turns north at Riggins; Florence is also twelve miles (19 km) east of the river as it nears Lucile (elev. 1,650 ft (500 m)).
