= Stites, Idaho =

- City
- Location of Stites in Idaho County, Idaho.
- Coordinates: 46°05′32″N 115°58′34″W
- Country: United States
- State: Idaho
- County: Idaho

Area
  - Total: 0.10 sq mi (0.26 km^{2})
  - Land: 0.093 sq mi (0.24 km^{2})
  - Water: 0.0077 sq mi (0.02 km^{2})
- Elevation: 1,316 ft (401 m)

Population (2020)
  - Total: 171
  - Density: 1,800/sq mi (710/km^{2})
- Time zone: UTC-8 (Pacific (PST))
  - Summer (DST): UTC-7 (PDT)
- ZIP code: 83552
- Area code: 208
- FIPS code: 16-77500
- GNIS feature ID: 2411985

Stites is a city in Idaho County, Idaho, United States. In the lower canyon of the South Fork of the Clearwater River, it is about four miles (6 km) upstream and south of Kooskia on State Highway 13. The population was 171 at the 2020 census, down from 221 in 2010.

== History ==
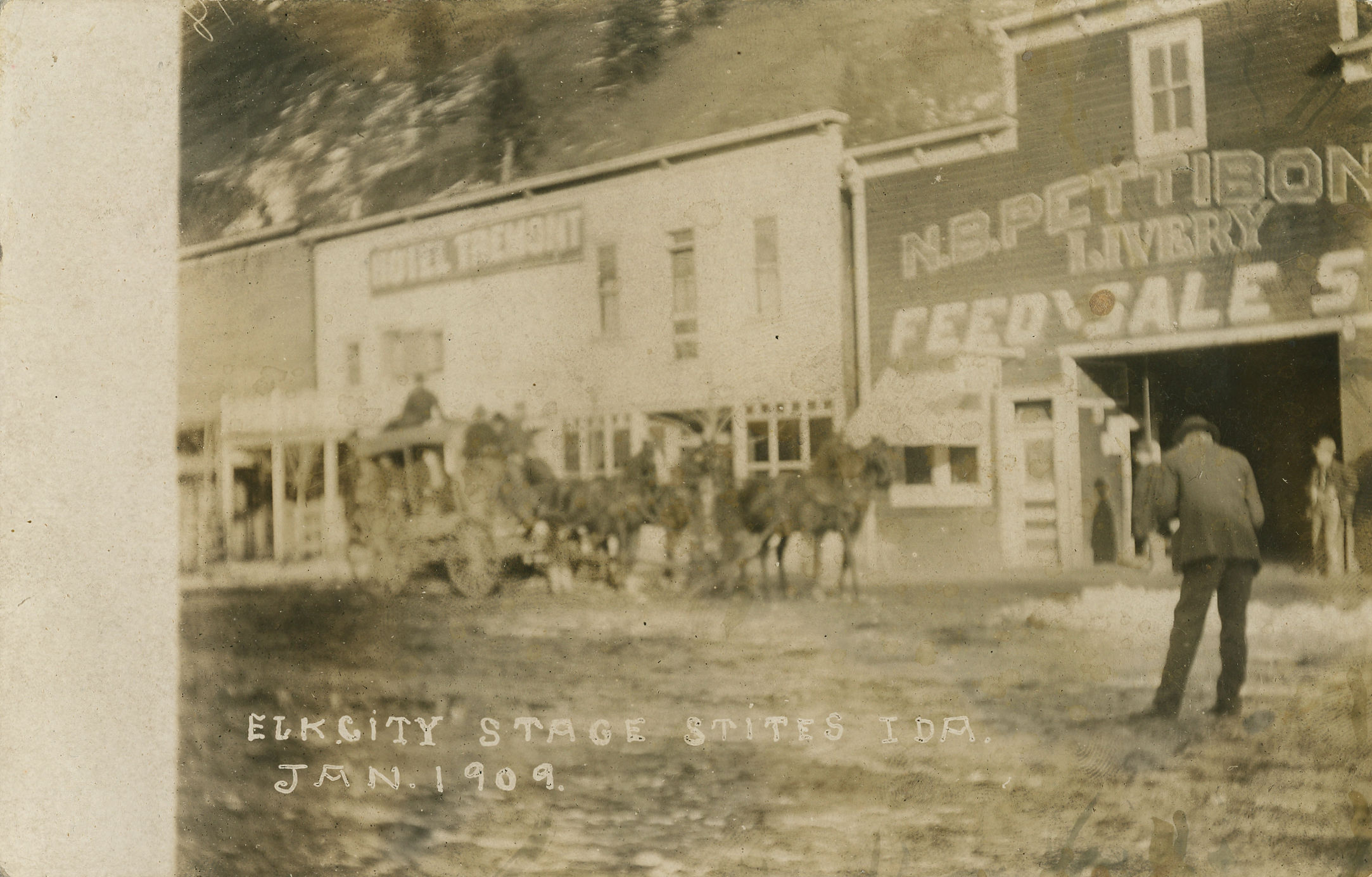
Stage coach in Stites, Jan. 1909

Stites was named for Jacob Stites of New Jersey, who homesteaded the land in 1897 which became the city. He sold two years later and exercised his option to name it. Stites became the eastern terminus of the Northern Pacific branch line up the Clearwater in 1900, later the Camas Prairie Railroad's first subdivision line. It climbed the main river eastward from Lewiston to Kooskia and then turned south to ascend the lower South Fork. The abandoned spur was removed in the 1980s, and the city incorporated in early 1905.

The original highway bridge (1911) that crossed the Salmon River just north of Riggins was replaced in 1936 and moved fifty miles (80 km) north to Stites.

== Geography ==
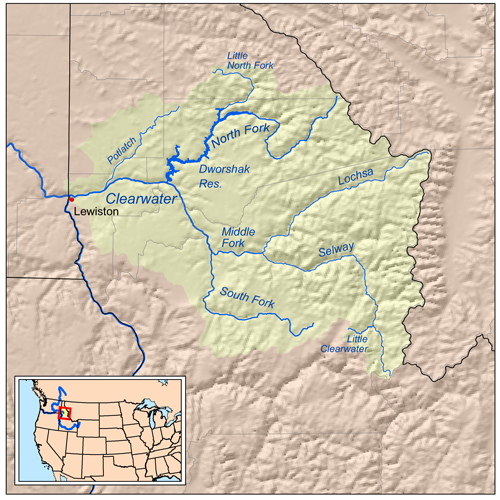
Clearwater River drainage in north central Idaho

According to the United States Census Bureau, the city has a total area of 0.10 square miles (0.26 km^{2}), of which, 0.09 square miles (0.23 km^{2}) is land and 0.01 square miles (0.03 km^{2}) is water.

== Demographics ==
Historical population
Census	Pop.	Note	%±
1910	300		—
1920	317		5.7%
1930	278		−12.3%
1940	258		−7.2%
1950	227		−12.0%
1960	299		31.7%
1970	263		−12.0%
1980	253		−3.8%
1990	204		−19.4%
2000	226		10.8%
2010	221		−2.2%
2020	171		−22.6%
U.S. Decennial Census

=== 2010 census ===
As of the census of 2010, there were 221 people, 103 households, and 57 families residing in the city. The population density was 2,455.6 inhabitants per square mile (948.1/km^{2}). There were 116 housing units at an average density of 1,288.9 per square mile (497.6/km^{2}). The racial makeup of the city was 95.0% White, 1.4% African American, 1.8% Native American, and 1.8% from two or more races. Hispanic or Latino of any race were 3.2% of the population.

There were 103 households, of which 22.3% had children under the age of 18 living with them, 44.7% were married couples living together, 7.8% had a female householder with no husband present, 2.9% had a male householder with no wife present, and 44.7% were non-families. 34.0% of all households were made up of individuals, and 16.5% had someone living alone who was 65 years of age or older. The average household size was 2.15 and the average family size was 2.79.

The median age in the city was 47.1 years. 20.4% of residents were under the age of 18; 8.5% were between the ages of 18 and 24; 19.5% were from 25 to 44; 32.5% were from 45 to 64; and 19% were 65 years of age or older. The gender makeup of the city was 48.0% male and 52.0% female.

=== 2000 census ===
As of the census of 2000, there were 226 people, 101 households, and 58 families residing in the city. The population density was 2,183.3 inhabitants per square mile (843.0/km^{2}). There were 110 housing units at an average density of 1,062.7 per square mile (410.3/km^{2}). The racial makeup of the city was 95.58% White, 2.21% Native American, 0.44% Asian, and 1.77% from two or more races. Hispanic or Latino of any race were 1.33% of the population.

There were 101 households, out of which 24.8% had children under the age of 18 living with them, 44.6% were married couples living together, 9.9% had a female householder with no husband present, and 41.6% were non-families. 34.7% of all households were made up of individuals, and 18.8% had someone living alone who was 65 years of age or older. The average household size was 2.24 and the average family size was 2.88.

In the city, the population was spread out, with 22.1% under the age of 18, 11.9% from 18 to 24, 21.2% from 25 to 44, 27.4% from 45 to 64, and 17.3% who were 65 years of age or older. The median age was 42 years. For every 100 females, there were 98.2 males. For every 100 females age 18 and over, there were 100.0 males.

The median income for a household in the city was $22,386, and the median income for a family was $30,000. Males had a median income of $35,625 versus $13,750 for females. The per capita income for the city was $10,933. About 16.2% of families and 17.8% of the population were below the poverty line, including 9.6% of those under the age of eighteen and 23.7% of those 65 or over.
