= Idaho County, Idaho =

County in Idaho, United States

- County
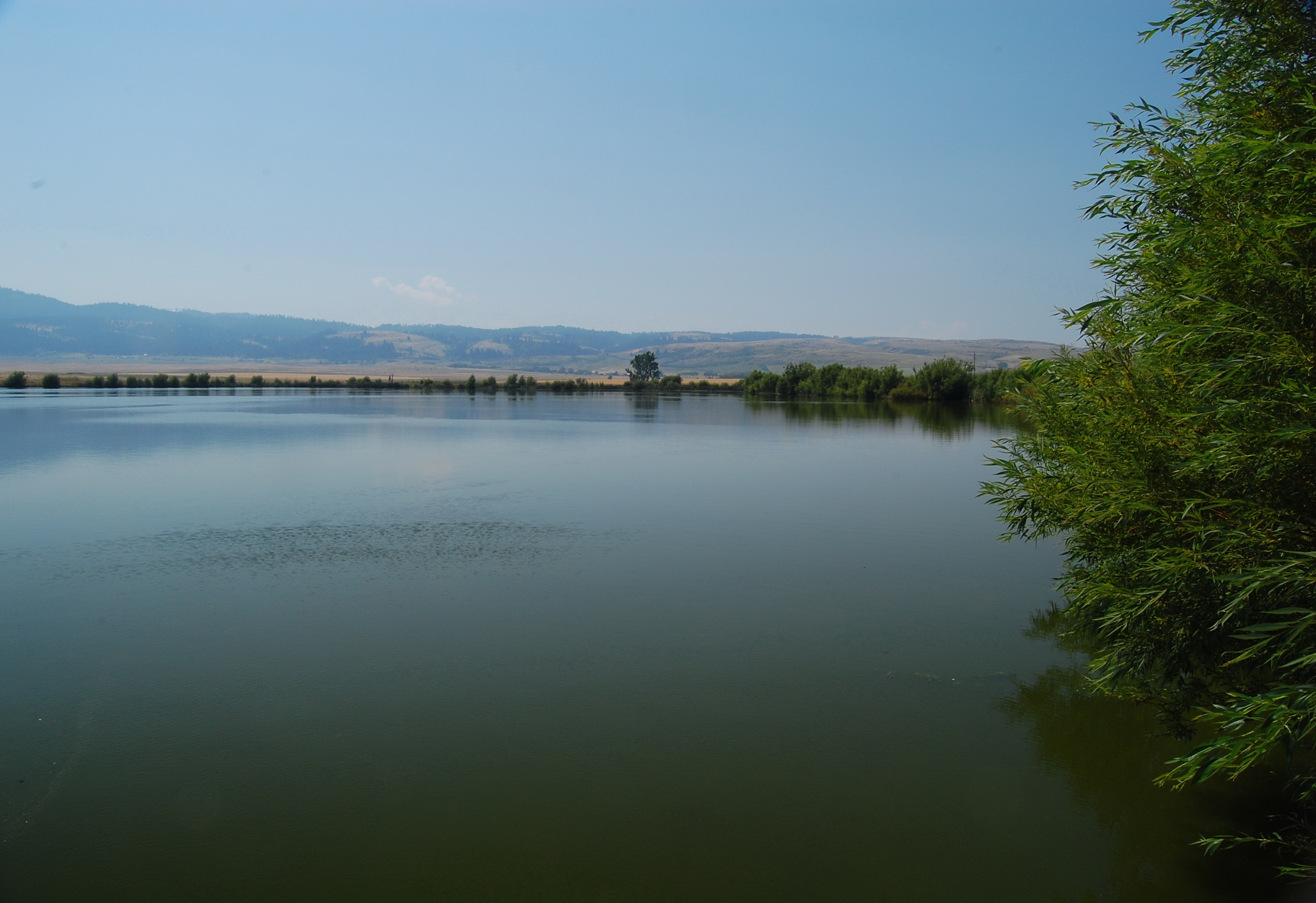
- Tolo Lake

- Seal

- Location within the U.S. state of Idaho
- Coordinates: 45°51′N 115°28′W
- Country: United States
- State: Idaho
- Founded: December 20, 1861
- Named for: Idaho
- Seat: Grangeville
- Largest city: Grangeville

Area
  - Total: 8,503 sq mi (22,020 km^{2})
  - Land: 8,477 sq mi (21,960 km^{2})
  - Water: 26 sq mi (67 km^{2}) 0.3%

Population (2020)
  - Total: 16,541
  - Estimate (2025): 17,874 ▲
  - Density: 1.951/sq mi (0.7534/km^{2})

Time zones
- North of Salmon River: UTC−8 (Pacific)
  - Summer (DST): UTC−7 (PDT)
- South of Salmon River: UTC−7 (Mountain)
  - Summer (DST): UTC−6 (MDT)
- Congressional district: 1st
- Website: idahocounty.org

Idaho County is a county in the U.S. state of Idaho, and the largest by area in the state. As of the 2020 census, the population was 16,541. The county seat is Grangeville. Previous county seats of the area were Florence (1864–68), Washington (1868–75), and Mount Idaho (1875–1902). Despite the name, Idaho City is in Boise County further south.

== History ==
Discovery of gold occurred in succession at Elk City, Newsome, and Florence during the spring and summer of 1861. At the time, all of the settlements were within Shoshone County, Washington Territory. Thousands flocked to Florence. As a result, Idaho County was founded 165 years ago as a region of Washington Territory on December 20, 1861, named for a steamer called Idaho that was launched on the Columbia River in 1860. It was reorganized by the Idaho Territorial Legislature on February 4, 1864. In this context, the Idaho Territory and the State of Idaho are both preceded by the county name.

Settlements at Cottonwood, Mount Idaho, and Warrens were established in 1862. The Warrens settlement was a fractured settlement as a result of settlement there by both Union and Confederate affiliated miners. The Union affiliated miners on the northern edge of the settlement named their portion of the settlement Washington while the Confederate affiliated miners named their portion Richmond. Richmond dwindled by 1866 and Washington went on to become the county seat in 1868 and was the name of the settlement used in most government documents during the period of settlement. Out of all these settlements, only Cottonwood went on to eventually become one of Idaho County's seven incorporated cities.

Idaho Territory conducted a census in 1863 and another in 1864. Population data was returned for both years for Warrens (660/521), Florence (575/254), Elk City (372/219), Slate Creek (216/117), Clearwater Station (212/76), and Newsome (62/24). For 1864, data was also returned for the settlements of Mount Idaho (74), Miller's Camp (36), and Cottonwood (17). Between 1863 and 1864, Idaho County saw a decrease from 1,601 residents to 955.

Settlement at White Bird occurred some time prior to 1870 as a precinct under the same name is listed with 71 inhabitants at the 1870 census. Efforts to force White Bird's band of Nez Perce tribesmen to the Nez Perce Reservation led to the Battle of White Bird Canyon in 1877. The town was established in 1891.

Grangeville emerged as a town at the 1880 census with 129 residents. It was incorporated as a city in 1904. Ferdinand and Kooskia were settled starting in 1895 and along with Cottonwood and Stites, were all incorporated prior to 1920. Development of Riggins started prior to 1930 with Riggins Village being incorporated in 1948.

Idaho County's boundaries have changed more times than any other Idaho's county with changes occurring on 20 separate dates over the county's first 57 years. The majority of those changes were from boundary realignment with only three counties taking territory from Idaho County at their creation. Originating at 75,789 square miles, its original boundary under Washington Territory contained the southern portion of Idaho County, Idaho's 34 southern counties, part of Ravalli County, Montana, and parts of Fremont, Lincoln, Park, Sublette, and Teton counties in Wyoming. Boise was partitioned off in January 1863 with the Payette River being the primary dividing line. In 1864, two separate acts transferred the portion in Montana to Missoula County, established the southern boundary at 44° 30' latitude, and made slight adjustments in the northern boundary to define the county as one of Idaho Territory's seven original counties. Three boundary adjustments were made with Nez Perce and Ada between 1866 and 1867 and Lemhi was created in 1869 from territory east of the junction of the Middle Fork and main Salmon Rivers. In 1873, the southern border was moved north to the divide between the main Salmon River with the Payette River and Middle Fork of Salmon River, bringing the county to its smallest historical land area of 2,901 square miles. The boundary adjustment of 1875 created a county very similar to present Idaho County containing an area of 8,165 square miles. Between 1879 and 1885, one change added territory on the Camas Prairie from Nez Perce while another brought back territory in present-day Adams, Valley, Custer, and Lemhi counties in the south. In 1887, territory was exchanged with Boise County dividing present Valley County between the two counties. One change in 1889 transferred territory to Custer County while another change finalized the county's northern border at its present location. The southern border began to take shape after two changes in 1891 and 1895 exchanged territory between Washington and Idaho counties. Adjustments with Lemhi in 1903 and 1911 and the creation of Valley County in 1918 brought the county to its present boundary.

Idaho County is one of seven counties in the United States that has the same name as the state in which it lies. The other six are Arkansas, Hawaii, Iowa, New York, Oklahoma, and Utah.

== Geography ==
According to the U.S. Census Bureau, the county has a total area of 8,503 square miles (22,020 km^{2}), of which 8,477 square miles (21,960 km^{2}) is land and 26 square miles (67 km^{2}) (0.3%) is water. It is the largest county by area in Idaho. The southeast portion of the Nez Perce Indian Reservation is in the county's northwest corner. Due to the county's size, it is the only county that touches Oregon and Montana.

=== Adjacent counties ===
- Clearwater County – north
- Missoula County, Montana – northeast
- Ravalli County, Montana – east
- Lemhi County – southeast
- Valley County – south
- Adams County – southwest
- Wallowa County, Oregon – west
- Nez Perce County – northwest
- Lewis County – northwest

=== National protected areas ===
- Bitterroot National Forest – (part)
- Clearwater National Forest – (part)
- Frank Church-River of No Return Wilderness – (part)
- Gospel Hump Wilderness
- Hells Canyon National Recreation Area – (part)
- Hells Canyon Wilderness – (part)
- Nez Perce National Forest
- Nez Perce National Historical Park – (part)
- Payette National Forest – (part)
- Salmon-Challis National Forest – (part)
- Selway-Bitterroot Wilderness – (part)
- Wallowa–Whitman National Forest – (part)

There are 4,431,720 acres (17,934.5 km^{2}; 6,924.56 mi^{2}) of National Forest land within the county, more than in any county (or borough) outside of Alaska. National Forests and their acreage within the county are: Nez Perce National Forest 2,224,091; Clearwater National Forest 870,807; Payette National Forest 804,853; Bitterroot National Forest 464,108; Salmon National Forest 66,074; and Wallowa National Forest 1,787. The Nez Perce National Forest is located entirely within the county's borders, and is the largest National Forest lying within a single county.

=== Time zones ===
Idaho County is one of the few counties in the United States with two time zones, divided by the Salmon River. Most of the county is in the Pacific Time Zone, but those areas south of the Salmon River are in the Mountain Time Zone.

== Transportation ==
=== Major highways ===
- – US 12
- – US 95

- SH-13
- SH-14

- SH-62
- SH-64

=== Airports ===
- Chamberlain USFS Airport (U79) – Chamberlain Guard Station
- Cold Meadows USFS Airport (U81) – Cold Meadows Guard Station
- Cottonwood Municipal Airport (S84) – Cottonwood
- Dixie USFS Airport (A05) – Dixie
- Wilson Bar USFS Airport (C48) – Dixie
- Elk City Airport (S90) – Elk City
- Fish Lake USFS Airport (S92) – Fish Lake
- Idaho County Airport (S80) – Grangeville
- Kamiah Municipal Airport (S73) – Kamiah
- Kooskia Municipal Airport (S82) – Kooskia
- Moose Creek USFS Airport (1U1) – Moose Creek Ranger Station
- Orogrande Airport (USFS) (75C) – Orogrande
- Shearer USFS Airport (2U5) – Shearer
- Slate Creek Airport (1S7) – Slate Creek
- Warren USFS Airport (3U1) – Warren

== Demographics ==
Historical population
Census	Pop.	Note	%±
1870	849		—
1880	2,031		139.2%
1890	2,955		45.5%
1900	9,121		208.7%
1910	12,384		35.8%
1920	11,759		−5.0%
1930	10,107		−14.0%
1940	12,691		25.6%
1950	11,423		−10.0%
1960	13,542		18.6%
1970	12,891		−4.8%
1980	14,769		14.6%
1990	13,783		−6.7%
2000	15,511		12.5%
2010	16,267		4.9%
2020	16,541		1.7%
2025 (est.)	17,874	▲	8.1%
U.S. Decennial Census; 1790–1960 1900–1990; 1990–2000 2010–2020

=== Racial and ethnic composition ===
Idaho County, Idaho – Racial and ethnic composition Note: the US Census treats Hispanic/Latino as an ethnic category. This table excludes Latinos from the racial categories and assigns them to a separate category. Hispanics/Latinos may be of any race.
Race / Ethnicity (NH = Non-Hispanic)	Pop 1980	Pop 1990	Pop 2000	Pop 2010	Pop 2020	% 1980	% 1990	% 2000	% 2010	% 2020
White alone (NH)	14,439	13,286	14,491	15,028	14,656	97.77%	96.39%	93.42%	92.38%	88.60%
Black or African American alone (NH)	9	3	12	38	54	0.06%	0.02%	0.08%	0.23%	0.33%
Native American or Alaska Native alone (NH)	200	336	443	446	414	1.35%	2.44%	2.86%	2.74%	2.50%
Asian alone (NH)	20	33	38	65	55	0.14%	0.24%	0.24%	0.40%	0.33%
Native Hawaiian or Pacific Islander alone (NH)	x	x	3	6	5	x	x	0.02%	0.04%	0.03%
Other race alone (NH)	6	1	40	9	94	0.04%	0.01%	0.26%	0.06%	0.57%
Mixed race or Multiracial (NH)	x	x	241	254	652	x	x	1.55%	1.56%	3.94%
Hispanic or Latino (any race)	95	124	243	421	611	0.64%	0.90%	1.57%	2.59%	3.69%
Total	14,769	13,783	15,511	16,267	16,541	100.00%	100.00%	100.00%	100.00%	100.00%

=== 2020 census ===
As of the 2020 census, the county had a population of 16,541. The median age was 51.4 years. 19.8% of residents were under the age of 18 and 29.4% of residents were 65 years of age or older. For every 100 females there were 110.2 males, and for every 100 females age 18 and over there were 110.4 males age 18 and over.

The racial makeup of the county was 89.6% White, 0.4% Black or African American, 2.7% American Indian and Alaska Native, 0.4% Asian, 0.0% Native Hawaiian and Pacific Islander, 1.5% from some other race, and 5.5% from two or more races. Hispanic or Latino residents of any race comprised 3.7% of the population.

0.0% of residents lived in urban areas, while 100.0% lived in rural areas.

There were 7,006 households in the county, of which 22.4% had children under the age of 18 living with them and 20.3% had a female householder with no spouse or partner present. About 30.2% of all households were made up of individuals and 17.5% had someone living alone who was 65 years of age or older.

There were 8,872 housing units, of which 21.0% were vacant. Among occupied housing units, 77.9% were owner-occupied and 22.1% were renter-occupied. The homeowner vacancy rate was 1.3% and the rental vacancy rate was 6.0%.

=== 2010 census ===
As of the 2010 United States census, there were 16,267 people, 6,834 households, and 4,536 families living in the county. The population density was 1.9 inhabitants per square mile (0.73/km^{2}). There were 8,744 housing units at an average density of 1.0 per square mile (0.39/km^{2}). The racial makeup of the county was 93.8% white, 3.0% American Indian, 0.4% Asian, 0.3% black or African American, 0.6% from other races, and 1.9% from two or more races. Those of Hispanic or Latino origin made up 2.6% of the population. In terms of ancestry, 39.8% were German, 16.6% were Irish, 15.0% were English, and 3.0% were American.

Of the 6,834 households, 24.4% had children under the age of 18 living with them, 55.7% were married couples living together, 6.6% had a female householder with no husband present, 33.6% were non-families, and 28.6% of all households were made up of individuals. The average household size was 2.30 and the average family size was 2.81. The median age was 48.0 years.

The median income for a household in the county was $34,536 and the median income for a family was $39,263. Males had a median income of $36,885 versus $25,982 for females. The per capita income for the county was $18,980. About 12.7% of families and 19.1% of the population were below the poverty line, including 28.7% of those under age 18 and 10.4% of those age 65 or over.

=== 2000 census ===
As of the census of 2000, there were 15,511 people, 6,084 households, and 4,295 families living in the county. The population density was 2 people per square mile (0.77 people/km^{2}). There were 7,537 housing units at an average density of 1 per square mile (0.39/km^{2}). The racial makeup of the county was 94.12% White, 0.08% Black or African American, 2.89% Native American, 0.26% Asian, 0.02% Pacific Islander, 0.91% from other races, and 1.72% from two or more races. 1.57% of the population were Hispanic or Latino of any race. 29.7% were of German, 12.9% American, 11.7% English and 9.0% Irish ancestry.

There were 6,084 households, out of which 29.20% had children under the age of 18 living with them, 60.80% were married couples living together, 6.30% had a female householder with no husband present, and 29.40% were non-families. 25.30% of all households were made up of individuals, and 11.70% had someone living alone who was 65 years of age or older. The average household size was 2.46 and the average family size was 2.95.

In the county, the population was spread out, with 25.00% under the age of 18, 6.30% from 18 to 24, 23.30% from 25 to 44, 28.40% from 45 to 64, and 17.00% who were 65 years of age or older. The median age was 42 years. For every 100 females there were 103.60 males. For every 100 females age 18 and over, there were 104.90 males.

The median income for a household in the county was $29,515, and the median income for a family was $33,919. Males had a median income of $28,383 versus $18,214 for females. The per capita income for the county was $14,411. About 12.50% of families and 16.30% of the population were below the poverty line, including 21.00% of those under age 18 and 10.00% of those age 65 or over.

== Communities ==
=== Cities ===
- Cottonwood
- Ferdinand
- Grangeville (County seat)
- Kooskia
- Riggins
- Stites
- White Bird

=== Census-designated place ===
- Elk City

=== Unincorporated communities ===
- Burgdorf
- Clearwater
- Dixie
- Fenn
- Golden
- Greencreek
- Harpster
- Lowell
- Lucile
- Orogrande
- Pollock
- Syringa
- Warren

=== Ghost towns ===
- Mount Idaho
- Florence

== Politics ==
United States presidential election results for Idaho County, Idaho
Year	Republican		Democratic		Third party(ies)	
Year	No.	%	No.	%	No.	%
1892	386	46.01%	0	0.00%	453	53.99%
1896	377	24.95%	1,127	74.59%	7	0.46%
1900	1,527	44.77%	1,884	55.23%	0	0.00%
1904	2,731	61.12%	1,381	30.91%	356	7.97%
1908	2,126	47.80%	1,833	41.21%	489	10.99%
1912	989	23.09%	1,679	39.19%	1,616	37.72%
1916	1,892	41.56%	2,265	49.76%	395	8.68%
1920	2,386	67.90%	1,128	32.10%	0	0.00%
1924	1,363	38.17%	779	21.81%	1,429	40.02%
1928	2,099	55.06%	1,676	43.97%	37	0.97%
1932	1,079	25.78%	3,005	71.79%	102	2.44%
1936	1,535	31.14%	3,104	62.97%	290	5.88%
1940	2,641	47.63%	2,888	52.08%	16	0.29%
1944	1,977	48.66%	2,071	50.97%	15	0.37%
1948	1,790	42.44%	2,300	54.53%	128	3.03%
1952	3,054	57.30%	2,269	42.57%	7	0.13%
1956	2,703	51.50%	2,546	48.50%	0	0.00%
1960	2,248	40.84%	3,256	59.16%	0	0.00%
1964	1,990	38.43%	3,188	61.57%	0	0.00%
1968	2,317	47.15%	1,883	38.32%	714	14.53%
1972	3,235	62.20%	1,622	31.19%	344	6.61%
1976	3,185	55.96%	2,323	40.81%	184	3.23%
1980	4,425	62.56%	2,078	29.38%	570	8.06%
1984	4,219	66.45%	1,996	31.44%	134	2.11%
1988	3,541	60.31%	2,198	37.44%	132	2.25%
1992	2,709	40.23%	1,974	29.31%	2,051	30.46%
1996	3,871	54.54%	1,979	27.88%	1,248	17.58%
2000	5,806	77.91%	1,187	15.93%	459	6.16%
2004	6,017	75.50%	1,689	21.19%	264	3.31%
2008	5,895	71.79%	2,017	24.56%	300	3.65%
2012	5,921	75.52%	1,708	21.79%	211	2.69%
2016	6,441	78.23%	1,196	14.53%	596	7.24%
2020	7,826	81.44%	1,561	16.24%	223	2.32%
2024	8,148	82.58%	1,460	14.80%	259	2.62%

Idaho County has consistently supported the Republican candidate in national elections. A Democratic candidate has not carried the county since 1964, when Lyndon B. Johnson won in a national landslide. Since then, the last Democratic candidate to crack 40% of the county's vote was Jimmy Carter in 1976. After 1976, the county has voted reliably Republican, with the Republican candidate receiving over 70% of the county's vote since 2000.

== See also ==
- National Register of Historic Places listings in Idaho County, Idaho
