= List of fire lookout towers =

List of forest fire lookout towers

Fire lookout towers and stations, including complexes of associated buildings and structures, watch for fire. Lookout cabins without towers are perched high and do not require further elevation to serve similar purposes, as are lookout trees. Some lookouts are used to record weather conditions and observe animals in addition to their main use.

== Australia ==
Fire stations with lookout towers

- Ballarat East Fire Station
- Ballarat Fire Station

and a number of other fire stations in Australia

Towers alone

- Stringers Knob Fire Spotting Tower
- Jimna Fire Tower
- Mount Dale
- Mount Gunjin, Western Australia
- Mount Lofty Fire Tower
- Waaje Fire Tower No.4

Fire lookout trees

- Dave Evans Bicentennial Tree
- Gloucester Tree

== Canada ==
- Botanie Mountain

== Romania ==
- Foișorul de Foc

== United Kingdom ==
- National Emergency Services Museum, Sheffield, England

== United States ==
The National Historic Lookout Register lists most historic, surviving fire towers in the United States. Many of these are listed on the National Register of Historic Places and the Forest Fire Lookout Association.

Formerly, more than 10,000 fire lookout persons staffed more than 5,000 of fire lookout towers or fire lookout stations in the United States alone. There have since been far fewer of both. A number of fire lookout trees also exist. The state of Wisconsin decided to close its last 72 operating fire lookout towers in 2016. Despite newer methods like aerial surveillance and cell phones, the state of Pennsylvania returned its use of fire lookout towers in 2017.

=== Arizona ===
- Atascosa Lookout House, Tubac, AZ, NRHP-listed
- Barfoot Lookout Complex, Portal, AZ, NRHP-listed
- Bear Mountain Lookout Complex, Mogollon Rim, AZ, NRHP-listed
- Big Springs Lookout Tower, Big Springs, AZ, NRHP-listed
- Buck Mountain Lookout Tower, Buck Mountain, AZ, NRHP-listed
- Deer Springs Lookout Complex, Mogollon Rim, AZ, NRHP-listed
- Diamond Point Lookout, Tonto Village, AZ
- Dry Park Lookout Cabin and Storage Sheds, Big Springs, AZ, NRHP-listed
- Grandview Lookout Tower and Cabin, Twin Lakes, AZ, NRHP-listed
- Hyde Mountain Lookout House, Camp Wood, AZ, NRHP-listed
- Jacob Lake Lookout Tower, Jacob Lake, AZ, NRHP-listed
- Kendrick Lookout Tower and Cabin, Pumpkin Center, AZ, NRHP-listed
- Lake Mountain Lookout Complex, McNary, AZ, NRHP-listed
- Lee Butte Lookout Tower and Cabin, Happy Jack, AZ, NRHP-listed
- Lemmon Rock Lookout House, Tucson, AZ, NRHP-listed
- Mingus Lookout Complex, Mingus, AZ, NRHP-listed
- Monte Vista Lookout Cabin, Elfrida, AZ, NRHP-listed
- Moqui Lookout Cabin, Blue Ridge, AZ, NRHP-listed
- Mormon Lake Lookout Cabin, Mormon Lake, AZ, NRHP-listed
- Promontory Butte Lookout Complex, Beaver Park, AZ, NRHP-listed
- PS Knoll Lookout Complex, Maverick, AZ, NRHP-listed
- Silver Peak Lookout Complex, Portal, AZ, NRHP-listed
- Volunteer Lookout Cabin, Bellemont, AZ, NRHP-listed
- West Peak Lookout Tower, Bonita, AZ, NRHP-listed
- Woody Mountain Lookout Tower, Flagstaff, AZ, NRHP-listed

Lookout trees

- Lookout trees in Kaibab National Forest
  - Cooper Ridge Lookout Tree, Fredonia, AZ, NRHP-listed
  - Corral Lake Lookout Tree, Fredonia, AZ, NRHP-listed
  - Fracas Lookout Tree, Fredonia, AZ, NRHP-listed
  - Grandview Lookout Tree, Grand Canyon, AZ, NRHP-listed
  - Hull Tank Lookout Tree, Grand Canyon, AZ, NRHP-listed
  - Little Mountain Lookout Tree, Fredonia, AZ, NRHP-listed
  - Summit Mountain Lookout Tree, Williams, AZ, NRHP-listed
  - Tater Point Lookout Tree, Fredonia, AZ, NRHP-listed
  - Telephone Hill Lookout Tree, Fredonia, AZ, NRHP-listed
  - Tipover Lookout Tree, Fredonia, AZ, NRHP-listed
  - Tusayan Lookout Tree, Tusayan, AZ, NRHP-listed

=== Arkansas ===
- Look See Tree
- Crossroads Fire Tower, Hamburg, AR, NRHP-listed
- Sugarloaf Fire Tower Historic District, Calico Rock, AR, NRHP-listed
- Tall Peak Fire Tower, Athens, AR, NRHP-listed
- Fort Lookout, Camden, AR, NRHP-listed

=== California ===
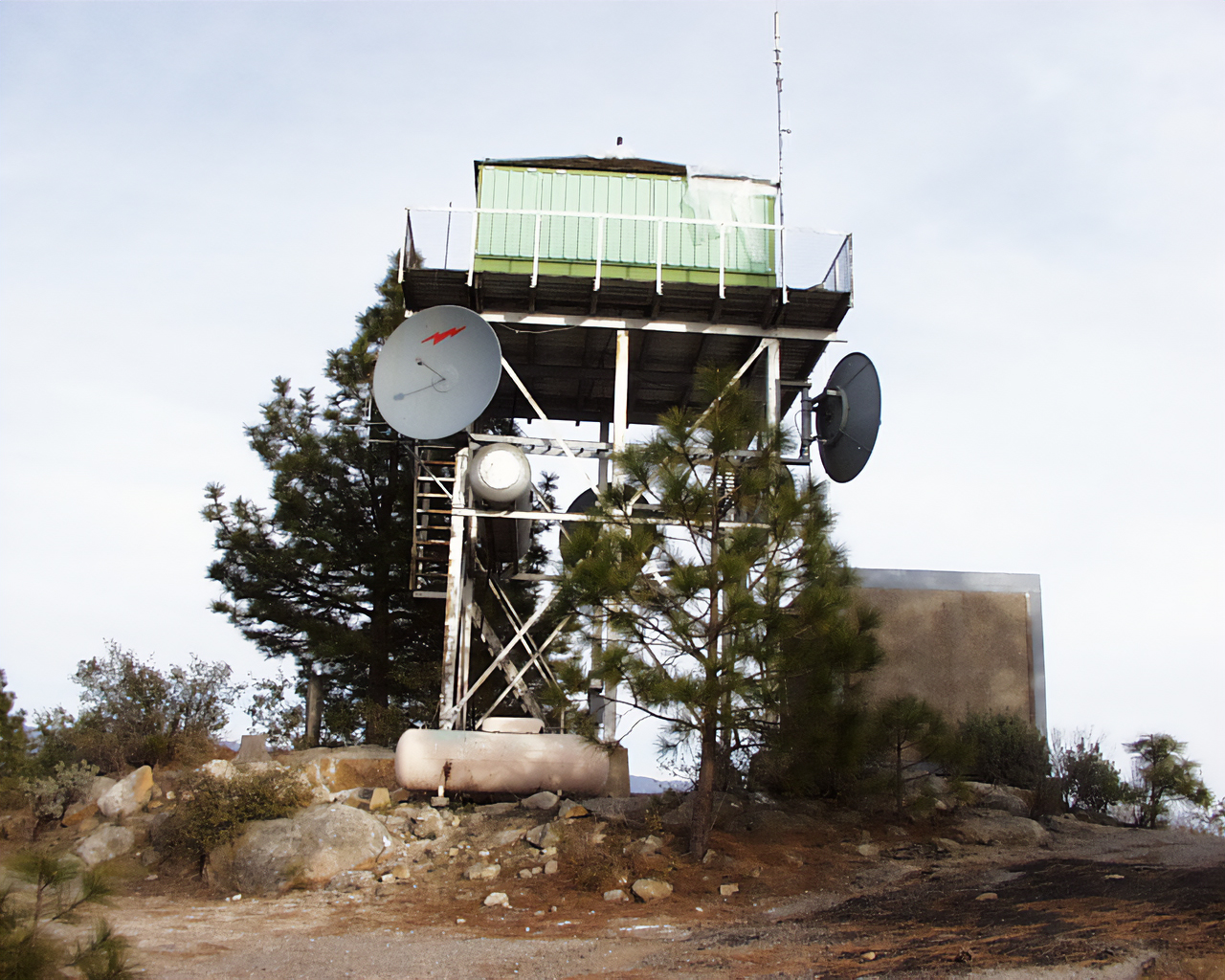
Goat Mountain Lookout, Bass Lake, California

Some are related to the Angeles National Forest Fire Lookout Association. California had a total of 625 fire lookout sites; of these, there are 198 remaining lookout towers, and of those, around 50 are staffed. There are 11 lookouts that may be rented in California. Lookouts not only watch for fire, they may also record weather conditions and observe animals.

- Alder Ridge Lookout (Eldorado National Forest)
- Allen Lookout
- American Camp Lookout (Stanislaus National Forest)
- Angora Ridge Lookout
- Annette Lookout
- Antelope Mountain Lookout (Lassen National Forest)
- Anthony Peak Lookout (Mendocino National Forest)
- Argentine Rock Lookout (Plumas National Forest)
- Armstrong Hill Lookout (Eldorado National Forest)
- Babbit Peak Lookout (Tahoe National Forest)
- Baker Point Lookout (Sequoia National Forest)
- Black Butte (Siskiyou County, California)
- Bald Mountain
- Bald Mountain (Eldorado National Forest)
- Bald Mountain (Inyo National Forest)
- Bald Mountain (Sequoia National Forest)
- Bald Mountain (Sierra National Forest)
- Baldy Mountain (Klamath National Forest)
- Ball Mountain Lookout (Klamath National Forest)
- Baltic Peak Lookout (Eldorado National Forest)
- Banner Mountain Lookout
- Basalt Hill Lookout
- Bear Mountain Lookout
- Bear Mountain Lookout
- Bear Mountain Lookout
- Big Hill Lookout (Eldorado National Forest)
- Big Hill Lookout
- Black Fox Mountain Lookout (Shasta-Trinity National Forest)
- Black Mountain Lookout
- Black Mountain Lookout (Plumas National Forest)
- Black Mountain Lookout (San Bernardino National Forest)
- Black Rock Lookout (Shasta-Trinity National Forest)
- Black Ridge Lookout (Lassen National Forest)
- Bloomer Hill Lookout (Plumas National Forest)
- Blue Mountain Lookout (Modoc National Forest)
- Blue Ridge Lookout (Klamath National Forest)
- Bolivar Lookout (Klamath National Forest)
- Bonanza King Lookout (Shasta-Trinity National Forest)
- Boucher Hill Lookout (Palomar Mountain State Park)
- Branch Mountain Lookout (Los Padres National Forest)
- Breckenridge Lookout (Sequoia National Forest)
- Brush Mountain Lookout (Six Rivers National Forest)
- Buck Rock Lookout (Sequoia National Forest)
- Buckhorn Bally Lookout (Klamath National Forest)
- Bully Choop Lookout
- Bunker Hill Lookout (Eldorado National Forest)
- Burney Mountain Lookout (Lassen National Forest)
- Butler Peak Lookout (San Bernardino National Forest)
- Cahto Peak Lookout (Mendocino National Forest)
- Calandra Lookout
- Call Mountain Lookout
- Castro Peak Lookout
- Chalone Peak Lookout (Pinnacles National Forest)
- Chews Ridge Lookout in the Los Padres National Forest in Monterey County, California, NRHP-listed
- Colby Mountain Lookout
- Cold Spring Lookout
- Collins Creek Baldy Lookout
- Cone Peak Lookout, in the Los Padres National Forest in Monterey County, California
- Copernicus Peak Lookout
- Cotton Pass Fire Station and Lookout
- Crane Flat Fire Lookout, Aspen Valley, CA, NRHP-listed
- Cuyama Peak Lookout
- Deadwood Peak Lookout
- Delilah Lookout
- Digger Butte Lookout
- Dixie Mountain Lookout
- Don Landon Lookout
- Dow Butte Lookout
- Duckwall Mountain Lookout
- Duncan Peak Lookout
- Duzel Rock Lookout
- Dyer Mountain Lookout
- Eagle Peak Lookout
- Eddy Gulch Lookout
- English Peak Lookout
- Estelle Mountain Lookout
- Fence Meadow Lookout
- Figueroa Mountain Lookout
- Fowler Peak Lookout
- Frazier Mountain Lookout
- Fredonyer Peak Lookout
- Gardner Lookout
- Goat Mountain Lookout
- Grasshopper Peak Lookout
- Green Mountain Lookout
- Grouse Ridge Lookout
- Happy Camp Lookout (Modoc National Forest)
- Harvey Mountain Lookout
- Hayden Hill Lookout
- Hayfork Bally Lookout
- Henness Ridge Fire Lookout (Yosemite National Park)
- Herd Peak Lookout
- Hi Mountain Lookout
- High Glade Lookout
- High Point Lookout
- Hogback Mountain Lookout
- Horse Ridge Lookout
- Hot Springs Mountain Lookout
- Howell Hill Lookout
- Margarita Lookout (Clevland National Forest)
- Morton Peak Fire Lookout (San Bernardino National Forest)
- Mount Harkness Fire Lookout, in Lassen Volcanic National Park near Mineral, California, NRHP-listed
- Prospect Peak Fire Lookout, in Lassen Volcanic National Park near Mineral, California, NRHP-listed
- Round Mountain Lookout (Modoc National Forest)
- Sid Ormsbee Lookout, in The Santa Lucia Preserve near Carmel, California
- Thompson Peak Lookout (Plumas County)
- Wolf Mountain Lookout

Lookout rentals

- Bear Basin Lookout (Six Rivers National Forest)
- Black Mountain Lookout (Plumas National Forest)
- Calpine Hill Lookout (Tahoe National Forest)
- Girard Ridge Fire Lookout (Shasta-Trinity National Forest)
- Hirz Mountain Lookout (Shasta-Trinity National Forest)
- Little Mount Hoffman (Shasta-Trinity National Forest)
- Mccarthy Point Lookout (Lassen National Forest)
- Oak Flat (Sequoia National Forest)
- Pine Mountain Lookout (Mendocino National Forest)
- Post Creek Lookout (Shasta-Trinity National Forest)
- Sardine Peak Lookout (Tahoe National Forest)

=== Colorado ===
- Devils Head Lookout, Sedalia, CO, NRHP-listed
- Fairview Peak Lookout (Colorado), Pitkin, CO
- Fremont Lookout Fortification Site, Rangely, CO, NRHP-listed
- Lookout Mountain Park, Golden, CO, NRHP-listed
- Shadow Mountain Lookout, Grand Lake, CO, NRHP-listed
- Twin Sisters Lookout, Estes Park, CO, NRHP-listed

=== Georgia ===
- Chenocetah Fire Tower, Cornelia, GA, NRHP-listed
- Lookout Mountain Fairyland Club, Lookout Mountain, GA, NRHP-listed

=== Idaho ===
- Butts Point Creek Fire Lookout
- Gardiner Peak Lookout
- Salmon Mountain Lookout
- Arctic Point Fire Lookout, Big Creek, ID, NRHP-listed
- Carey Dome Fire Lookout, Burgdorf, ID, NRHP-listed
- Mallard Peak Lookout, Avery, ID, NRHP-listed
- Bishop Mountain Lookout, Island Park, ID, NRHP-listed
- East Fork Lookout, Clayton, ID, NRHP-listed

=== Illinois ===
- Union Lookout, Jonesboro, IL, NRHP-listed
- Trigg Tower, Simpson, IL
- Big River State Forest, Keithsburg, IL

=== Indiana ===
- Hickory Ridge Fire Tower

=== Iowa ===
- Yellow River Fire Tower

=== Massachusetts ===
- Warwick Fire Tower
- Massaemett Mountain

=== Michigan ===
- Udell Lookout Tower, Wellston, MI, NRHP-listed

=== Mississippi ===
- Moore Lookout Tower, Forest, MS, NRHP-listed

=== Missouri ===
- Climax Springs Fire Tower
- Knob Lick Fire Tower
- Arrow Rock State Historic Site Lookout Shelter, Arrow Rock, MO, NRHP-listed
- Meramec State Park Lookout House/Observation Tower, Sullivan, MO, NRHP-listed

=== Montana ===
- Apgar Fire Lookout, West Glacier, MT, NRHP-listed
- Carey Dome Fire Lookout
- Clark's Lookout, August 13, 1805, Dillon, MT, NRHP-listed
- Heaven's Peak Fire Lookout, West Glacier, MT, NRHP-listed
- Hornet Lookout, Flathead National Forest, MT, NRHP-listed
- Huckleberry Fire Lookout, Glacier National Park, NRHP-listed
- Jumbo Fire Lookout, Hungry Horse, MT
- Loneman Fire Lookout, West Glacier, MT, NRHP-listed
- McCart Fire Lookout, Sula, MT, NRHP-listed
- Mount Brown Fire Lookout, West Glacier, MT, NRHP-listed
- Numa Ridge Fire Lookout, West Glacier, MT, NRHP-listed
- Scalplock Mountain Fire Lookout, West Glacier, MT, NRHP-listed
- Spotted Bear Fire Lookout, Hungry Horse, MT
- Swiftcurrent Fire Lookout, West Glacier, MT, NRHP-listed

=== New Hampshire ===
The number of towers has varied over time, and aerial monitoring is also used. The following locations have fire towers as of 2020:

- Belknap Mountain
- Blue Job Fire Tower, Farmington
- Cardigan Mountain
- Federal Hill, Milford
- Green Mountain, Effingham
- Kearsarge North, Pequawket Fire Tower
- Magalloway Mountain
- Milan Hill
- Pack Monadnock
- Oak Hill, Loudon
- Pawtuckaway State Park
- Pitcher Mountain
- Mount Prospect, Weeks State Park
- Red Hill
- Warner Hill

=== New Mexico ===
- Bearwallow Mountain Lookout Cabins and Shed, Bearwallow Park, NM, NRHP-listed
- Black Mountain Lookout Cabin, Black Mountain, NM, NRHP-listed
- Bluewater Lookout Complex, Weed, NM, NRHP-listed
- Carrisa Lookout Complex, Long Canyon, NM, NRHP-listed
- El Caso Lookout Complex, El Caso Lake, NM, NRHP-listed
- Glorieta Baldy Lookout Tower, La Cueva, NM, NRHP-listed
- Hillsboro Peak Lookout Tower and Cabin, Hillsboro, NM, NRHP-listed
- Mangas Mountain Lookout Complex, Mangas, NM, NRHP-listed
- Mogollon Baldy Lookout Cabin, Mogollon Baldy Peak, NM, NRHP-listed
- Monjeau Lookout, Villa Madonna, NM, NRHP-listed
- Reeds Peak Lookout Tower, Reeds Peak, NM, NRHP-listed
- Ruidoso Lookout Tower, Ruidoso, NM, NRHP-listed
- Weed Lookout Tower, Sacramento, NM, NRHP-listed
- Wofford Lookout Complex, Cloudcroft, NM, NRHP-listed

=== New York ===
A number of fire lookout tower stations, including many in New York State near the Adirondack Forest Preserve and Catskill Park, have been listed on the National Register of Historic Places. They include:

Adirondack Park

- Arab Mountain Fire Observation Station, Piercefield, NY, NRHP-listed
- Azure Mountain Fire Observation Station, Waverly, NY, NRHP-listed
- Blue Mountain Fire Observation Station, Indian Lake, NY, NRHP-listed
- Hadley Mountain Fire Observation Station, Hadley, NY, NRHP-listed
- Hurricane Mountain Fire Observation Station, Keene, NY, NRHP-listed
- Kane Mountain Fire Observation Station, Caroga, NY, NRHP-listed
- Loon Lake Mountain Fire Observation Station, Franklin, NY, NRHP-listed
- Lyon Mountain Fire Observation Station
- Mount Adams Fire Observation Station, Newcomb, NY, NRHP-listed
- Owls Head Mountain Forest Fire Observation Station
- Pillsbury Mountain Forest Fire Observation Station, Arietta, NY, NRHP-listed
- Poke-O-Moonshine Mountain Fire Observation Station, Chesterfield, NY, NRHP-listed
- St. Regis Mountain Fire Observation Station, Santa Clara, NY, NRHP-listed
- Snowy Mountain Fire Observation Station, Indian Lake, NY, NRHP-listed
- Wakely Mountain Fire Observation Station, Lake Pleasant, NY, NRHP-listed

Catskill Park

- Catskill Mountain fire towers
- Balsam Lake Mountain Fire Observation Station, Hardenburgh, NY, NRHP-listed
- Hunter Mountain Fire Tower, Hunter, NY, NRHP-listed
- Mount Tremper Fire Observation Station, Shandaken, NY, NRHP-listed
- Red Hill Fire Observation Station, Denning, NY, NRHP-listed

Other

- Dickinson Hill Fire Tower, Grafton, NY, NRHP-listed
- Harlem Fire Watchtower, New York, NY, NRHP-listed
- Mt. Beacon Fire Observation Tower, Beacon, NY, NRHP-listed
- Sterling Mountain Fire Observation Tower and Observer's Cabin, Greenwood Lake, NY, NRHP-listed

=== North Carolina ===
- Cape Lookout Village Historic District, Harkers Island, NC, NRHP-listed
- Warren County Fire Tower, Liberia, NC, NRHP-listed
- US Naval Ordnance Testing Facility Observation Tower No. 2, Topsail Beach, NC

=== Oregon ===
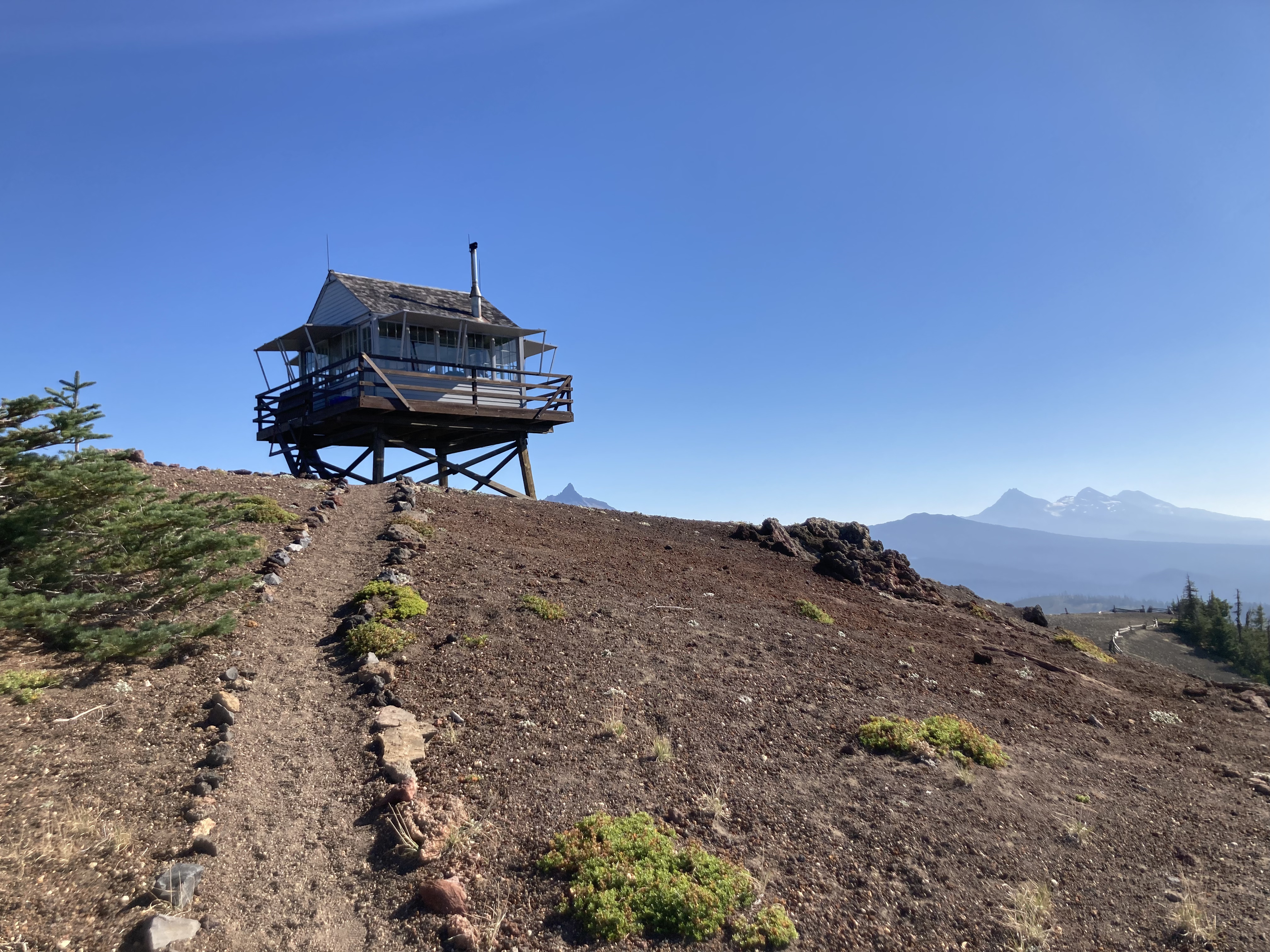
Sand Mountain Lookout with the Three Sisters

- Carpenter Mountain Lookout
- Hager Mountain
- Hershberger Mountain Lookout, Prospect, NRHP-listed
- Hoodoo Ridge Lookout
- Kirkland Lookout Ground House, Joseph, NRHP-listed
- Mt. Stella Lookout, Prospect, NRHP-listed
- Pelican Butte
- Sand Mountain Lookout
- Squaw Peak Lookout, Jacksonville, NRHP-listed
- Yamsay Mountain
- Waldo Mountain Fire Lookout
- Watchman Lookout Station
- Watchman Lookout Station No. 68, Fort Klamath, NRHP-listed

=== Pennsylvania ===
- William Penn Memorial Fire Tower, Reading

=== South Dakota ===
- Harney Peak, now known as Black Elk Peak, rock tower built in 1938 by CCC, last staffed in 1967
- Fort Lookout IV, Oacoma, South Dakota, NRHP-listed
- Elk Mountain Fire Tower, Hells Canyon District, Black Hills, measured as the tallest fire tower in the country, at 80+ feet tall
- Bear Mountain Fire Lookout Tower, Pennington County, still in service, 7166'; original tower was built in 1910 of logs, replaced with 30' metal tower in 1939
- Custer Peak Fire Lookout, Lawrence County, 6713' original wooden tower built in 1911, replaced in 1935 and replaced with the current rock lookout tower in 1941
- Summit Ridge Fire Lookout, 6,082', 67.5' tower, last staffed in 1972
- Rankin Ridge Fire Lookout, Wind Cave National Park, replaced the Crow's Nest Peak tower, 5,013'
- Mt Coolidge Fire Lookout Custer State Park, still in service
- Battle Mountain Fire Lookout, Hot Springs, Fall River County, 4,363', 22' tower
- Seth Bullock/Scruton Mt Fire Lookout, Pennington County, SD, 5,817', wood tower built in 1939, replaced in 1975 with metal tower

SD lookout towers that no longer exist

- Crook's Tower
- Crow's Nest Peak
- Parker Peak
- Signal Hill

=== Tennessee ===
- Ripley Fire Lookout Tower, Ripley, NRHP-listed

=== Utah ===
- Ute Mountain Fire Tower, Manila, NRHP-listed

=== Vermont ===
- Stratton Mountain Lookout Tower, Stratton, NRHP-listed

=== Washington ===
As of 2022, 93 lookouts in Washington State are still in existence, down from a 1950s high of between 660 and 685.

Blue Mountains of Washington

- Big Butte
- Clearwater Lookout
- Oregon Butte
- Table Rock

North Cascades center - Hozameen Range of Washington

- Desolation Peak Lookout, Hozameen, NRHP-listed
- Monument 83 Peak

North Cascades east - Okanogan Range

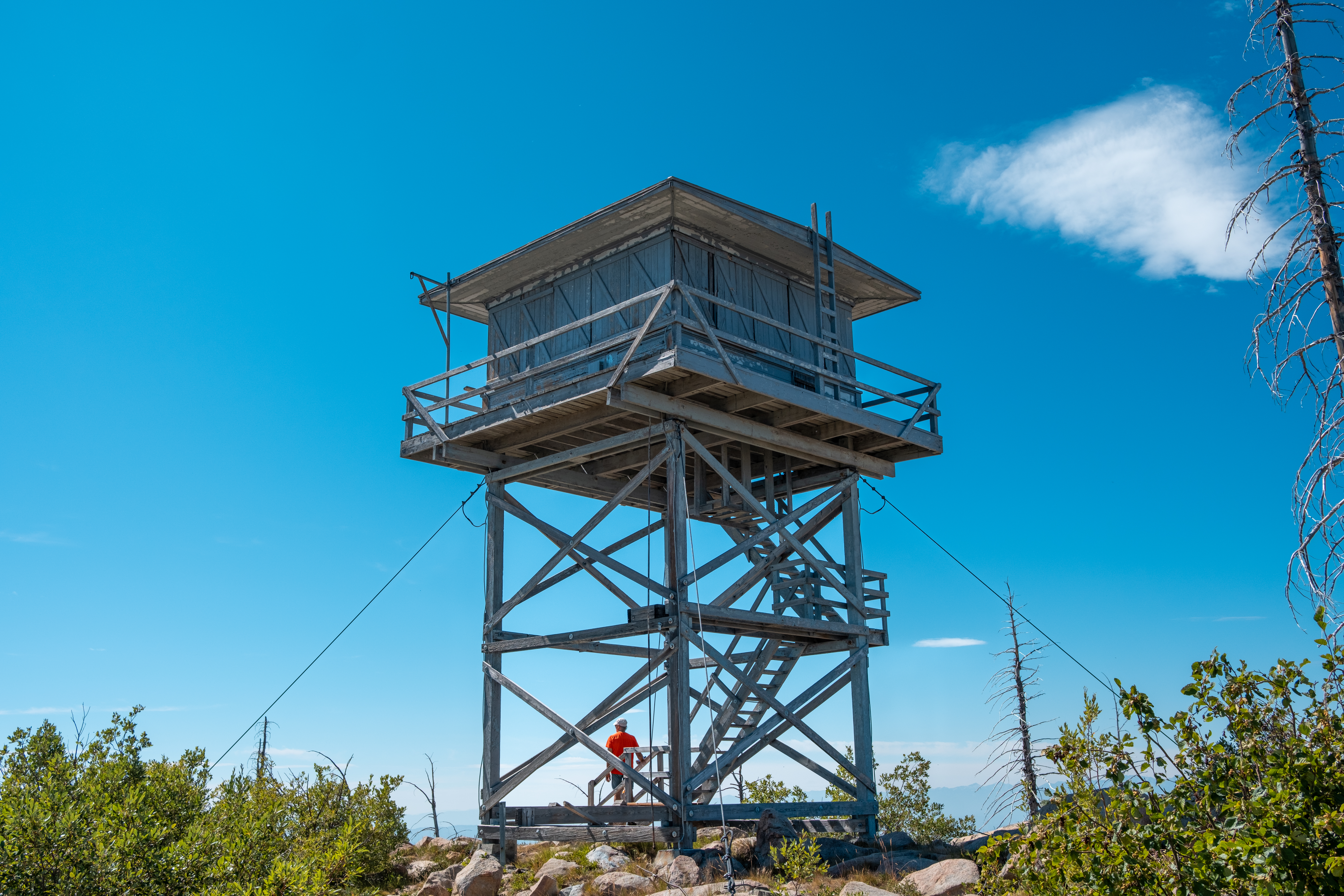
Buck Mountain Lookout, near Twisp, Washington State

- Aeneas Mountain
- Buck Mountain
- First Butte
- Funk Mountain
- Goat Peak
- Knowlton Knob
- Mebee Pass Lookout
- Mount Leecher
  - Leecher Crow's Nest Lookout Site
- North Twentymile Peak
- Okanogan Post Office Lookout Site
- Slate Peak lookout

North Cascades east - Methow Mountains

- Lookout Mountain

North Cascades west - Skagit Range

- Copper Mountain Fire Lookout, Newhalem, NRHP-listed
- Park Butte Lookout, Sedro Wooley, NRHP-listed
- Sourdough Mountain Lookout, Diablo, NRHP-listed
- Winchester Mountain Lookout, Sedro Wooley, NRHP-listed

North Cascades south - Glacier Peak area

- Hidden Lake Peaks
  - Hidden Lake Peak Lookout, Marblemount, NRHP-listed
- Green Mountain Lookout, Darrington, NRHP-listed
- Lookout Mountain
- Miners Ridge Lookout, Darrington, NRHP-listed

North Cascades south - Mountain Loop area

- Three Fingers Lookout, Darrington, NRHP-listed
- Mount Pilchuck Lookout
- North Mountain Lookout
- Darrington Ranger Station Lookout Site

Central Cascades west - Alpine lakes area

- Alpine Lookout
- Evergreen Mountain Lookout, Skykomish, WA, NRHP-listed
- Granite Mountain Lookout
- Heybrook Ridge
- Thorp Mountain Lookout

Central Cascades east - Chelan, Entiat, Wenatchee Mountains

- Badger Mountain Lookout, East Wenatchee, WA, NRHP-listed
- Chelan Butte Lookout, Chelan, WA, NRHP-listed
- Red Top Mountain lookout
- Steliko Lookout
- Sugarloaf Peak Lookout, Leavenworth, WA, NRHP-listed
- Tyee Mountain Lookout, Entiat, WA, NRHP-listed

Southern Cascades north - Goat Rocks

- Jumpoff Lookout

Southern Cascades north - Mount Rainier Area

- Mount Fremont Fire Lookout
  - Mt. Fremont Fire Lookout, Sunrise, WA, NRHP-listed
- Tolmie Peak Fire Lookout, Mowich Lake Entrance, WA, NRHP-listed
- High Rock
- Gobbler's Knob Fire Lookout, Nisqually Entrance, WA, NRHP-listed
- Sun Top Lookout, Enumclaw, WA, NRHP-listed
- Puyallup Ridge Lookout
- Watch Mountain-West Peak
- Goodman Hill

Southern Cascades - Crest

- Shriner Peak Fire Lookout, Ohanapecosh, WA, NRHP-listed
- Kelly Butte

Southern Cascades central - Mount Adams area

- Burley Mountain
- French Butte Lookout - destroyed
- Meadow Butte
- Mount Adams
- Red Mountain
- Signal Peak

Southern Cascades south - Columbia Gorge

- Satus Peak
- Lorena Butte Lookout

Kitsap Peninsula

- Kitsap Lookout

Okanogan Highlands and Kettle River Range

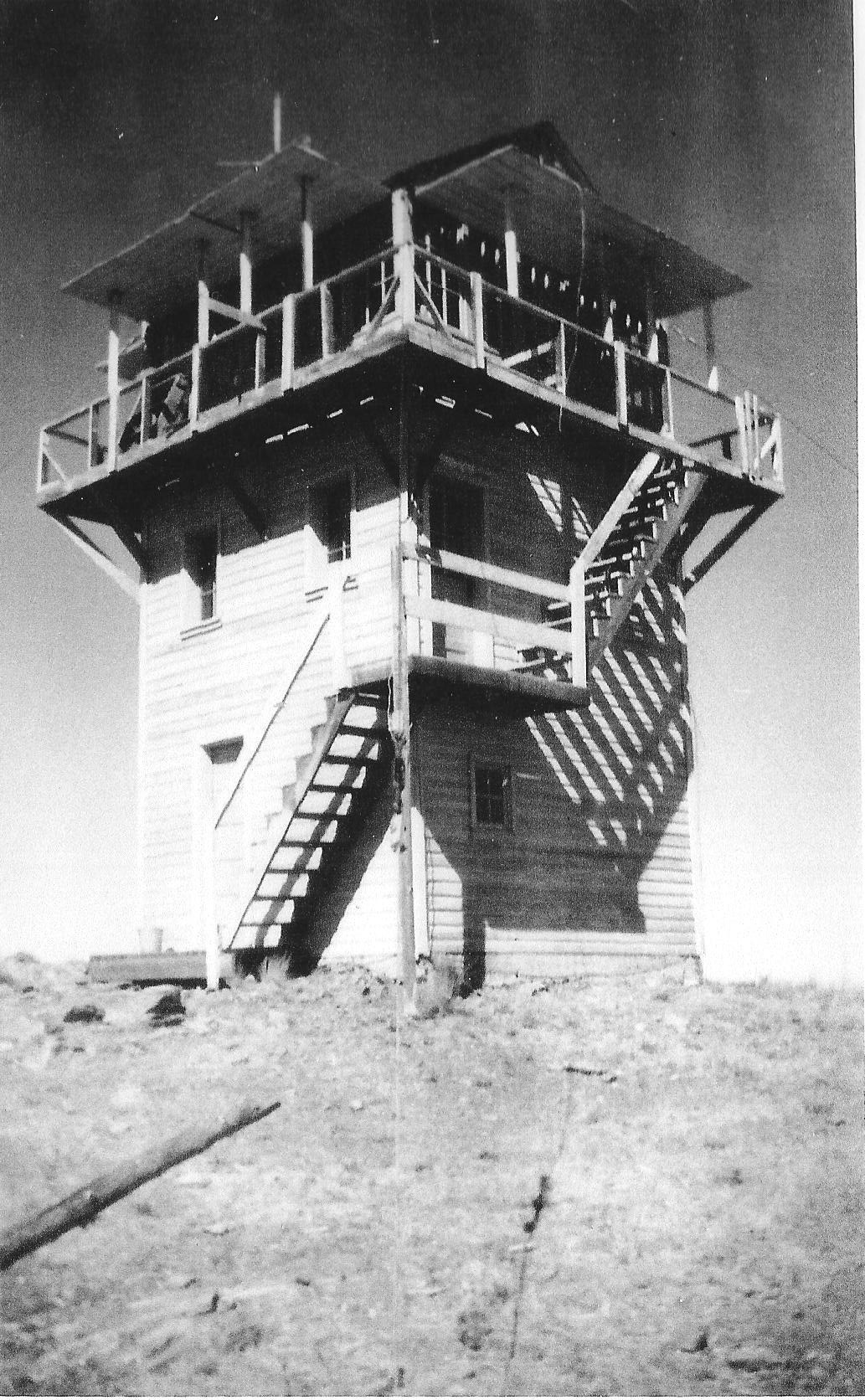
Bodie Mountain Lookout, 1930s to 1960s

- Armstrong Mountain
- Bodie Mountain Lookout
- Cody Butte
- Columbia Mountain
- Cornell Butte
- Franson Peak
- Gold Mountain
- Grizzly Mountain Lookout
- Keller Butte
- Lynx Mountain-Cabin Lookout Site
- Johnny George Mountain
- Mount Bonaparte Lookout
- Moses Mountain
- Omak Mountain
- Strawberry Mountain
- Tunk Mountain
- Whitestone Ridge
- Whitmore Mountain
  - Whitmore L-4 Cab Lookout Site

Olympic Mountains

- Dodger Point Fire Lookout, Port Angeles, WA, NRHP-listed
- Ned Hill
- North Point
- Pyramid Peak Aircraft Warning Service Lookout, Port Angeles, WA, NRHP-listed

San Juan Islands

- Mount Constitution

Selkirks in Washington

- Diamond Peak - Patrol Lookout Site
- Lookout Mountain
- Indian Mountain
- Mount Spokane
- Quartz Mountain
- Salmo Mountain Lookout
- South Baldy Lookout
- Sullivan Mountain
- Timber Mountain
- Tower Mountain
- Wellpinit Mountain

Others

- Kloshe Nanitch Lookout

Lookout trees

- Cook Creek Spar Tree, cut down in 1955 due to rot,
- Lookout tree constructed in 1918 near Darrington, Washington; abandoned as a lookout in the 1930s, it can be reached by the Lookout Tree Trail.

=== West Virginia ===
- Olson Observation Tower

=== Wisconsin ===
- Fifield Fire Lookout Tower, Fifield, WI, NRHP-listed
- Mountain Fire Lookout Tower, Riverview, WI, NRHP-listed

=== Wyoming ===
- Cement Ridge Fire Lookout, Beulah, WY, active
- Huckleberry Mountain Fire Lookout, Teton National Forest, WY, NRHP-listed
- Clay Butte, Shoshone National Forest, WY, NRHP-listed, active, last staffed during Summer 2024 season

== Norway ==
- Linnekleppen (staffed 1908–present day)
- Skjellingshovde
- Haukenesfjellet (Note: Used for fire monitoring until 1975.)
- Rafjellet (Note: Being used as a radio transmission station.)
- Mistberget (Note: Constructed in 1938. Cabin still present and in use as public observation tower today.)
- Elgheia
- Kjerringhøgda (Note: Constructed in 1952 and staffed until early 1970s. The cabin was removed and the tower was converted to a public observation point in the year 2000.)
- Furukollen (Note: While sources refer to it as a fire lookout tower, it is unclear if it was ever staffed and in which time period.)
- Hornkjølberget
- Blåenga
- Trollerudåsen
- Årkjøltårnet
- Garsjøberg-tårnet

== See also ==
- List of fire stations
- List of towers
- List of observation towers
