= Lookout tree =

Tree serving as a watchtower against fires

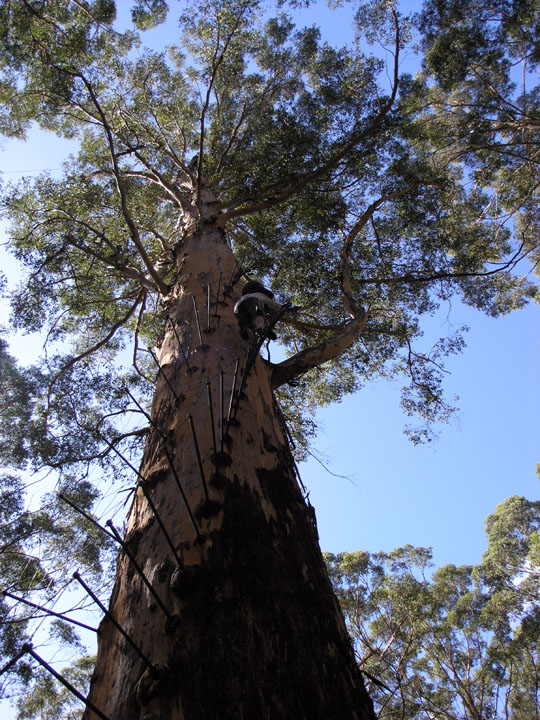
Gloucester Tree.

A lookout tree is a simple fire lookout tower created by attaching a ladder or a series of spikes to a tall straight tree with a view of the surrounding lands, allowing rangers or fire crews to conveniently climb the tree to survey their surroundings. The simplest kind consist only of a ladder to a suitable height: this kind was called a "ladder tree." Some ladder trees had platforms on the ground next to them for maps and a fire finder. A more elaborate version often created a platform on top of the tree trunk by cutting off approximately the last 10 feet (3.0 m) of the treetop and building a railed wooden platform on the resulting stump. These "platform trees" were often equipped with telephones, fire finder tables, seats and guy wires. Accommodation for the watcher was provided by a tent or shelter at the bottom of the tree.

Lookout trees were widely used in the Kaibab National Forest of northern Arizona, and Washington, United States as well as in Australia. The Dave Evans Bicentennial Tree in Western Australia reaches 75m, while the tallest lookout in the United States was the Cook Creek Spar Tree near Lake Quinault, Washington, at 179 feet (55 m) high from 1927 to 1955.

== Australia ==
Eight karri trees were adapted as lookout trees in Western Australia in the 1930s and 1940s. The 72-metre (236 ft) Gloucester Tree features a cabin in its top and may be climbed by visitors, as can the even taller 75-metre (246 ft) Dave Evans Bicentennial Tree. The Diamond Tree continues in occasional use as a fire lookout.

== United States ==
Lookout trees were used as ad hoc towers throughout the American West in the early 20th century. The most significant concentrations were in northern Arizona and the Coast Range of Washington and Oregon.

=== Arizona ===
Many of the surviving lookout trees in Arizona have been placed on the National Register of Historic Places. Lookout trees in Kaibab National Forest were used from about 1916 until the 1960s. Some of the early trees were replaced by towers built by the Civilian Conservation Corps in the 1930s.

=== Arkansas ===
The Look See Tree in Coleman, Arkansas was used as a fire lookout for roughly ten to fifteen years from c. 1930 to c. 1940.

=== Washington ===
Although the Cook Creek Spar Tree was cut down in 1955 due to rot, another lookout tree remains, constructed in 1918 near Darrington, Washington. Abandoned as a lookout in the 1930s, it can be reached by the Lookout Tree Trail.

== See also ==
- List of fire lookout towers
