= Swiftcurrent Mountain =

Mountain in Montana, United States

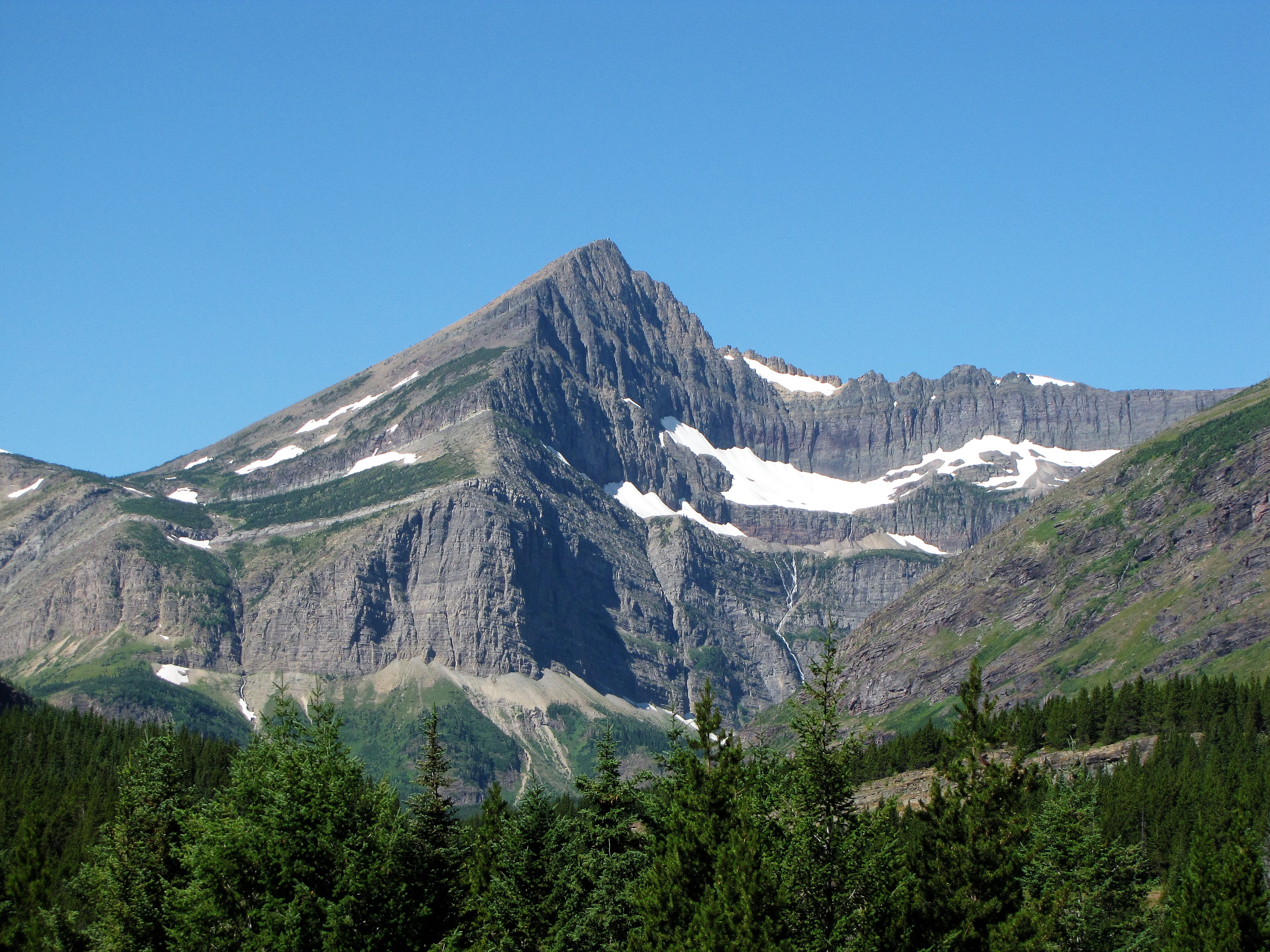
- Swiftcurrent Mountain, from the Many Glacier area

Highest point
- Elevation: 8,440 ft (2,570 m)
- Prominence: 676 ft (206 m)
- Coordinates: 48°47′09″N 113°46′00″W

Geography
- Location within Montana Location within the United States
- Location: Flathead County / Glacier County; Montana, U.S.
- Parent range: Lewis Range
- Topo map(s): USGS Ahern Pass, MT

Swiftcurrent Mountain (8,440 feet; 2,573 m) is located in the Lewis Range, Glacier National Park in the U.S. state of Montana. Swiftcurrent Mountain is situated along the Continental Divide. The historic Swiftcurrent Fire Lookout is at the top of the mountain.

== Geology ==
Like other mountains in Glacier National Park, the peak is composed of sedimentary rock laid down during the Precambrian to Jurassic periods. Formed in shallow seas, this sedimentary rock was initially uplifted beginning 170 million years ago when the Lewis Overthrust fault pushed an enormous slab of precambrian rocks 3 mi (4.8 km) thick, 50 miles (80 km) wide and 160 miles (260 km) long over younger rock of the cretaceous period.

== Climate ==
Based on the Köppen climate classification, the peak is located in an alpine subarctic climate zone with long, cold, snowy winters, and cool to warm summers. Temperatures can drop below −10 °F with wind chill factors below −30 °F.

== Gallery ==
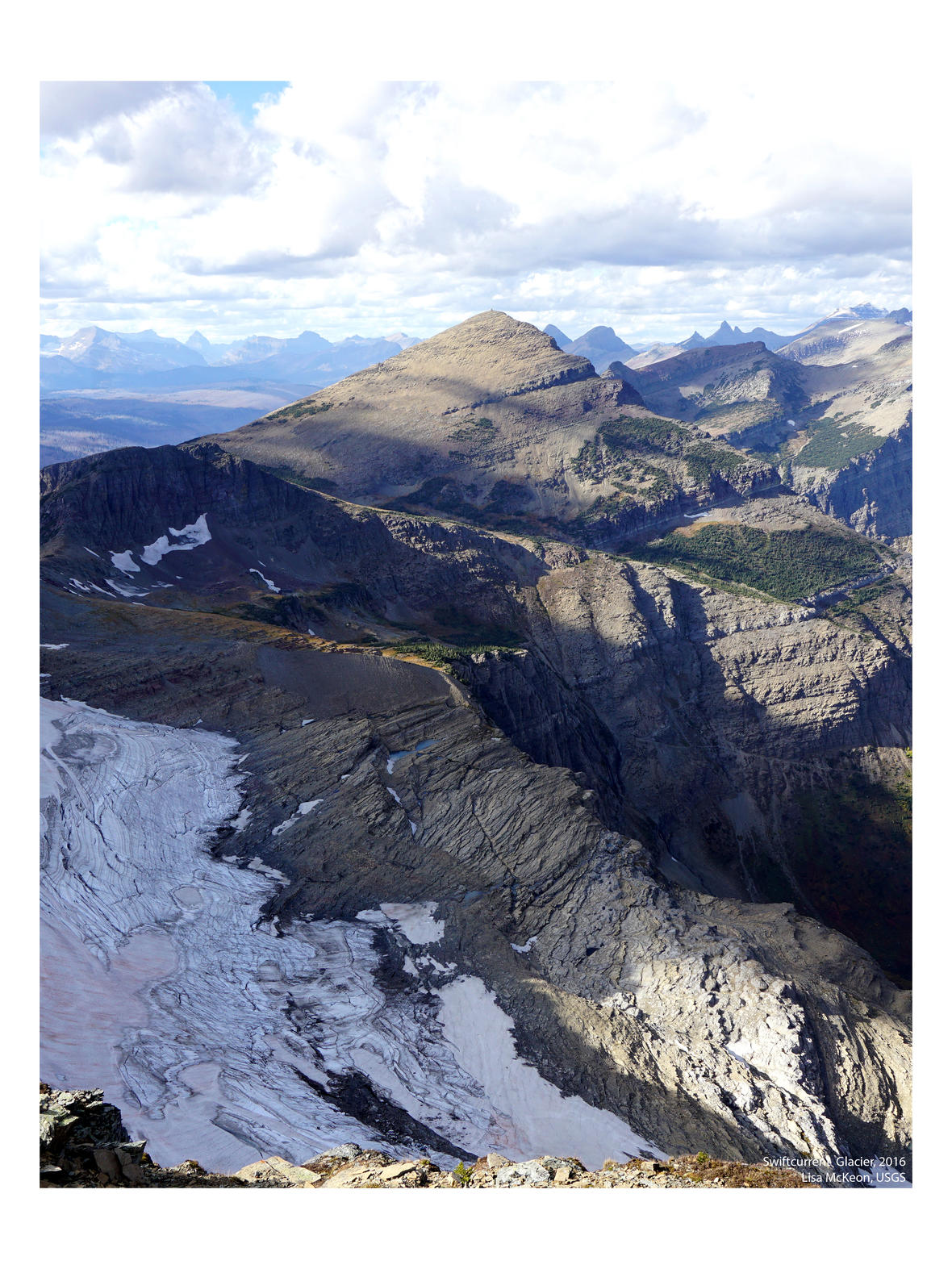
South aspect, with Swiftcurrent Glacier

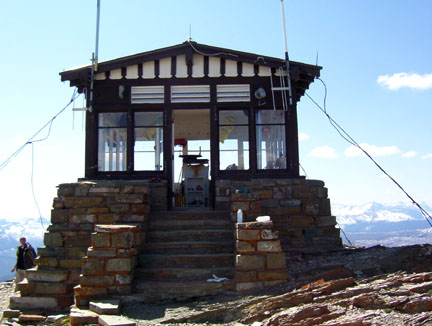
Swiftcurrent Fire Lookout at the summit of Swiftcurrent Mountain

== See also ==
- Mountains and mountain ranges of Glacier National Park (U.S.)
