= Steliko Lookout =

Fire lookout tower in Washington, United States

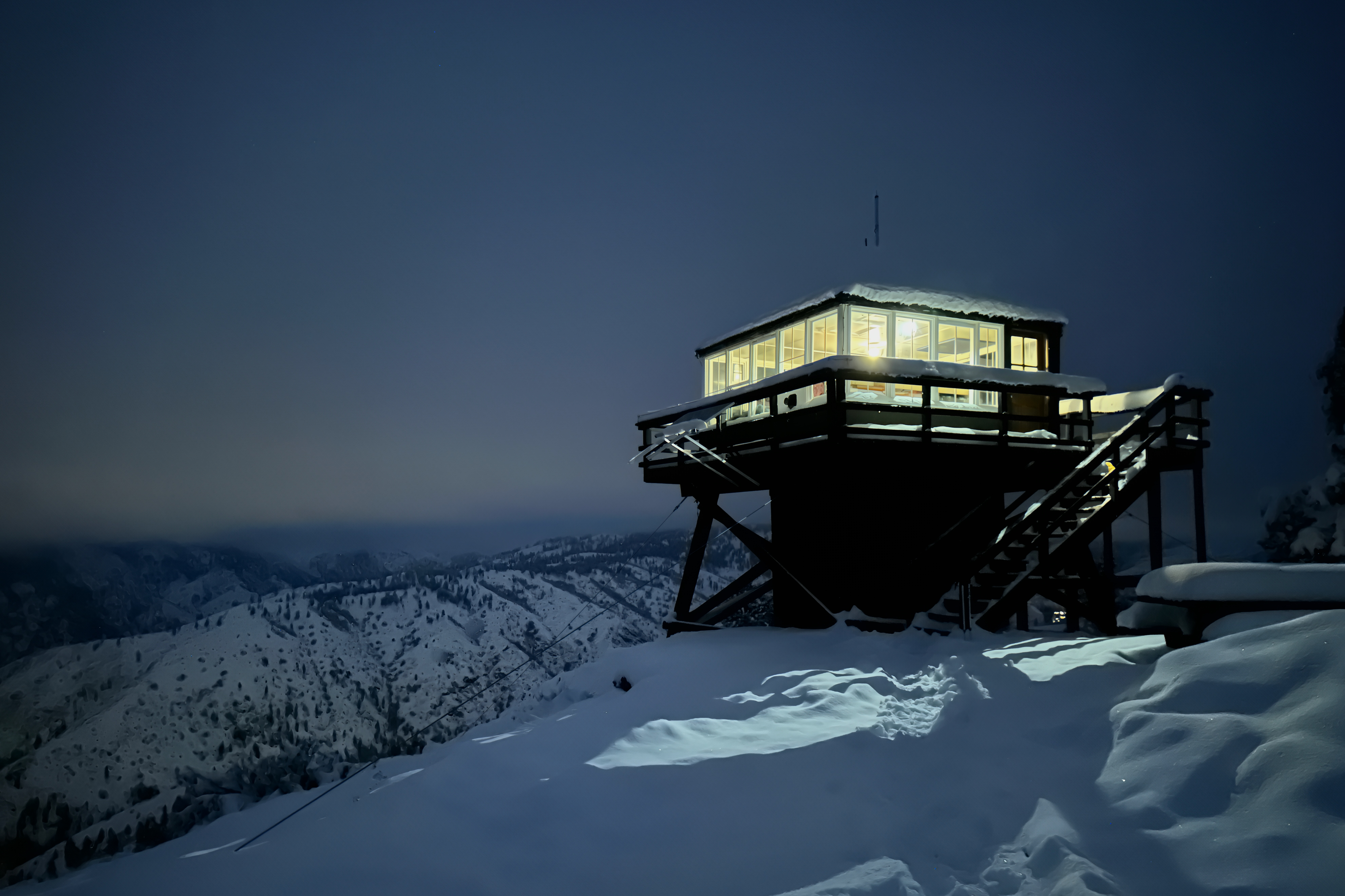
- Steliko Lookout at night during winter

- Location in Washington

General information
- Type: Fire lookout tower
- Location: Steliko Point, Okanogan–Wenatchee National Forest, Chelan County, Washington, U.S.
- Coordinates: 47.74054°N 120.34405°W
- Elevation: 2,581 ft (787 m)
- Construction started: 1947
- Completed: 1947
- Owner: United States Forest Service
- Management: United States Forest Service

Height
- Height: 10 ft (3.0 m)

Steliko Lookout is a historic fire lookout tower on Steliko Point in the Entiat Mountains of Chelan County, Washington, United States. The fire tower stands at 2,581 feet (787 m) above sea level in the Okanogan–Wenatchee National Forest. It is one of three remaining fire lookouts on the Entiat Ranger District, along with Sugarloaf Peak and Tyee Mountain.

Originally staffed as part of the United States Forest Service fire detection network, Steliko Lookout is now primarily used as a public overnight rental administered through Recreation.gov in partnership with local non-profit organizations. The site is listed on the National Historic Lookout Register.

== Description ==
Steliko Lookout is a standard Forest Service L-4 cab constructed on a 10 feet (3.0 m) timber tower at the summit of Steliko Point, a low, grassy summit above the Entiat River valley. The cab provides nearly 360-degree views of the Entiat Valley, the small community of Ardenvoir directly below, and surrounding summits including Tyee Mountain and Sugarloaf Peak.

The structure is wired to commercial power, an uncommon feature for fire lookouts in Washington, and retains a catwalk around the cab for observation. Inside, the lookout contains built-in bunks, a small kitchen area, table and seating, LED lighting, a propane heater or stove, and basic furnishings. An outhouse and picnic table are located nearby, but there is no running water and visitors are required to pack in drinking water and supplies.

The summit elevation of Steliko Point is approximately 2,581 feet (787 m), giving the lookout modest prominence compared with higher Cascade peaks but unobstructed views up and down the Entiat River drainage.

== History ==
Fire detection at Steliko Point dates to at least 1925, when the site was used as a lookout camp and viewing location. The present L-4 tower was constructed in 1947 by the United States Forest Service as part of a post-war program to standardize mountaintop fire lookouts in the region. At the peak of the lookout era, the Entiat Ranger District operated 13 staffed fire lookouts; by the early 21st century only Steliko, Sugarloaf and Tyee remained standing.

Steliko Lookout was staffed during fire seasons through roughly the mid-1990s, and intermittently thereafter during periods of high fire danger.The lookout continued to be used for emergency fire detection during electrical storms and is one of the few towers close enough to be connected to the regional power grid.

In 2010 the lookout suffered vandalism when thieves removed several solar panels and a generator, causing thousands of dollars in damage. Beginning in 2018–2019, volunteers worked with the Forest Service to rehabilitate the structure, replacing flooring, repainting, installing new doors, windows and siding, building new bed platforms and updating the small kitchen area in preparation for use as a rental cabin.

== Recreation and access ==
Steliko Lookout sits in the Entiat Mountains, a sub-range of the eastern Cascade Range, and can be reached either by road or by a short hike. From the town of Entiat, drivers follow the Entiat River Road to Ardenvoir and then continue on National Forest Road 5310, which climbs to Steliko Point. The Forest Service and recreation guides describe the road as steep, narrow and partly single-lane, with deep sand in places, and recommend high-clearance four-wheel-drive vehicles when driving all the way to the summit.

During summer and fall, visitors can usually drive to or near the lookout, subject to current road conditions. In winter and early spring, a gate on Road 5310 is closed and access is by a 1.6 miles (2.6 km) walk, snowshoe, ski or snowmobile from the closure point at the Steliko work center below. The hike has been described as a moderate, about 3.4 miles (5.5 km) round trip with roughly 1,500 feet (460 m) of elevation gain along the road to the summit.

Because of its relatively low elevation and short approach, Steliko is considered more accessible year-round than many other Washington fire lookouts and is sometimes promoted by hiking organizations as a winter or shoulder-season destination. Views from the summit include the Entiat Valley, the Columbia River drainage and nearby peaks of the Entiat Mountains.

== Overnight rental ==
Following renovation work by volunteers and Forest Service staff, Steliko Lookout was added to the Forest Service cabin rental program in 2021. The lookout opened for public overnight stays at a nightly rate set by the Forest Service, with reservations available up to six months in advance via Recreation.gov. The agency entered into an agreement with the local non-profit to assist with on-the-ground management of the rental, including maintenance and visitor support.

The cabin is typically available for vehicle access rentals from mid-April through mid-November, depending on snow and road conditions, and for human-powered access outside that window when the road is gated.. Forest Service requires that guests bring their own water, bedding, food and cooking supplies, and caution that the elevated structure, catwalk and steep stairs pose fall hazards, especially in windy or icy conditions.

Although modern aerial and satellite detection have largely replaced staffed fire towers in the area, Steliko Lookout continues to be used occasionally by Forest Service personnel during periods of elevated fire danger.

== See also ==
- Fire lookout tower
- List of fire lookout towers
