= Buck Mountain Lookout Tower =

Fire lookout house

- Location within the United States
- 34.666970°N 111.415170°W
- Location: Coconino National Forest, Coconino County, Arizona, USA

History
- Built: 1933 or 1939

Site notes
- Area: 60 by 60 feet (18 m × 18 m)
- Architectural style: CT-2

Buck Mountain Lookout Tower is a groundhouse and fire lookout in the Coronado National Forest in Arizona, United States. It was constructed in 1933 or 1939. The structure was designated as a National Historic Lookout on April 1, 2001, and was added to the National Register of Historic Places on December 14, 1987. The lookout house's boundary has dimensions of 80 by 80 feet (24 by 24 meters) and is situated at an elevation of 7,541 feet (2,298 m). It has a has an R-3 modified L-4 14' by 14' cab with a catwalk. It is one of few remaining CT-2 towers in America.
