= Moqui Lookout Cabin =

Destroyed fire lookout house

Moqui Lookout House
- Location within the United States
- 34.564180°N 111.169300°W
- Location: Coconino National Forest, Coconino County, Arizona, USA

History
- Built: 1952

Site notes
- Area: 14 by 14 feet (4.3 m × 4.3 m)

Moqui Lookout House is a groundhouse and fire lookout in the Coronado National Forest in Arizona, United States. It was constructed in 1952 to replace an Aermotor fire tower constructed in 1930. The structure was designated as a National Historic Lookout on March 15, 2006. The lookout house has dimensions of 14 by 14 feet (4.3 by 4.3 meters) and is situated at an elevation of 7,476 feet (2,279 m). The house is located at N 34.564180° W -111.169300°.
