= Lookout trees in Kaibab National Forest =

- U.S. National Register of Historic Places
- Location within Arizona Location within the United States
- Area: less than one acre
- MPS: National Forest Fire Lookouts in the Southwestern Region TR
- NRHP reference No.: 64000046
- Added to NRHP: January 13, 1992

The lookout trees in Kaibab National Forest are the survivors of a system of improvised fire lookout towers that used tall, straight trees as vantage points. The practice of using trees as lookouts was widespread in the western United States during the early 20th century, as there was no need to build a foundation or to pack and assemble a tower structure. Instead, a prominent tree could be selected, and a ladder or a series of spikes could be attached to the tree trunk. For transient use this could be all that was done, but for more permanent use the top 10 feet (3.0 m) of the tree could be lopped, and a platform constructed on the resulting stump. This railed platform was then outfitted with a seat and a platform for an Osborne Fire Finder.

A Multiple Property Submission survey of lookout trees in Kaibab National Forest and Grand Canyon National Park in northern Arizona was carried out in 1987 as an addendum to a survey of fire towers in Arizona. Surviving trees with significant remains of their lookout function were individually listed on the National Register of Historic Places and were described in the MPS. Many of these lookouts were established between 1905 and 1920. Many more trees existed than were nominated, but the missing trees have either disappeared or were not located. No lookout trees were noted in Grand Canyon National Park, though some had existed.

- Cooper Ridge Lookout Tree, reference number 91001962,
- Corral Lake Lookout Tree, reference number 91001954,
- Fracas Lookout Tree, reference number 91001955,
- Grandview Lookout Tree, reference number 91001945,
- Hull Tank Lookout Tree, reference number 91001947,
- Little Mountain Lookout Tree, reference number 91001950,
- Summit Mountain Lookout Tree, reference number 91001948,
- Tater Point Lookout Tree, reference number 91001946,
- Telephone Hill Lookout Tree, reference number 91001952,
- Tipover Lookout Tree, reference number 91001953,
- Tusayan Lookout Tree, reference number 91001951,

All were individually listed on the National Register of Historic Places on January 13, 1992.
