= Diamond Point Lookout =

Fire lookout

- Location within the United States
- 34.290820°N 111.192750°W
- Location: Tonto National Forest, Gila County, Arizona, US

History
- Built: 1936

Site notes
- Area: 60 by 60 feet (18 m × 18 m)
- Architectural style: Region 3 L-4
- Governing body: U.S. Forest Service

Diamond Point Lookout is a fire lookout in the Tonto National Forest in Arizona, United States. It was constructed in 1936. The structure was designated as a National Historic Lookout on July 20, 2002. The lookout house has dimensions of 12 by 12 feet (3.7 by 3.7 meters) and is situated at an elevation of 6,157 feet (1,877 m).
