= Basalt Hill Lookout =

Fire lookout house

- Location within the United States
- 37.019080°N 121.086310°W
- Location: Los Banos, Merced County, California, USA

History
- Built: 1945/1947

Site notes
- Area: 60 by 60 feet (18 m × 18 m)

Basalt Hill Lookout is a groundhouse and fire lookout overlooking the San Luis Reservoir State Recreation Area in California, United States. It was constructed in 1947 or 1945. The structure was designated as a National Historic Lookout on June 19, 2010, following nomination by Brad Eels. The lookout consists of a CalFire octagonal cab on a tower. The cab has dimensions of 16 by 16 feet (4.9 by 4.9 meters) and the tower has dimensions of 20 by 20 feet (6.1 by 6.1 meters). The lookout is situated at an elevation of 1,700 feet (520 m). The site is administered by the Department of Forestry and Fire Protection. It has three floors, with the top floor being the observation room. At least one instance of the lease being renewed is known, that being on November 3, 1992, by Raymond Tatian. This site also prominently features his full phone number, place of employment, and P.O. box address.
