= Bear Mountain Lookout Complex =

Fire Lookout Complex

- Location within the United States
- 33.533530°N 109.144520°W
- Location: Apache-Sitgreaves National Forest, Greenlee County, Arizona, USA

History
- Built: 1933

Site notes
- Architect: Likely the Civilian Conservation Corps
- Architectural style: 46' Aermotor LX-25 tower with 7’x7' metal cab
- Governing body: United States Forest Service

Bear Mountain Lookout Complex is an Arizona Fire lookout within the Apache-Sitgreaves National Forest. It was installed in 1933. It was registered as a national historic lookout on March 4, 2002. It possesses dimensions of 7 feet by 7 feet, and stands at an elevation of 8,538 feet. It is 49 feet 9 inches in height. Its boundary is a rectangle with an area of 300 feet by 200 feet. It was likely built by the Civilian Conservation Corps.
