= Jacob Lake Lookout Tower =

NRHP site in Coconino County, Arizona

- U.S. National Register of Historic Places
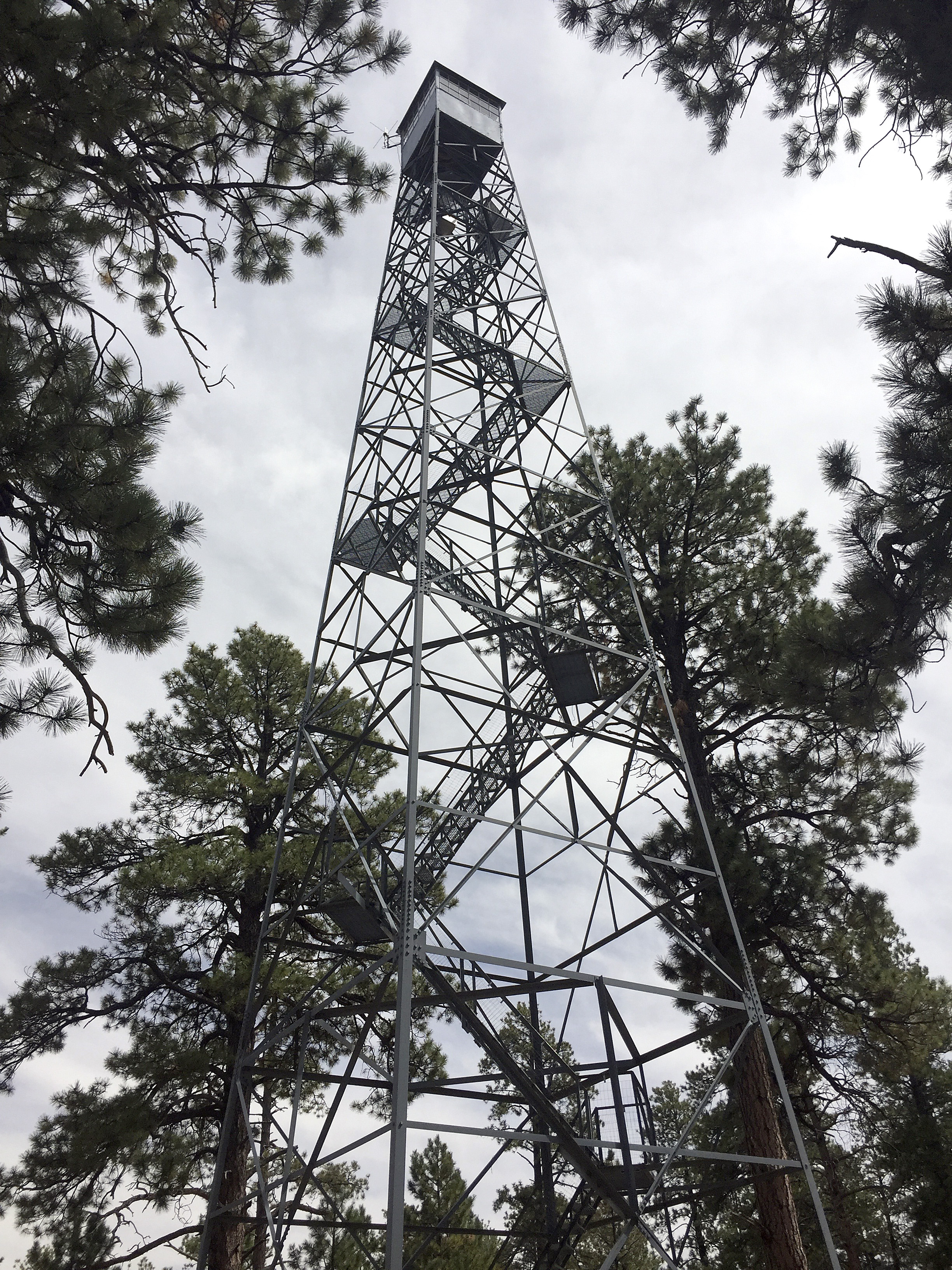
- Location: Grand Canyon Hwy., Jacob Lake, Arizona
- Coordinates: 36°41′59″N 112°12′50″W
- Area: less than one acre
- Built: 1934
- MPS: National Forest Fire Lookouts in the Southwestern Region TR
- NRHP reference No.: 87002477
- Added to NRHP: January 28, 1988

Jacob Lake Lookout Tower is located in the North Kaibab Ranger District 30 miles (48 km) southeast of Fredonia, AZ.

== Background ==
Built in 1934 by the Civilian Conservation Corps (CCC), it is an 80 feet (24 m) Aermotor steel tower with a 7 by 7 feet (2.1 m × 2.1 m) metal cab and is listed on the National Register of Historic Places. Visitors can read about the lookout process and can still climb the tower to view the area and see the Osborne Fire Finder. The site is listed in the National Historic Lookout Register, which recognizes the fire-lookout sites across the United States, which recognises lookout sites, structures and towers for their cultural and historic significance.
