= Big Hole Lookout =

Restored fire lookout in Montana, US

Big Hole Lookout is a decommissioned US Forest Service fire lookout located in the Lolo National Forest approximately 13 miles northwest of Plains, Montana in Sanders County. On April 29, 2009, Big Hole Lookout was added to the National Historic Lookout Register.

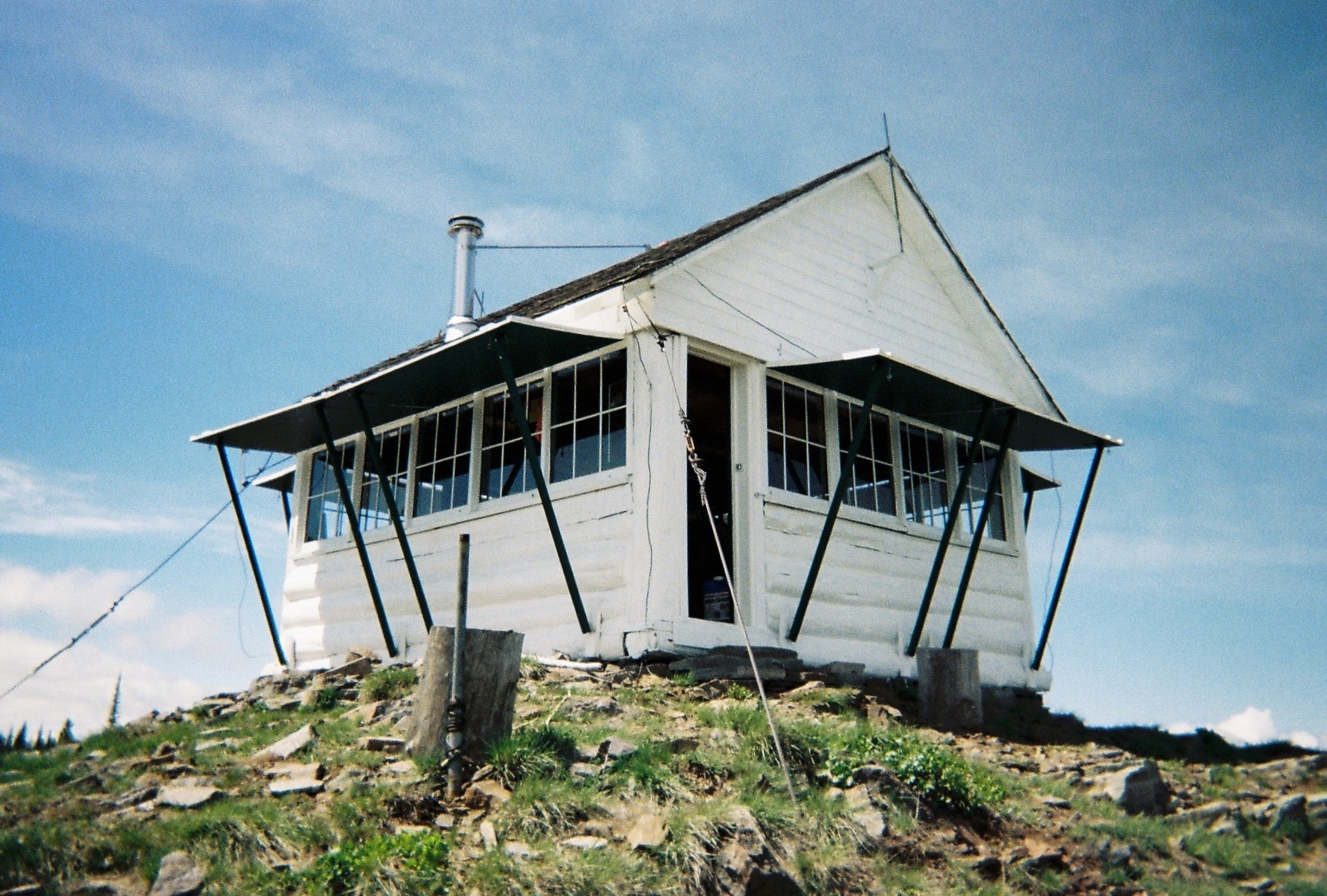
Big Hole Lookout in June 2022

== History and construction ==
Big Hole Lookout is a 14'x14' (196 ft²) Grange-Hall type lookout built in 1930. The lookout was seasonally staffed by the US Forest Service from 1930 until 1972, when it was abandoned. After decades of abandonment volunteers finished restoring the building in 2017. Big Hole Lookout was made available for public rental in 2021, for $45 a night.

== Geography and location ==
The Lookout is located in the Thompson/Plains Ranger District of the Lolo National Forest. The lookout sits just southeast of Big Hole Peak at an elevation of 6,922 ft (2,110 m)

== Access ==
The only way to access Big Hole Lookout is via the Big Hole Lookout Trail, a 3-mile hike or horseback ride from the trailhead.
