= Deer Springs Lookout Complex =

Fire Lookout Complex

- Location within the United States
- 34.306100°N 110.420300°W
- Location: Apache-Sitgreaves National Forest, Navajo County, Arizona, USA

History
- Built: 1923

Site notes
- Architectural style: Aermotor LL-25 tower with 7’x7' metal cab

Deer Springs Lookout Complex is an Arizona Fire lookout within the Apache-Sitgreaves National Forest. It was built in 1923 or 1926. It was registered as a national historic lookout on March 4, 2002, and listed on the National Register of Historic Places on December 14, 1987. It possesses dimensions of 50 feet by 50 feet, with a metal cab possessing dimensions of 7 feet by 7 feet, and stands at an elevation of 7,235 feet. Its boundary is a square with an area of 130 feet by 100 feet. The ladder was replaced sometime in the 1930s.
