= Atascosa Lookout House =

Destroyed fire lookout house

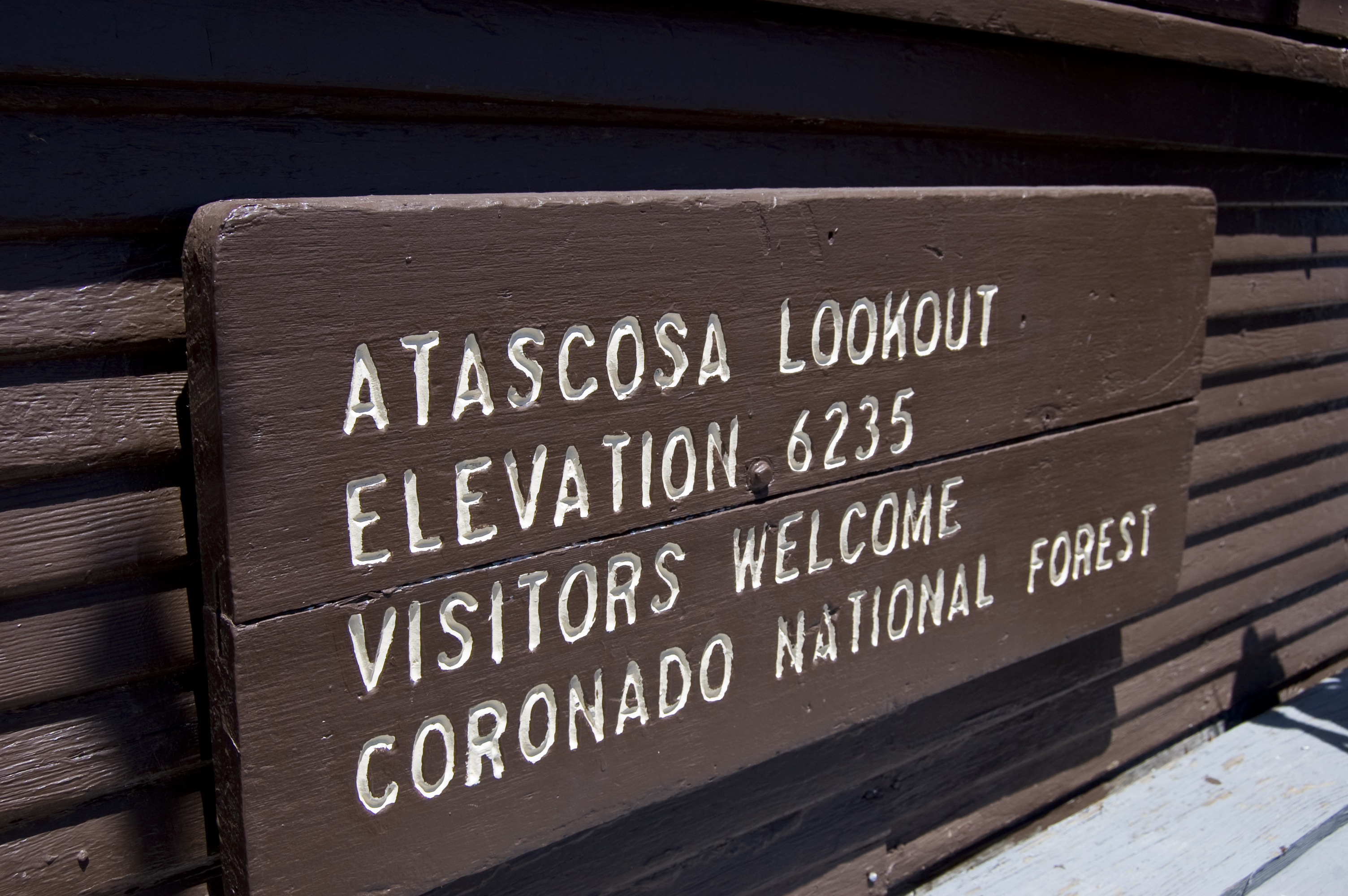

- Location within the United States
- 31.420680°N 111.146708°W
- Location: Tubac, Santa Cruz County, Arizona, US

History
- Built: 1930-1933

Site notes
- Area: 60 by 60 feet (18 m × 18 m)

Atascosa Lookout House was a groundhouse and fire lookout in the Coronado National Forest in Arizona, United States. It was constructed between 1930 and 1933, and was destroyed in a fire on June 6, 2011. The structure was designated as a National Historic Lookout on December 30, 1996, and was added to the National Register of Historic Places in 1988. The lookout house had dimensions of 14 by 14 feet (4.3 by 4.3 meters) and was situated at an elevation of 6,235 feet (1,900 m). It had a custom hip roof with a 2-foot (0.61 m) overhang and included gutters for a cistern. The house was located at N 31.420680° W 111.146708° and was enclosed by a square boundary measuring 60 by 60 feet (18 by 18 m).
