= Castro Peak Lookout =

Destroyed Fire Lookout Tower & Cab

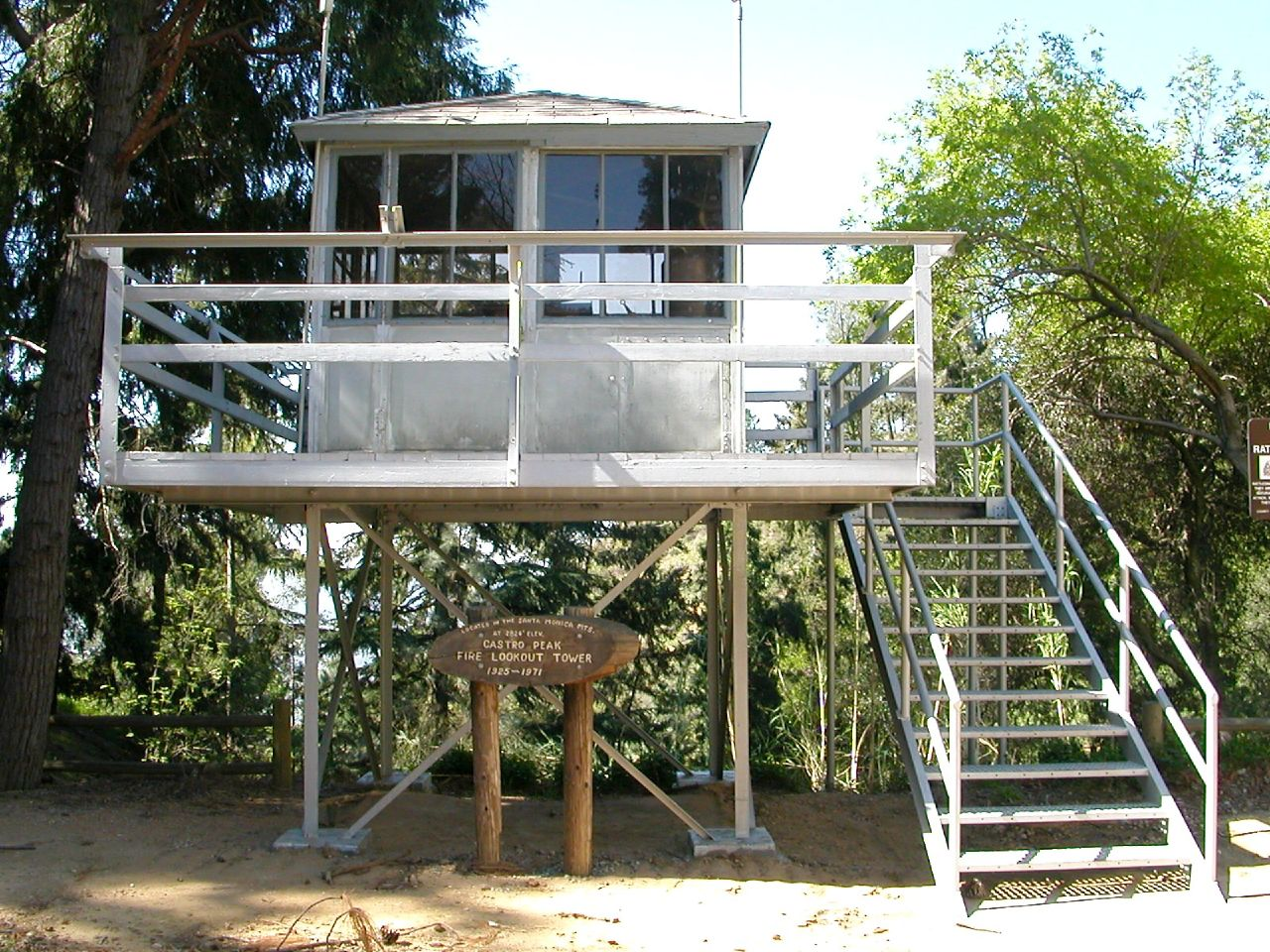

- Location within the United States
- 34.192611°N 118.089184°W
- Location: Henninger Flats Forestry Unit, Los Angeles County, California, USA

History
- Built: 1925

Site notes
- Architect: Los Angeles County Forestry Department

Castro Peak Lookout was a California Fire lookout Tower & cab built on Castro Peak. It was built in 1925, and went out of service in 1971. In 1978, it was moved to L.A. County Fire Department’s Henninger Flats Forestry Unit. There, it served as a historical artifact and educational piece. It was dismantled in 2025 by the L.A. County Fire Department, with the intent being to later place it on the Los Angeles County Fairgrounds. It was registered as a national historic lookout on December 8, 2018. The cab possessed dimensions of 8 by 8 feet (2.4 m × 2.4 m), and the tower possessed dimensions of 22 by 22 feet (6.7 m × 6.7 m). It stood at an elevation of 2,554 feet (778 m) above sea level.
