= Monte Vista Lookout Cabin =

- U.S. National Register of Historic Places
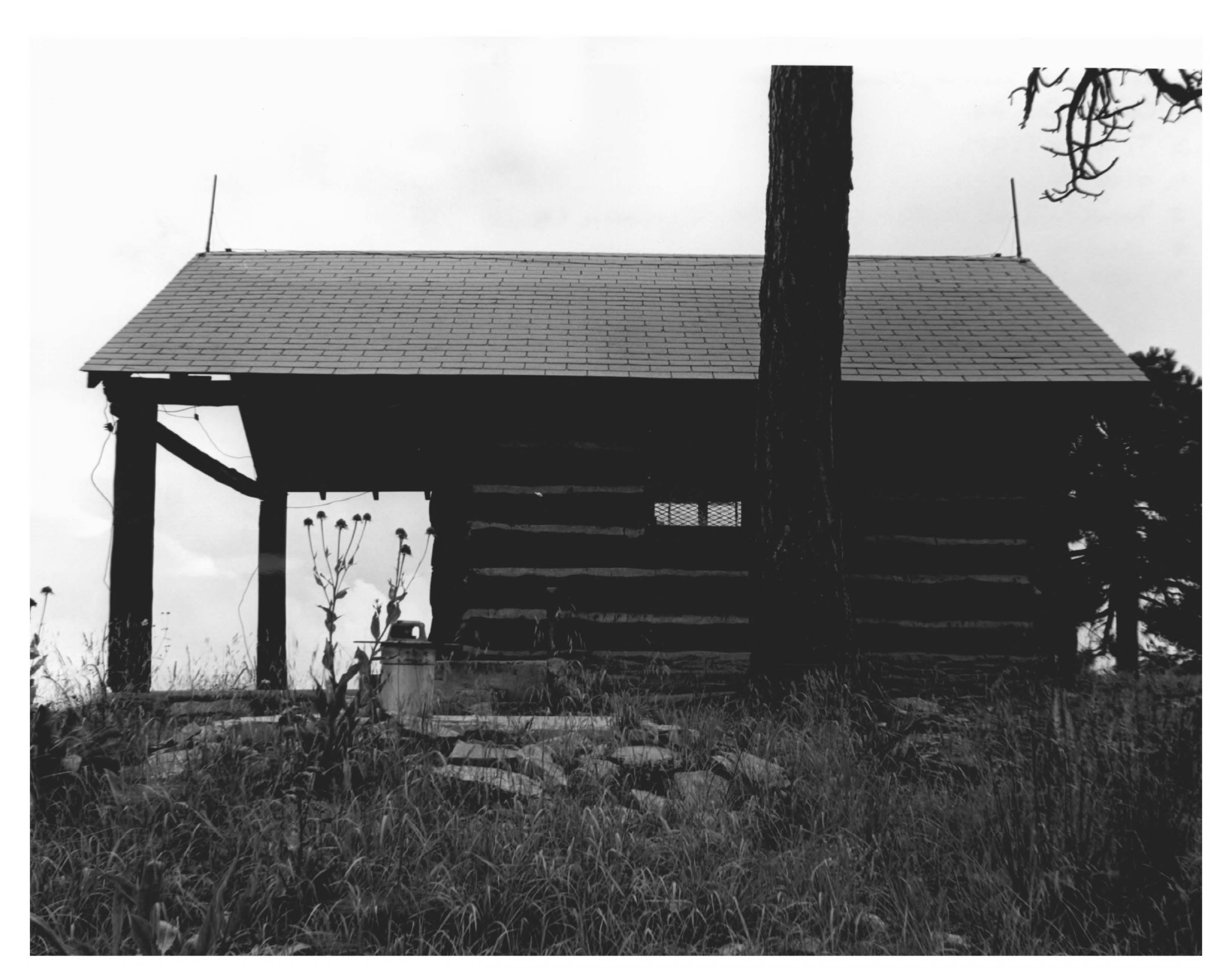

- Location within Arizona Location within the United States
- Location: Monte Vista Peak, Chiricahua Mountains, near Elfrida, Arizona
- Coordinates: 31°49′30″N 109°18′53″W
- Area: less than one acre
- Built: 1933
- Built by: CCC
- MPS: National Forest Fire Lookouts in the Southwestern Region TR
- NRHP reference No.: 87002468
- Added to NRHP: January 28, 1988

Monte Vista Lookout Cabin is a structure in Cochise County, Arizona, that is on the National Register of Historic Places. The cabin sits at the base of the Lookout, in the southern portion of the Chiricahua Mountains in the Coronado National Forest. In 1956, it was erroneously reported that the cabin had been destroyed during a forest fire. The structure was also threatened by fire in 2011 during the Horseshoe II Fire.

It was built by the Civilian Conservation Corps.

Photos in 1986 show that it is a log cabin with chinking between its logs, with a front porch, and with fire tower behind.
