= Huckleberry Mountain Fire Lookout =

- U.S. National Register of Historic Places
- Location within Wyoming Location within the United States
- Nearest city: Teton National Forest, Wyoming
- Coordinates: 44°4′57″N 110°35′50″W
- Built: 1938
- Architect: U.S. Forest Service; Civilian Conservation Corps
- NRHP reference No.: 83003365
- Added to NRHP: July 08, 1983

The Huckleberry Mountain Fire Overlook is a fire lookout station in northern Bridger–Teton National Forest. The rustic two-story log structure was built in 1938 by the Civilian Conservation Corps to a standard U.S. Forest Service design. The lookout was used for fire surveillance until 1957.
