= Udell Lookout Tower =

- U.S. National Register of Historic Places
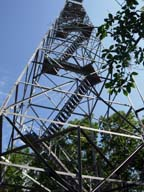

- Location within Michigan Location within the United States
- Interactive map
- Location: Forest Rd. 5207, Huron-Manistee National Forests, Wellston, Michigan
- Coordinates: 44°12′29″N 86°5′59″W
- Area: less than one acre
- Built: 1936
- NRHP reference No.: 95001013
- Added to NRHP: August 22, 1996

The Udell Lookout Tower is a fire lookout tower located on Forest Road 5207 in the Manistee section of the Huron-Manistee National Forests, near Wellston, Michigan. It was placed on the National Register of Historic Places in 1996.

== History ==
The Manistee National Forest was created (as the Manistee Purchase unit) in 1933. In 1936, a fire control plan for the area was designed and implemented. Part of that plan was the construction of Udell Lookout Tower. Soon after a residence and garage were constructed near the tower; these buildings were moved about ten years later. Udell Tower remained a primary fire lookout tower until the 1960s, when aerial observation flights became more common. Many other lookout towers were abandoned at the same time, and were eventually destroyed or demolished. The Udell Lookout Tower is the last standing example of this type of tower in the Huron-Manistee National Forests.

== Description ==
The Udell Lookout Tower is a 100 foot tall prefabricated steel frame tower, constructed from galvanized steel angles bolted together, located atop a hill. The foundation is made of four reinforced concrete pedestals. An enclosed hipped roof observation cab made from galvanized sheet steel is located on top of the tower. The cab has a wooden floor and windows on all sides. A small prefabricated metal building is currently located immediately adjacent to one corner of the tower.

== Gallery ==
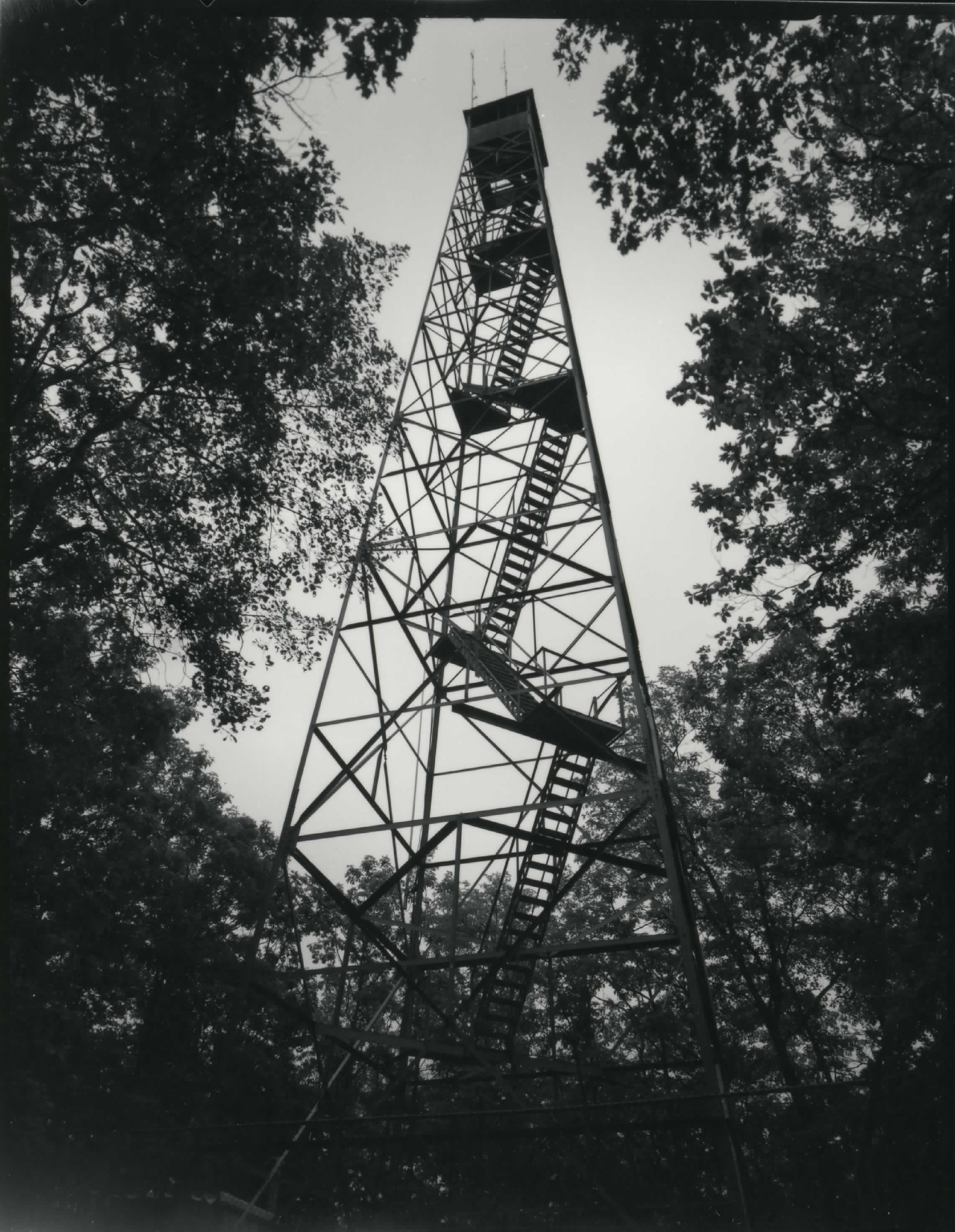
