= Ripley Fire Lookout Tower =

- U.S. National Register of Historic Places
- Location within Tennessee
- Location: Joe Crihfield Rd., Ripley, Tennessee
- Coordinates: 35.849769°N 89.517651°W
- Built: c.1970
- NRHP reference No.: 100004684
- Added to NRHP: March 9, 2020

The Ripley Fire Lookout Tower, on Joe Crihfield Rd. in Ripley, Tennessee, was listed on the National Register of Historic Places in 2020.

It was built around 1970 for the Tennessee Division of Forestry.

It is also known as Edith tower.
