= Kirkland Lookout Ground House (Guard Station) =

- U.S. National Register of Historic Places
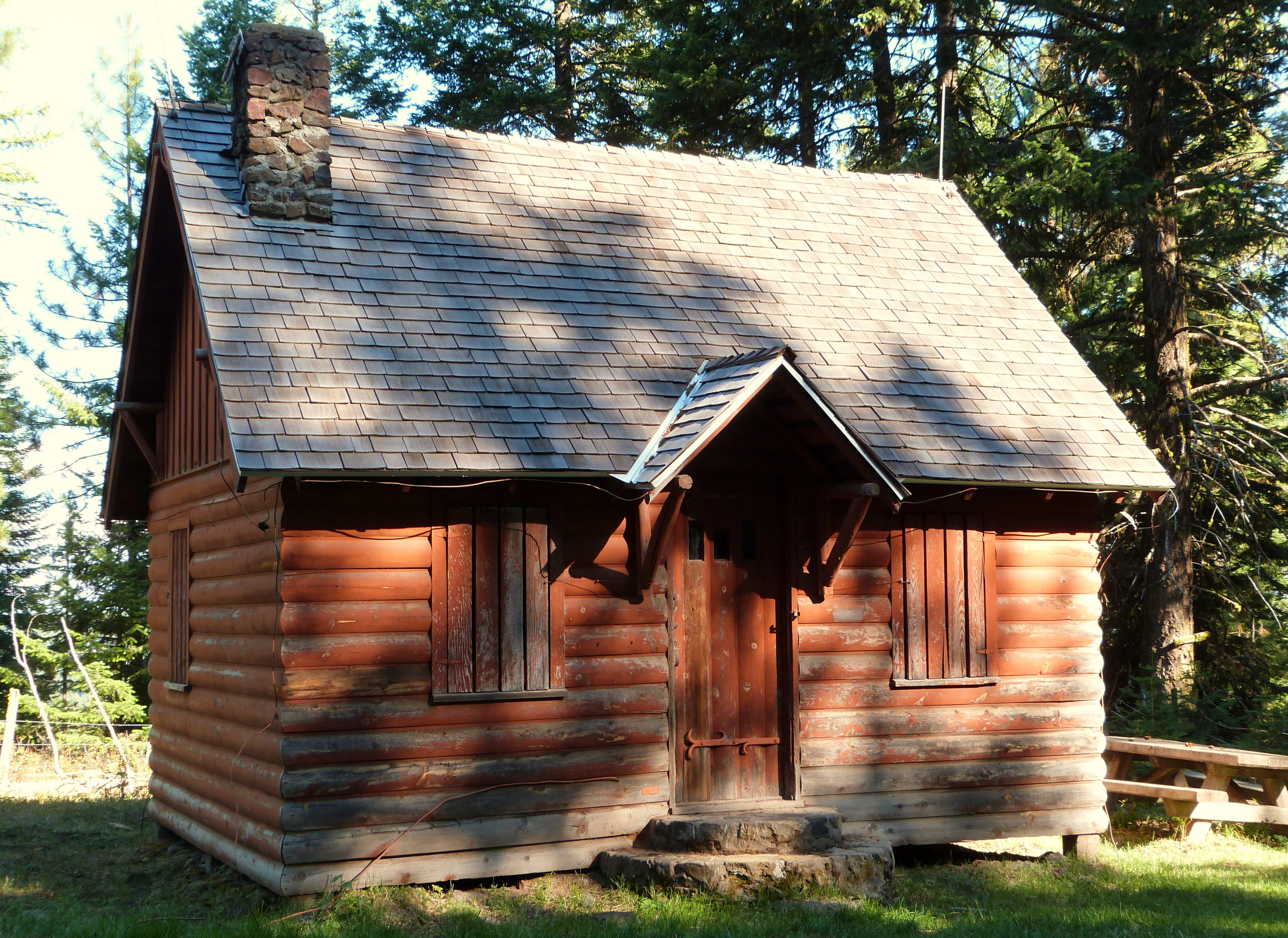
- The Kirkland Lookout Ground House in 2013.

- Location within Oregon Location within the United States
- Location: East of Joseph Creek in the Wallowa–Whitman National Forest
- Nearest city: Joseph, Oregon
- Coordinates: 45°50′15″N 117°07′59″W
- Area: 0.5 acres (0.20 ha)
- Built: 1936
- Architect: Multiple
- Architectural style: Rustic architecture of USDA
- MPS: USDA Forest Service Administrative Buildings in Oregon and Washington Built by the CCC MPS
- NRHP reference No.: 91000165
- Added to NRHP: March 6, 1991

The Kirkland Lookout Ground House (Guard Station), located east of Joseph Creek in the Wallowa–Whitman National Forest near Joseph, Oregon, United States, was built in 1936. It was listed on the National Register of Historic Places in 1991.
