= McCart Fire Lookout =

- U.S. National Register of Historic Places
- Location within Montana Location within the United States
- Nearest city: Sula, Montana
- Coordinates: 45°53′05″N 113°43′00″W
- Area: 3 acres (1.2 ha)
- Built: 1939
- Engineer: Clyde Fickes
- Architectural style: L-4 Fire Lookout
- NRHP reference No.: 96000660
- Added to NRHP: June 19, 1996

The McCart Fire Lookout, near Sula, Montana, was built in 1939. It was listed on the National Register of Historic Places in 1996.

It is an L-4 Fire Lookout, located at 7,115 feet (2,169 m) elevation, about 4 miles (6.4 km) south of the East Fork Forest Service Station in Bitterroot National Forest.

It was named for Bill McCart, a longtime National Forest Service employee in the East Fork District (now Sula District).
