= Moore Lookout Tower =

- U.S. National Register of Historic Places
- Location within Mississippi Location within the United States
- Location in Mississippi
- Location: Scott County Road 503, Forest, Mississippi
- Coordinates: 32.4040°N 89.4670°W
- Built: 1940
- Architect: Civilian Conservation Corps
- Architectural style: No Style
- NRHP reference No.: 99001283
- Added to NRHP: October 28, 1999

The Moore Lookout Tower is a historic fire lookout tower located on Scott County Road 503 in Forest, Scott County, Mississippi. Built in 1940 by the Civilian Conservation Corps (CCC), the tower is a rare example of its type and has been listed on the National Register of Historic Places.

== History ==
The Moore Lookout Tower was constructed in 1940 as part of the early development of the National Forests in Mississippi during the 1930s and 1940s. It was built by the Civilian Conservation Corps, a key New Deal program that provided jobs and developed infrastructure during the Great Depression. The tower is named for its location in the Bienville National Forest.

== Design ==
The tower stands at 100 feet tall and features a distinctive design where the staircase wraps around the exterior of the steel frame, unlike other fire towers with internal stairs. The lookout cab at the top is constructed from wood, with weatherboard siding and a wood-shingled hipped roof. The cab includes a deck surrounded by chain-link fencing for safety and has one-over-one double-hung metal frame windows.

== Significance ==
The Moore Lookout Tower is the only known example of its specific type in Mississippi, making it a unique and valuable historical structure. It is significant both locally and statewide under Criterion C of the National Register of Historic Places criteria for its unique architectural characteristics and its role in forest conservation efforts during the early 20th century. The tower is recognized for its significance in the area of architecture during the period of 1925–1949.

== Associated structures ==
At the base of the tower is a nonhistoric, one-story concrete block radio hut with a flat roof, which does not contribute to the historical significance of the tower.
