= Swiftcurrent Fire Lookout =

- U.S. National Register of Historic Places
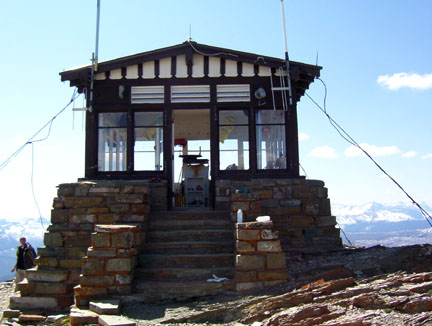

- Location within Montana Location within the United States
- Nearest city: West Glacier, Montana
- Coordinates: 48°47′8″N 113°45′58″W
- Built: 1936
- Architectural style: Swiss Chalet Revival
- MPS: Glacier National Park MRA
- NRHP reference No.: 86003694
- Added to NRHP: December 16, 1986

The Swiftcurrent Fire Lookout in Glacier National Park is significant as one of a chain of staffed fire lookout posts within the park. The low two-story timber-construction structure with a gabled roof was built in 1936. Its detailing is reminiscent of the Swiss Chalet style of the nearby Many Glacier Hotel. The design is modified from standard U.S. Forest Service plans. The Swiftcurrent lookout was listed on the National Register of Historic Places in 1986, and it is also listed on the National Historic Lookout Register.
