= Carrisa Lookout Complex =

- U.S. National Register of Historic Places
- Location within New Mexico
- Nearest city: Long Canyon, New Mexico
- Coordinates: 32°40′34″N 105°37′09″W
- Area: less than one acre
- Built: 1934
- MPS: National Forest Fire Lookouts in the Southwestern Region TR
- NRHP reference No.: 87002488
- Added to NRHP: January 28, 1988

The Carrisa Lookout Complex, in Lincoln National Forest in or near Long Canyon, New Mexico Long Canyon was built in 1934. It was listed on the National Register of Historic Places in 1988.

The listing included two contributing buildings and a contributing structure.

photos only
