= Bearwallow Mountain Lookout Cabins and Shed =

- U.S. National Register of Historic Places
- NM State Register of Cultural Properties
- Location within New Mexico Location within the United States
- Location: Bearwallow Lookout Rd., Gila National Forest, Bearwallow Park, New Mexico
- Coordinates: 33°26′57″N 108°40′3″W
- Area: 1.8 acres (0.73 ha)
- Built: 1923
- MPS: National Forest Fire Lookouts in the Southwestern Region TR
- NRHP reference No.: 87002473
- NMSRCP No.: 1441

Significant dates
- Added to NRHP: January 28, 1988
- Designated NMSRCP: March 4, 1988

The Bearwallow Mountain Lookout Cabins and Shed are located in the Bearwallow Park near Mogollon, New Mexico. Built in 1940 by the Works Progress Administration, they are one of three New Deal-era buildings in the Gila National Forest, which also include the El Caso Lookout Complex and the Mangas Mountain Lookout Complex. In 2006 the buildings were threatened by the Bear Fire, which burned across Bearwallow Mountain.

== See also ==
- National Register of Historic Places in Catron County, New Mexico
