= El Caso Lookout Complex =

- U.S. National Register of Historic Places
- NM State Register of Cultural Properties
- Location within New Mexico Location within the United States
- Location: Gila National Forest, El Caso Lake, New Mexico
- Coordinates: 34°6′11″N 108°29′39″W
- Area: less than one acre
- Built: 1934
- MPS: National Forest Fire Lookouts in the Southwestern Region TR
- NRHP reference No.: 87002476
- NMSRCP No.: 1444

Significant dates
- Added to NRHP: January 28, 1988
- Designated NMSRCP: March 4, 1988

The El Caso Lookout Complex is located in the Gila National Forest north of Apache Creek, New Mexico. Built in 1934 by the Works Progress Administration, the complex was one of three New Deal-era forest fire lookouts built in Catron County. The other two are the Mangas Mountain Lookout Complex near Old Horse Springs and the Bearwallow Mountain Lookout Complex near Mogollon.

== See also ==
- National Register of Historic Places listings in Catron County, New Mexico
