= Bluewater Lookout Complex =

- U.S. National Register of Historic Places
- Location within New Mexico
- Nearest city: Weed, New Mexico
- Coordinates: 32°44′28″N 105°27′54″W
- Area: less than one acre
- Built: 1917, 1937
- MPS: National Forest Fire Lookouts in the Southwestern Region TR
- NRHP reference No.: 87002486
- Added to NRHP: January 28, 1988

The Bluewater Lookout Complex, in Otero County, New Mexico near Weed, New Mexico was established in 1937. It was listed on the National Register of Historic Places in 1988. The listing included a contributing structure and two contributing buildings.

It consists of a 45-foot-tall (14 m) fire lookout tower and associated buildings in Lincoln National Forest in Otero County, New Mexico. The tower has a 7 by 7 feet (2.1 m × 2.1 m) steel cab and is either an Aermotor LX-E4 model or an International Derrick Company tower. The two buildings are a wood-frame cabin and a storage shed, built in 1937.

It seems that the tower was built in 1917 for the United States Weather Bureau and was purchased and moved to its current site by the Forest Service in 1937.

The complex was added to the National Register of Historic Places on January 28, 1988, as part of a thematic group of United States Forest Service fire lookouts in the forest service's Southwestern Region.
