= Clay Butte Lookout =

- U.S. National Register of Historic Places
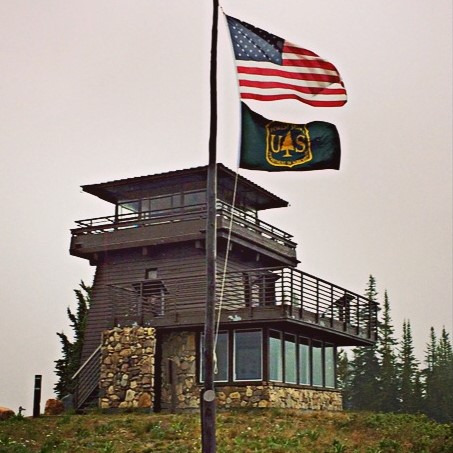

- Location within Wyoming Location within the United States
- Location: Approx. 1/2 mi. N. of jct. of US 212 and FS Rd. 142, Park County, Wyoming
- Nearest city: Clark, Wyoming
- Coordinates: 44.944392°N 109.626573°W
- Area: 2.5 acres (1.0 ha)
- Built: 1941-1943
- NRHP reference No.: 13001065
- Added to NRHP: January 8, 2014

The Clay Butte Lookout is a forest fire lookout in Park County, Wyoming. It was listed on the National Register of Historic Places in 2014.

It is located in the northern Absaroka Range in the Shoshone National Forest about sixteen miles east of Yellowstone National Park and about four miles south of the Wyoming-Montana state border. It is about one half mile north of U.S. Highway 212, at the end of FS Rd. 142 which winds up to it.

Its construction was started in 1941 within the Civilian Conservation Corps program, but the CCC was closed before it was completed in 1943. It is a three-story wood-sided structure built out of eight inch by eight inch beams. It is 26.25 feet (8.00 m) tall.

It is near Clark, Wyoming.
