= Glorieta Baldy Lookout Tower =

- U.S. National Register of Historic Places
- Location within New Mexico
- Nearest city: La Cueva, Santa Fe County, New Mexico
- Coordinates: 35°39′00″N 105°47′57″W
- Area: less than one acre
- Built: 1940
- MPS: National Forest Fire Lookouts in the Southwestern Region TR
- NRHP reference No.: 87002492
- Added to NRHP: January 27, 1988

The Glorieta Baldy Lookout Tower, in Santa Fe National Forest near La Cueva, Santa Fe County, New Mexico, was built in 1940. It was listed on the National Register of Historic Places in 1988.

As of Sep 2017, the tower is in disrepair, but there are plans to fund restoration work and place it the Santa Fe National Forest cabin rental program.” The restoration is to be funded by non-profit Friends of the Santa Fe National Forest.
