= Kendrick Lookout Tower and Cabin =

NRHP site in Coconino County, Arizona

- Location: Coconino County, Arizona
- Coordinates: 35°24′29″N 111°50′47″W
- Built: 1911

The Kendrick Lookout Tower is a fire lookout in Arizona's Kaibab National Forest overlooking the Kendrick Mountain Wilderness and areas around Humphrey's Peak and Flagstaff. According to the Forest Service website, "When the lookout tower is open during summer months, the lookout operator usually welcomes visitors to visit the top of the tower to enjoy the views." However, the lookout tower appears to be damaged and likely abandoned as of June 2024.

The Kendrick Lookout Cabin was built in 1911 and first used as a fire lookout in 1912. The cabin has been listed on the National Register of Historic Places since January 28, 1988. During both the Pumpkin Fire (2000) and the Boundary Fire (2017), the cabin was wrapped in a protective material to protect it. According to a sign near the Kendrick Peak Trail, "Both the historic cabin and lookout tower survived, but fire burned the cabin ruins along the Pumpkin Trail."
