= Hornet Lookout =

Fire lookout tower in Montana

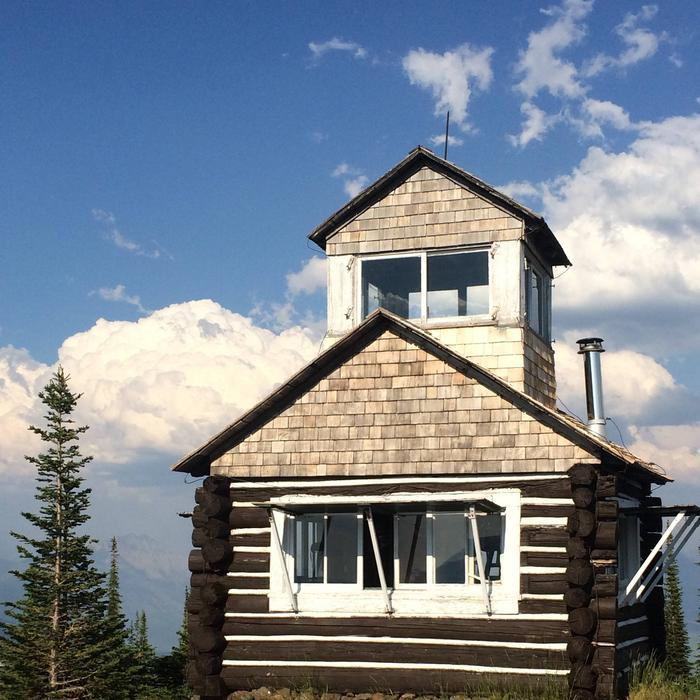
Hornet Lookout

Hornet Lookout is a former fire lookout tower located in the Flathead National Forest and is located approximately 45 miles (72 km) north of Columbia Falls, Montana. On August 19, 1983, Hornet Lookout was added to the National Register of Historic Places.

== History ==
Hornet Lookout was constructed between 1922 and 1923 as a response to the great fire of 1910. It served as a part of the chain of lookouts providing forest fire detection in the North Fork area of the Flathead National Forest. The lookout was staffed each summer from 1923 until approximately 1946. Hornet Lookout represents a relatively short-lived architectural style of fire lookouts designed, constructed, and used in the US Forest Service Region 1. Hornet Lookout was constructed by US Forest Service seasonal employees at a cost of $719.38. All materials were either available on the site or were packed in by trail.

== Specifications ==
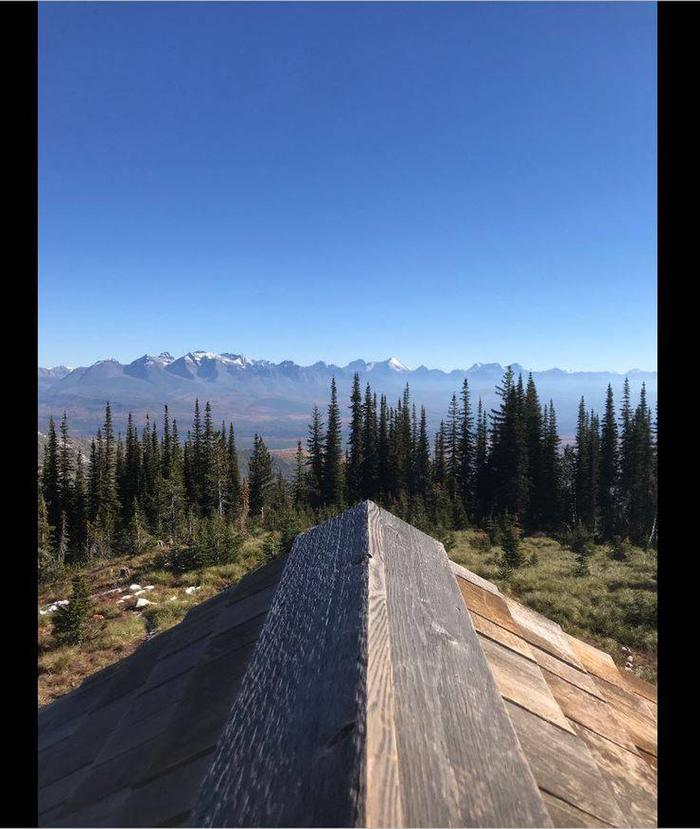
View from Hornet Lookout

Hornet Lookout is a D-l style US Forest Service fire lookout tower situated on the summit of Hornet Mountain. The building is a 14' by 14' single room log cabin. The cabin is made of 8-10 inch logs which are saddlenotched at the corners. The interior of the structure contains built-in storage containers, a wood burning stove, two bed frames and a hand crafted chair. The words "Hornet L.O." are spelled out in white painted rocks. The letters are approximately 4 ft. high and are located approximately 75 ft. to the east of Hornet Lookout.

== Modern use ==
Hornet Lookout is available to rent from mid-June to October annually. The cost to rent the lookout is $40 per night.
