= Forest Fire Lookout Association =

Organization dedicated to first fire lookout stations and their restoration

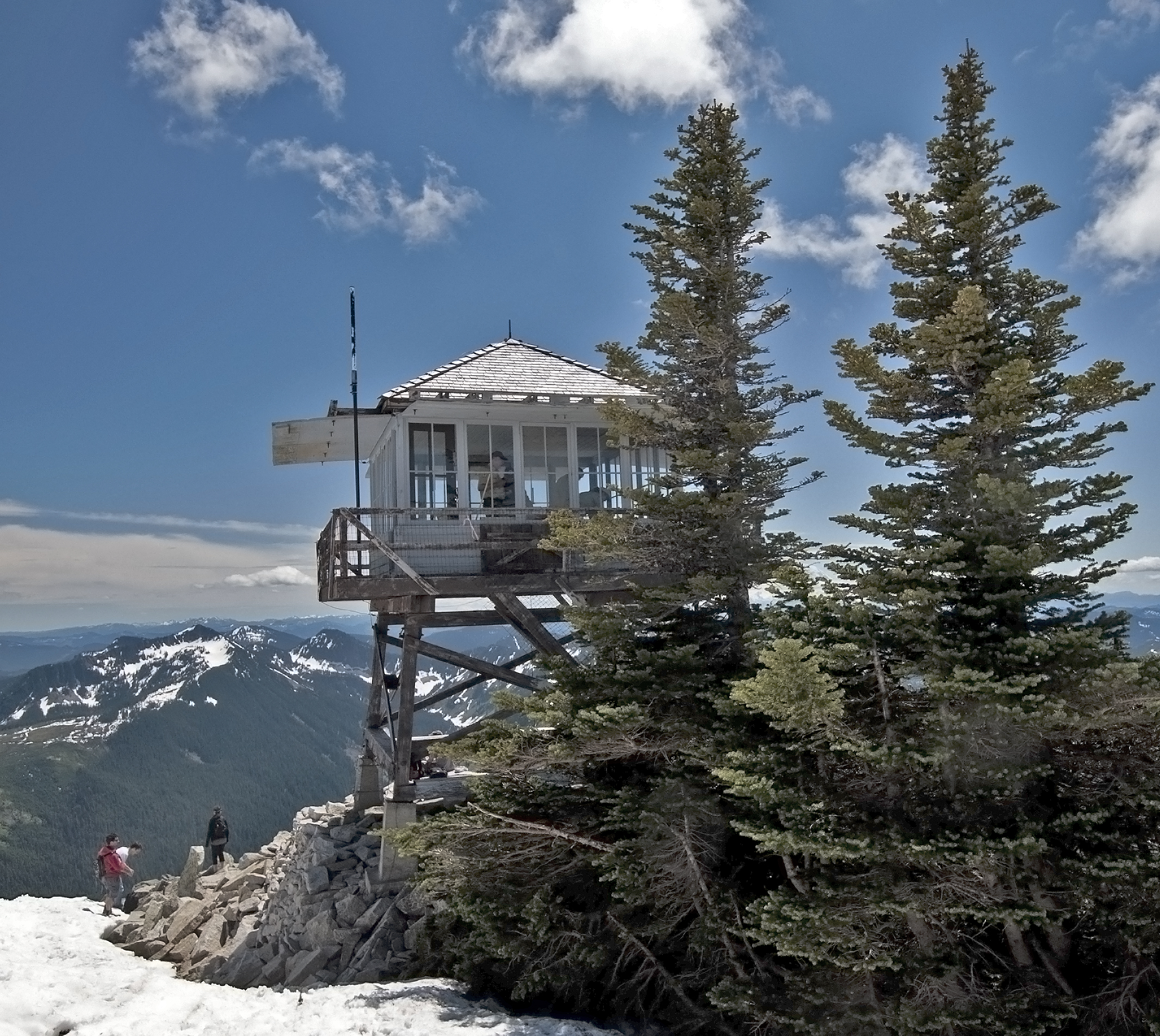
Granite Mountain Lookout, Washington state, USA

The Forest Fire Lookout Association (FFLA) is a group dedicated to the worldwide research and restoration of forest fire lookout stations. The organization provides volunteer led fire detection service at selected sites.

It is one of the administrators of the National Historic Lookout Register and the Former Fire Lookout Sites Register.

== History ==
The group was formed in 1990 at French Creek State Park in Pennsylvania by people from seven northeastern states.

As of 2022, the FFLA has nearly 1400 members, with representatives and directors in nearly every US State, Canada, and Australia. The association has active partnerships with the U.S. Forest Service and many other groups to restore and preserve the heritage of fire lookouts that are active or have been in the past. The organization forms local chapters to provide volunteer led fire detection service at some lookout sites.

The board of directors represent members throughout the U.S., Canada and Australia. The executive committee of chairman, secretary, treasurer, archivist/historian, eastern deputy chair, southern deputy chair and western deputy chair conduct an annual meeting each January.

The FFLA publishes a quarterly magazine, Lookout Network. The organization hosts at least two or more conferences a year at different locations throughout the United States and Canada. The Australian chapter hosts its own annual meeting at the ending of their fire season.
