= Barfoot Lookout Complex =

- U.S. National Register of Historic Places
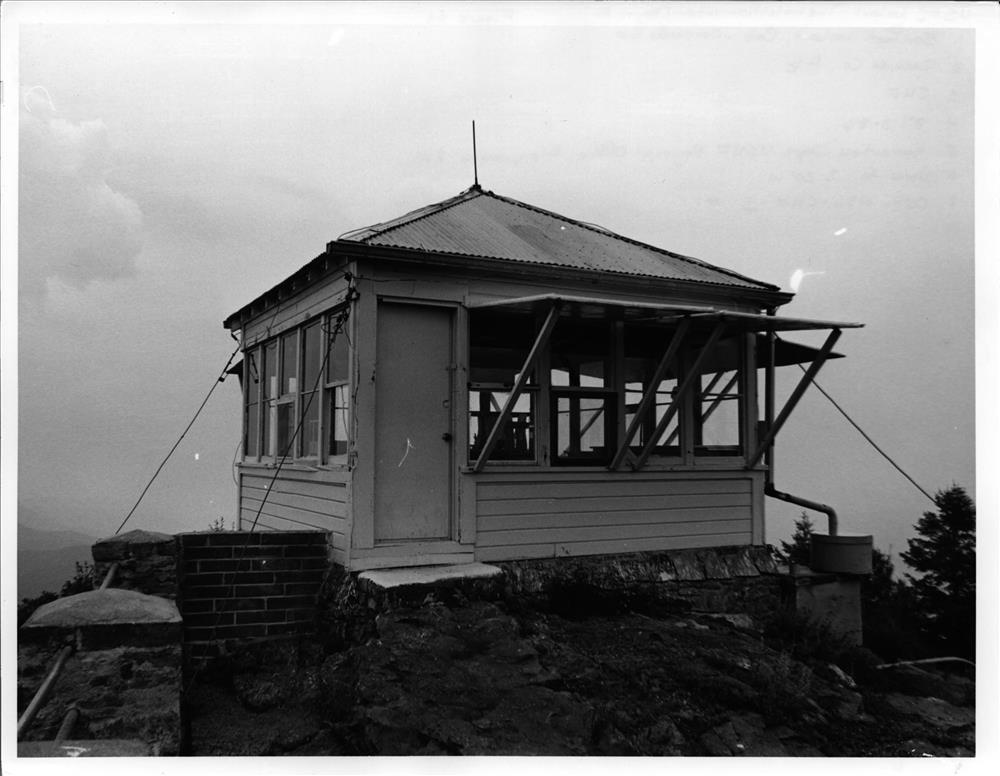

- Location within Arizona Location within the United States
- Location: Buena Vista Peak, Coronado National Forest
- Coordinates: 31°54′59″N 109°16′23″W
- Area: 6400 square feet
- NRHP reference No.: 87002463
- Added to NRHP: July 28, 1988

Barfoot Lookout Complex was a forest lookout situated on Buena Vista Peak in the Douglas Ranger District in the Chiricahua Mountains in Cochise County, Arizona. It was built in 1935. It is hypothesized to have been built by members of the Civilian Conservation Corps. The complex consisted of a 14 foot by 14 foot lookout house, shed, privy, concrete cistern, and a native stone retaining wall. When it was designated by the NHRP, none of the structures had received any modifications since they had been built. The complex was approximately 80 feet by 80 feet, with the retaining wall along the west edge of the boundary.

The structure was destroyed in the Horseshoe 2 Fire in 2011.
