= Look See Tree =

- U.S. National Register of Historic Places
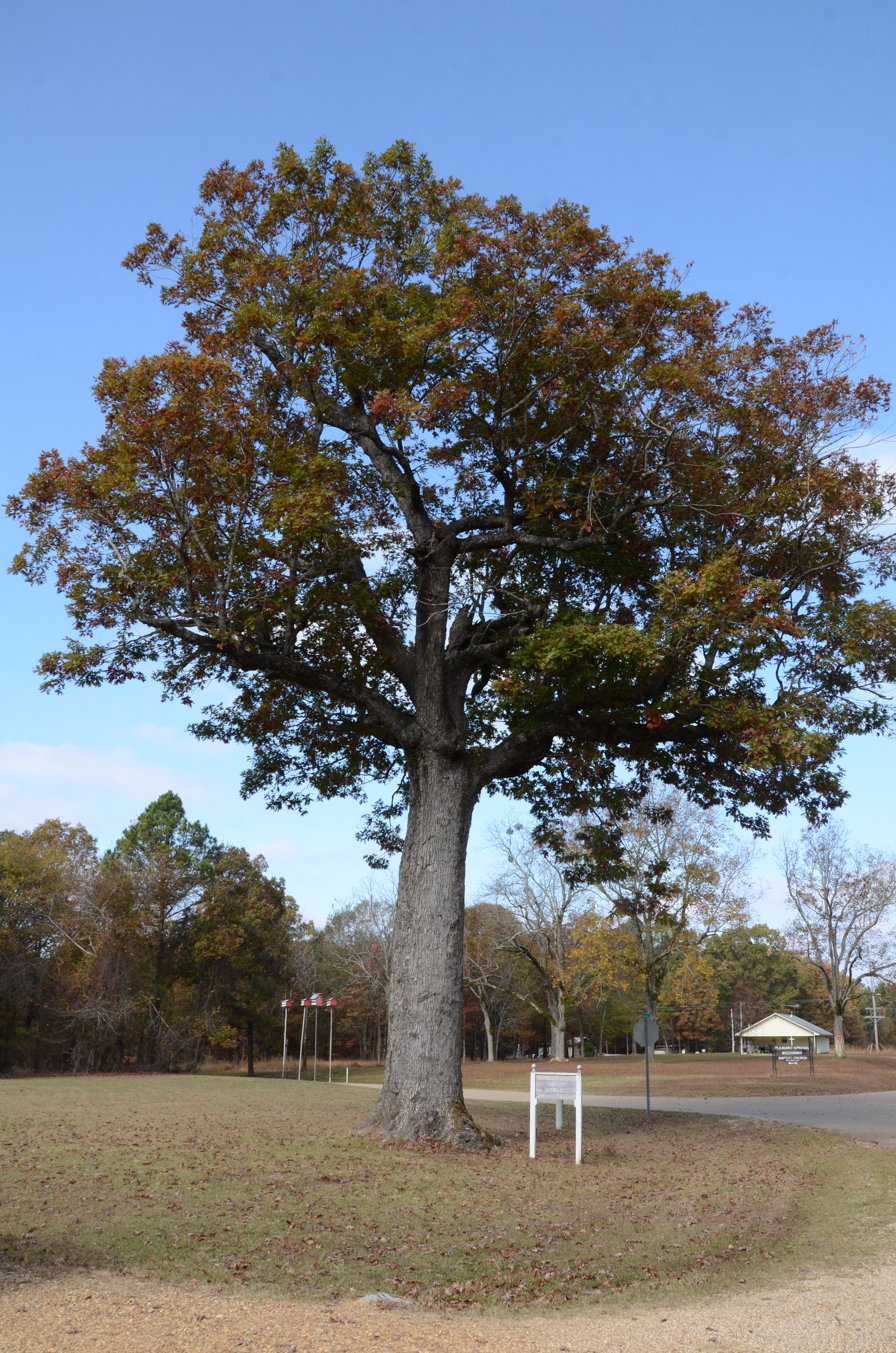

- Location within Arkansas Location within the United States
- Nearest city: Coleman, Arkansas
- Coordinates: 33°47′10″N 91°44′59″W
- Area: less than one acre
- NRHP reference No.: 07001427
- Added to NRHP: January 23, 2008

Look See Tree is a lookout tree located at the southwest corner of Arkansas Highway 83 and Pleasant Springs Road in Coleman, Arkansas. The tree was used as a fire lookout for roughly ten to fifteen years from c. 1930 to c. 1940. As the tree was the tallest tree in what was at the time an open area, it provided an inexpensive lookout for Arkansas Forestry Commission rangers. The tree was fitted with climbing pegs, a platform, and a telephone line which connected to a ranger station. A fire tower eventually assumed the tree's function, but the pegs and platform were left in the tree. The Look See Tree was, as of 2006, the only remaining lookout tree in Arkansas.

The Look See Tree was added to the National Register of Historic Places on January 23, 2008.

== See also ==
- National Register of Historic Places listings in Drew County, Arkansas
