= Coleman, Arkansas =

Unincorporated community in Arkansas, United States

- Unincorporated community
- Location within Arkansas Location within the United States
- Coordinates: 33°46′28″N 91°44′56″W
- Country: United States
- State: Arkansas
- County: Drew
- Elevation: 299 ft (91 m)
- Time zone: UTC-6 (Central (CST))
  - Summer (DST): UTC-5 (CDT)
- Area code: 870
- GNIS feature ID: 56966

Coleman is an unincorporated community in Drew County, Arkansas, United States. Coleman is located at the junction of Arkansas Highway 83 and Arkansas Highway 277, 10.3 miles (16.6 km) north-northeast of Monticello. The Look See Tree, a lookout tree listed on the National Register of Historic Places, is located in Coleman.
