= Osborne Fire Finder =

Line-of-sight device for locating fires

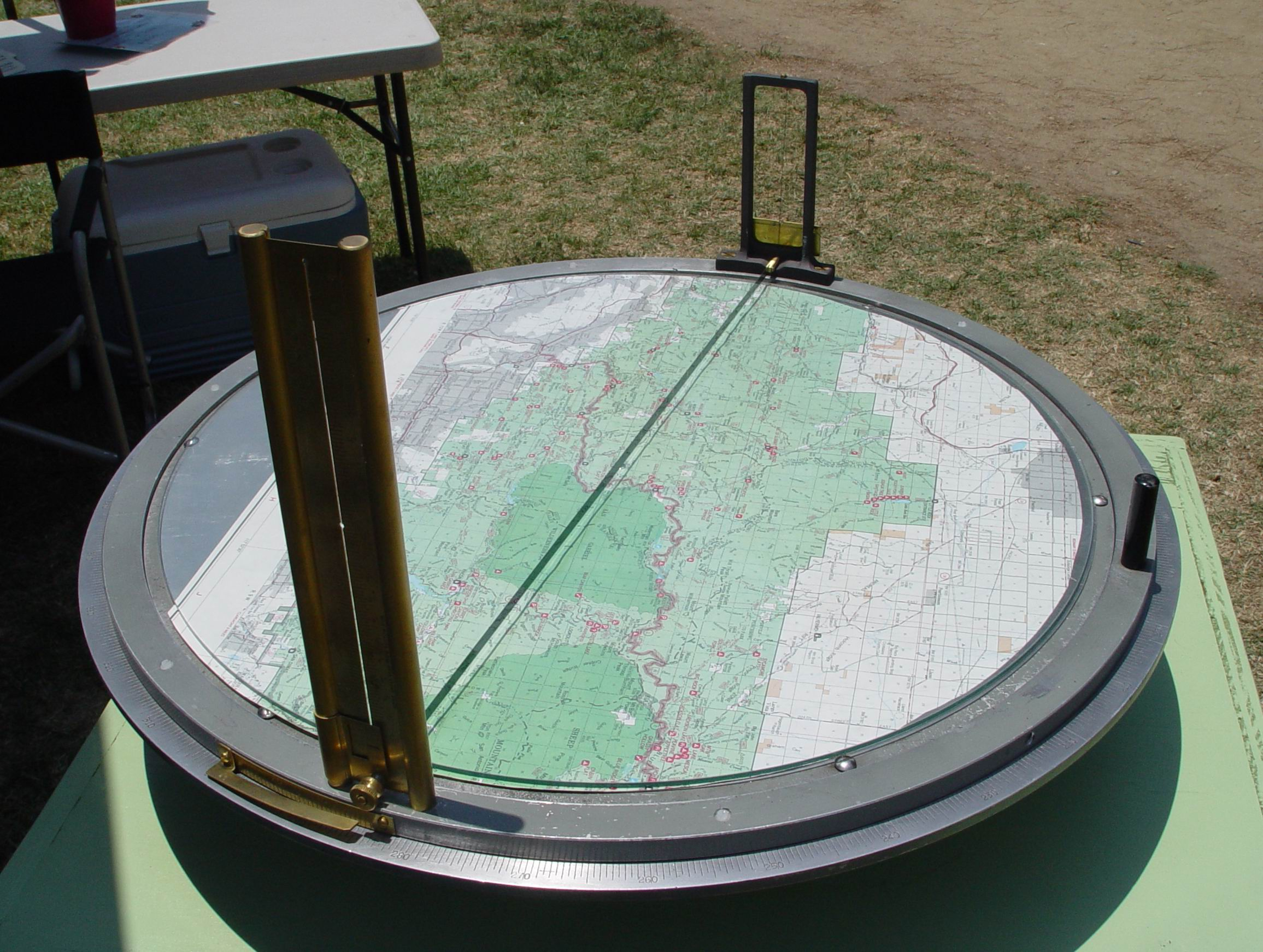
An Osborne Fire Finder device used in fire lookout towers.

The Osborne Fire Finder is a type of alidade used by fire lookouts to find a directional bearing (azimuth) to smoke in order to alert fire crews to a wildland fire.

== History and development ==
The forerunner to the device was invented around 1840 by Sir Francis Ronalds to help combat fire in London – he also named his innovation the "Fire Finder". Ronalds's fire finder comprised a theodolite atop a watchtower. Bearings and vertical angles from the horizon to surrounding features were recorded either on a surrounding cylinder in the form of a panorama or on a circular table at the base of the instrument. The location of any fire could thus be pinpointed even in the dark.

The modern version was created by William "W. B." Osborne, a United States Forest Service employee from Portland, Oregon, and has been in service since 1915. Mr. Osborne also designed the photo-recording transit for making panoramic records of forest conditions, as well as a collapsible water-bag knapsack for firefighting (patented in the US in 1935). Many fire finders were manufactured from 1920 through 1935, but the manufacturer, Leupold & Stevens, Inc., stopped production of replacement parts after 1975.

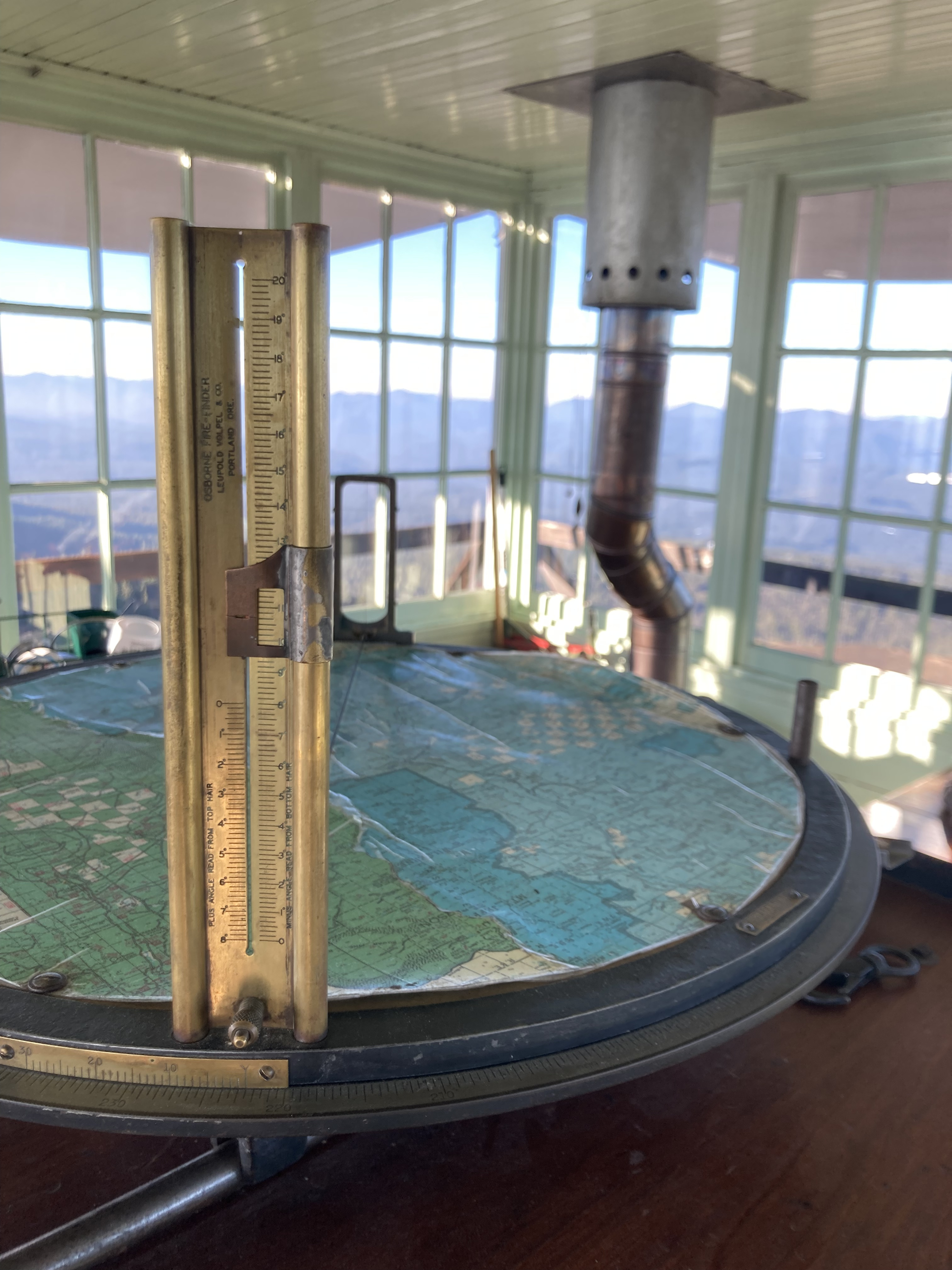
Osborne Fire Finder at Sand Mountain Lookout, Oregon

== Use ==
The system is composed of a topographic map of the area oriented and centered on a horizontal plane table with a circular rim graduated in degrees (and fractions). Two sighting apertures are mounted above the map on opposite sides of the ring and slide around the arc.

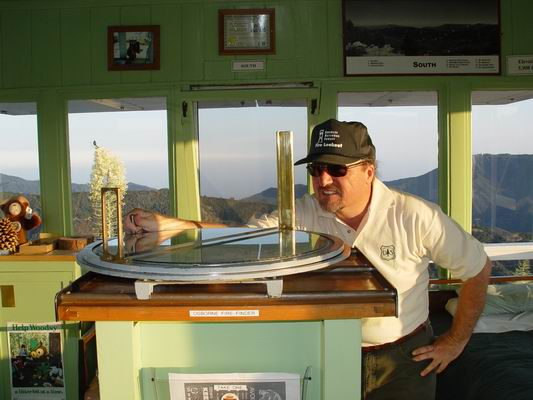
A USFS Fire Lookout using an Osborne Firefinder while on duty at Vetter Mountain, California.

The device is used by moving the sights until the observer can peek through the nearer sighting hole and view the cross hairs in the further sight aligned with the fire. The fire lookout notes the degrees on the graduated ring beneath the sight. Early Fire Finders were capable of a crude estimate of elevation based upon the level and elevation of the table, calculating distance and rough position of the fire by reference to any distinctive terrain features and by use of the scale shown on the map. However, in actual practice, fire distance and location were normally established using two or more Fire Finder-equipped lookout towers, using the intersection method to fix the precise location of the fire. Dispatchers at a central facility used a compass rose to mark lines of position from each reporting tower onto a large map to quickly find where the reported bearings intersect.

Today, a more precise determination of a fire location can be made by the use of a single Fire Finder in conjunction with a digital elevation model (DEM).
