= National Historic Lookout Register =

Listing by the US Forest Service

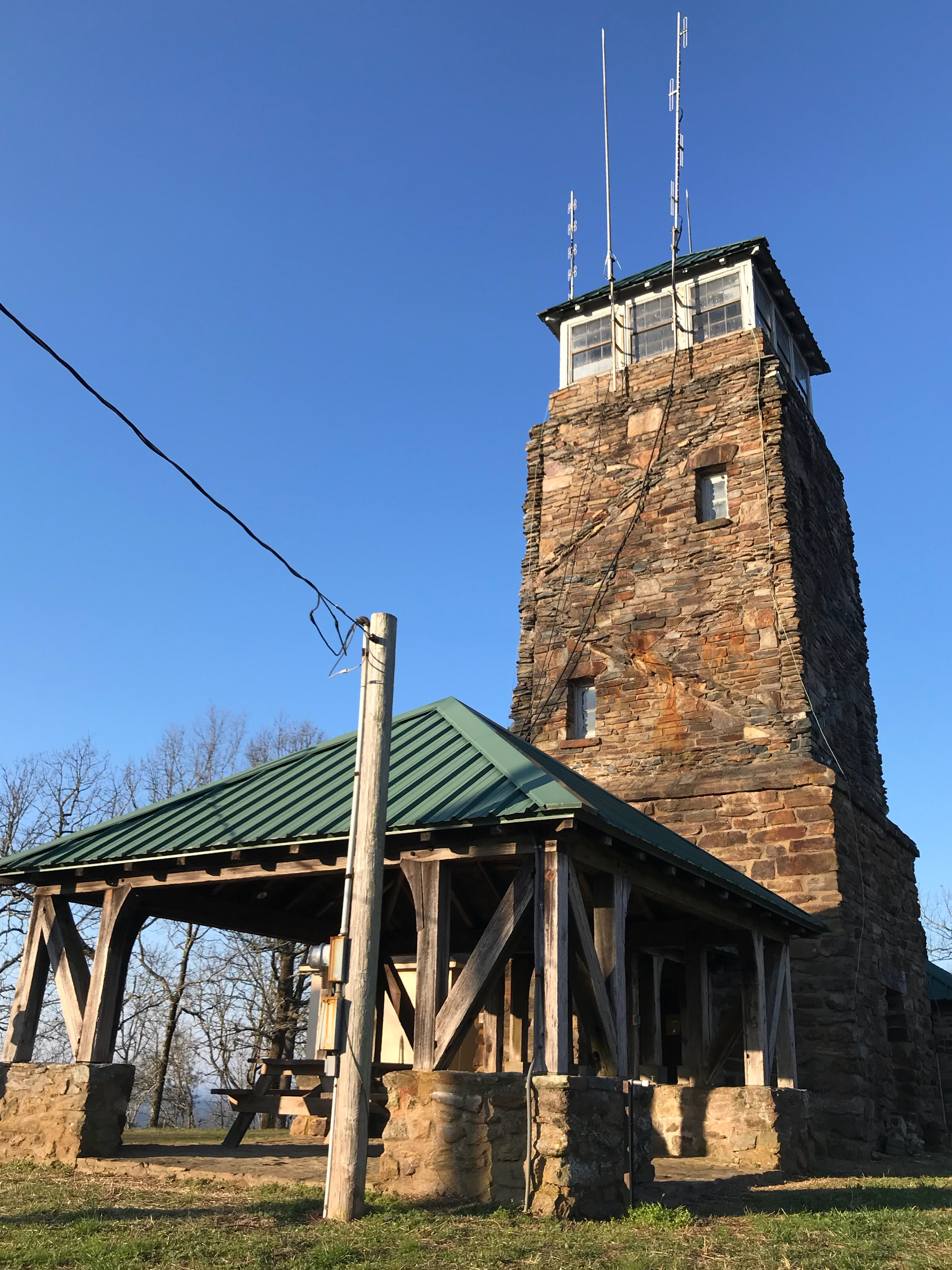
Flag Mountain Lookout Tower

Established in 1990, the National Historic Lookout Register is a program administered by the United States Forest Service, the Forest Fire Lookout Association, the National Woodland Owners Association, the National Forestry Association, state forestry departments and Department of Interior agencies to recognize historic fire lookout towers in the United States.

== Background ==
The register is a cooperative effort between private non-profits, federal agencies and state forestry departments "to identify historic lookout towers that have played an important role in forest conservation."

== Listings on the register ==
Fire lookout towers
Lookout Name	Registry Number	Location	Information	Photo	Listing
Big Hole Lookout	US 781, MT 45	Lolo National Forest 47.09°N 114.27°E	14'x14' (196 ft²) Grange-Hall type lookout built in 1930.		http://nhlr.org/lookouts/us/mt/big-hole-lookout/
Church Creek Forestry Tower	US 696, MD 3	Church Creek, Maryland (Church Creek Forestry station)	The 100' tower is a 120 feet (37 m) Aermotor tower with 7 by 7 feet (2.1 by 2.1 m) metal cab with a rooftop catwalk; constructed by the Maryland Forest Service in 1932.	No Photo	nhlr.org/lookouts/us/md/church-creek-forestry-tower
Hopi Point Lookout	US 802, AZ 67	Grand Canyon National Park; 36.07627°N 112.15431°W	The first Hopi Lookout on this site in the Grand Canyon National Park was a tree-top crow's nest in 1909.		nhlr.org/lookouts/us/az/hopi-lookout
Kanabownitz Lookout	US 803, AZ 68	Grand Canyon National Park; 36.29068°N 112.21175°W	Built in 1940	No Photo	nhlr.org/lookouts/us/az/kanabownitz-lookout
North Rim Lookout	US 804, AZ 69	Grand Canyon National Park; 36.33059°N 112.10168°W	Built in 1928	No Photo	nhlr.org/lookouts/us/az/north-rim-lookout
Signal Hill Lookout	US 805, AZ 70	Grand Canyon National Park; 36.17008°N 112.35807°W	Built in 1929		nhlr.org/lookouts/us/az/signal-hill-lookout/
Slide Mountain Lookout	US 1045, CA 100	Dome Mountain (Los Angeles County)	The Slide Mountain Lookout, located above Pyramid Lake off Interstate 5, was built in 1969 as part of the Pyramid Reservoir project. It was restored by ANFFLA and operational since 2003. This lookout is open all year long, and hearty volunteers are needed, as it is a 3-hour uphill hike to the lookout.		nhlr.org/lookouts/us/ca/slide-mountain-lookout
William Penn Memorial Fire Tower	US 324, PA 7	2500 Skyline Drive, Lower Alsace Township, Berks County, Pennsylvania	Built in 1939 by the City of Reading as a tourist attraction and fire observation post and staffed by the Pennsylvania Bureau of Forestry until 1988, William Penn Memorial Fire Tower is one of the most impressive lookouts in the U.S. This 120' stone tower with round copper dome cab replaced a wooden tower dating to 1889 which had burned in 1923. The City of Reading and Pagoda-Skyline, Inc. have restored the tower.		nhlr.org/lookouts/us/pa/william-penn-memorial-fire-tower

== See also ==
- List of fire lookout towers
