= National Register of Historic Places listings in Lewis County, Idaho =

Location of Lewis County in Idaho

This is a list of the National Register of Historic Places listings in Lewis County, Idaho.

This is intended to be a complete list of the properties and districts on the National Register of Historic Places in Lewis County, Idaho, United States. Latitude and longitude coordinates are provided for many National Register properties and districts; these locations may be seen together in a map.

There are 4 properties and districts listed on the National Register in the county. More may be added; properties and districts nationwide are added to the Register weekly.

This National Park Service list is complete through NPS recent listings posted May 23, 2025.

== Current listings ==
| | Name on the Register | Image | Date listed | Location | City or town | Description |
|---|---|---|---|---|---|---|
| 1 | James F. Bridwell House | James F. Bridwell House | April 6, 1989 (#88001446) | 107 5th St. 46°13′37″N 116°01′44″W | Kamiah | |
| 2 | Lower Salmon River Archeological District | Lower Salmon River Archeological District | September 4, 1986 (#86002170) | Address Restricted | Winchester | Extends into Idaho and Nez Perce counties |
| 3 | St. Joseph's Mission | St. Joseph's Mission | June 24, 1976 (#76000677) | South of Culdesac off U.S. Route 95; 46°18′53″N 116°42′37″W | Culdesac | |
| 4 | State Bank of Kamiah | State Bank of Kamiah | August 29, 1978 (#78001082) | State Highway 64; 46°13′38″N 116°01′40″W | Kamiah | |

== See also ==
- List of National Historic Landmarks in Idaho
- National Register of Historic Places listings in Idaho
