= North Central Idaho =

Region of Idaho, USA

Coordinates: 46°00′N 115°30′W

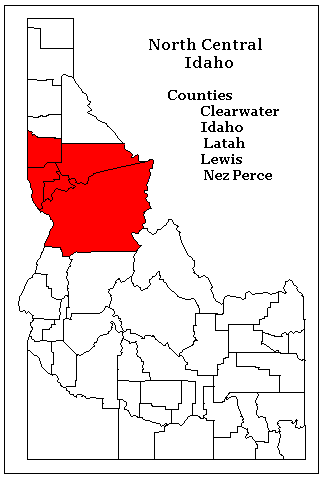

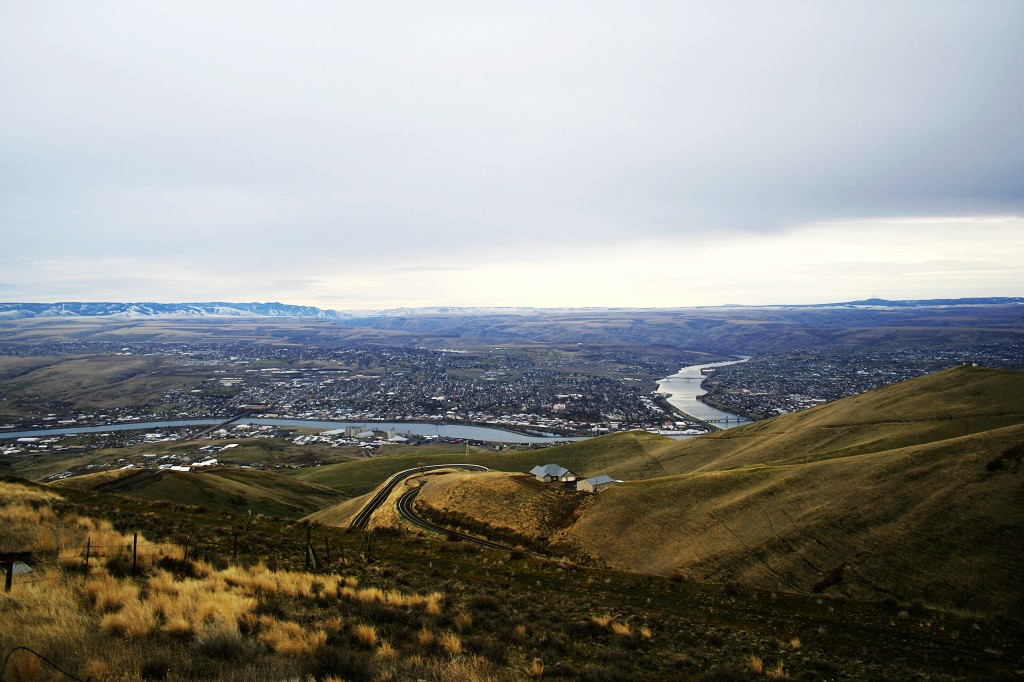
Lewiston and Clarkston, WA from the north, (old grade in foreground)

North Central Idaho is an area which spans the central part of the state of Idaho and borders Oregon, Montana, and Washington. It is the southern half of the state's Panhandle region and is rich in agriculture and natural resources. Lewis and Clark traveled through this area on their journey to the Pacific Ocean in September 1805, crossing Lolo Pass and continuing westward in canoes on the Clearwater River. They returned the following spring on their way eastward.

The primary cities are Lewiston and Moscow, home of the University of Idaho; both are on the region's western edge, near the Washington border.

== Geography ==
North Central Idaho consists of the following counties:

- Clearwater
- Idaho
- Latah
- Lewis
- Nez Perce

With the exception of the southern portion of Idaho County, this region observes Pacific Time.
South of the western-flowing Salmon River, Idaho observes Mountain Time, beginning at Riggins.

== Primary cities ==
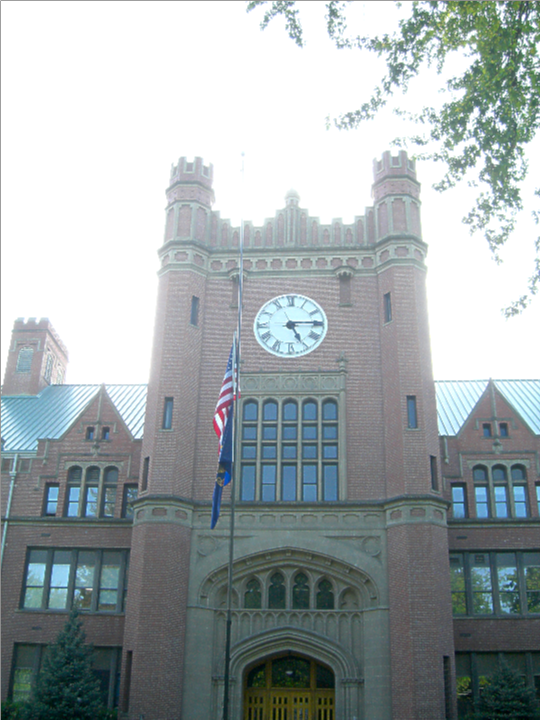
University of Idaho's Administration Building (1909) in Moscow

- Lewiston: inland port on the Snake River, first capital of Idaho Territory in 1863.
- Moscow: home of the University of Idaho, established in 1889.

== Highways ==
=== Federal ===
- - US-12 - west to Walla Walla, east to Missoula
- - US-95 - north to Coeur d'Alene, south to southwestern Idaho
- - US-195 - north to Pullman and Spokane

=== State ===
- - SH-3
- - SH-6
- - SH-7
- - SH-8
- - SH-9
- - SH-11
- - SH-13
- - SH-14
- - SH-62
- - SH-64
- - SH-99
- - SH-162

== Attractions ==
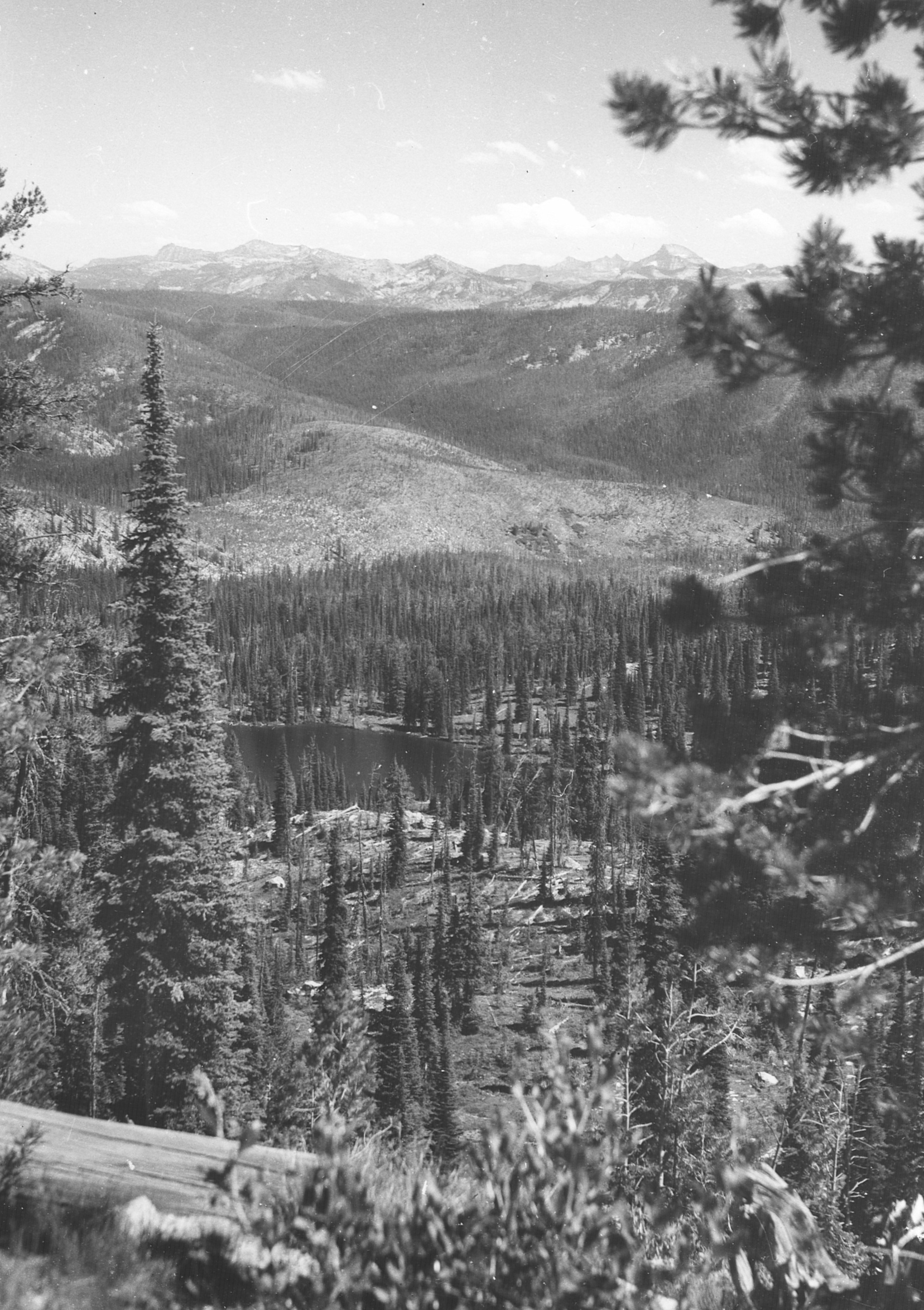
Selway-Bitterroot Wilderness

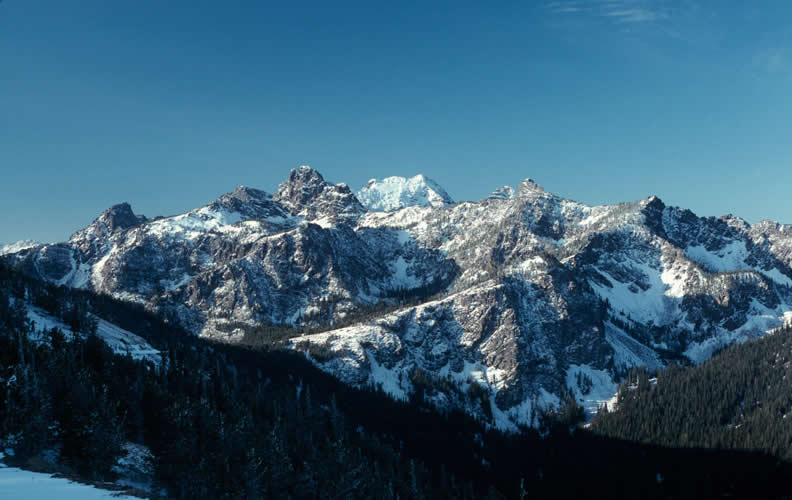
Seven Devils Mountains, southwest of Riggins

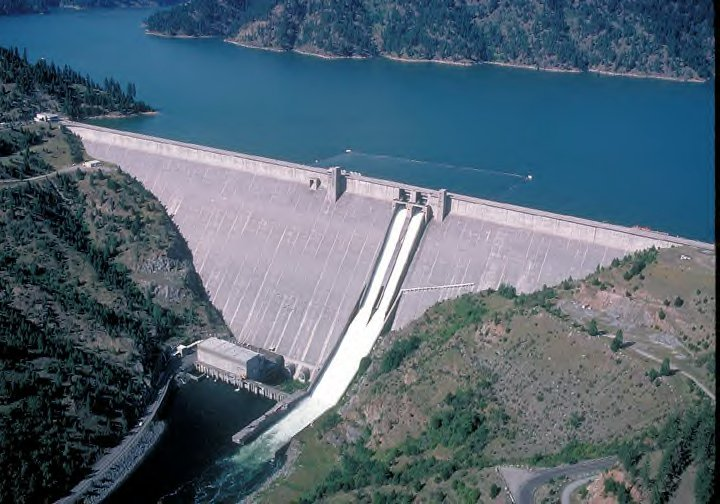
Dworshak Dam and Reservoir, northwest of Orofino

Attraction	City
Appaloosa Horse Museum	Moscow
Camas Prairie Railroad	Grangeville
Dworshak Dam and Fish Hatchery	Orofino
Frank Church-River of No Return Wilderness Area	Riggins
Gospel Hump Wilderness Area	Elk City
Hells Canyon National Recreation Area	Riggins
Historical Museum at St. Gertrude	Cottonwood
Lewis and Clark National Historic Trail	Kooskia
Nez Perce National Historical Park	Spalding
Palouse Region	Moscow
Salmon River Canyon Area	Riggins
Selway-Bitterroot Wilderness Area	Lowell
Seven Devils Mountains	Riggins
University of Idaho	Moscow
White Bird Battlefield	White Bird
Wolf Education and Research Center	Winchester

== Lakes ==
- Dworshak Reservoir – North Fork of Clearwater River

== Rivers ==
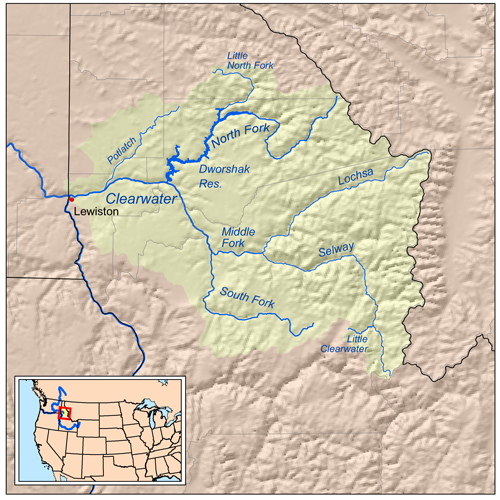
Clearwater River drainage in north central Idaho

- Clearwater
  - Lochsa
  - Selway
- Palouse
- Salmon
- Snake

== Forests ==
- Clearwater National Forest
- Nez Perce National Forest
- Payette National Forest

== Parks ==
- McCroskey State Park
- Nez Perce National Historical Park
- Dworshak State Park
- Hells Gate State Park
- Winchester State Park
