= Idaho State Highway 7 =

State highway in Idaho, United States

State Highway 7
- SH-7 highlighted in red

Route information
- Maintained by ITD
- Length: 16.559 mi (26.649 km)

Major junctions
- South end: Russell Ridge Road at Lewis-Clearwater county line near Orofino
- US 12 near Orofino
- North end: Old State Highway 7 in Ahsahka

Location
- Country: United States
- State: Idaho
- Counties: Clearwater

Highway system
- Idaho State Highway System; Interstate; US; State
← SH-6	→ SH-8

State Highway 7 (SH-7) is a state highway in Clearwater County, Idaho, United Staters, running from the Lewis County line through Orofino. It is 16.5 miles (26.6 km) long and runs north–south.

== Route description ==
SH-7 begins at the Clearwater-Lewis county line between Nezperce and Orofino. At one time, SH-7 continued south on Russell Ridge Road, SH-62 into Nezperce, SH-162 (before it turns east towards Kamiah), and Old SH-7 to U.S. Highway 95 (US-95) west of Grangeville. SH-7 continues north, briefly overlapping US-12 before crossing the Clearwater River into Orofino. It then runs through Orofino, continues north and ends on a bridge crossing the north fork of the Clearwater River. The road continues as Old State Highway 7 and Clearwater County P1.

== Major intersections ==
The entire route is in Clearwater County.

Location	mi	km	Destinations	Notes
	0.000	0.000	Russell Ridge Road south – Nezperce	Begin state maintenance at Lewis–Clearwater county line
Orofino	12.074	19.431	US 12 east – Kamiah	South end of US-12 overlap
Orofino	12.493	20.106	US 12 west – Lewiston	North end of US-12 overlap
Ahsahka	16.559	26.649	CR P1 (Cavendish Road / Old SH-7) / Northfork Drive / Ahsahka Road	End state maintenance
1.000 mi = 1.609 km; 1.000 km = 0.621 mi: Concurrency terminus

== See also ==
- List of state highways in Idaho
