= U.S. Route 12 in Idaho =

Section of U.S. Highway in Idaho, United States

U.S. Highway 12
- Lewis and Clark Highway; Northwest Passage Scenic Byway
- US 12 highlighted in red

Route information
- Maintained by ITD
- Length: 174.410 mi (280.686 km)
- Existed: 1962–present
- Tourist routes: Northwest Passage Scenic Byway

Major junctions
- West end: US 12 at Washington state line in Lewiston
- US 95 in Lewiston
- East end: US 12 at Montana state line at Lolo Pass

Location
- Country: United States
- State: Idaho
- Counties: Nez Perce, Clearwater, Lewis, Idaho

Highway system
- United States Numbered Highway System; List; Special; Divided; Idaho State Highway System; Interstate; US; State
← SH-11	→ SH-13

U.S. Route 12 (US-12) is a United States Numbered Highway in North Central Idaho. It extends 174.410 miles (280.686 km) from the Washington state line in Lewiston east to the Montana state line at Lolo Pass, generally along the route of the Lewis and Clark Expedition, and is known as the Northwest Passage Scenic Byway. It was previously known as the Lewis and Clark Highway.

== Route description ==
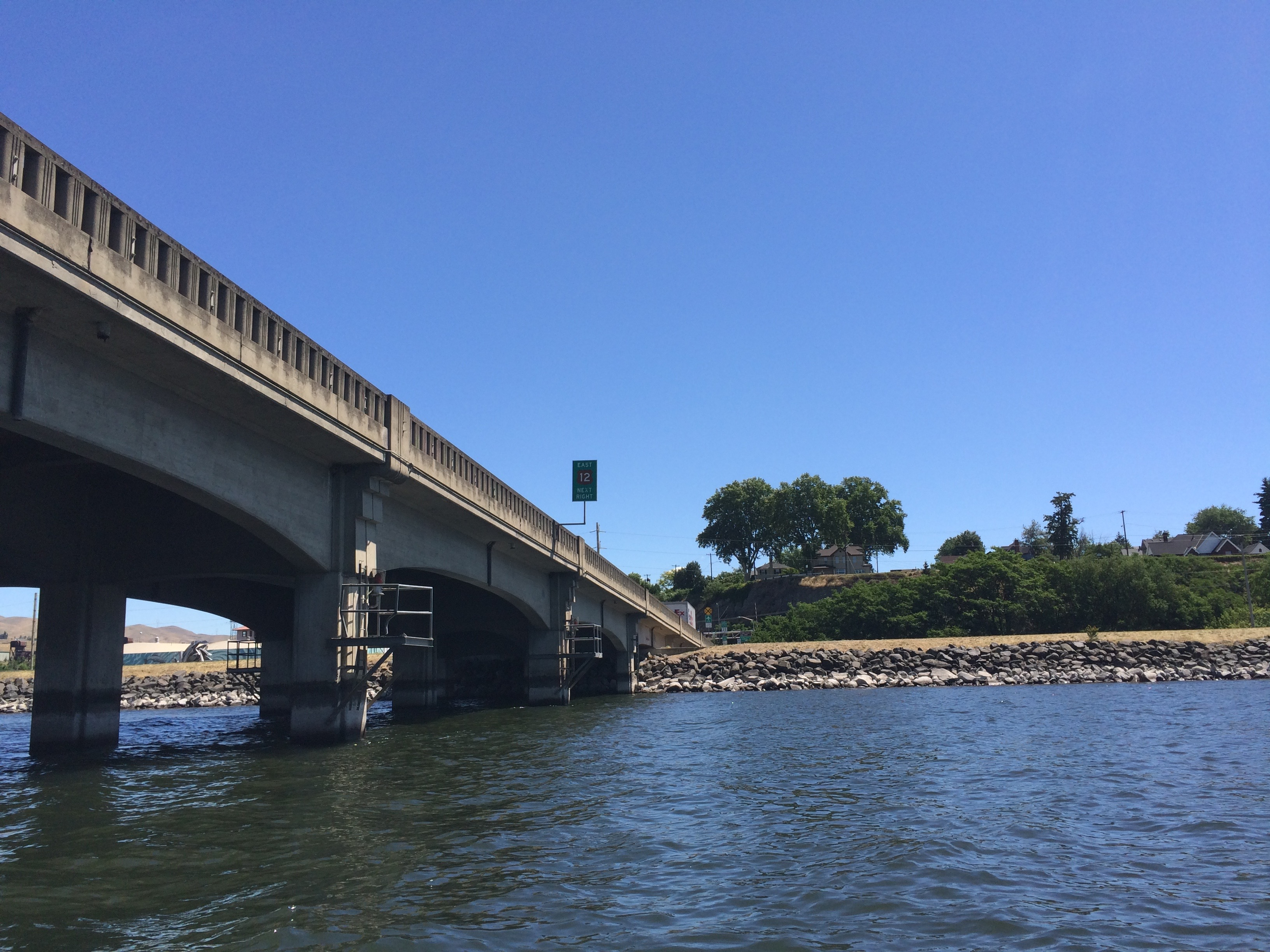
Eastbound US-12 entering Idaho at Lewiston, crossing the Snake River

US-12 enters Idaho at the Washington state line in Lewiston, Nez Perce County, crossing the Snake River at the state line. It heads east through Lewiston, turning north to cross the Clearwater River on the Clearwater Memorial Bridge. It then intersects State Highway 128 (SH-128) and turns east to overlap US-95 along a limited-access section with two lanes traveling each direction. The overlapped highways run east along the north bank of the Clearwater River for 7.3 miles (11.7 km), leaving Lewiston and entering the Nez Perce Indian Reservation before separating.

US-12 then continues east along the north bank of the Clearwater River through northern Lapwai, past the Ant and Yellowjacket rock formation and a historical marker for the Spalding Mission. It intersects SH-3 near Arrow and crosses the Clearwater River again.

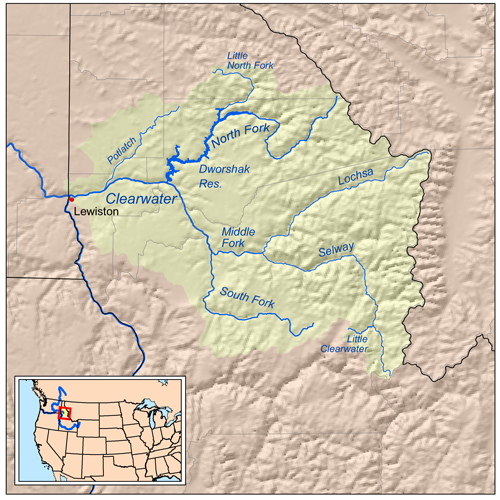
Clearwater River drainage in North Central Idaho

US-12 then continues east along the south bank of the Clearwater River past historical markers commemorating Indian houses and the ghost town of Slaterville, and, in a rest area at Lenore, a historical marker for the Lenore Tram.

Entering Clearwater County, US-12 continues east along the south bank of the Clearwater River through Orofino. Just after leaving Orofino, it briefly overlaps SH-7, then continues southeast along the south bank of the Clearwater River, past a historical marker for the point where Lewis and Clark first found a western-flowing river.

In Lewis County, US-12 continues southeast along the south bank of the Clearwater River, intersecting SH-11 at Greer and passing a historical marker for a ferry operated in the original 1860 goldrush. It then continues southeast into Kamiah, where it intersects SH-162. It then crosses the Clearwater River again and leaves Kamiah.

It then enters Idaho County and continues south along the north bank of the Clearwater River, crossing the Nez Perce National Historical Park. In the park, it passes a historical marker for two sites located about two miles (3.2 km) away, commemorating the Lewis and Clark Long Camp of 1806 and the Asa Smith mission of 1839 to 1841. It then continues south along the north bank of the Clearwater River, intersecting SH-13 across the river from Kooskia. The highway then turns east along the north bank of the Clearwater River, passing a historical marker commemorating the camp of Nez Perce led by Looking Glass, and the 1877 attack by the U.S. Army on July 1 that provoked Looking Glass to join the Nez Perce retreat with Chief Joseph. It continues east along the north bank of the Clearwater River, leaving the Nez Perce reservation. US-12 then continues to Lowell, where it turns northeast along the north bank of the Lochsa River through the Bitterroot Mountains.

US-12 passes historical markers for Whitehouse Pond, Lewis and Clark's crossing of the Lolo Trail in 1806, and their crossing of the Lolo Pass summit in 1805, before crossing Lolo Pass at 5,233 feet (1,595 m) to enter Montana. From there it descends past Lolo Hot Springs to Lolo, the junction with US-93, near the site of Lewis and Clark's Traveler's Rest.

== History ==
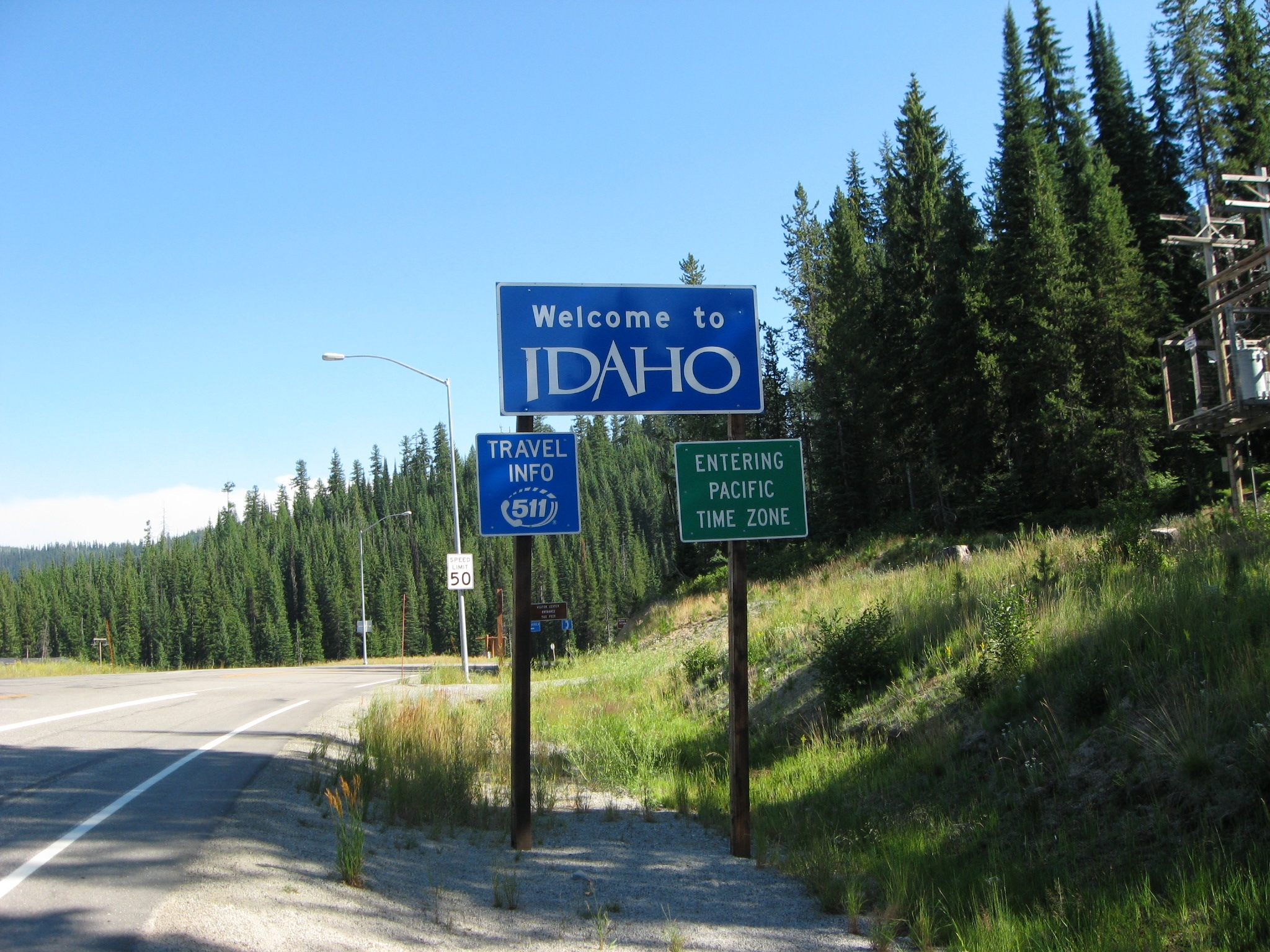
Lolo Pass in 2007, entering Idaho from Montana at 5,233 feet (1,595 m)

US-12 was created in 1925 as part of the original system of U.S. Highways, and its original western terminus was in Miles City, Montana. In 1962, the highway was extended west to Lewiston, ending at the former US-410. In 1967, it was extended to its current western terminus in Aberdeen, Washington, with the Idaho section taking its current route.

The Lewis and Clark Highway, from Lewiston eastward to Lolo Pass, was designated SH-9 in 1916 and construction began in 1920. Federal prison labor was used in the late 1930s to early 1940s, and Japanese internment labor was used during the last two years of World War II, working out of the Kooskia Internment Camp, six miles (9.7 km) upstream of Lowell, just below milepost 104.

By late 1955, 27 miles (43 km) remained unfinished, and, upon its completion in 1962, it was redesignated US 12. At the dedication ceremony at Lolo Pass attended by thousands on August 19, the states' governors, Robert E. Smylie of Idaho and Tim Babcock of Montana, cut through a ceremonial western redcedar log at Packers Meadow with a two-man crosscut saw.

The bridge crossing the Clearwater River near Arrow opened for traffic in early 1973. The route previously was on the river's south bank between the bridge and Spalding, where it crossed on the old Spalding bridge; damaged by ice jams 10 years earlier, it was dismantled shortly after the Arrow bridge opened.

The current SH-9 is entirely in Latah County and runs for less than 14 miles (23 km); it starts near Deary at SH-8 and runs northwest, connecting with SH-6 near Harvard.

=== Equipment shipments ===
US-12 through Idaho has been proposed as a route for shipment of huge equipment from Lewiston, an inland port, to oil sands facilities near Fort McMurray, Alberta and to a refinery in Billings, Montana. On two-lane portions of the road, the equipment, weighing as much as 300 short tons (270 t; 270 long tons) and as much as 30 feet (9.1 m) high and 24 feet (7.3 m) wide, would occupy the entire roadway. The route is preferable to other routes due to the lack of underpasses and the great distances involved. The alternative is transport across the Great Plains from Texas or New Orleans. On US-12, the major obstacles were powerlines, which had to be raised or buried. That and other alterations to the highway such as turnouts would be paid for by the companies. The trucks would transport only at night, moving short distances between places where they would pull off and let traffic pass. A permit granted by the Idaho Transportation Department to ConocoPhillips in August 2010 is the subject of litigation initiated by householders along the route. On January 19, 2011, it was announced that the Idaho government would issue permits for four loads of refinery equipment to be transported from Lewiston to Billings.

The Port of Lewiston is the furthest inland seaport in the Western U.S. It ships wheat, barley, and legumes to Asia and the South Pacific as well as the Middle East and Africa. There are also inland seaports in Washington at the port of Clarkston and Port of Wilma in Whitman County.

== Major intersections ==
County	Location	mi	km	Destinations	Notes
Snake River		0.000	0.000	US 12 west – Walla Walla	Continuation into Washington
Snake River		0.000	0.000	Interstate Highway Bridge	
Nez Perce	Lewiston	2.605	4.192	SH-128 – Port Districts	
Nez Perce	Lewiston	2.831	4.556	US 95 north – Moscow, Coeur d'Alene	Western end of US 95 overlap
Nez Perce		10.036	16.151	US 95 south – Grangeville, Boise	Eastern end of US 95 overlap
Nez Perce		14.950	24.060	SH-3 north – Juliaetta, Kendrick	
Clearwater		43.980	70.779	SH-7 north (Michigan Avenue) – Orofino	Western end of SH-7 overlap
Clearwater		44.393	71.444	SH-7 south (Gilbert Grade Road)	Eastern end of SH-7 overlap
Lewis	Greer	51.568	82.991	SH-11 east – Weippe, Pierce	
Lewis	Kamiah	66.220	106.571	SH-162 south – Nezperce	
Idaho		73.850	118.850	SH-13 south – Kooskia	
Lolo Pass		174.410	280.686	US 12 east – Missoula	Continuation into Montana
1.000 mi = 1.609 km; 1.000 km = 0.621 mi: Concurrency terminus

U.S. Route 12
Previous state: Washington	Idaho	Next state: Montana
