= 2021 Idaho wildfires =

Natural disasters in the United States

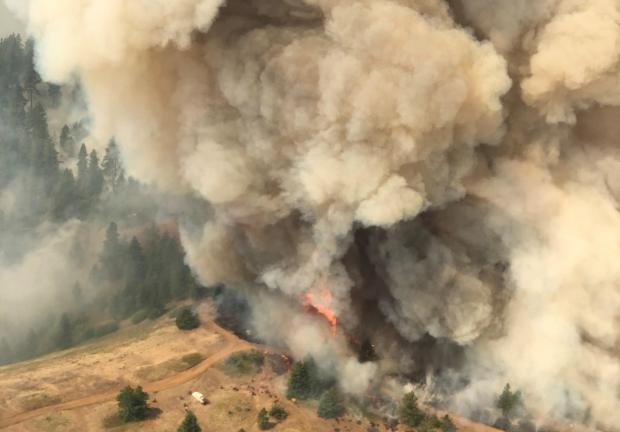
- A spot fire from the Snake River Complex on July 12
- Date: July 5 - October 26

Statistics
- Total fires: 1,332
- Total area: 439,600 acres

This is a list of wildfires across Idaho during 2021, that have burned more than 1,000 acres (400 hectares), produced significant structural damage or casualties, or otherwise been notable. Acreage and containment figures may not be up to date.

== Background ==
While the "fire season" in Idaho varies every year based on fire weather conditions, most wildfires occur from June to September. Fire activities normally increase in July and August because of drier conditions, hotter temperatures, and more lightning strikes from thunderstorms. However, wildfire severity can vary every year based on preseason conditions such as snowpack and the overcrowded growth of vegetation and dying trees.

== List of wildfires ==
Name	County	Acres	Start date	Containment date	Notes	Ref
Dixie-Jumbo Fires	Idaho, Clearwater	46,500	July 5	October 23	Caused by lightning	
Trestle Creek Complex	Shoshone, Bonner	6,631	July 7	October 14	Caused by lightning	
Mud Lick Fire	Lemhi	20,857	July 8	October 26	Caused by lightning	
Cougar Rock Complex	Clearwater	8,178	July 9	August 15	Caused by lightning	
Deer Fire	Boise	856	July 28	September 15	Caused by lightning	
Snake River Complex Fires	Lewis, Nez Perce	109,444	August 4	August 27	Caused by lightning	
