= St. Joseph's Mission =

St. Joseph's Mission may refer to:

Canada

- Saint Joseph's Mission (Williams Lake), a former Canadian Indian residential school in British Columbia

United States

- St. Joseph's Mission (Culdesac, Idaho)
- St. Joseph's Mission (Tampico, Washington)
