= Idaho State Highway 162 =

State highway in Idaho, United States

State Highway 162
- SH-162 highlighted in red

Route information
- Maintained by ITD
- Length: 31.077 mi (50.014 km)

Major junctions
- West end: SH-62 / SH-64 in Nezperce
- SH-64 in Kamiah
- East end: US 12 in Kamiah

Location
- Country: United States
- State: Idaho
- Counties: Lewis, Idaho

Highway system
- Idaho State Highway System; Interstate; US; State
← SH-128	→ SH-167

State Highway 162 (SH-162) is a state highway serving Lewis and Idaho counties in the North Central region of Idaho.

== Route description ==
State Highway 162 begins at the intersection of Oak Street and Fourth Avenue, signed as State Highway 62 and State Highway 64, in Nezperce. SH-162 travels south on Oak Street and turns west for two blocks on 8th Avenue before leaving Nezperce for unincorporated Lewis County, headed into the Lawyer Creek valley. The highway enters Idaho County turns east to follow Meadow Creek Road until it reaches Winona, where SH-162 turns north along Sevenmile Creek. The roadway re-enters Lewis County and follows Lawyer Creek into Kamiah, becoming Pine Street at city limits. SH-162 turns east onto 5th Street for two blocks after at an intersection with SH-64, turning north once again at Hill Street. The highway ends at an intersection with U.S. Route 12 at 3rd Street.

== History ==
The portion from Greencreek to Kamiah was once signed as SH-10 and then was renumbered to SH-62.

== Major intersections ==
County	Location	mi	km	Destinations	Notes
Lewis	Nezperce	0.000	0.000	SH-62 west / SH-64 east – Craigmont, Kamiah	Western end
Idaho	No major junctions				
Lewis	Kamiah	23.065	37.120	SH-64 west (5th Street) – Nezperce	
Lewis	Kamiah	31.077	50.014	US 12 (3rd Street) – Orofino, Missoula	Eastern end
1.000 mi = 1.609 km; 1.000 km = 0.621 mi
