= James F. Bridwell House =

Historic house in Idaho, United States

- U.S. National Register of Historic Places
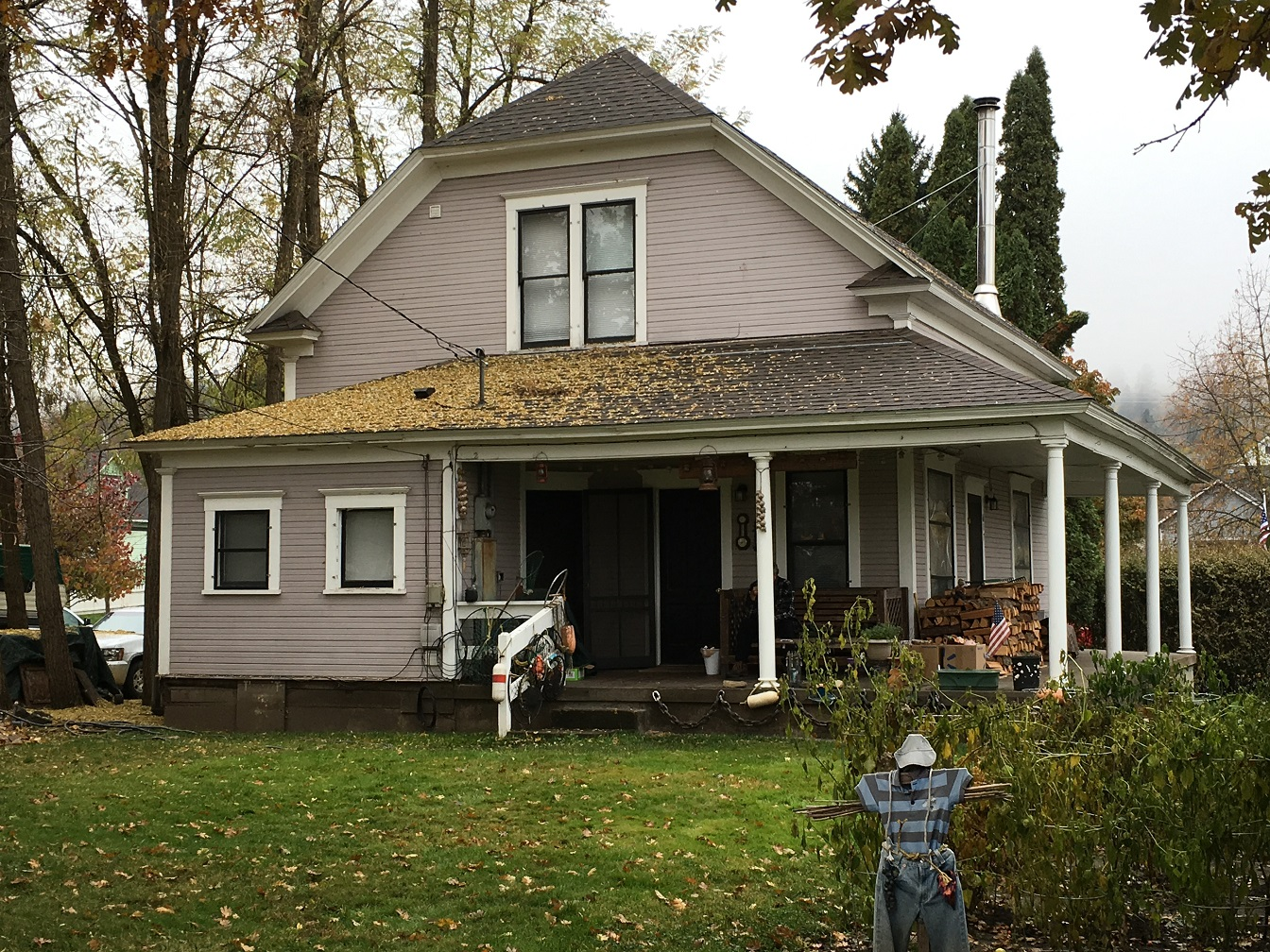

- Location within Idaho Location within the United States
- Location: 107 Fifth St. Kamiah, Idaho
- Coordinates: 46°13′37″N 116°01′44″W
- Area: less than one acre
- Built: 1907
- Architectural style: Colonial Revival
- NRHP reference No.: 88001446
- Added to NRHP: April 6, 1989

The James F. Bridwell House in Kamiah, Idaho was listed on the National Register of Historic Places in 1989. It has also been known as the Gena Dragseth House.

It is a square two-story house over a partial basement which was built in 1907. It has beaded shiplap siding.

The house was deemed significant for its association with "early settler and prominent citizen" Dr. James F. Bridwell. Bridwell was educated in Oregon and trained as a dentist in St. Louis. In a partnership with a Dr. Briley, he provided medical and dental services for the Northern Pacific Railroad construction.

== See also ==
- List of National Historic Landmarks in Idaho
- National Register of Historic Places listings in Lewis County, Idaho
