= Gifford, Idaho =

Unincorporated community in the state of Idaho, United States

- Unincorporated community
- Location within Idaho Location within the United States
- Coordinates: 46°26′36″N 116°33′24″W
- Country: United States
- State: Idaho
- County: Nez Perce
- Elevation: 2,949 ft (899 m)
- Time zone: UTC-8 (Pacific (PST))
  - Summer (DST): UTC-7 (PDT)
- Area codes: 208, 986
- GNIS feature ID: 396549

Gifford is an unincorporated community in Nez Perce County, Idaho, United States. Gifford is 7.5 miles (12.1 km) northeast of Culdesac. The community was platted in 1901 by Seth Gifford, a homesteader who moved to the area six years earlier. Gifford had a post office from 1901 until 1965 and a school from 1896 until 1961.

== History ==
Gifford's population was estimated at 50 in 1909, and was also 50 in 1960.
