= St. Joseph's Mission (Culdesac, Idaho) =

Historic church in Idaho, United States

- U.S. National Register of Historic Places
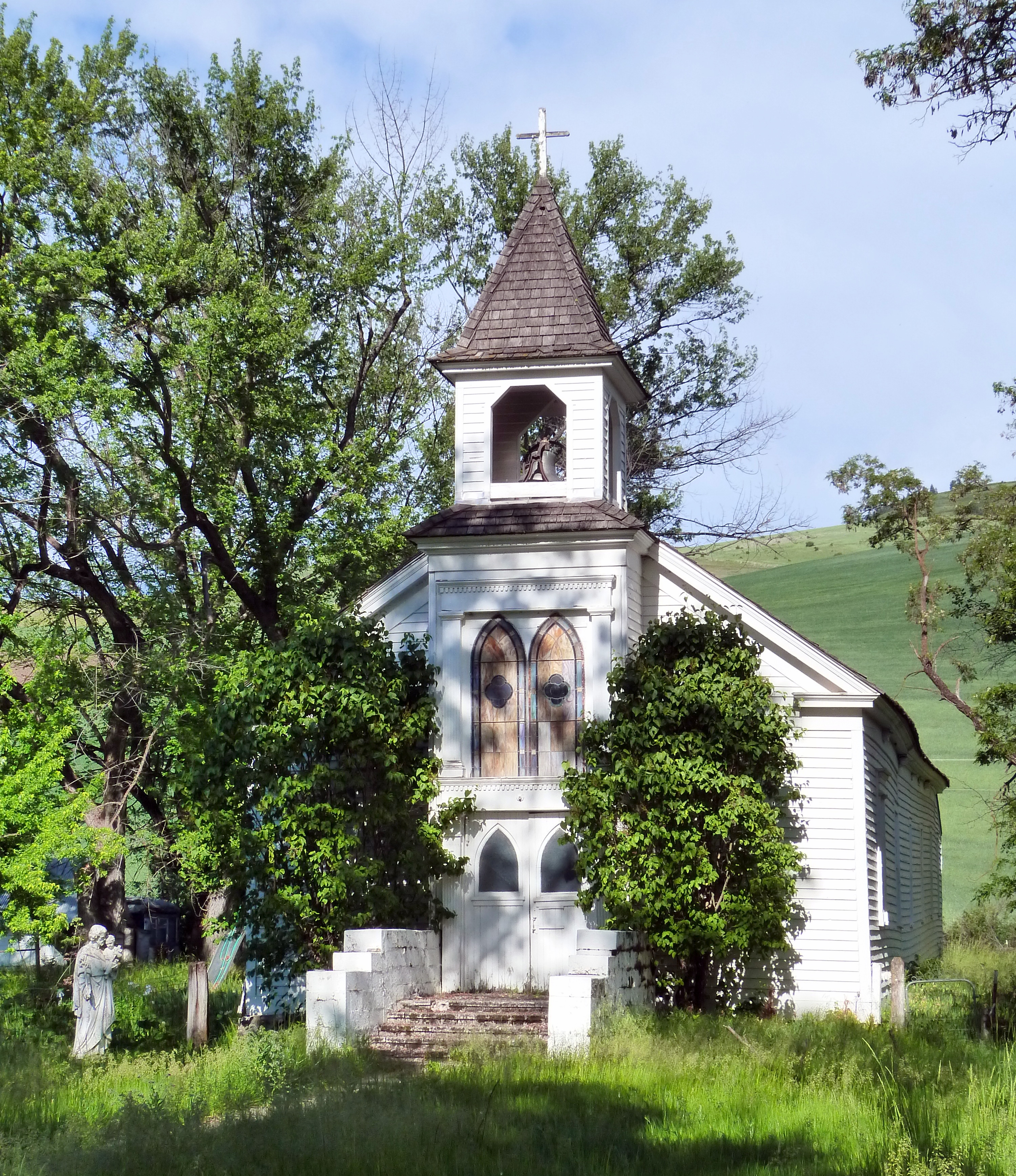
- The building's exterior in 2015

- Location within Idaho Location within the United States
- Location: Four miles south of Jacques Spur on Mission Creek off U.S. 95, near Culdesac, Idaho
- Coordinates: 46°18′53″N 116°42′37″W
- Area: 1 acre (0.40 ha)
- Built: 1874
- Built by: Williams, M.
- NRHP reference No.: 76000677
- Added to NRHP: June 24, 1976

The St. Joseph's Mission near Culdesac, Idaho is a wood-frame building which was listed on the National Register of Historic Places in 1976.

The original sanctuary part of the building was built in 1874 and was 60 by 26 feet (18.3 m × 7.9 m) in plan. The nave was extended in 1904.

== See also ==
- List of National Historic Landmarks in Idaho
- National Register of Historic Places listings in Lewis County, Idaho
