= Dixie-Jumbo Fires =

2021 wildfire in Idaho, USA

- Part of the 2021 Idaho wildfires
- Date: July 5, 2021 – unknown
- Location: Riggins, Idaho
- Coordinates: 45.586°N 115.444°W

Statistics
- Burned area: 20,947 acres (8,477 ha)

Impacts
- Structures destroyed: 20

Ignition
- Cause: Lightning

Map
- Location in Northern Idaho

The Dixie-Jumbo Fires are a complex of wildfires that burned in Idaho. The fires started near Riggins, Idaho on July 5, 2021. It burned at least 20,947 acres (8,477 ha).

== Events ==
=== July ===
The Dixie-Jumbo Fires were first reported on July 5, 2021, at around 12:45 pm MDT.

=== Cause ===
The cause of both fires is believed to be due to lightning.

=== Containment ===
As of August 5, the fire was 12% percent contained.

=== Injuries ===
In 07/31/2020, an unnamed a Bureau of Land Management engine crewmember displayed symptoms of heat illness. The illness progressed rapidly, and the firefighter was not responding to verbal stimuli. The firefighter was transported to a hospital in Missoula, Montana and was diagnosed with an external heatstroke. Three days later, the firefighter was released from the hospital.
