= Idaho State Highway 62 =

State highway in Idaho, United States

State Highway 62
- SH-62 highlighted in red

Route information
- Maintained by ITD
- Length: 15.410 mi (24.800 km)

Major junctions
- West end: US 95 Bus. in Craigmont
- East end: SH-64 / SH-162 in Nezperce

Location
- Country: United States
- State: Idaho
- Counties: Lewis

Highway system
- Idaho State Highway System; Interstate; US; State
← SH-61	→ SH-64

State Highway 62 (SH-62) is a 15.410-mile-long (24.800 km) state highway in Idaho that travels from Craigmont to Nezperce.

== Route description ==
Idaho State Highway 62 begins at an intersection with U.S. Route 95 Business in Craigmont. The highway proceeds northeast through Craigmont, before bending eastward and exiting the community. The route proceeds eastward through rural area, before bending northeast and continuing. The road bends northward and proceeds, before bending eastward for a short distance. The highway intersects a few small roads, continuing north and northeast, before bending southeastward. The roadway continues eastward, crossing the small Holes Creek, and intersecting numerous small roads. The highway bends southeastward, proceeding in that direction before bending southward. After bending south, the roadway proceeds into the community of Nez Perce, where it reaches its eastern terminus, an intersection with State Highway 64 and State Highway 162.

== History ==
A portion of SH-62 was once assigned as SH-10 from Greencreek to Kamiah from 1952 to 1953. It is now part of SH-162.

== Major junctions ==
The entire route is in Lewis County.

Location	mi	km	Destinations	Notes
Craigmont	0.000	0.000	US 95 Bus.	Western terminus
Nezperce	15.410	24.800	SH-64 / SH-162	Eastern terminus
1.000 mi = 1.609 km; 1.000 km = 0.621 mi
