= Ellis (Nez Perce) =

Nez Perce leader (1810–1848)

- Born: c. 1810
- Died: March 1848
- Other names: Ellice
- Citizenship: Nez Perce

Ellis or Ellice (c. 1810–March 1848) was a Nez Perce leader. His grandfather was the respected leader Hohots Ilppilp (also known as Red Grizzly Bear), who met with Lewis and Clark.

As a teenager, Ellis went to the Red River Colony where he learnt to read, write and speak English from Christian tutors. He lived in the area of Kamiah, Idaho where he was involved with farming and ranching. He was the first person to be elected leader of the Nez Perce, with help from Elijah White, the U. S. Indian agent for Oregon Country. Ellis was not respected by his people, however, as he had never won honours in hunting or war, and became quickly conceited upon his election.

In March 1848, Nez Perce leaders received news that Ellis and sixty members of his group had died, supposedly of measles. News of Ellis' death caused contention between his followers and the whites. Upon his death, a young man called Richard was appointed the new leader of the Nez Perce.
