= 1996 United States presidential election in Idaho =

- November 5, 1996

Nominee	Bob Dole	Bill Clinton	Ross Perot
Party	Republican	Democratic	Reform
Home state	Kansas	Arkansas	Texas
Running mate	Jack Kemp	Al Gore	Patrick Choate
Electoral vote	4	0	0
Popular vote	256,595	165,443	62,518
Percentage	52.18%	33.65%	12.71%
County results
Dole
40–50%
50–60%
60–70%
70–80%
Clinton
40–50%
50–60%
President before election
Bill Clinton
Democratic
Elected President
Bill Clinton
Democratic

The 1996 United States presidential election in Idaho took place on November 5, 1996, as part of the 1996 United States presidential election. State voters chose four representatives, or electors to the Electoral College, who voted for president and vice president.

Idaho was won by Senator Bob Dole (R-KS) over President Bill Clinton (D), with Dole winning 52.18% to 33.65% for a margin of 18.53%. Billionaire businessman Ross Perot (Reform Party of the United States of America-TX) finished in third, with 12.71% of the popular vote. As of the 2024 presidential election, this is the last election in which Nez Perce County and Shoshone County voted for a Democratic presidential candidate. Clinton became the first ever Democrat to win the White House without carrying Benewah or Lewis Counties, and the first to do so without carrying Clearwater County since Woodrow Wilson in 1916.

With 52.18% of the popular vote, Idaho proved to be Dole's fourth strongest state in the 1996 election after neighboring Utah, Kansas and Nebraska. The state proved to be Ross Perot's third strongest state in the election, after Maine and neighboring Montana. This also marked the first time since statehood that a Democrat was reelected president without carrying Idaho.

== Results ==
1996 United States presidential election in Idaho
Party	Candidate	Running mate	Votes	Percentage	Electoral votes
Republican	Bob Dole	Jack Kemp	256,595	52.18%	4
Democratic	Bill Clinton (incumbent)	Al Gore (incumbent)	165,443	33.65%	0
Reform	Ross Perot	Patrick Choate	62,518	12.71%	0
Libertarian	Harry Browne	Jo Jorgensen	3,325	0.68%	0
U.S. Taxpayers' Party	Howard Phillips	Herbert Titus	2,230	0.45%	0
Natural Law	Dr. John Hagelin	Dr. V. Tompkins	1,600	0.33%	0
Write-in	Charles Collins	Rosemary Giumarra	7	<0.01%	0
Write-in	Jack Fellure		1	<0.01%	0
Totals			491,719	100.00%	4

=== Results by county ===
County	Bob Dole Republican		Bill Clinton Democratic		Ross Perot Reform		Various candidates Other parties		Margin		Total votes cast
County	#	%	#	%	#	%	#	%	#	%	Total votes cast
Ada	61,811	52.50%	43,040	36.55%	11,171	9.49%	1,721	1.46%	18,771	15.95%	117,743
Adams	1,053	54.03%	537	27.55%	311	15.96%	48	2.46%	516	26.48%	1,949
Bannock	14,058	44.80%	12,806	40.81%	4,158	13.25%	355	1.13%	1,252	3.99%	31,377
Bear Lake	1,583	56.37%	805	28.67%	396	14.10%	24	0.85%	778	27.70%	2,808
Benewah	1,667	42.54%	1,488	37.97%	701	17.89%	63	1.61%	179	4.57%	3,919
Bingham	8,391	56.39%	4,304	28.92%	2,021	13.58%	165	1.11%	4,087	27.47%	14,881
Blaine	3,003	36.55%	3,840	46.73%	1,193	14.52%	181	2.20%	-837	-10.18%	8,217
Boise	1,576	53.26%	879	29.71%	440	14.87%	64	2.16%	697	23.55%	2,959
Bonner	6,207	43.00%	5,294	36.67%	2,669	18.49%	266	1.84%	913	6.33%	14,436
Bonneville	19,977	59.90%	9,013	27.03%	3,921	11.76%	439	1.32%	10,964	32.87%	33,350
Boundary	1,937	50.05%	1,194	30.85%	626	16.18%	113	2.92%	743	19.20%	3,870
Butte	741	49.70%	507	34.00%	233	15.63%	10	0.67%	234	15.70%	1,491
Camas	283	52.02%	156	28.68%	95	17.46%	10	1.84%	127	23.34%	544
Canyon	23,988	59.48%	11,800	29.26%	3,956	9.81%	584	1.45%	12,188	30.22%	40,328
Caribou	1,740	55.77%	841	26.96%	501	16.06%	38	1.22%	899	28.81%	3,120
Cassia	4,663	63.65%	1,596	21.79%	976	13.32%	91	1.24%	3,067	41.86%	7,326
Clark	266	61.29%	117	26.96%	45	10.37%	6	1.38%	149	34.33%	434
Clearwater	1,658	42.70%	1,507	38.81%	650	16.74%	68	1.75%	151	3.89%	3,883
Custer	1,249	53.93%	635	27.42%	400	17.27%	32	1.38%	614	26.51%	2,316
Elmore	3,668	53.13%	2,324	33.66%	845	12.24%	67	0.97%	1,344	19.47%	6,904
Franklin	2,435	62.56%	807	20.73%	589	15.13%	61	1.57%	1,628	41.83%	3,892
Fremont	3,042	62.92%	1,114	23.04%	630	13.03%	49	1.01%	1,928	39.88%	4,835
Gem	3,362	53.96%	1,968	31.58%	833	13.37%	68	1.09%	1,394	22.38%	6,231
Gooding	2,637	51.05%	1,503	29.09%	980	18.97%	46	0.89%	1,134	21.96%	5,166
Idaho	3,871	54.54%	1,979	27.88%	1,083	15.26%	165	2.32%	1,892	26.66%	7,098
Jefferson	4,925	66.53%	1,427	19.28%	994	13.43%	57	0.77%	3,498	47.25%	7,403
Jerome	3,358	54.82%	1,679	27.41%	1,014	16.56%	74	1.21%	1,679	27.41%	6,125
Kootenai	18,740	47.82%	13,627	34.78%	6,083	15.52%	736	1.88%	5,113	13.04%	39,186
Latah	6,311	38.74%	7,741	47.52%	1,828	11.22%	410	2.52%	-1,430	-8.78%	16,290
Lemhi	2,334	60.34%	1,015	26.24%	461	11.92%	58	1.50%	1,319	34.10%	3,868
Lewis	861	45.80%	674	35.85%	316	16.81%	29	1.54%	187	9.95%	1,880
Lincoln	744	47.63%	478	30.60%	319	20.42%	21	1.34%	266	17.03%	1,562
Madison	5,706	73.84%	1,216	15.73%	744	9.63%	62	0.80%	4,490	58.11%	7,728
Minidoka	4,008	56.81%	1,977	28.02%	977	13.85%	93	1.32%	2,031	28.79%	7,055
Nez Perce	6,675	39.98%	7,491	44.87%	2,385	14.28%	145	0.87%	-816	-4.89%	16,696
Oneida	993	57.53%	429	24.86%	285	16.51%	19	1.10%	564	32.67%	1,726
Owyhee	2,033	61.18%	895	26.93%	354	10.65%	41	1.23%	1,138	34.25%	3,323
Payette	3,901	55.59%	2,119	30.19%	906	12.91%	92	1.31%	1,782	25.40%	7,018
Power	1,501	51.12%	1,070	36.44%	344	11.72%	21	0.72%	431	14.68%	2,936
Shoshone	1,588	26.67%	2,981	50.07%	1,283	21.55%	102	1.71%	-1,393	-23.40%	5,954
Teton	1,251	50.28%	866	34.81%	326	13.10%	45	1.81%	385	15.47%	2,488
Twin Falls	12,393	54.13%	6,826	29.81%	3,383	14.78%	294	1.28%	5,567	24.32%	22,896
Valley	2,089	48.83%	1,564	36.56%	568	13.28%	57	1.33%	525	12.27%	4,278
Washington	2,318	54.90%	1,314	31.12%	525	12.43%	65	1.54%	1,004	23.78%	4,222
Totals	256,595	52.18%	165,443	33.65%	62,518	12.71%	7,163	1.46%	91,152	18.53%	491,719

==== Counties that flipped from Democratic to Republican ====
- Benewah
- Bonner
- Clearwater
- Lewis

== See also ==
- United States presidential elections in Idaho
- Presidency of Bill Clinton
