= Idaho State Highway 128 =

State highway in Idaho, United States

State Highway 128
- A map of northern Lewiston with SH-128 highlighted in red

Route information
- Maintained by ITD
- Length: 2.198 mi (3.537 km)
- Existed: 1989–present

Major junctions
- West end: SR 128 at Washington state line
- East end: US 12 in Lewiston

Location
- Country: United States
- State: Idaho
- Counties: Nez Perce

Highway system
- Idaho State Highway System; Interstate; US; State
← SH-87	→ SH-162

State Highway 128 (SH-128) is a 2.2-mile-long (3.5 km) state highway in the U.S. state of Idaho, serving the city of Lewiston in Nez Perce County. The highway travels east along the Clearwater River within Lewiston from Washington State Route 128 (SR 128) to U.S. Route 12 (US 12). It was created in 1989 after improvements were made to an existing county road.

== Route description ==
SH-128 begins at the eastern terminus of SR 128 at the Washington–Idaho state line that separates the cities of Clarkston and Lewiston. The highway travels east along the Clearwater River as the Down River Road through an industrial park located in northern Lewiston. SH-128 intersects its spur route and turns northeast towards its eastern terminus, an intersection with US 12 eastbound.

To the north of the highway is Lewiston Hill. The Old Spiral Highway has its southern terminus at an intersection with SH-128.

Every year, the Idaho Transportation Department (ITD) conducts a series of surveys on its highways in the state to measure traffic volume. This is expressed in terms of average annual daily traffic (AADT), which is a measure of traffic volume for any average day of the year. In 2011, ITD calculated that 4,702 vehicles per day used SH-128 between the Washington state line and US-12.

== History ==
SH-128 was designated by the Idaho Transportation Board on August 18, 1989, after requests from local port officials to improve an existing county road named Down River Road. The number was chosen to match an existing highway in Washington, which was extended to the state border in 1990 by the Washington State Legislature.

== Major intersections ==
The entire route is in Lewiston, Nez Perce County.

mi	km	Destinations	Notes
0.000	0.000	SR 128 west – Clarkston	Western terminus, Washington state line
2.093	3.368	SH-128 Spur south to US 12 west – Lewiston	
2.198	3.537	US 12 east to US 95 – Boise, Moscow	Eastern terminus
1.000 mi = 1.609 km; 1.000 km = 0.621 mi

== Spur route ==
State Highway 128 Spur
- Location: Lewiston, Idaho
- Length: 0.130 mi (209 m)

SH-128 has a short, 0.130-mile-long (0.209 km) spur route near its eastern terminus at US 12 in Lewiston. The spur route travels southeast from SH-128 to US 12 westbound and serves as an extension of the intersection of the two highways to the north.
