= Idaho State Highway 64 =

State highway in Idaho, United States

State Highway 64
- SH-64 highlighted in red

Route information
- Maintained by ITD
- Length: 15.419 mi (24.814 km)

Major junctions
- West end: SH-62 / SH-162 in Nezperce
- East end: SH-162 in Kamiah

Location
- Country: United States
- State: Idaho
- Counties: Lewis

Highway system
- Idaho State Highway System; Interstate; US; State
← SH-62	→ SH-66

State Highway 64 (SH-64) is a 15.419-mile-long (24.814 km) state highway located entirely within Lewis County in North Central Idaho. SH-64 runs from SH-62 and SH-162 in Nezperce east to SH-162 in Kamiah. The highway is maintained by the Idaho Transportation Department (ITD).

== Route description ==
SH-64 begins at a junction with SH-62 and SH-162 in downtown Nezperce. The highway heads east from here, passing Nez Perce Municipal Airport. In eastern Nezperce, the route turns north along Beech Street before leaving the city to the northeast. Outside of Nezperce, the highway heads east through ranchland as a two-lane paved road. The route passes several local roads before curving to the southeast. Along the southeast leg, the road has an unpaved gravel surface for three miles and runs along the side of a mountain. Past this stretch, the highway turns briefly to the east before twisting northward, where it passes through a forested area. The route passes a group of houses before making a sharp turn to the south. From here, the highway follows a winding path into Kamiah. In Kamiah, the road passes southeast through a residential area parallel to U.S. Route 12; while the two highways do not intersect, they are connected by local streets. According to ITD, SH-64 officially ends at a junction with SH-162 in Kamiah; however, highway signage indicates that the highway follows SH-162 for several blocks before terminating at US 12.

== Major intersections ==
The entire route is in Lewis County.

Location	mi	km	Destinations	Notes
Nezperce	0.000	0.000	SH-62 / SH-162	Western terminus
Kamiah	15.419	24.814	SH-162	Eastern terminus
1.000 mi = 1.609 km; 1.000 km = 0.621 mi
