= Lenore, Idaho =

Unincorporated community in the state of Idaho, United States

- Unincorporated community
- Location within Idaho Location within the United States
- Coordinates: 46°30′31″N 116°33′04″W
- Country: United States
- State: Idaho
- County: Nez Perce
- Elevation: 945 ft (288 m)
- Time zone: UTC-8 (Pacific (PST))
  - Summer (DST): UTC-7 (PDT)
- ZIP code: 83541
- Area codes: 208, 986
- GNIS feature ID: 396782

Lenore is an unincorporated community in Nez Perce County, Idaho, United States. Lenore is located on the north bank of the Clearwater River 23 miles (37 km) east-northeast of Lewiston. Lenore has a post office with ZIP code 83541.

== History ==
Lenore's population was 40 in 1960.

In 1903, Lenore was an important railroad station, and was a small trading and shipping center along the Clearwater Short Line Railway. There was a Lenore Trading Company, a general store, and a hotel managed by J.B. McGuire. The post office was established in 1900.

It was an important grain shipping point in early years, and the site of the largest grain tram on the lower Clearwater River. The tram carried sacks of grain more than 4 miles, down from the rim of the canyon and across the Clearwater River to the railroad tracks. It was a feat of engineering that enabled farmers on the Camas Prairie to haul their grain just to the top of the ridge, rather than having to wind down the steep, horse-tiring grades. An estimated 75,000 to 100,000 bushels of grain came down the tram annually in early years. Tram was put out of commission by a fire in 1937 and never used again.
