= Lewis County, Idaho =

County in Idaho, United States

- County
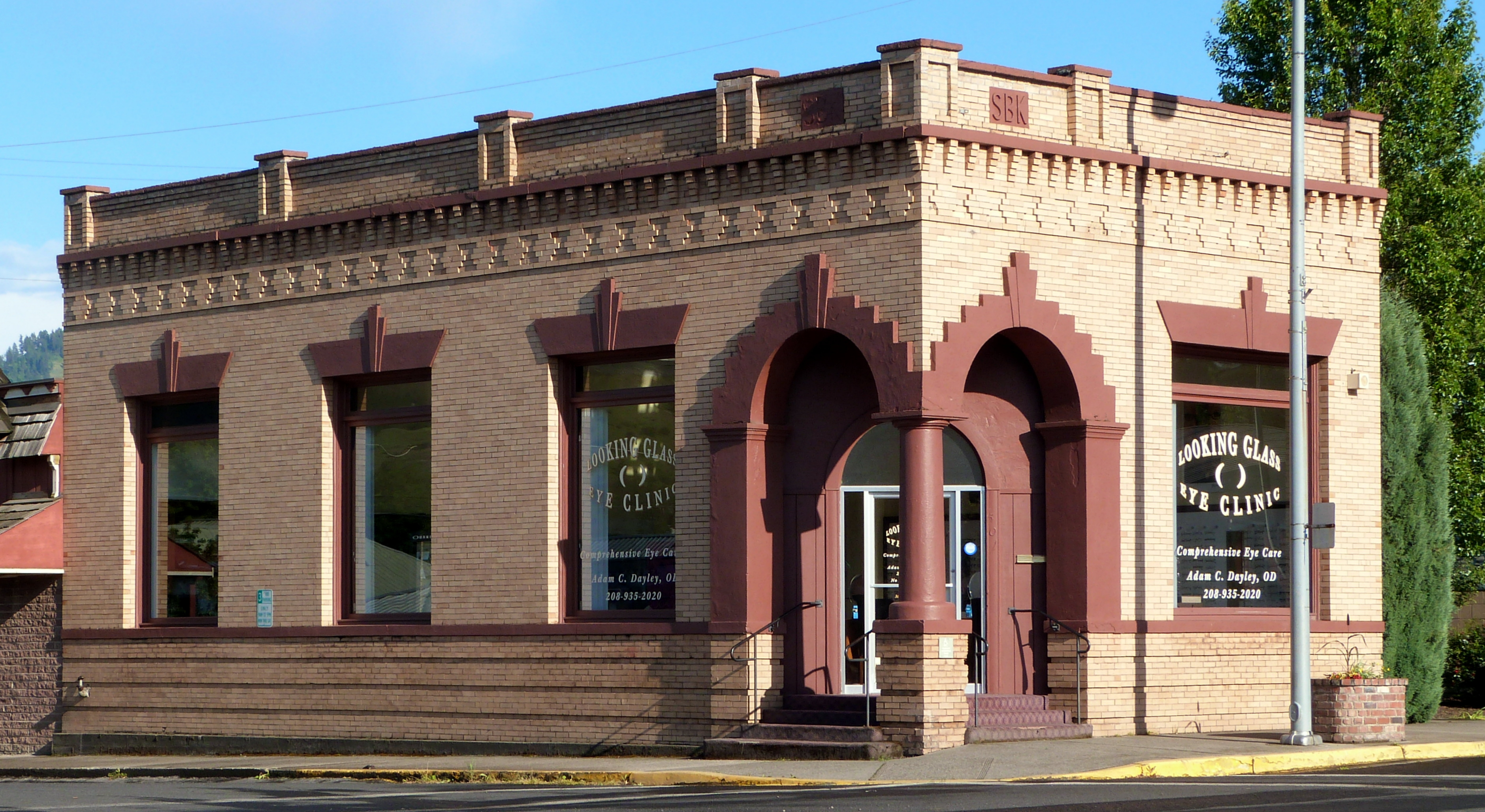
- State Bank of Kamiah

- Seal

- Location within the U.S. state of Idaho
- Coordinates: 46°14′N 116°26′W
- Country: United States
- State: Idaho
- Founded: March 3, 1911
- Named for: Meriwether Lewis
- Seat: Nezperce
- Largest city: Kamiah

Area
  - Total: 480 sq mi (1,200 km^{2})
  - Land: 479 sq mi (1,240 km^{2})
  - Water: 0.9 sq mi (2.3 km^{2}) 0.2%

Population (2020)
  - Total: 3,533
  - Estimate (2025): 3,704 ▲
  - Density: 7.38/sq mi (2.85/km^{2})
- Time zone: UTC−8 (Pacific)
  - Summer (DST): UTC−7 (PDT)
- Congressional district: 1st
- Website: lewiscountyid.us

Lewis County is a county located in the north central region of the U.S. state of Idaho. As of the 2020 census, the population was 3,533, making it the fourth-least populous county in Idaho. The county seat is Nezperce, and Kamiah is the largest city. Partitioned from Nez Perce County and established in 1911, it was named after the explorer Meriwether Lewis. Most of the county is within the Nez Perce Indian Reservation, though Native Americans comprise less than 6% of the county population. Similar to the opening of lands in Oklahoma, the U.S. government opened the reservation for white settlement in November 1895. The proclamation had been signed less than two weeks earlier by President Cleveland.

== History ==
=== Indigenous peoples and explorers ===
Early settlement of Idaho by native peoples occurred around 14,000 years ago. Initially, natives of the region were spear hunters of big game. Documented settlement of Idaho's Camas Prairie by the Nez Perce dates back more than 8,000 years with characteristics of the Old Cordilleran Culture appearing in the region. Characteristics of this culture consist of more sophisticated tools for hunting and the introduction of art forms. The Nez Perce, like their Shoshoni counterparts of southern Idaho, gained access to escaped Spanish horses from the 16th-century exploration and settlement of New Spain that were traded throughout North America. The transcontinental Lewis and Clark expedition's Corps of Discovery encountered the Nez Perce tribe in 1805 and camped near Kamiah in the winter of 1806. They then returned to the main Clearwater River to continue west towards the Pacific Ocean. The majority of Nez Perce County's territory is located within the boundary of the Nez Perce Reservation. The reservation was established in 1859 following the provisions of an 1855 treaty with the four bands of the Nez Perce Tribe. Relations with the Nez Perce were amicable until discovery of gold at multiple locations within the reservation's boundaries created tension starting in 1860. A smaller reservation was negotiated with the Kamiah and Lapwai bands of Nez Perce, with a treaty signed in 1867. The Salmon-Wallowa and lower Snake River bands were not a party to the treaty and efforts to force them to the reservation resulted in the Nez Perce War in 1877 that decisively forced all of the Nez Perce to the Nez Perce Reservation. Settlement of non-natives within the boundary of the reservation was authorized starting in 1894.

=== Non-native settlement ===
With the opening of non-native settlement by agreement of 1894, settlements emerged starting at Winchester in 1896 followed by Craigmont and Kamiah areas starting by 1898. By the 1900 Census, Nez Perce County established precincts for Central Ridge, Cold Springs, Fletcher, and Nez Perce within the territory of present Lewis County. Their combined population at the time was 2,782.

Settlement increased along the route of the Camas Prairie Railroad which reached Reubens in 1906 with operation of the line starting in 1908. The railroad had stops at Nucrag, Reubens, and Craigmont. By 1908, multiple stage lines commenced operation with terminus at Kamiah. At the 1910 Census, Nez Perce established additional precincts for Chesley, Kamiah, Mason, Mohler, and Winchester. Together, all precincts at the 1910 census had a population of 5,037.

Nez Perce Village incorporated in 1903 with Kippen Village following in 1907. Vollmer town was incorporated in 1908 with the villages of Ilo and Kamiah incorporated in 1909. Reubens and Winchester Villages incorporated by 1920. Ilo and Vollmer consolidated as Craigmont in 1920. Kippen Village was dis-incorporated by 1940 as it is absent from that census.

== Geography ==
According to the U.S. Census Bureau, the county has a total area of 480 square miles (1,200 km^{2}), of which 479 square miles (1,240 km^{2}) is land and 0.9 square miles (2.3 km^{2}) (0.2%) is water. It is the fourth-smallest county in Idaho by area. The county contains the northern portion of the Camas Prairie, an elevated prairie-like region of the middle Columbia basin, south of the Clearwater River. The Clearwater River forms the eastern boundary of Lewis County, just upstream of where the Lewis and Clark Expedition put their canoes in the water for the trip to the Pacific Ocean.

=== Adjacent counties ===
- Nez Perce County – northwest
- Idaho County – southeast
- Clearwater County – northeast

=== Major highways ===
- – US 12
- – US 95
- – SH-7
- – SH-11
- – SH-62
- – SH-64
- – SH-162

=== National protected area ===
- Clearwater National Forest (part)

== Demographics ==
Historical population
Census	Pop.	Note	%±
1920	5,851		—
1930	5,238		−10.5%
1940	4,666		−10.9%
1950	4,208		−9.8%
1960	4,423		5.1%
1970	3,867		−12.6%
1980	4,118		6.5%
1990	3,516		−14.6%
2000	3,747		6.6%
2010	3,821		2.0%
2020	3,533		−7.5%
2025 (est.)	3,704	▲	4.8%
U.S. Decennial Census; 1790–1960 1900–1990; 1990–2000 2010–2020 2020

=== Racial and ethnic composition ===
Lewis County, Idaho – Racial and ethnic composition Note: the US Census treats Hispanic/Latino as an ethnic category. This table excludes Latinos from the racial categories and assigns them to a separate category. Hispanics/Latinos may be of any race.
Race / Ethnicity (NH = Non-Hispanic)	Pop 1980	Pop 1990	Pop 2000	Pop 2010	Pop 2020	% 1980	% 1990	% 2000	% 2010	% 2020
White alone (NH)	3,848	3,287	3,427	3,398	3,031	93.44%	93.49%	91.46%	88.93%	85.79%
Black or African American alone (NH)	3	4	13	14	6	0.07%	0.11%	0.35%	0.37%	0.17%
Native American or Alaska Native alone (NH)	209	169	137	176	181	5.08%	4.81%	3.66%	4.61%	5.12%
Asian alone (NH)	12	14	14	12	7	0.29%	0.40%	0.37%	0.31%	0.20%
Native Hawaiian or Pacific Islander alone (NH)	x	x	3	5	1	x	x	0.08%	0.13%	0.03%
Other race alone (NH)	0	0	13	1	12	0.00%	0.00%	0.35%	0.03%	0.34%
Mixed race or Multiracial (NH)	x	x	69	87	157	x	x	1.84%	2.28%	4.44%
Hispanic or Latino (any race)	46	42	71	128	138	1.12%	1.19%	1.89%	3.35%	3.91%
Total	4,118	3,516	3,747	3,821	3,533	100.00%	100.00%	100.00%	100.00%	100.00%

=== 2020 census ===
As of the 2020 census, the county had a population of 3,533. The median age was 48.8 years. 20.8% of residents were under the age of 18 and 26.0% of residents were 65 years of age or older. For every 100 females there were 105.9 males, and for every 100 females age 18 and over there were 103.6 males age 18 and over.

The racial makeup of the county was 87.3% White, 0.2% Black or African American, 5.2% American Indian and Alaska Native, 0.3% Asian, 0.0% Native Hawaiian and Pacific Islander, 1.2% from some other race, and 5.8% from two or more races. Hispanic or Latino residents of any race comprised 3.9% of the population.

0.0% of residents lived in urban areas, while 100.0% lived in rural areas.

There were 1,528 households in the county, of which 25.2% had children under the age of 18 living with them and 23.2% had a female householder with no spouse or partner present. About 33.0% of all households were made up of individuals and 18.0% had someone living alone who was 65 years of age or older.

There were 1,810 housing units, of which 15.6% were vacant. Among occupied housing units, 71.3% were owner-occupied and 28.7% were renter-occupied. The homeowner vacancy rate was 3.2% and the rental vacancy rate was 5.9%.

=== 2010 census ===
As of the 2010 United States census, there were 3,821 people, 1,657 households, and 1,041 families living in the county. The population density was 8.0 inhabitants per square mile (3.1/km^{2}). There were 1,880 housing units at an average density of 3.9 units per square mile (1.5 units/km^{2}). The racial makeup of the county was 90.3% white, 4.7% American Indian, 0.4% black or African American, 0.4% Asian, 0.1% Pacific islander, 1.6% from other races, and 2.4% from two or more races. Those of Hispanic or Latino origin made up 3.3% of the population. In terms of ancestry, 39.4% were German, 16.7% were English, 16.5% were Irish, and 3.0% were American.

Of the 1,657 households, 24.8% had children under the age of 18 living with them, 50.8% were married couples living together, 7.6% had a female householder with no husband present, 37.2% were non-families, and 32.6% of all households were made up of individuals. The average household size was 2.26 and the average family size was 2.84. The median age was 48.0 years.

The median income for a household in the county was $35,808 and the median income for a family was $41,250. Males had a median income of $32,933 versus $23,850 for females. The per capita income for the county was $18,580. About 10.4% of families and 16.0% of the population were below the poverty line, including 30.1% of those under age 18 and 7.2% of those age 65 or over.

=== 2000 census ===
As of the census of 2000, there were 3,747 people, 1,554 households, and 1,050 families living in the county. The population density was 8 people per square mile (3.1 people/km^{2}). There were 1,795 housing units at an average density of 4 units per square mile (1.5 units/km^{2}). The racial makeup of the county was 92.21% White, 0.35% Black or African American, 3.84% Native American, 0.43% Asian, 0.08% Pacific Islander, 0.93% from other races, and 2.16% from two or more races. 1.89% of the population were Hispanic or Latino of any race. 30.6% were of German, 17.5% American, 10.6% English and 8.7% Irish ancestry.

There were 1,554 households, out of which 27.50% had children under the age of 18 living with them, 57.80% were married couples living together, and 32.40% were non-families. 28.10% of all households were made up of individuals, and 14.50% had someone living alone who was 65 years of age or older. The average household size was 2.39 and the average family size was 2.92.

In the county, the population was spread out, with 25.40% under the age of 18, 5.30% from 18 to 24, 23.80% from 25 to 44, 27.10% from 45 to 64, and 18.50% who were 65 years of age or older. The median age was 42 years. For every 100 females there were 101.90 males. For every 100 females age 18 and over, there were 98.20 males.

The median income for a household in the county was $31,413, and the median income for a family was $37,336. Males had a median income of $31,021 versus $22,538 for females. The per capita income for the county was $15,942. About 8.70% of families and 12.00% of the population were below the poverty line, including 12.90% of those under age 18 and 9.00% of those age 65 or over.

== Communities ==
=== Cities ===
- Craigmont
- Kamiah
- Nezperce
- Reubens
- Winchester

=== Unincorporated community ===
- Slickpoo

== Politics ==
As a unionized logging county, Lewis County was the most Democratic single county in Idaho during the Fifth Party System – it never voted Republican between 1932 and 1968 – and retained its Democratic leanings into the 1980s when Michael Dukakis won a majority while losing nationwide. Since the 1990s, however, the county has tilted strongly Republican in US presidential elections.

United States presidential election results for Lewis County, Idaho
Year	Republican		Democratic		Third party(ies)	
Year	No.	%	No.	%	No.	%
1912	436	16.97%	1,131	44.02%	1,002	39.00%
1916	901	39.28%	1,255	54.71%	138	6.02%
1920	1,013	58.49%	712	41.11%	7	0.40%
1924	650	32.44%	601	29.99%	753	37.57%
1928	1,146	58.35%	793	40.38%	25	1.27%
1932	526	26.88%	1,390	71.03%	41	2.10%
1936	507	23.39%	1,612	74.35%	49	2.26%
1940	729	33.17%	1,462	66.52%	7	0.32%
1944	589	32.52%	1,222	67.48%	0	0.00%
1948	487	27.62%	1,224	69.43%	52	2.95%
1952	1,004	44.04%	1,276	55.96%	0	0.00%
1956	833	39.20%	1,292	60.80%	0	0.00%
1960	781	35.29%	1,432	64.71%	0	0.00%
1964	487	23.83%	1,557	76.17%	0	0.00%
1968	697	38.70%	927	51.47%	177	9.83%
1972	961	56.97%	635	37.64%	91	5.39%
1976	824	46.61%	898	50.79%	46	2.60%
1980	1,088	53.00%	774	37.70%	191	9.30%
1984	1,000	60.02%	648	38.90%	18	1.08%
1988	786	48.76%	807	50.06%	19	1.18%
1992	593	33.35%	674	37.91%	511	28.74%
1996	861	45.80%	674	35.85%	345	18.35%
2000	1,295	76.72%	335	19.85%	58	3.44%
2004	1,359	74.67%	440	24.18%	21	1.15%
2008	1,275	70.68%	479	26.55%	50	2.77%
2012	1,173	72.63%	396	24.52%	46	2.85%
2016	1,202	75.60%	270	16.98%	118	7.42%
2020	1,489	79.63%	349	18.66%	32	1.71%
2024	1,503	81.42%	305	16.52%	38	2.06%

== See also ==
- National Register of Historic Places listings in Lewis County, Idaho
