= Nez Perce County, Idaho =

County in Idaho, United States

- County
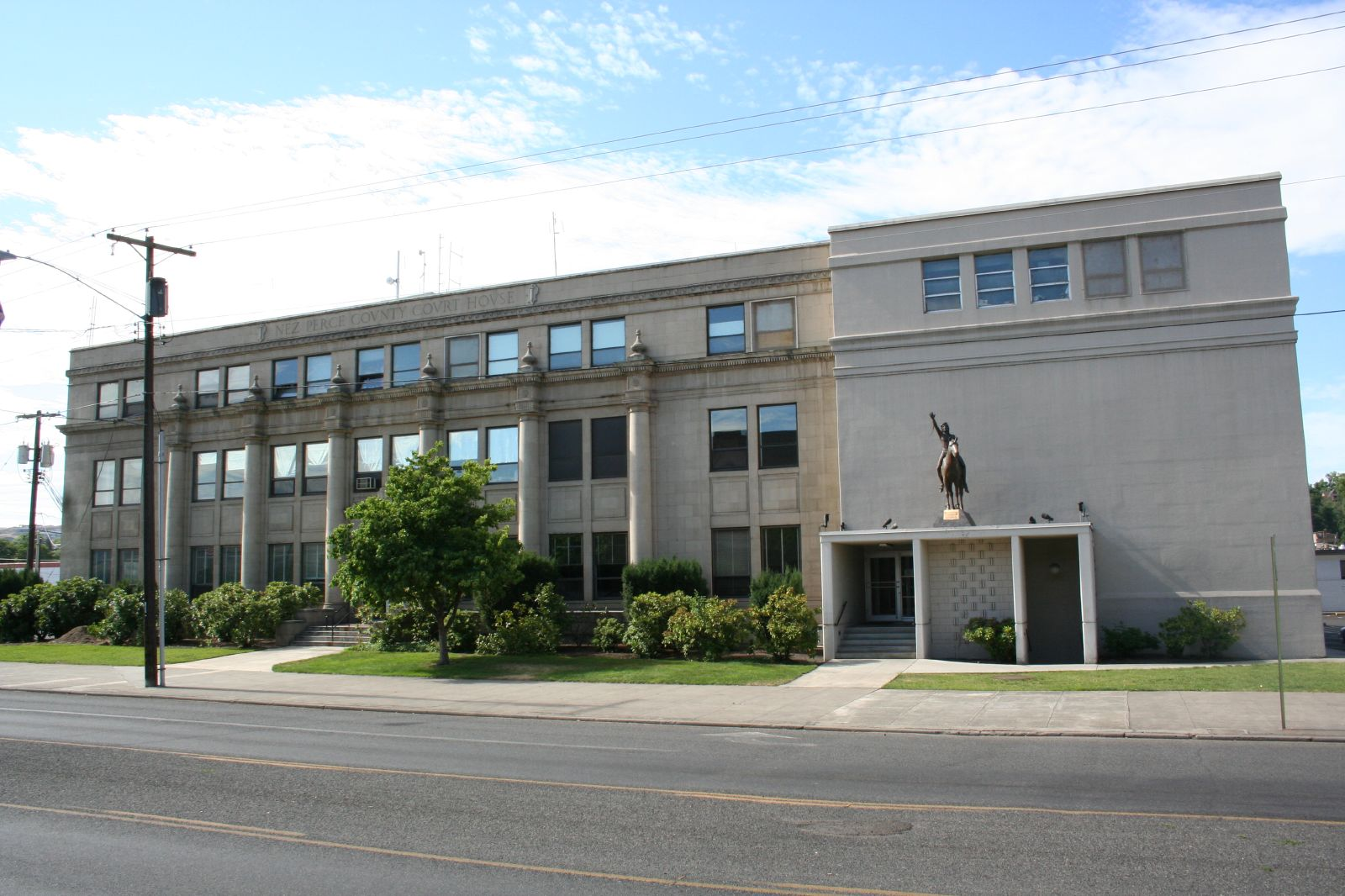
- Nez Perce County Courthouse in Lewiston, Idaho

- Seal

- Location within the U.S. state of Idaho
- Coordinates: 46°20′N 116°45′W
- Country: United States
- State: Idaho
- Founded: February 4, 1864
- Named for: Nez Percé tribe
- Seat: Lewiston
- Largest city: Lewiston

Area
  - Total: 856 sq mi (2,220 km^{2})
  - Land: 848 sq mi (2,200 km^{2})
  - Water: 8.2 sq mi (21 km^{2}) 0.85%

Population (2020)
  - Total: 42,090
  - Estimate (2025): 42,905 ▲
  - Density: 49.6/sq mi (19.2/km^{2})
- Time zone: UTC−8 (Pacific)
  - Summer (DST): UTC−7 (PDT)
- Congressional district: 1st
- Website: www.co.nezperce.id.us

Nez Perce County (/nɛz ˈpɜːrs/ nez PURS) is a county located in the U.S. state of Idaho. As of the 2020 United States census, the population was 42,090. The county seat is Lewiston. The county is named after the Native American Nez Perce tribe. Nez Perce County is part of the Lewiston, Idaho–WA Metropolitan Statistical Area.

== History ==
Nez Perce County was originally organized in 1861, when the area was part of Washington Territory. It was reorganized in 1864 by the Idaho Territorial Legislature and was later subdivided into new counties. Rapid migration to the Palouse in the 1880s led to the formation of Latah County in 1888. Isolated from its county seat of Wallace in the Silver Valley, the southern portion of Shoshone County was annexed by Nez Perce County in 1904, then became Clearwater County in 1911. Lewis County was also formed from Nez Perce County in 1911.

== Geography ==
According to the U.S. Census Bureau, the county has a total area of 856 square miles (2,220 km^{2}), of which 848 square miles (2,200 km^{2}) is land and 8.2 square miles (21 km^{2}) (1.0%) is water.

Nez Perce County has two rivers, the Clearwater and the Snake, which meet in Lewiston and then flow west. The Clearwater flows from the east and the Snake from the south, creating the state border with Washington (and further upstream, Oregon). The lowest point in the state of Idaho is located on the Snake River in Lewiston in Nez Perce County, where it flows out of Idaho and into Washington.

The northern portion of the county is part of the Palouse, a wide and rolling agricultural region of the middle Columbia basin.

=== Adjacent counties ===
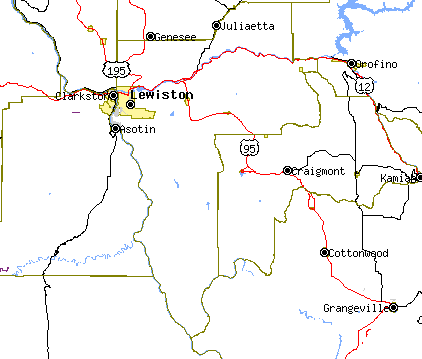
Nez Perce County map

- Latah County – north
- Clearwater County – northeast
- Lewis County – east
- Idaho County – southeast/Mountain Time Border
- Wallowa County, Oregon – southwest
- Asotin County, Washington – west
- Whitman County, Washington – northwest

=== Major highways ===
- US-12
- US-95
- US-195
- SH-3
- SH-128

=== National protected areas ===
- Clearwater National Forest (part)
- Nez Perce National Historical Park (part)
- Wallowa–Whitman National Forest (part)

== Government and politics ==
Nez Perce County is currently strongly Republican, though less so than southern Idaho: it is one of only nine counties (out of 44) in Idaho that has failed to vote Republican in every presidential election since 1968, and indeed supported Michael Dukakis and Bill Clinton (by plurality) three times in succession from 1988 to 1996.

In 2004 Republican George W. Bush defeated Democrat John Kerry 62% to 36%. In 2008 Republican John McCain defeated Democrat Barack Obama by a slightly smaller margin of 58.11 percent to 39.97 percent, a result almost exactly replicated by Mitt Romney in 2012. In 2016 Donald Trump increased the Republican majority to 62.2 percent as against Hillary Clinton's 28.1 percent.

United States presidential election results for Nez Perce County, Idaho
Year	Republican		Democratic		Third party(ies)	
Year	No.	%	No.	%	No.	%
1892	345	44.23%	0	0.00%	435	55.77%
1896	675	37.79%	1,089	60.97%	22	1.23%
1900	2,184	50.18%	2,168	49.82%	0	0.00%
1904	3,956	62.99%	1,696	27.01%	628	10.00%
1908	3,871	51.53%	2,843	37.85%	798	10.62%
1912	1,011	24.27%	1,619	38.86%	1,536	36.87%
1916	1,753	37.00%	2,675	56.46%	310	6.54%
1920	2,761	64.05%	1,548	35.91%	2	0.05%
1924	2,250	42.42%	1,212	22.85%	1,842	34.73%
1928	4,054	61.02%	2,535	38.15%	55	0.83%
1932	2,211	29.83%	5,077	68.50%	124	1.67%
1936	1,988	24.90%	5,705	71.45%	292	3.66%
1940	3,409	36.22%	5,963	63.35%	41	0.44%
1944	3,159	36.52%	5,453	63.05%	37	0.43%
1948	3,168	33.98%	5,747	61.65%	407	4.37%
1952	5,659	50.39%	5,552	49.43%	20	0.18%
1956	5,635	46.64%	6,448	53.36%	0	0.00%
1960	5,203	39.58%	7,944	60.42%	0	0.00%
1964	3,912	29.73%	9,245	70.27%	0	0.00%
1968	5,019	39.90%	6,502	51.69%	1,058	8.41%
1972	6,232	52.19%	5,081	42.55%	628	5.26%
1976	6,151	48.22%	6,324	49.58%	280	2.20%
1980	7,495	47.61%	6,565	41.70%	1,684	10.70%
1984	8,153	56.89%	5,981	41.74%	196	1.37%
1988	7,027	46.78%	7,754	51.62%	239	1.59%
1992	5,431	32.00%	7,069	41.65%	4,474	26.36%
1996	6,675	39.98%	7,491	44.87%	2,530	15.15%
2000	10,577	66.02%	4,995	31.18%	449	2.80%
2004	11,009	62.20%	6,476	36.59%	215	1.21%
2008	10,357	58.11%	7,123	39.97%	343	1.92%
2012	9,967	58.65%	6,451	37.96%	575	3.38%
2016	10,699	62.20%	4,828	28.07%	1,674	9.73%
2020	13,738	65.47%	6,686	31.86%	561	2.67%
2024	13,707	68.08%	5,928	29.44%	500	2.48%

== Demographics ==
Historical population
Census	Pop.	Note	%±
1870	1,607		—
1880	3,965		146.7%
1890	2,847		−28.2%
1900	13,748		382.9%
1910	24,860		80.8%
1920	15,253		−38.6%
1930	17,591		15.3%
1940	18,873		7.3%
1950	22,568		19.6%
1960	27,066		19.9%
1970	30,276		11.9%
1980	33,220		9.7%
1990	33,754		1.6%
2000	37,410		10.8%
2010	39,265		5.0%
2020	42,090		7.2%
2025 (est.)	42,905	▲	1.9%
U.S. Decennial Census; 1790–1960, 1900–1990, 1990–2000, 2010–2020 2020

=== Racial and ethnic composition ===
Nez Perce County, Idaho – Racial and ethnic composition Note: the US Census treats Hispanic/Latino as an ethnic category. This table excludes Latinos from the racial categories and assigns them to a separate category. Hispanics/Latinos may be of any race.
Race / Ethnicity (NH = Non-Hispanic)	Pop 1980	Pop 1990	Pop 2000	Pop 2010	Pop 2020	% 1980	% 1990	% 2000	% 2010	% 2020
White alone (NH)	31,362	31,456	33,880	34,835	35,436	94.41%	93.19%	90.56%	88.72%	84.19%
Black or African American alone (NH)	53	45	101	112	184	0.16%	0.13%	0.27%	0.29%	0.44%
Native American or Alaska Native alone (NH)	1,394	1,623	1,908	2,074	2,336	4.20%	4.81%	5.10%	5.28%	5.55%
Asian alone (NH)	111	207	244	277	324	0.33%	0.61%	0.65%	0.71%	0.77%
Native Hawaiian or Pacific Islander alone (NH)	x	x	24	35	32	x	x	0.06%	0.09%	0.08%
Other race alone (NH)	23	4	23	13	126	0.07%	0.01%	0.06%	0.03%	0.30%
Mixed race or Multiracial (NH)	x	x	509	810	2,022	x	x	1.36%	2.06%	4.80%
Hispanic or Latino (any race)	277	419	721	1,109	1,630	0.83%	1.24%	1.93%	2.82%	3.87%
Total	33,220	33,754	37,410	39,265	42,090	100.00%	100.00%	100.00%	100.00%	100.00%

=== 2020 census ===
As of the 2020 census, the county had a population of 42,090. The median age was 40.9 years. 21.5% of residents were under the age of 18 and 21.1% of residents were 65 years of age or older. For every 100 females there were 96.5 males, and for every 100 females age 18 and over there were 95.0 males age 18 and over.

The racial makeup of the county was 85.8% White, 0.5% Black or African American, 5.8% American Indian and Alaska Native, 0.8% Asian, 0.1% Native Hawaiian and Pacific Islander, 1.0% from some other race, and 6.1% from two or more races. Hispanic or Latino residents of any race comprised 3.9% of the population.

81.1% of residents lived in urban areas, while 18.9% lived in rural areas.

There were 17,231 households in the county, of which 27.5% had children under the age of 18 living with them and 25.2% had a female householder with no spouse or partner present. About 29.6% of all households were made up of individuals and 13.8% had someone living alone who was 65 years of age or older.

There were 18,364 housing units, of which 6.2% were vacant. Among occupied housing units, 68.8% were owner-occupied and 31.2% were renter-occupied. The homeowner vacancy rate was 0.7% and the rental vacancy rate was 4.9%.

=== 2010 census ===
As of the 2010 United States census, there were 39,265 people, 16,241 households, and 10,331 families living in the county. The population density was 46.3 inhabitants per square mile (17.9/km^{2}). There were 17,438 housing units at an average density of 20.6 per square mile (8.0/km^{2}). The racial makeup of the county was 90.1% white, 5.6% American Indian, 0.7% Asian, 0.3% black or African American, 0.1% Pacific islander, 0.7% from other races, and 2.5% from two or more races. Those of Hispanic or Latino origin made up 2.8% of the population. In terms of ancestry, 30.6% were German, 14.5% were Irish, 13.5% were English, and 7.7% were American.

Of the 16,241 households, 28.1% had children under the age of 18 living with them, 48.8% were married couples living together, 10.3% had a female householder with no husband present, 36.4% were non-families, and 28.6% of all households were made up of individuals. The average household size was 2.36 and the average family size was 2.88. The median age was 40.8 years.

The median income for a household in the county was $44,395 and the median income for a family was $55,180. Males had a median income of $42,451 versus $31,920 for females. The per capita income for the county was $23,899. About 8.5% of families and 11.6% of the population were below the poverty line, including 16.2% of those under age 18 and 5.9% of those age 65 or over.

=== 2000 census ===
As of the census of 2000, there were 37,410 people, 15,286 households, and 10,149 families living in the county. The population density was 44 inhabitants per square mile (17/km^{2}). There were 16,203 housing units at an average density of 19 per square mile (7.3/km^{2}). The racial makeup of the county was 91.58% White, 0.28% Black or African American, 5.31% Native American, 0.65% Asian, 0.07% Pacific Islander, 0.50% from other races, and 1.60% from two or more races. 1.93% of the population were Hispanic or Latino of any race. 25.1% were of German, 11.3% English, 11.0% American, 8.9% Irish and 5.6% Norwegian ancestry.

There were 15,286 households, out of which 29.00% had children under the age of 18 living with them, 52.80% were married couples living together, 9.30% had a female householder with no husband present, and 33.60% were non-families. 26.70% of all households were made up of individuals, and 11.30% had someone living alone who was 65 years of age or older. The average household size was 2.40 and the average family size was 2.90.

In the county, the population was spread out, with 23.80% under the age of 18, 10.00% from 18 to 24, 26.70% from 25 to 44, 23.00% from 45 to 64, and 16.50% who were 65 years of age or older. The median age was 38 years. For every 100 females, there were 96.70 males. For every 100 females age 18 and over, there were 93.80 males.

The median income for a household in the county was $36,282, and the median income for a family was $44,212. Males had a median income of $34,688 versus $23,014 for females. The per capita income for the county was $18,544. About 8.60% of families and 12.20% of the population were below the poverty line, including 15.40% of those under age 18 and 6.70% of those age 65 or over.

== Communities ==
=== Cities ===
- Culdesac
- Lapwai
- Lewiston (county seat)
- Peck

=== Census-designated place ===
- Sweetwater

=== Unincorporated communities ===
- Gifford
- Jacques
- Lenore
- Myrtle
- Southwick
- Spalding
- Waha

== See also ==
- List of Idaho counties
- National Register of Historic Places listings in Nez Perce County, Idaho
