= Greencreek, Idaho =

Unincorporated community in Idaho, United States

- Unincorporated community
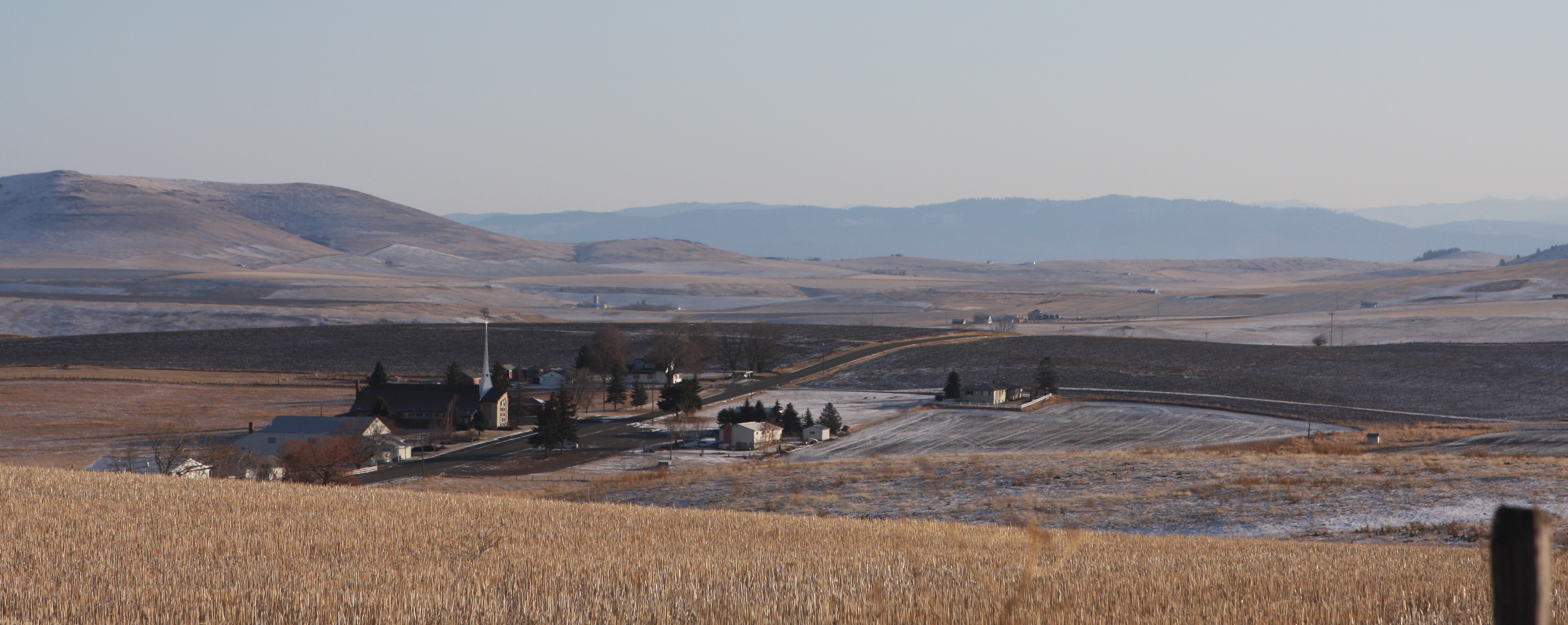
- Greencreek in late fall/early winter 2009

- Location within Idaho Location within the United States
- Coordinates: 46°06′26″N 116°15′52″W
- Country: United States
- State: Idaho
- County: Idaho
- Elevation: 3,189 ft (972 m)
- Time zone: UTC-8 (Pacific (PST))
  - Summer (DST): UTC-7 (PDT)
- ZIP code: 83533
- Area codes: 208, 986
- GNIS feature ID: 372923

Greencreek is an unincorporated community in Idaho County, Idaho, United States, 5.5 miles (8.9 km) northeast of Cottonwood.

== History ==
Founded in the 1800s, Greencreek's population was estimated at 50 in 1960.

== Description ==
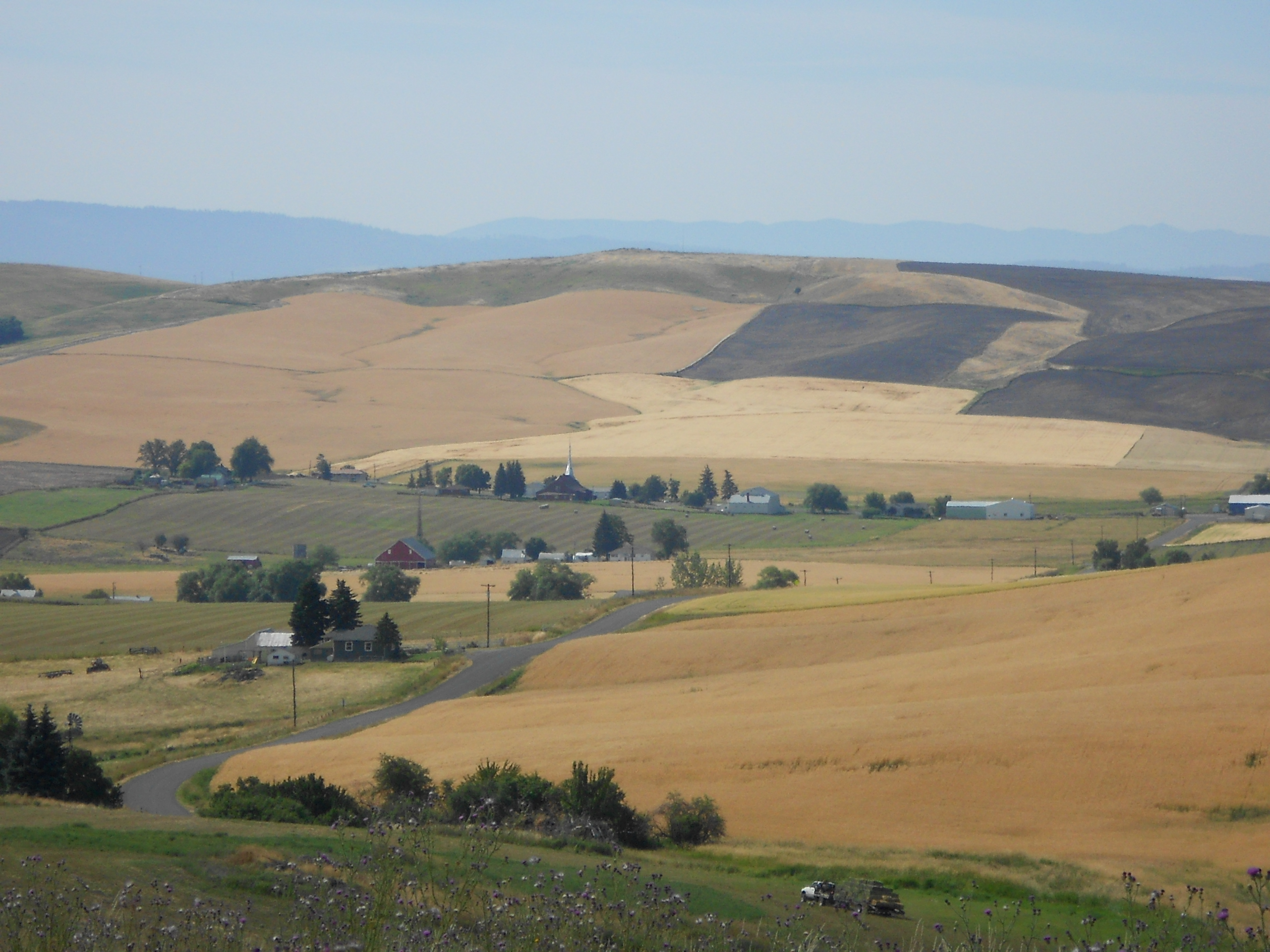
Greencreek, August 2011

Greencreek does not have a post office, but has its own ZIP code 83533. Greencreek's elevation is 3189 feet. It is approximately 5.5 miles east of U.S. 95. The town is approximately .4 miles in length and has one "T" intersection in the middle of town.

The Greencreek Community Hall has an elected board that serves to oversee the operations and maintenance of the facility. There is a Catholic church in Greencreek known as Saint Anthony's Parish. As part of the parish there is still an active group called the "Saint Anthony's Society" that serves as a governing board for the church as well as providing community service projects, most notably the Greencreek Fourth of July celebration.

Greencreek also has a 4-H club called the Greencreek Active Workers. It is the oldest active 4-H club in Idaho County. Greencreek's primary industry is agriculture; however other small businesses do exist in the area. Greencreek is located in the Cottonwood School District #242.
