= Nezperce, Idaho =

Nezperce
- City
- Location of Nezperce in Lewis County, Idaho.
- Coordinates: 46°14′02″N 116°14′26″W
- Country: United States
- State: Idaho
- County: Lewis

Area
  - Total: 0.43 sq mi (1.11 km^{2})
  - Land: 0.43 sq mi (1.11 km^{2})
  - Water: 0 sq mi (0.00 km^{2})
- Elevation: 3,215 ft (980 m)

Population (2020)
  - Total: 458
  - Density: 1,067.0/sq mi (411.98/km^{2})
- Time zone: UTC-8 (Pacific (PST))
  - Summer (DST): UTC-7 (PDT)
- ZIP code: 83543
- Area code: 208
- FIPS code: 16-57250
- GNIS feature ID: 2411252
- Website: www.cityofnezperce.gov

Nezperce is a city in and the county seat of Lewis County, Idaho, United States. As of the 2020 census, Nezperce had a population of 458. Nezperce is named for the local Nez Perce tribe of Native Americans. ("Nezperce" derives from a corruption of the French words nez percé, literally "pierced nose.") There is one school district, Nezperce School District #302.

== Geography ==
According to the United States Census Bureau, the city has a total area of 0.40 square miles (1.04 km^{2}), all of it land.

Nezperce is located on the Camas Prairie. Idaho State Highways 64, 62 and 162 have a junction in Nezperce.

=== Climate ===
According to the Köppen climate classification system, Nezperce has a humid continental climate (Köppen Dfb).

Climate data for Nezperce, Idaho (1991–2020 normals, extremes 1951–2020)
Month	Jan	Feb	Mar	Apr	May	Jun	Jul	Aug	Sep	Oct	Nov	Dec	Year
Record high °F (°C)	61 (16)	67 (19)	76 (24)	87 (31)	90 (32)	100 (38)	103 (39)	106 (41)	97 (36)	86 (30)	73 (23)	59 (15)	106 (41)
Mean daily maximum °F (°C)	35.3 (1.8)	39.9 (4.4)	46.9 (8.3)	53.7 (12.1)	62.4 (16.9)	68.4 (20.2)	79.8 (26.6)	80.7 (27.1)	71.3 (21.8)	56.5 (13.6)	42.4 (5.8)	33.9 (1.1)	55.9 (13.3)
Daily mean °F (°C)	28.6 (−1.9)	31.8 (−0.1)	37.2 (2.9)	43.1 (6.2)	50.6 (10.3)	56.0 (13.3)	63.8 (17.7)	64.2 (17.9)	56.4 (13.6)	45.0 (7.2)	34.8 (1.6)	27.6 (−2.4)	44.9 (7.2)
Mean daily minimum °F (°C)	21.9 (−5.6)	23.6 (−4.7)	27.6 (−2.4)	32.5 (0.3)	38.8 (3.8)	43.7 (6.5)	47.8 (8.8)	47.6 (8.7)	41.5 (5.3)	33.5 (0.8)	27.2 (−2.7)	21.2 (−6.0)	33.9 (1.1)
Record low °F (°C)	−20 (−29)	−19 (−28)	−10 (−23)	15 (−9)	18 (−8)	29 (−2)	31 (−1)	25 (−4)	18 (−8)	0 (−18)	−13 (−25)	−33 (−36)	−33 (−36)
Average precipitation inches (mm)	1.77 (45)	1.43 (36)	2.02 (51)	2.38 (60)	2.70 (69)	2.21 (56)	0.87 (22)	0.78 (20)	0.95 (24)	1.53 (39)	1.77 (45)	1.55 (39)	19.96 (507)
Average snowfall inches (cm)	7.4 (19)	5.6 (14)	3.6 (9.1)	1.0 (2.5)	0.0 (0.0)	0.0 (0.0)	0.0 (0.0)	0.0 (0.0)	0.0 (0.0)	0.1 (0.25)	2.8 (7.1)	8.4 (21)	28.9 (73)
Average precipitation days (≥ 0.01 in)	10.0	9.4	11.5	12.1	11.2	9.0	4.4	4.6	5.2	8.6	11.2	9.9	107.1
Average snowy days (≥ 0.1 in)	5.2	4.2	2.5	0.9	0.1	0.0	0.0	0.0	0.0	0.2	2.2	5.7	21.0
Source: NOAA

== Demographics ==
Historical population
Census	Pop.	Note	%±
1910	599		—
1920	677		13.0%
1930	444		−34.4%
1940	590		32.9%
1950	543		−8.0%
1960	667		22.8%
1970	555		−16.8%
1980	517		−6.8%
1990	453		−12.4%
2000	523		15.5%
2010	466		−10.9%
2020	458		−1.7%
2019 (est.)	458		−1.7%
U.S. Decennial Census

Nezperce has a municipal airport, primarily used by cropdusters and light aircraft. The asphalt runway is 2,450 feet long, 30 feet wide, unlighted and has numerous obstructions. See airport/facility directory for more information.

=== 2010 census ===
As of the census of 2010, there were 466 people, 191 households, and 130 families residing in the city. The population density was 1,165.0 inhabitants per square mile (449.8/km^{2}). There were 213 housing units at an average density of 532.5 per square mile (205.6/km^{2}). The racial makeup of the city was 95.1% White, 4.1% Native American, 0.2% Asian, and 0.6% from two or more races. Hispanic or Latino of any race were 0.6% of the population.

There were 191 households, of which 26.2% had children under the age of 18 living with them, 59.2% were married couples living together, 6.3% had a female householder with no husband present, 2.6% had a male householder with no wife present, and 31.9% were non-families. 28.3% of all households were made up of individuals, and 16.7% had someone living alone who was 65 years of age or older. The average household size was 2.36 and the average family size was 2.84.

The median age in the city was 48.2 years. 21.2% of residents were under the age of 18; 7.5% were between the ages of 18 and 24; 16.5% were from 25 to 44; 31.8% were from 45 to 64; and 23% were 65 years of age or older. The gender makeup of the city was 50.4% male and 49.6% female.

=== 2000 census ===
As of the census of 2000, there were 523 people, 197 households, and 150 families residing in the city. The population density was 1,283.7 inhabitants per square mile (495.6/km^{2}). There were 225 housing units at an average density of 552.3 per square mile (213.2/km^{2}). The racial makeup of the city was 91.20% White, 1.34% African American, 1.91% Native American, 1.34% Asian, 0.76% from other races, and 3.44% from two or more races. Hispanic or Latino of any race were 0.76% of the population.

There were 197 households, out of which 33.5% had children under the age of 18 living with them, 67.5% were married couples living together, and 23.4% were non-families. 22.3% of all households were made up of individuals, and 12.7% had someone living alone who was 65 years of age or older. The average household size was 2.61 and the average family size was 3.05.

In the city, the population was spread out, with 29.8% under the age of 18, 4.2% from 18 to 24, 20.8% from 25 to 44, 24.7% from 45 to 64, and 20.5% who were 65 years of age or older. The median age was 42 years. For every 100 females, there were 107.5 males. For every 100 females age 18 and over, there were 99.5 males.

The median income for a household in the city was $36,094, and the median income for a family was $40,000. Males had a median income of $30,625 versus $21,094 for females. The per capita income for the city was $15,450. About 5.7% of families and 7.4% of the population were below the poverty line, including 11.1% of those under age 18 and 3.3% of those age 65 or over.

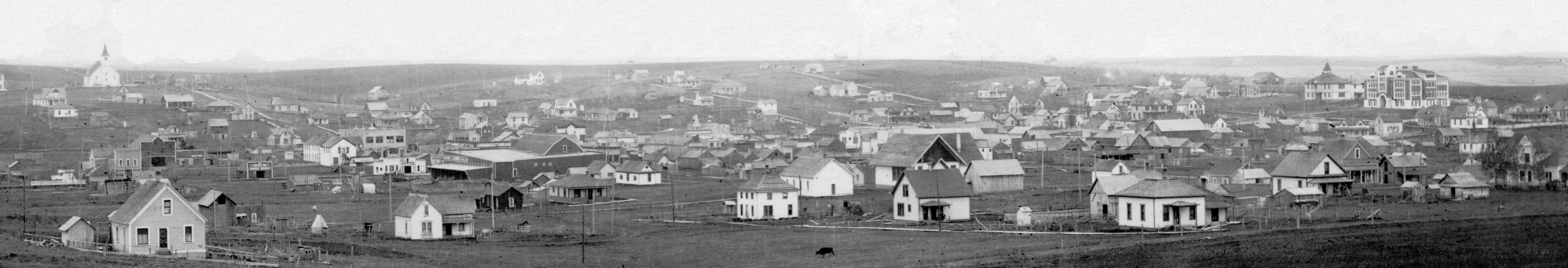
Nezperce, circa 1910

== See also ==
- List of cities in Idaho
