= Culdesac, Idaho =

- City
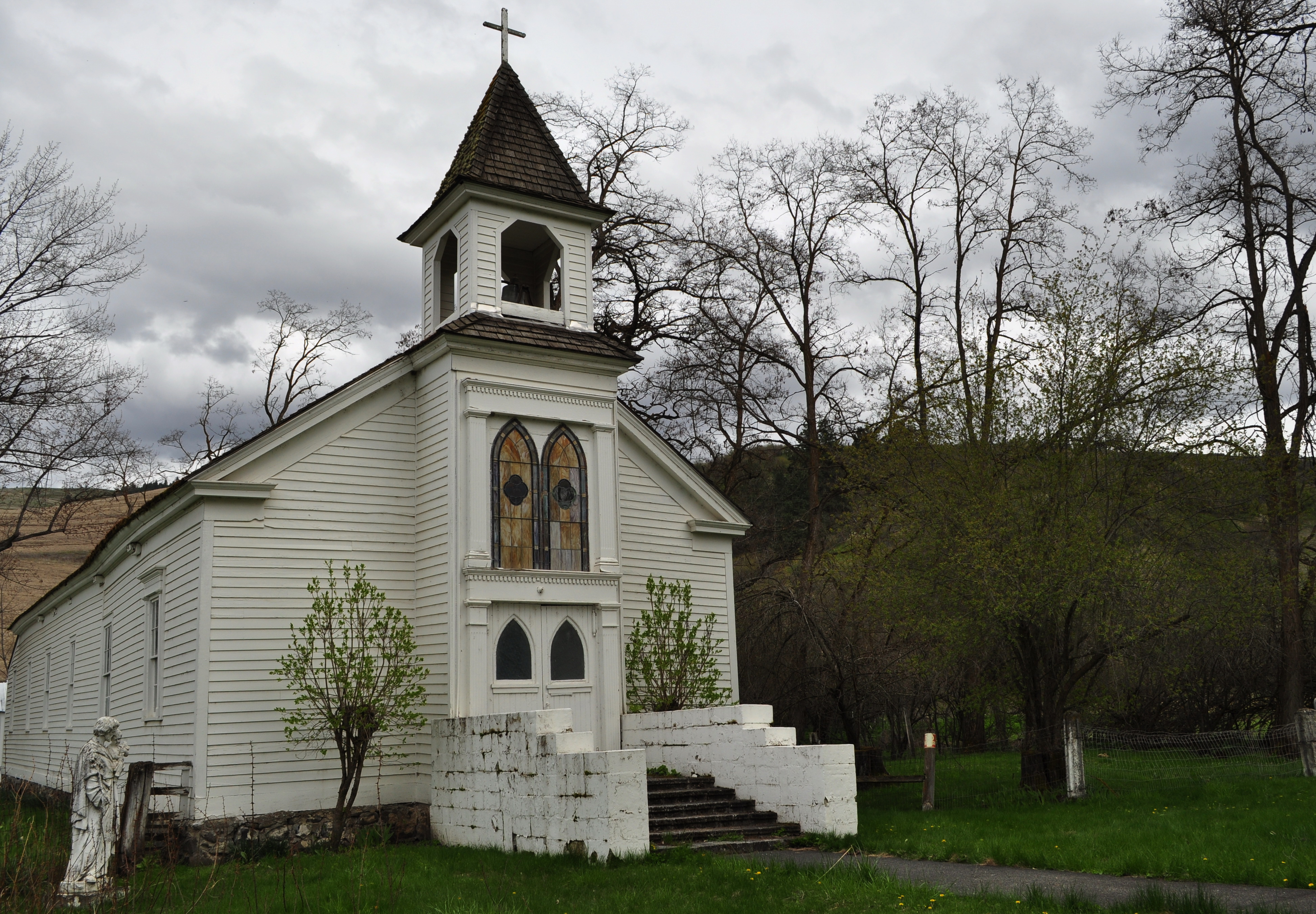
- St. Joseph's Mission

- Location of Culdesac in Nez Perce County, Idaho.
- Coordinates: 46°22′30″N 116°40′13″W
- Country: United States
- State: Idaho
- County: Nez Perce

Area
  - Total: 0.22 sq mi (0.58 km^{2})
  - Land: 0.22 sq mi (0.58 km^{2})
  - Water: 0 sq mi (0.00 km^{2})
- Elevation: 1,644 ft (501 m)

Population (2020)
  - Total: 413
  - Estimate (2019): 383
  - Density: 1,719.7/sq mi (663.98/km^{2})
- Time zone: UTC-8 (Pacific (PST))
  - Summer (DST): UTC-7 (PDT)
- ZIP code: 83524
- Area codes: 208, 986
- FIPS code: 16-19900
- GNIS feature ID: 0396352

Culdesac is a city in Nez Perce County, Idaho, United States. As of the 2020 census, Culdesac had a population of 413. It is part of the Lewiston, ID-WA Metropolitan Statistical Area.

== History ==
Culdesac was named from its location at the end of a railroad line, i.e., a cul de sac.

== Geography ==
According to the United States Census Bureau, the city has a total area of 0.23 square miles (0.60 km^{2}), all of it land.

== Demographics ==
Historical population
| Census | Pop. | Note | %± |
|---|---|---|---|
| 1910 | 436 | | — |
| 1920 | 397 | | −8.9% |
| 1930 | 287 | | −27.7% |
| 1940 | 219 | | −23.7% |
| 1950 | 175 | | −20.1% |
| 1960 | 209 | | 19.4% |
| 1970 | 211 | | 1.0% |
| 1980 | 261 | | 23.7% |
| 1990 | 280 | | 7.3% |
| 2000 | 378 | | 35.0% |
| 2010 | 380 | | 0.5% |
| 2020 | 413 | | 8.7% |
| 2019 (est.) | 383 | | 0.8% |
U.S. Decennial Census

=== 2010 census ===
At the 2010 census there were 380 people in 156 households, including 106 families, in the city. The population density was 1,652.2 inhabitants per square mile (637.9/km^{2}). There were 176 housing units at an average density of 765.2 per square mile (295.4/km^{2}). The racial makup of the city was 83.4% White, 15.8% Native American, 0.3% from other races, and 0.5% from two or more races. Hispanic or Latino of any race were 5.3%.

Of the 156 households 32.7% had children under the age of 18 living with them, 43.6% were married couples living together, 14.7% had a female householder with no husband present, 9.6% had a male householder with no wife present, and 32.1% were non-families. 25.0% of households were one person and 11.5% were one person aged 65 or older. The average household size was 2.44 and the average family size was 2.85.

The median age was 41 years. 22.9% of residents were under the age of 18; 8.2% were between the ages of 18 and 24; 23.2% were from 25 to 44; 30% were from 45 to 64; and 15.8% were 65 or older. The gender makeup of the city was 50.0% male and 50.0% female.

=== 2000 census ===
At the 2000 census there were 378 people in 152 households, including 107 families, in the city. The population density was 1,601.4 inhabitants per square mile (618.3/km^{2}). There were 171 housing units at an average density of 724.5 per square mile (279.7/km^{2}). The racial makup of the city was 94.44% White, 0.53% African American, 2.65% Native American, 0.26% Pacific Islander, 0.26% from other races, and 1.85% from two or more races. Hispanic or Latino of any race were 1.59%.

Of the 152 households 34.2% had children under the age of 18 living with them, 53.3% were married couples living together, 9.9% had a female householder with no husband present, and 29.6% were non-families. 25.7% of households were one person and 10.5% were one person aged 65 or older. The average household size was 2.49 and the average family size was 2.98.

The age distribution was 28.3% under the age of 18, 5.8% from 18 to 24, 26.7% from 25 to 44, 26.2% from 45 to 64, and 13.0% 65 or older. The median age was 37 years. For every 100 females, there were 100.0 males. For every 100 females age 18 and over, there were 90.8 males.

The median household income was $25,750 and the median family income was $31,364. Males had a median income of $27,500 versus $22,083 for females. The per capita income for the city was $11,888. About 14.4% of families and 16.4% of the population were below the poverty line, including 13.0% of those under age 18 and none of those age 65 or over.

== See also ==
- List of cities in Idaho
- U.S. Route 95 in Idaho
