= Kamiah, Idaho =

- City
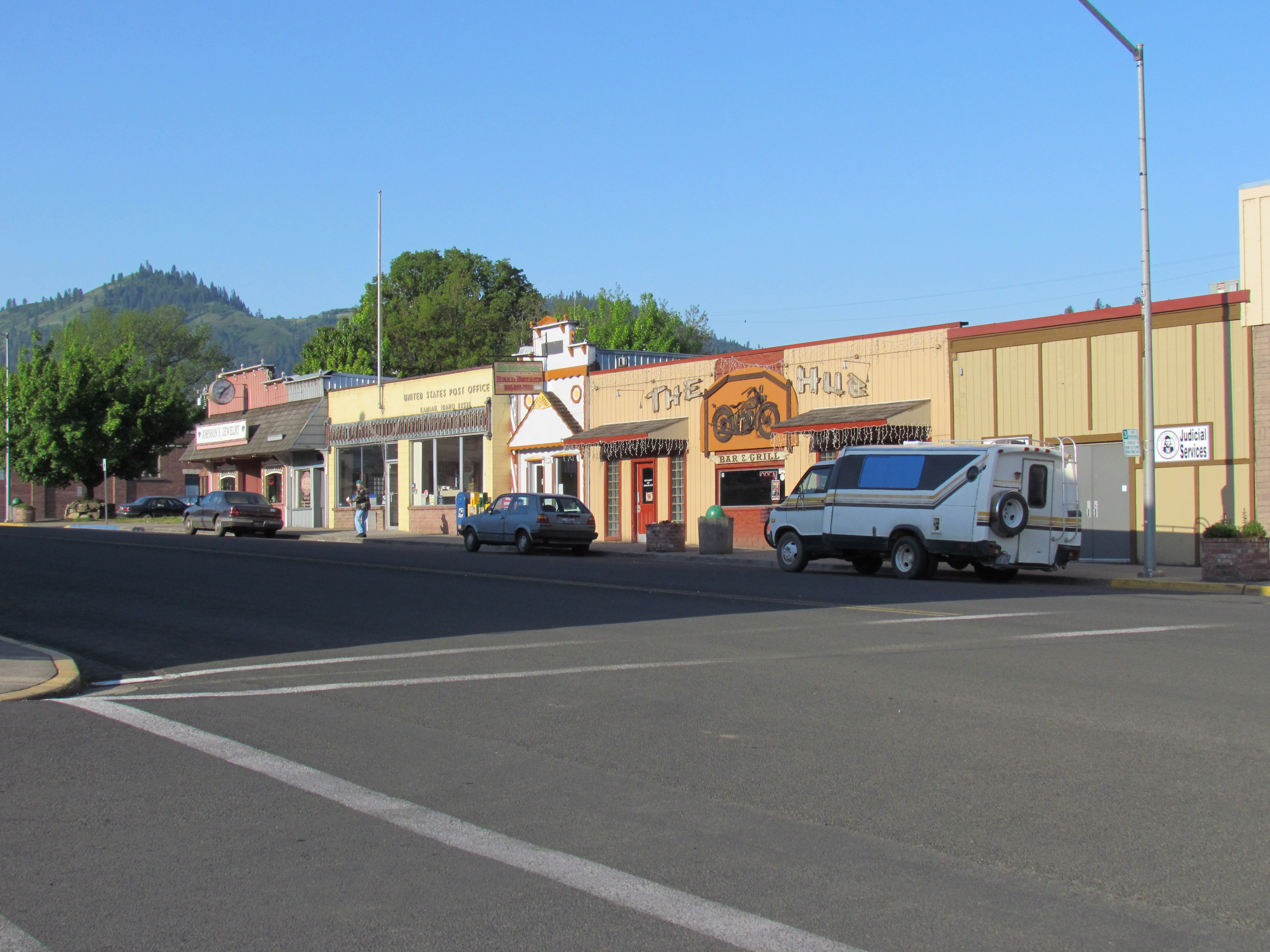
- Main Street in May 2012

- Location of Kamiah in Lewis County and Idaho County, Idaho.
- Coordinates: 46°13′37″N 116°01′42″W
- Country: United States
- State: Idaho
- Counties: Lewis (& Idaho)

Area
  - Total: 1.19 sq mi (3.07 km^{2})
  - Land: 1.10 sq mi (2.84 km^{2})
  - Water: 0.085 sq mi (0.22 km^{2})
- Elevation: 1,243 ft (379 m)

Population (2020)
  - Total: 1,117
  - Density: 1,133.1/sq mi (437.49/km^{2})
- Time zone: UTC-8 (Pacific (PST))
  - Summer (DST): UTC-7 (PDT)
- ZIP code: 83536
- Area code: 208
- FIPS code: 16-42400
- GNIS feature ID: 2410163
- Website: cityofkamiah.org

Kamiah (/ˈkæmi.aɪ/ KAM-ee-eye) is a city in Lewis and Idaho counties in the U.S. state of Idaho. The largest city in Lewis County, it extends only a small distance into Idaho County, south of Lawyer Creek. As of the 2020 census, Kamiah had a population of 1,117. The city lies in the narrow valley of the Clearwater River; downstream are Orofino and Lewiston, at the confluence with the Snake River.

== History ==
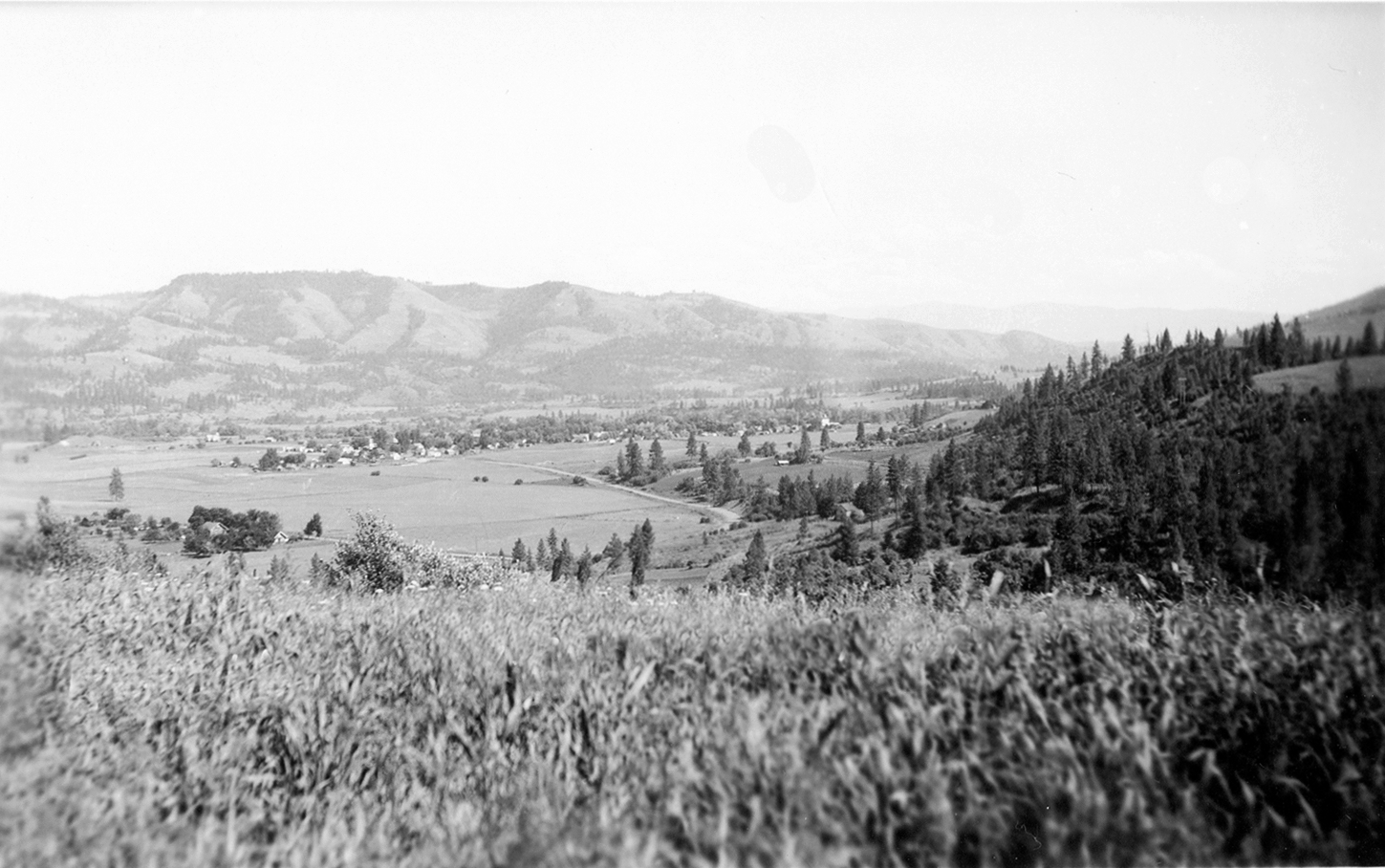
Kamiah, circa 1950

The Kamiah area has been inhabited by the Nez Perce for centuries. The name "Kamiah" is Nez Perce for "many rope litters," as Nez Perce manufactured "Kamia" ropes in the area to fish steelhead. Also according to Nez Perce tradition, the Appaloosa horse was first bred in the area.

On their return trip east, the Lewis and Clark Expedition camped in the Kamiah area for several weeks during the spring of 1806, waiting for snows to melt.

Kamiah is the character name of the Nez Perce/Blackfoot woman in Across the Wide Missouri, a 1951 'mountain men' film set in the 1830s. Similar in fame to Sacagawea of the Lewis & Clark expedition, Kamiah led her associated mountain men's troop over the Bitterroot Range to her homeland (Three Forks, Montana for Sacagawea).

Hohots Ilppilp was the leader around Kamiah from at least the time of Lewis and Clark until the 1840s. When the first leader for all the Nez Perce was appointed, it was Hohots Ilppilp's grandson Ellis who lived in this area and maintained large herds of sheep, cattle and over a thousand horses.

Kamiah is within the Nez Perce Indian Reservation. Similar to the opening of lands in Oklahoma, the U.S. government opened the reservation for white settlement 131 years ago in November 1895. The proclamation had been signed less than two weeks earlier by President Cleveland.

== Geography ==
According to the United States Census Bureau, the city has a total area of 1.17 square miles (3.03 km^{2}), of which 1.08 square miles (2.80 km^{2}) is land and 0.09 square miles (0.23 km^{2}) is water.

The city is located at the confluence of Lawyer Creek and the Clearwater River on the left bank of the latter. In the Kamiah area, the Lewis-Idaho County line follows Lawyer Creek to its confluence with the Clearwater, and then turns to follow the Clearwater. U.S. Route 12 passes through Kamiah, crossing from the right to left bank of the Clearwater at the city. The two streams cut deep and narrow valleys through the otherwise relatively flat, rolling Camas Prairie region that surrounds Kamiah. The city is located at 1,250 feet above sea level, but elevations of over 2,800 feet on the prairie lie within three miles of Kamiah.

In addition to U.S. Route 12, transportation links to Kamiah are provided by Idaho State Highway 64 and Idaho State Highway 162.

=== Climate ===
According to the Köppen climate classification system, Kamiah has a hot-summer continental climate (Köppen Dfa).

Climate data for Kamiah (1913-2012)
Month	Jan	Feb	Mar	Apr	May	Jun	Jul	Aug	Sep	Oct	Nov	Dec	Year
Record high °F (°C)	59 (15)	66 (19)	81 (27)	88 (31)	98 (37)	104 (40)	107 (42)	110 (43)	103 (39)	89 (32)	72 (22)	58 (14)	110 (43)
Mean daily maximum °F (°C)	39 (4)	47.7 (8.7)	55.3 (12.9)	64.1 (17.8)	72.9 (22.7)	79.3 (26.3)	93.2 (34.0)	91.6 (33.1)	81.2 (27.3)	62.5 (16.9)	45.6 (7.6)	36.1 (2.3)	64 (18)
Mean daily minimum °F (°C)	26.4 (−3.1)	27.7 (−2.4)	31.4 (−0.3)	35.9 (2.2)	41.4 (5.2)	48.9 (9.4)	53.6 (12.0)	51.3 (10.7)	45.1 (7.3)	37 (3)	31.2 (−0.4)	24.7 (−4.1)	37.9 (3.3)
Record low °F (°C)	−5 (−21)	2 (−17)	10 (−12)	22 (−6)	27 (−3)	32 (0)	38 (3)	36 (2)	26 (−3)	12 (−11)	4 (−16)	−3 (−19)	−5 (−21)
Average precipitation inches (mm)	2.1 (53)	1.64 (42)	2.17 (55)	2.45 (62)	2.49 (63)	2.36 (60)	0.82 (21)	0.9 (23)	1.33 (34)	1.94 (49)	2.41 (61)	2.04 (52)	22.63 (575)
Average snowfall inches (cm)	6.1 (15)	1.9 (4.8)	0.9 (2.3)	0.1 (0.25)	0 (0)	0 (0)	0 (0)	0 (0)	0 (0)	0 (0)	0.9 (2.3)	5.4 (14)	15.3 (39)
Average precipitation days	12	10	12	12	11	10	4	5	6	9	13	12	116
Source: WRCC

== Demographics ==
Historical population
Census	Pop.	Note	%±
1910	324		—
1920	653		101.5%
1930	487		−25.4%
1940	568		16.6%
1950	812		43.0%
1960	1,245		53.3%
1970	1,307		5.0%
1980	1,478		13.1%
1990	1,157		−21.7%
2000	1,160		0.3%
2010	1,295		11.6%
2020	1,117		−13.7%
U.S. Decennial Census

=== 2020 census ===
As of the 2020 census, Kamiah had a population of 1,117. The median age was 50.1 years. 18.6% of residents were under the age of 18 and 30.8% were 65 years of age or older. For every 100 females there were 97.3 males, and for every 100 females age 18 and over there were 92.6 males age 18 and over.

0.0% of residents lived in urban areas, while 100.0% lived in rural areas.

There were 535 households, of which 19.8% had children under the age of 18 living in them. Of all households, 36.8% were married-couple households, 24.3% were households with a male householder and no spouse or partner present, and 33.5% were households with a female householder and no spouse or partner present. About 42.8% of all households were made up of individuals and 26.2% had someone living alone who was 65 years of age or older.

There were 601 housing units, of which 11.0% were vacant. The homeowner vacancy rate was 2.9% and the rental vacancy rate was 4.8%.

Racial composition as of the 2020 census
Race	Number	Percent
White	931	83.3%
Black or African American	1	0.1%
American Indian and Alaska Native	81	7.3%
Asian	3	0.3%
Native Hawaiian and Other Pacific Islander	0	0.0%
Some other race	22	2.0%
Two or more races	79	7.1%
Hispanic or Latino (of any race)	58	5.2%

=== 2010 census ===
As of the census of 2010, there were 1,295 people, 596 households, and 325 families residing in the city. The population density was 1,199.1 inhabitants per square mile (463.0/km^{2}). There were 642 housing units at an average density of 594.4 units per square mile (229.5 units/km^{2}). The racial makeup of the city was 82.2% White, 0.4% African American, 8.9% Native American, 0.7% Asian, 0.3% Pacific Islander, 3.7% from other races, and 3.9% from two or more races. Hispanic or Latino of any race were 5.5% of the population.

There were 596 households, of which 25.0% had children under the age of 18 living with them, 39.1% were married couples living together, 9.6% had a female householder with no husband present, 5.9% had a male householder with no wife present, and 45.5% were non-families. 39.9% of all households were made up of individuals, and 22.1% had someone living alone who was 65 years of age or older. The average household size was 2.17 and the average family size was 2.91.

The median age in the city was 45.7 years. 23.9% of residents were under the age of 18; 5.7% were between the ages of 18 and 24; 19.7% were from 25 to 44; 26.7% were from 45 to 64; and 24% were 65 years of age or older. The gender makeup of the city was 48.3% male and 51.7% female.

=== 2000 census ===
As of the census of 2000, there were 1,160 people, 531 households, and 302 families residing in the city. The population density was 1,050.8 inhabitants per square mile (405.7/km^{2}). There were 607 housing units at an average density of 549.8 units per square mile (212.3 units/km^{2}). The racial makeup of the city was 88.88% White, 0.26% African American, 8.02% Native American, 0.34% Asian, 0.09% Pacific Islander, 1.47% from other races, and 0.95% from two or more races. Hispanic or Latino of any race were 4.14% of the population.

There were 531 households, out of which 22.2% had children under the age of 18 living with them, 44.6% were married couples living together, 9.2% had a female householder with no husband present, and 43.1% were non-families. 38.4% of all households were made up of individuals, and 23.5% had someone living alone who was 65 years of age or older. The average household size was 2.17 and the average family size was 2.87.

In the city, the population was spread out, with 24.0% under the age of 18, 6.0% from 18 to 24, 20.9% from 25 to 44, 26.1% from 45 to 64, and 23.0% who were 65 years of age or older. The median age was 44 years. For every 100 females, there were 88.0 males. For every 100 females age 18 and over, there were 83.8 males.

The median income for a household in the city was $21,793, and the median income for a family was $33,424. Males had a median income of $25,982 versus $19,688 for females. The per capita income for the city was $14,111. About 12.5% of families and 18.5% of the population were below the poverty line, including 22.6% of those under age 18 and 12.2% of those age 65 or over.

== Economy ==
The city's largest employer was the Three Rivers Timber sawmill, which employed 108 before its closure in late 2008. After nearly two years, the mill was sold and restarted in August 2010 as Blue North Forest Products.

== Notable people ==
- Chief Lawyer, Nez Perce leader, is buried at Nikesa Cemetery in East Kamiah
- Ken Hobart, former CFL quarterback, graduated from Kamiah High School in 1979
- Jeff Krogh, racing driver
- Mark Krogh, racing driver
