= Timeline of Utah history =

Coordinates: 39.3055°N 111.6703°W

This timeline is a chronology of significant events in the history of the U.S. State of Utah and the historical area now occupied by the state.

2000s 1900s 1800s Statehood Territory 1700s 1600s 1500s Before 1492

== 2020s ==
| Year | Date | Event |
|---|---|---|
| 2020 | November 3 | In the 2020 General Election, Utah voters elect six U.S. Presidential Electors for President Donald Trump, elect Spencer Cox as Governor, elect Blake Moore as U.S. Representative for Utah's 1st Congressional District and Burgess Owens for Utah's 4th Congressional District, and re-elect Chris Stewart and John Curtis. Republicans retain control of the Utah Legislature. |
| 2020 | April 1 | The 2020 United States census enumerates the population of the State of Utah, estimated to be about 3,259,000. |

== 2010s ==
| Year | Date | Event |
|---|---|---|
| 2019 | January 3 | Ben McAdams assumes office as the United States representative for Utah's 4th congressional district. |
| 2019 | January 3 | Mitt Romney assumes office as the junior United States senator for the State of Utah. |
| 2017 | November 13 | John Curtis assumes office as the United States representative for Utah's 3rd congressional district. |
| 2016 | December 28 | U.S. President Barack Obama issues a public land order creating Bears Ears National Monument. |
| 2013 | January 3 | Chris Stewart assumes office as the United States representative for Utah's 2nd congressional district. |
| 2012 | November 6 | Mitt Romney loses the 2012 United States presidential election to President Barack Obama. |
| 2011 | January 3 | Mike Lee assumes office as the junior United States senator for the State of Utah. |
| 2010 | April 1 | The 2010 United States census enumerates the population of the State of Utah, later determined to be 2,763,885, an increase of 23.8% since the 2000 United States census. Utah remains the 34th most populous of the 50 U.S. states but gains a 4th congressional district. |

== 2000s ==
| Year | Date | Event |
|---|---|---|
| 2009 | August 11 | Lieutenant Governor Gary Herbert assumes office as the 17th governor of the State of Utah upon the resignation of Governor Huntsman. |
| 2005 | January 3 | Jon Huntsman Jr. assumes office as the 16th governor of the State of Utah. |
| 2003 | January 4 | Lieutenant Governor Olene Walker assumes office as the 15th governor of the State of Utah upon the resignation of Governor Leavitt. |
| 2003 | November 5 | Rob Bishop assumes office as the United States representative for Utah's 1st congressional district. |
| 2000 | April 1 | The 2000 United States census enumerates the population of the State of Utah, later determined to be 2,233,169, an increase of 29.6% since the 1990 United States census. Utah becomes the 34th most populous of the 50 U.S. states. |

== 1990s ==
| Year | Date | Event |
|---|---|---|
| 1996 | December 18 | U.S. President Bill Clinton issues a public land order creating Grand Staircase–Escalante National Monument. |
| 1993 | January 4 | Mike Leavitt assumes office as the 14th Governor of the State of Utah. |
| 1990 | April 1 | The 1990 United States census enumerates the population of the State of Utah, later determined to be 1,722,850, an increase of 17.9% since the 1980 United States census. Utah becomes the 35th most populous of the 50 U.S. states. |

== 1980s ==
| Year | Date | Event |
|---|---|---|
| 1985 | January 7 | Norman H. Bangerter assumes office as the 13th Governor of the State of Utah. |
| 1980 | April 1 | The 1980 United States census enumerates the population of the State of Utah, later determined to be 1,461,037, an increase of 37.9% since the 1970 United States census. Utah remains the 36th most populous of the 50 U.S. states but gains a 3rd Congressional District. |

== 1970s ==
| Year | Date | Event |
|---|---|---|
| 1977 | January 3 | Scott M. Matheson assumes office as the 12th Governor of the State of Utah. |
| 1971 | December 18 | U.S. President Richard Nixon signs An Act To establish the Capitol Reef National Park in the State of Utah, created from Capitol Reef National Monument. |
| 1971 | November 12 | U.S. President Richard Nixon signs An Act To establish the Arches National Park in the State of Utah, created from Arches National Monument. |
| 1970 | April 1 | The 1970 United States census enumerates the population of the State of Utah, later determined to be 1,059,273, an increase of 18.9% since the 1960 United States census. Utah becomes the 36th most populous of the 50 U.S. states. |

== 1960s ==
| Year | Date | Event |
|---|---|---|
| 1965 | January 4 | Cal Rampton assumes office as the 11th Governor of the State of Utah. |
| 1964 | September 12 | U.S. President Lyndon B. Johnson signs An Act to provide for establishment of the Canyonlands National Park in the State of Utah, and for other purposes. |
| 1960 | April 1 | The 1960 United States census enumerates the population of the State of Utah, later determined to be 890,627, an increase of 29.3% since the 1950 United States census. Utah remains the 38th most populous of the 50 U.S. states. |

== 1950s ==
| Year | Date | Event |
|---|---|---|
| 1958 | April 18 | U.S. President Dwight D. Eisenhower signs An Act to establish the Glen Canyon National Recreation Area in the States of Arizona and Utah. |
| 1957 | April 2 | U.S. President Dwight D. Eisenhower issues a public land order creating the Golden Spike National Historic Site. |
| 1957 | January 7 | George Dewey Clyde assumes office as the tenth Governor of the State of Utah. |
| 1956 | July 11 | U.S. President Dwight D. Eisenhower signs An Act to include the present area of Zion National Monument within Zion National Park, in the State of Utah, and for other purposes, adding Zion National Monument (Kolob Canyons) to Zion National Park. |
| 1953 | October 23 | U.S. President Dwight D. Eisenhower issues Public Land Order 923 merging Minidoka National Forest into Sawtooth National Forest. |
| 1950 | August 28 | U.S. President Harry S. Truman issues Public Land Order 667 changing the name of Manti National Forest to Manti-La Sal National Forest. |
| 1950 | April 1 | The 1950 United States census enumerates the population of the State of Utah, later determined to be 688,862, an increase of 25.2% since the 1940 United States census. Utah becomes the 38th most populous of the 48 U.S. states. |

== 1940s ==
| Year | Date | Event |
|---|---|---|
| 1949 | November 28 | U.S. President Harry S. Truman issues Public Land Order 618 merging La Sal National Forest into Manti National Forest. |
| 1949 | January 3 | J. Bracken Lee assumes office as the ninth Governor of the State of Utah. |
| 1945 | September 2 | World War II ends as the Empire of Japan formally surrenders. |
| 1945 | May 8 | The war in Europe ends as the Greater German Empire formally surrenders. |
| 1945 | January 19 | U.S. President Franklin D. Roosevelt issues Public Land Order 260 merging Powell National Forest into Dixie National Forest. |
| 1941 | December 11 | The United States declares war on the German Reich and the Italian Empire |
| 1941 | December 8 | The United States declares war on the Empire of Japan and enters World War II. |
| 1941 | January 6 | Herbert B. Maw assumes office as the eighth Governor of the State of Utah. |
| 1940 | April 1 | The 1940 United States census enumerates the population of the State of Utah, later determined to be 550,310, an increase of 8.4% since the 1930 United States census. Utah remains the 40th most populous of the 48 U.S. states. |

== 1930s ==
| Year | Date | Event |
|---|---|---|
| 1937 | August 2 | U.S. President Franklin D. Roosevelt issues an executive order creating Capitol Reef National Monument. |
| 1937 | January 22 | U.S. President Franklin D. Roosevelt issues an executive order creating a second Zion National Monument to include the Kolob Canyons. |
| 1933 | August 22 | U.S. President Franklin D. Roosevelt issues an executive order creating Cedar Breaks National Monument. |
| 1933 | January 2 | Henry H. Blood assumes office as the seventh Governor of the State of Utah. |
| 1930 | April 1 | The 1930 United States census enumerates the population of the State of Utah, later determined to be 507,847, an increase of 13.0% since the 1920 United States census. Utah remains the 40th most populous of the 48 U.S. states. |

== 1920s ==
| Year | Date | Event |
|---|---|---|
| 1929 | April 12 | U.S. President Herbert Hoover issues an executive order creating Arches National Monument. |
| 1928 | June 7 | U.S. President Calvin Coolidge signs An Act To change the name of the Utah National Park, to the "Bryce Canyon National Park", and for other purposes. |
| 1925 | January 5 | George Dern assumes office as the sixth Governor of the State of Utah. |
| 1924 | June 7 | U.S. President Calvin Coolidge signs An Act To establish the Utah National Park in the State of Utah, created from Bryce Canyon National Monument. |
| 1924 | June 2 | U.S. President Calvin Coolidge signs An Act To authorize the Secretary of the Interior to issue certificates of citizenship to Indians, also known as the Indian Citizenship Act of 1924, finally granting full United States Citizenship to all Native Americans born in the United States. |
| 1923 | September 24 | U.S. President Calvin Coolidge issues Executive Order 3908 merging Fillmore National Forest into Fishlake National Forest. |
| 1923 | June 8 | U.S. President Warren G. Harding issues an executive order creating Bryce Canyon National Monument. |
| 1923 | March 2 | U.S. President Warren G. Harding issues an executive order creating Hovenweep National Monument. |
| 1922 | October 14 | U.S. President Warren G. Harding issues an executive order creating Timpanogos Cave National Monument. |
| 1922 | February 14 | U.S. President Warren G. Harding issues Executive Orders 3635 and 3636 merging Sevier National Forest into Dixie National Forest and Powell National Forest. |
| 1921 | January 3 | Charles R. Mabey assumes office as the fifth Governor of the State of Utah. |
| 1920 | April 1 | The 1920 United States census enumerates the population of the State of Utah, later determined to be 449,396, an increase of 20.4% since the 1910 United States census. Utah becomes the 40th most populous of the 48 U.S. states. |

== 1910s ==
| Year | Date | Event |
|---|---|---|
| 1919 | November 19 | U.S. President Woodrow Wilson signs An Act To establish the Zion National Park in the State of Utah, created from Zion National Monument. |
| 1918 | November 11 | An armistice halts the Great War. |
| 1918 | March 18 | U.S. President Woodrow Wilson issues a proclamation enlarging Mukuntuweap National Monument and changing the name to Zion National Monument. |
| 1918 | January 7 | The State of Utah creates Daggett County from portions of Summit County and Uintah County. |
| 1917 | April 6 | The United States declares war on the German Empire and enters the Great War. |
| 1917 | January 1 | Simon Bamberger assumes office as the fourth Governor of the State of Utah. |
| 1916 | August 25 | U.S. President Woodrow Wilson signs An Act To establish a National Park Service, and for other purposes. |
| 1915 | October 4 | U.S. President Woodrow Wilson issues a proclamation creating Dinosaur National Monument. |
| 1915 | June 23 | U.S. President Woodrow Wilson issues Proclamation 1298 merging Nebo National Forest into Uinta National Forest. |
| 1915 | January 4 | The State of Utah creates Duchesne County from a portion of Wasatch County. |
| 1910 | May 30 | U.S. President William Howard Taft issues an executive order creating Rainbow Bridge National Monument. |
| 1910 | April 1 | The 1910 United States census enumerates the population of the State of Utah, later determined to be 373,351, an increase of 34.9% since the 1900 United States census. Utah becomes the 41st most populous of the 46 U.S. states but gains a 2nd Congressional District. |

== 1900s ==
| Year | Date | Event |
|---|---|---|
| 1909 | July 31 | U.S. President William Howard Taft issues an executive order creating Mukuntuweap National Monument. |
| 1909 | March 16 | U.S. President William Howard Taft issues Executive Order 1051 changing the name of La Salle National Forest back to La Sal National Forest. |
| 1909 | January 4 | William Spry assumes office as the third Governor of the State of Utah. |
| 1908 | July 2 | U.S. President Theodore Roosevelt issues Executive Order 908: (1) merging Raft River National Forest into the new Minidoka National Forest; (2) merging Glenwood National Forest into Fish Lake National Forest and changing its name to Fishlake National Forest; (3) merging Monticello National Forest into La Sal National Forest and changing its name to La Salle National Forest; (4) merging Grantsville National Forest and Salt Lake National Forest into Wasatch National Forest; and (5) changing the name of Aquarius National Forest to Powell National Forest. |
| 1908 | July 1 | U.S. President Theodore Roosevelt issues Executive Order 884 creating Ashley National Forest. |
| 1908 | June 18 | U.S. President Theodore Roosevelt issues Executive Order 827 merging Payson National Forest into the Nebo National Forest. |
| 1908 | June 18 | U.S. President Theodore Roosevelt issues Executive Order 826 merging Beaver National Forest into Fillmore National Forest. |
| 1908 | April 16 | U.S. President Theodore Roosevelt issues a proclamation creating the Natural Bridges National Monument. |
| 1908 | February 6 | U.S. President Theodore Roosevelt issues Executive Order 802 merging Bear River National Forest into the new Cache National Forest. |
| 1907 | February 6 | U.S. President Theodore Roosevelt issues a proclamation creating the Glenwood Forest Reserve. |
| 1907 | February 6 | U.S. President Theodore Roosevelt issues a proclamation creating the Monticello Forest Reserve. |
| 1906 | November 5 | U.S. President Theodore Roosevelt issues a proclamation creating the Raft River Forest Reserve. |
| 1906 | August 16 | U.S. President Theodore Roosevelt issues a proclamation creating the Wasatch Forest Reserve. |
| 1906 | June 8 | U.S. President Theodore Roosevelt signs An Act For the preservation of American antiquities, also known as the Antiquities Act of 1906, giving the President of the United States the authority to create national monuments on federal lands to protect significant natural, cultural, or scientific features. |
| 1906 | May 28 | U.S. President Theodore Roosevelt issues a proclamation merging the Logan Forest Reserve into the new Bear River Forest Reserve. |
| 1906 | May 19 | U.S. President Theodore Roosevelt issues a proclamation creating the Fillmore Forest Reserve. |
| 1906 | April 24 | U.S. President Theodore Roosevelt issues a proclamation creating the Vernon Forest Reserve. |
| 1906 | January 25 | U.S. President Theodore Roosevelt issues a proclamation creating the La Sal Forest Reserve. |
| 1906 | January 24 | U.S. President Theodore Roosevelt issues a proclamation creating the Beaver Forest Reserve. |
| 1906 | January 16 | U.S. President Theodore Roosevelt issues a proclamation enlarging the Uintah Forest Reserve and changing the name to the Uinta Forest Reserve. |
| 1905 | September 25 | U.S. President Theodore Roosevelt issues a proclamation creating the Dixie Forest Reserve. |
| 1905 | May 16 | U.S. President Theodore Roosevelt issues a proclamation creating the Sevier Forest Reserve. |
| 1905 | January 2 | John Christopher Cutler assumes office as the second Governor of the State of Utah. |
| 1904 | May 26 | U.S. President Theodore Roosevelt issues Proclamation 31 creating the Salt Lake Forest Reserve. |
| 1904 | May 7 | U.S. President Theodore Roosevelt issues Proclamation 27 creating the Grantsville Forest Reserve. |
| 1903 | October 24 | U.S. President Theodore Roosevelt issues Proclamation 9 creating the Aquarius Forest Reserve. |
| 1903 | May 29 | U.S. President Theodore Roosevelt issues Proclamation 2 creating the Manti Forest Reserve. |
| 1903 | May 29 | U.S. President Theodore Roosevelt issues Proclamation 1 creating the Logan Forest Reserve. |
| 1901 | August 3 | U.S. President William McKinley issues Proclamation 23 creating the Payson Forest Reserve. |
| 1900 | April 1 | The 1900 United States census enumerates the population of the State of Utah, later determined to be 276,749, an increase of 31.3% since the 1890 United States census. Utah becomes the 40th most populous of the 45 U.S. states. |

== 1890s ==
| Year | Date | Event |
|---|---|---|
| 1899 | February 22 | U.S. President William McKinley issues Proclamation 23 creating the Fish Lake Forest Reserve. |
| 1898 | December 10 | The United States of America and the Kingdom of Spain sign the Treaty of Paris of 1898 to end the Spanish–American War. |
| 1898 | August 12 | The United States of America and the Kingdom of Spain sign a Protocol of Peace. |
| 1898 | April 23 | The Kingdom of Spain declares war on the United States of America. The United States declares war on Spain two days later. |
| 1897 | February 22 | U.S. President Grover Cleveland issues Proclamation 20 creating the Uintah Forest Reserve. |
| 1896 | January 6 | Heber Manning Wells assumes office as the first Governor of the State of Utah. |
| 1896 | January 4 | U.S. President Grover Cleveland issues Proclamation 382: Admitting Utah to the Union. The Territory of Utah becomes the State of Utah, the 45th U.S. state. |
| 1894 | July 16 | U.S. President Grover Cleveland signs An Act to enable the people of Utah to form a constitution and State government, and to be admitted into the Union on an equal footing with the original States. |
| 1894 | March 8 | The Territory of Utah creates Carbon County from a portion of Emery County. |
| 1893 | May 9 | U.S. President Grover Cleveland appoints Caleb Walton West as the 15th (and last) Governor of the Territory of Utah. |
| 1892 | March 10 | The Territory of Utah creates Wayne County from a portion of Piute County. |
| 1891 | March 3 | U.S. President Benjamin Harrison signs An act to repeal timber-culture laws, and for other purposes, also known as the Forest Reserve Act of 1891, giving the President of the United States the authority to create protected national forests on federal lands. |
| 1890 | April 1 | The 1890 United States census enumerates the population of the Territory of Utah, later determined to be 210,779, an increase of 46.4% since the 1880 United States census. Utah becomes the second most populous of the five U.S. territories. |
| 1890 | March 13 | The Territory of Utah creates Grand County from a portion of Emery County. |

== 1880s ==
| Year | Date | Event |
|---|---|---|
| 1889 | May 6 | U.S. President Benjamin Harrison appoints Arthur Lloyd Thomas as the 14th Governor of the Territory of Utah. |
| 1886 | May 12 | U.S. President Grover Cleveland appoints Caleb Walton West as the 13th Governor of the Territory of Utah. |
| 1882 | March 9 | The Territory of Utah creates Garfield County from a portion of Iron County. |
| 1880 | April 1 | The 1880 United States census enumerates the population of the Territory of Utah, later determined to be 143,963, an increase of 33.2% since the 1870 United States census. Utah becomes the most populous of the eight U.S. territories. |
| 1880 | July 3 | U.S. President Rutherford B. Hayes appoints Eli Houston Murray as the 12th Governor of the Territory of Utah. |
| 1880 | February 18 | The Territory of Utah creates Uintah County from portions of Sanpete County, Summit County, and Wasatch County. |
| 1880 | February 17 | The Territory of Utah creates San Juan County from portions of Iron County, Kane County, and Piute County. |
| 1880 | February 12 | The Territory of Utah creates Emery County from portions of Sanpete County, Sevier County, and Piute County. |

== 1870s ==
| Year | Date | Event |
|---|---|---|
| 1875 | July 3 | U.S. President Ulysses S. Grant appoints George W. Emery as the 11th Governor of the Territory of Utah. |
| 1875 | February 2 | U.S. President Ulysses S. Grant appoints Samuel Beach Axtell as the tenth Governor of the Territory of Utah. |
| 1872 | March 1 | U.S. President Ulysses S. Grant signs An Act to set apart a certain tract of land lying near the headwaters of the Yellowstone River as a public park, creating Yellowstone National Park, the world's first national park. |
| 1872 | February 16 | The Territory of Utah merges Rio Virgen County back into Washington County. |
| 1872 | February 16 | The Territory of Utah merges Green River County into Summit County. |
| 1871 | March 10 | U.S. President Ulysses S. Grant appoints George Lemuel Woods as the ninth Governor of the Territory of Utah. |
| 1870 | October 30 | U.S. President Ulysses S. Grant appoints Vernon H. Vaughan as the eighth Governor of the Territory of Utah. |
| 1870 | April 1 | The 1870 United States census enumerates the population of the Territory of Utah, later determined to be 86,336, an increase of 114% since the 1860 United States census. Utah becomes the second most populous of the nine U.S. territories. |
| 1870 | March 20 | U.S. President Ulysses S. Grant appoints John Wilson Shaffer as the seventh Governor of the Territory of Utah. |

== 1860s ==
| Year | Date | Event |
|---|---|---|
| 1869 | February 18 | The Territory of Utah creates Rio Virgen County from a portion of Washington County. |
| 1868 | January 29 | The Territory of Utah changes the name of Richland County to Rich County. |
| 1868 | January 29 | The Territory of Utah changes the name of Great Salt Lake County to Salt Lake County. |
| 1866 | May 5 | U.S. President Andrew Johnson signs An Act concerning the Boundaries of the State of Nevada, annexing the portion of the Territory of Utah west of the 37th meridian west from Washington (114°02′43″W) to the State of Nevada. |
| 1865 | September 30 | U.S. President Andrew Johnson appoints Charles Durkee as the sixth Governor of the Territory of Utah. |
| 1865 | May 9 | U.S. President Andrew Johnson proclaims the end of the American Civil War. |
| 1865 | April 15 | U.S. Vice President Andrew Johnson assumes office as the 17th President of the United States upon the assassination of Abraham Lincoln. |
| 1865 | January 16 | The Territory of Utah creates Sevier County from a portion of Sanpete County. |
| 1865 | January 16 | The Territory of Utah creates Piute County from a portion of Beaver County. |
| 1864 | January 16 | The Territory of Utah creates Richland County from a portion of Cache County. |
| 1864 | January 16 | The Territory of Utah creates Kane County from a portion of Washington County. |
| 1863 | June 22 | U.S. President Abraham Lincoln appoints James Duane Doty as the fifth Governor of the Territory of Utah. |
| 1862 | July 14 | U.S. President Abraham Lincoln signs An Act to extend the territorial Limits of the Territory of Nevada, annexing the portion of the Territory of Utah west of the 38th meridian west from Washington (115°02′43″W) to the Territory of Nevada. |
| 1862 | July 7 | U.S. President Abraham Lincoln appoints Stephen S. Harding as the fourth Governor of the Territory of Utah. |
| 1862 | January 17 | The Territory of Utah abolishes Cedar County, Desert County, Greasewood County, Malad County, St. Mary's County, and Shambip County. |
| 1862 | January 17 | The Territory of Utah creates Wasatch County from portions of Great Salt Lake County, Green River County, Sanpete County, Summit County, and Utah County. |
| 1862 | January 17 | The Territory of Utah creates Morgan County from portions of Davis County, Great Salt Lake County, Summit County, and Weber County. |
| 1861 | December 7 | U.S. President Abraham Lincoln appoints John W. Dawson as the third Governor of the Territory of Utah. |
| 1861 | June 6 | Jefferson Territorial Governor Robert Williamson Steele proclaims the Territory of Jefferson officially disbanded. |
| 1861 | April 12 | The American Civil War begins with the Battle of Fort Sumter. |
| 1861 | March 4 | Abraham Lincoln assumes office as the 16th President of the United States. |
| 1861 | March 2 | U.S. President James Buchanan signs An Act to organize the Territory of Nevada. The Territory of Utah loses all land west of the 39th meridian west from Washington (116°02′43″W) to the new Territory of Nevada, including Carson County and Humboldt County. |
| 1861 | February 28 | U.S. President James Buchanan signs the An Act to provide a temporary Government for the Territory of Colorado. |
| 1861 | February 8 | Seven secessionist slave states create the Confederate States of America. |
| 1860 | November 6 | Abraham Lincoln is elected President of the United States. Seven slave states will secede from the United States of America before February 8, 1861. |
| 1860 | April 1 | The 1860 United States census enumerates the population of the Territory of Utah, later determined to be 40,273, an increase of 254% since the 1850 United States census. Utah becomes the third most populous of the eight U.S. territories. |

== 1850s ==
| Year | Date | Event |
|---|---|---|
| 1859 | October 24 | Voters of the Pike's Peak goldfields approve the establishment of the Provisional Government of the Territory of Jefferson. The proposed territory includes the portion of the Territory of Utah east of the 110th meridian west. |
| 1858 | April 12 | U.S. President James Buchanan appoints Alfred Cumming as the second Governor of the Territory of Utah. |
| 1856 | January 12 | The Territory of Utah creates Shambip County from a portion of Tooele County. |
| 1856 | January 5 | The Territory of Utah creates St. Mary's County from portions of Desert County, Juab County, Tooele County, and Weber County. |
| 1856 | January 5 | The Territory of Utah creates Humboldt County from portions of Desert County, Juab County, Tooele County, and Weber County. |
| 1856 | January 5 | The Territory of Utah creates Malad County from a portion of Weber County. |
| 1856 | January 5 | The Territory of Utah creates Greasewood County from a portion of Weber County. |
| 1856 | January 5 | The Territory of Utah creates Cache County from a portion of Weber County. |
| 1856 | January 5 | The Territory of Utah creates Box Elder County from a portion of Weber County. |
| 1856 | January 5 | The Territory of Utah creates Cedar County from a portion of Utah County. |
| 1856 | January 5 | The Territory of Utah creates Beaver County from a portion of Iron County. |
| 1854 | January 17 | The Territory of Utah creates Carson County from a portion of Iron County. |
| 1854 | January 13 | The Territory of Utah creates Summit County from portions of Great Salt Lake County and Green River County. |
| 1852 | March 3 | The Territory of Utah creates four original counties: Desert County, Juab County, Green River County, and Washington County. |
| 1852 | March 3 | The Territory of Utah creates seven original counties with borders modified from the seven State of Deseret counties: Davis County, Great Salt Lake County, Iron County, Sanpete County, Tooele County, Utah County, and Weber County. |
| 1851 | October 4 | The Territory of Utah creates the original county of Millard County. |
| 1851 | April 5 | The State of Deseret dissolves and yields to the Territory of Utah. |
| 1851 | February 3 | U.S. President Millard Fillmore appoints Brigham Young as the first Governor of the Territory of Utah. |
| 1850 | October 5 | The State of Deseret creates Davis County from portions of Great Salt Lake County and Weber County. |
| 1850 | September 9 | The Territory of Utah and the Territory of New Mexico are established as part of the Compromise of 1850. U.S. President Millard Fillmore signs An Act to establish a Territorial Government for Utah and An Act proposing to the State of Texas the Establishment of her Northern and Western Boundaries, the Relinquishment by the said State of all Territory claimed by her exterior to said Boundaries, and of all her Claims upon the United States, and to establish a territorial Government for New Mexico. |
| 1850 | April 1 | The 1850 United States census enumerates the population of the future Territory of Utah, later determined to be 11,380. Utah will become the third most populous of the five U.S. territories. |
| 1850 | January 31 | The State of Deseret creates six original counties: Great Salt Lake County, Iron County, Sanpete County, Tuilla County, Utah County, and Weber County. |

== 1840s ==
| Year | Date | Event |
|---|---|---|
| 1849 | March 12 | The Mormon settlers of the Great Salt Lake Valley create the Provisional Government of the State of Deseret and elect Brigham Young as the first (and only) Governor. The proposed state includes the entire Great Basin and the entire drainage basin of the Colorado River within the United States. The provisional state includes all of the future State of Utah plus portions of the future states of Wyoming, Colorado, New Mexico, Arizona, California, and Nevada. The State of Deseret provides a de facto government for the Great Salt Lake Valley. |
| 1848 | February 2 | The United States and United Mexican States sign the Treaty of Guadalupe Hidalgo to end the Mexican–American War. Mexico relinquishes all of its northern territories. All land in the future State of Utah becomes unorganized United States territory. |
| 1846 | May 13 | The United States declares war on the Mexican Republic. |

== 1830s ==
| Year | Date | Event |

== 1820s ==
| Year | Date | Event |
|---|---|---|
| 1828 | January 12 | The United States and Mexico sign the Treaty of Limits affirming the boundaries set by the Adams–Onís Treaty of 1819. |
| 1821 | August 24 | Ferdinand VII of Spain signs the Treaty of Córdoba recognizing the independence of the Mexican Empire. The Spanish portion of the future State of Utah becomes part of the Mexican territory of Santa Fe de Nuevo México, although there is no permanent Mexican presence in the region. |
| 1821 | February 22 | The Adams–Onís Treaty of 1819 takes effect. The United States relinquishes all land in the future State of Utah south and west of the Arkansas River or the meridian 106°20'35" west. The rest of the land in the future state becomes part of the Territory of Missouri. |

== 1810s ==
| Year | Date | Event |
|---|---|---|
| 1819 | February 22 | The United States and the restored Kingdom of Spain sign the Adams–Onís Treaty. The United States relinquinshes its claim to land west of the 100th meridian west of Greenwich and south and west of the Arkansas River and south of the 42nd parallel north. Spain relinquishes Florida and all claims to land north of the 42nd parallel in North America. |
| 1810 | August 1 | Mexican priest Miguel Gregorio Antonio Ignacio Hidalgo-Costilla y Gallaga Mandarte Villaseñor (Hidalgo) proclaims the independence of Mexico from the Napoleonic Kingdom of Spain in the village of Dolores. |

== 1790s ==
| Year | Date | Event |

== 1780s ==
| Year | Date | Event |
|---|---|---|
| 1783 | September 3 | The Treaty of Paris is signed in Paris by representatives of King George III of Great Britain and representatives of the United States of America. The treaty affirms the independence of the United States and sets the Mississippi River as its western boundary. |

== 1770s ==
| Year | Date | Event |
|---|---|---|
| 1778 | | Bernardo de Miera y Pacheco, cartographer for the Dominguez–Escalante Expedition, publishes his map of the expedition across the Colorado Plateau. His map becomes the foundation of a future trade route later known as the Old Spanish Trail. |
| 1776 | July 29 | A Spanish-Franciscan expedition led by Franciscan priests Francisco Atanasio Domínguez and Silvestre Vélez de Escalante sets out from La Villa Real de la Santa Fé de San Francisco de Asís (Santa Fe) in search of an overland route to the Presidio Reál de San Carlos de Monterey (Monterey). The expedition follows the 1765 route of Juan Rivera northwest across the Colorado Plateau. The expedition fails to reach Las Californias, but reaches the lower Paria River in the future State of Arizona before returning to Santa Fe. |
| 1776 | July 4 | Representatives of the thirteen United States of America sign the Declaration of Independence from the Kingdom of Great Britain. |

== 1760s ==
| Year | Date | Event |
|---|---|---|
| 1765 | July | Governor Tomás Vélez Cachupin of Santa Fe de Nuevo México dispatches an expedition led by Juan Maria Antonio Rivera to explore the San Juan Mountains and the Colorado Plateau. |

== 1690s ==
| Year | Date | Event |

== 1590s ==
| Year | Date | Event |

== 1510s ==
| Year | Date | Event |
|---|---|---|
| 1513 | September 29 | Spanish conquistador Vasco Núñez de Balboa crosses the Isthmus of Panama and arrives on the shore of a sea that he names Mar del Sur (the South Sea, later named the Pacific Ocean). He claims the sea and all adjacent lands for the Queen of Castile. This includes all of the future State of Utah. |

== 1490s ==
| Year | Date | Event |
|---|---|---|
| 1493 | May 5 | Pope Alexander VI (born Roderic de Borja in Valencia) issues the papal bull Inter caetera which splits the non-Christian world into two halves. The eastern half goes to the King of Portugal for his exploration, conquest, conversion, and exploitation. The western half (including all of North America) goes to the Queen of Castile and the King of Aragon for their exploration, conquest, conversion, and exploitation. The indigenous peoples of the Americas have no idea that any of these people exist. |
| 1492 | October 12 | Genoese seaman Cristòffa Cómbo (Christopher Columbus) leading an expedition for Queen Isabella I of Castile lands on the Lucayan island of Guanahani that he renames San Salvador. This begins the Spanish conquest of the Americas. |

== Before 1492 ==
| Era | Event |
|---|---|
| c. 12,000 BCE | During a centuries long period of warming, ice-age Paleoamericans from Beringia begin using the ice-free corridor east of the Rocky Mountains to migrate throughout the Americas. |

2000s 1900s 1800s Statehood Territory 1700s 1600s 1500s Before 1492

== See also ==
- History of Utah
  - Government of Utah
    - List of Utah state legislatures
  - History of African Americans in Utah
  - History of the Colorado Plateau
  - History of the Rocky Mountains
  - Indigenous peoples of the North American Southwest
  - List of counties in Utah
  - List of ghost towns in Utah
  - List of governors of Utah
  - List of municipalities in Utah
  - Paleontology in Utah
  - Prehistory of Utah
  - Southwestern archaeology
  - Territorial evolution of Utah
    - State of Utah
    - Territory of Utah
