= List of lands protected by Theodore Roosevelt through executive action =

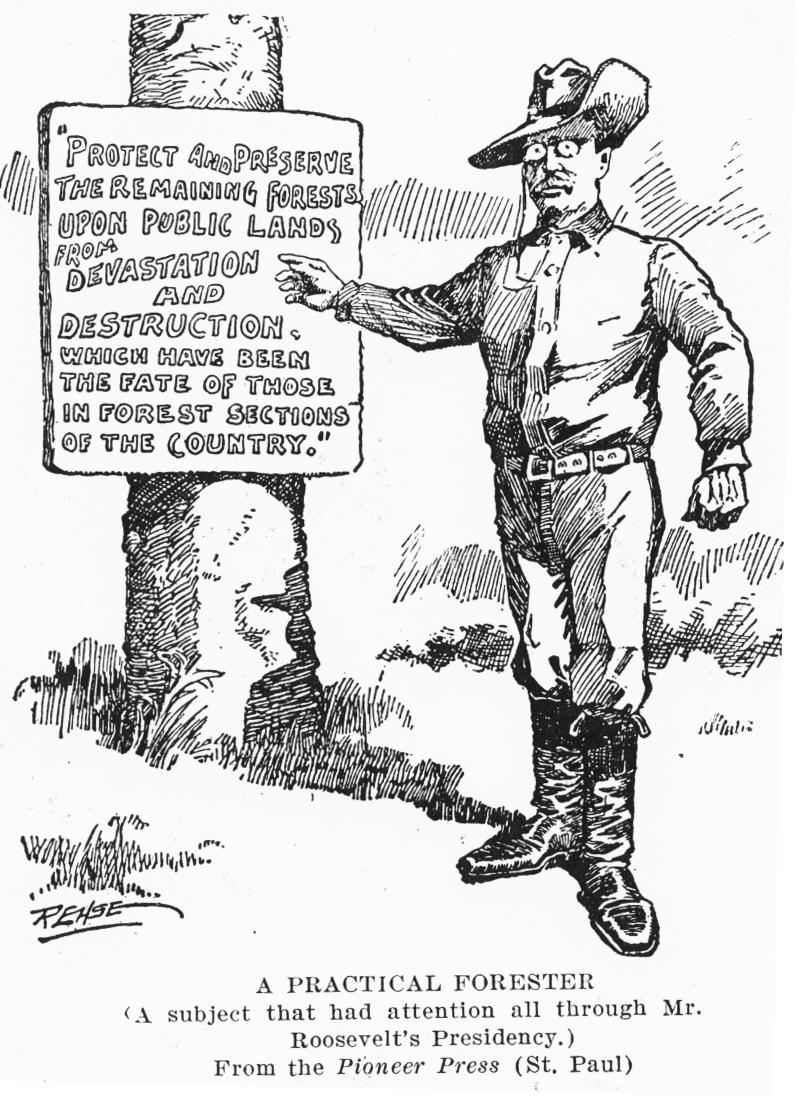
TR's conservation policies

Below is a list of lands set aside as national parks, reserves, or other conservatories by President Theodore Roosevelt via executive order or proclamation. During his presidency, Roosevelt issued nearly 10 times more executive orders than his predecessor. Many lands started out as preserves, but were expanded by later presidents and made into national forests.

A cornerstone of his actions focused on the issue of conservation, and Roosevelt set aside more national parks and nature preserves than all of his predecessors combined. At the time, Roosevelt's executive action was controversial, and many of his actions were brought before a court.

As early as 1892, in his book The Wilderness Hunter, Theodore Roosevelt was calling for the state to take command of wilderness lands.

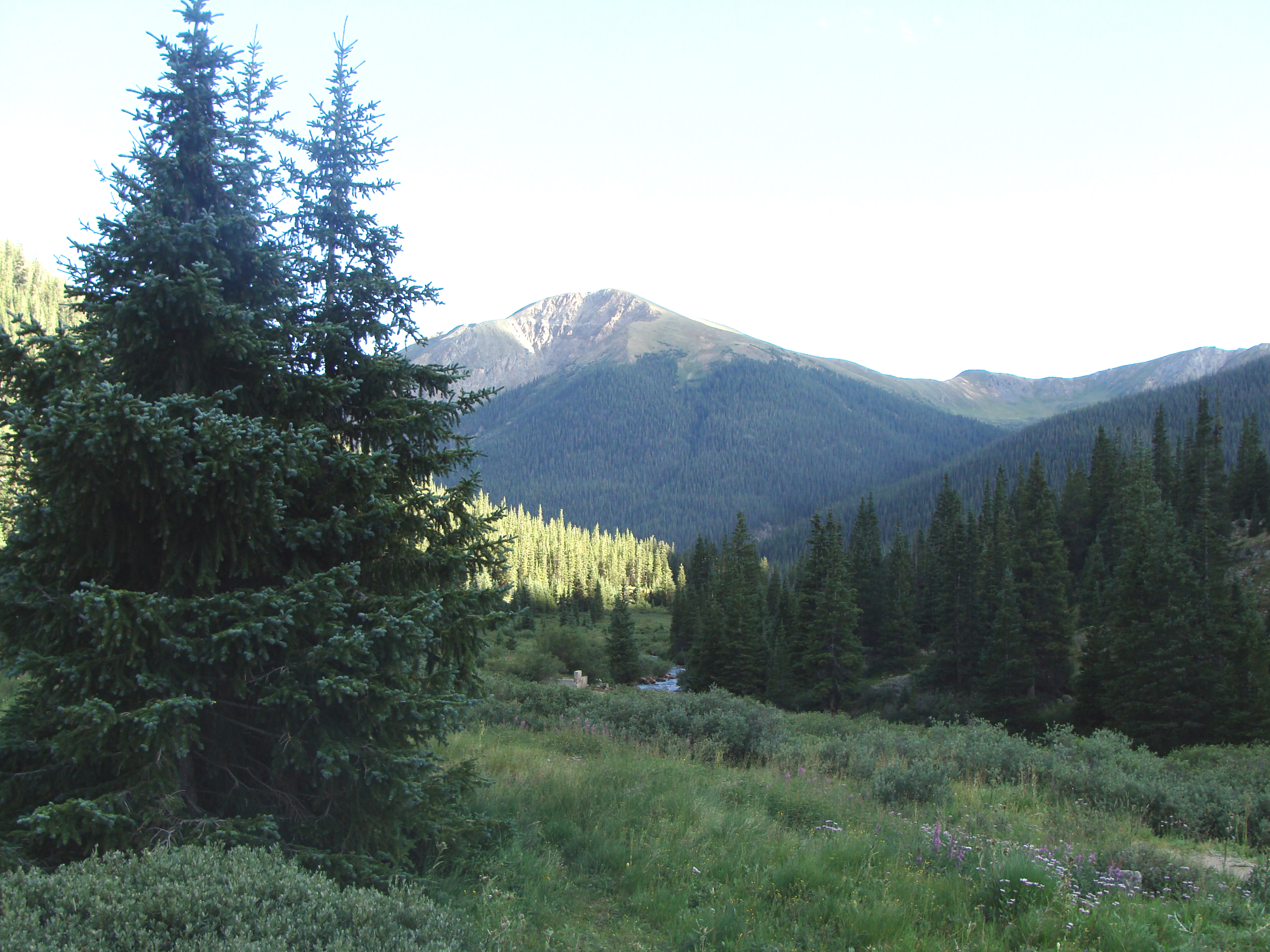
San Isabel National Forest

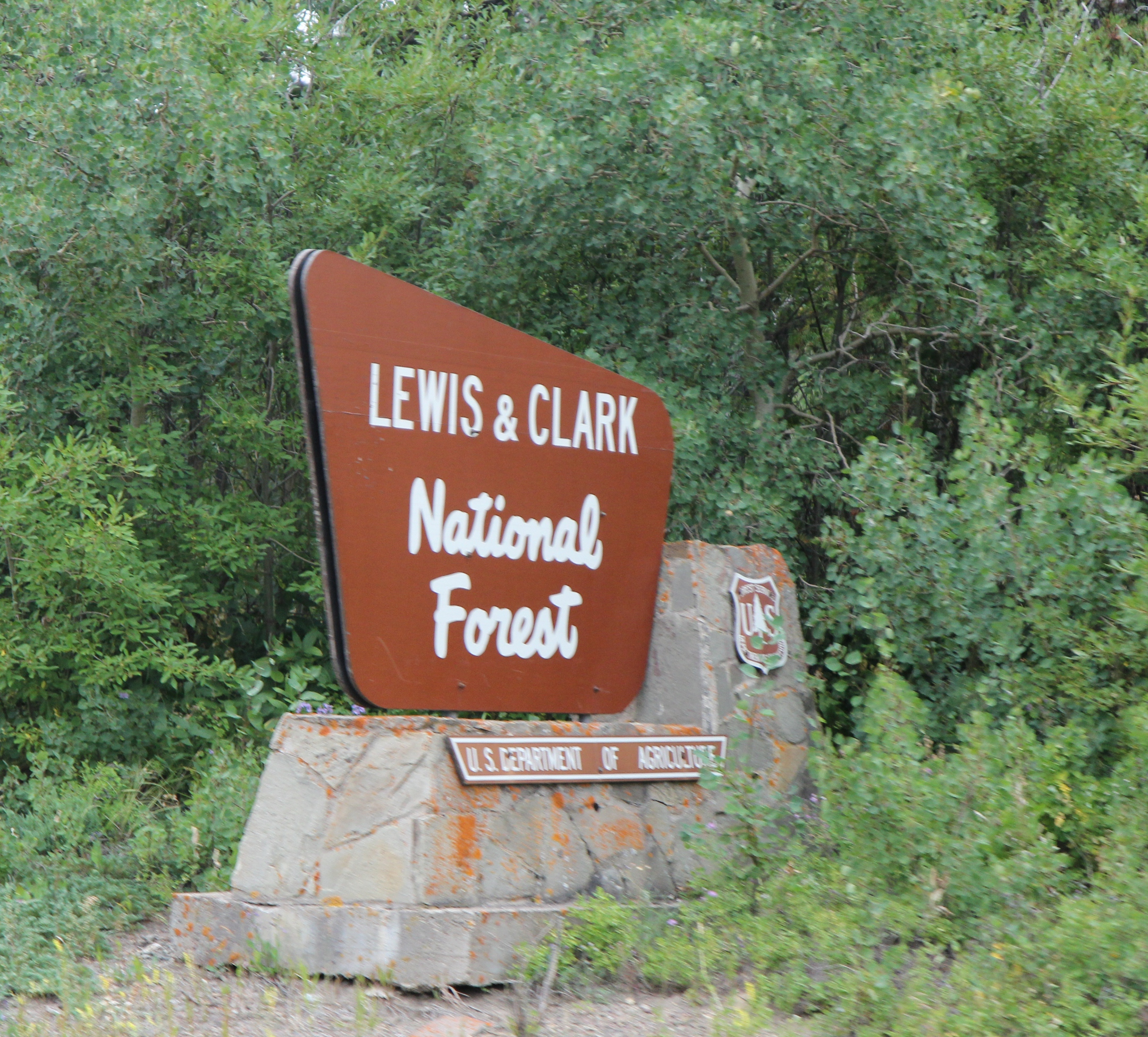
The sign for the western unit of Lewis and Clark National Forest on U.S. Route 2

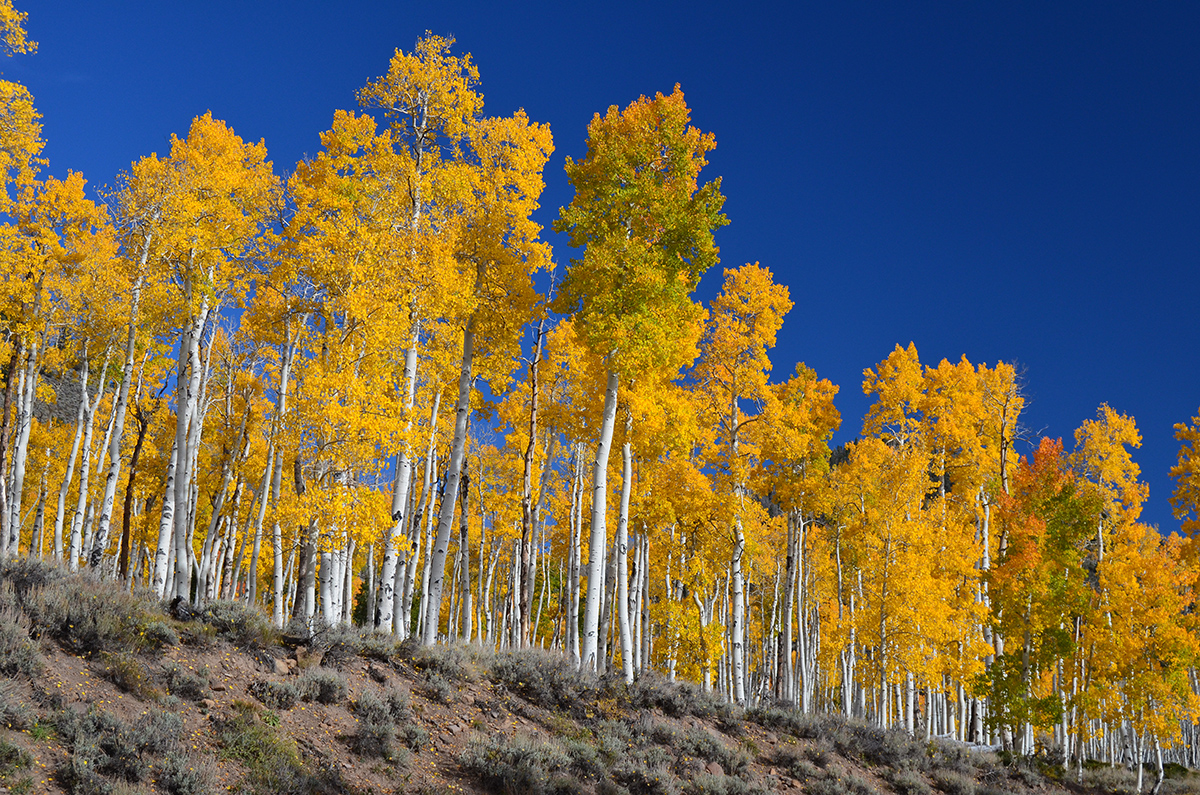
A grove of Populus tremuloides in the Fish Lake National Forest

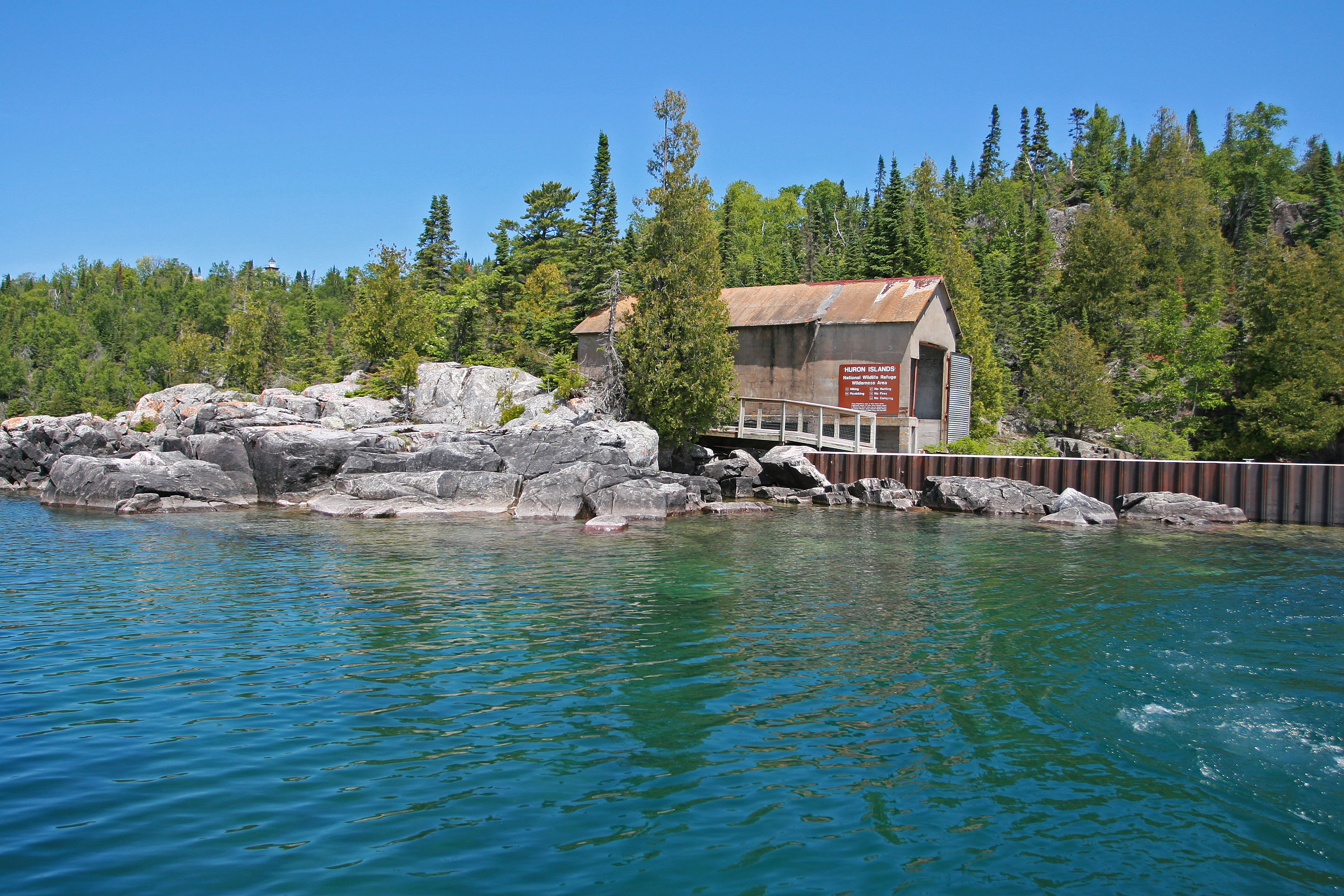
Huron National Wildlife Refuge

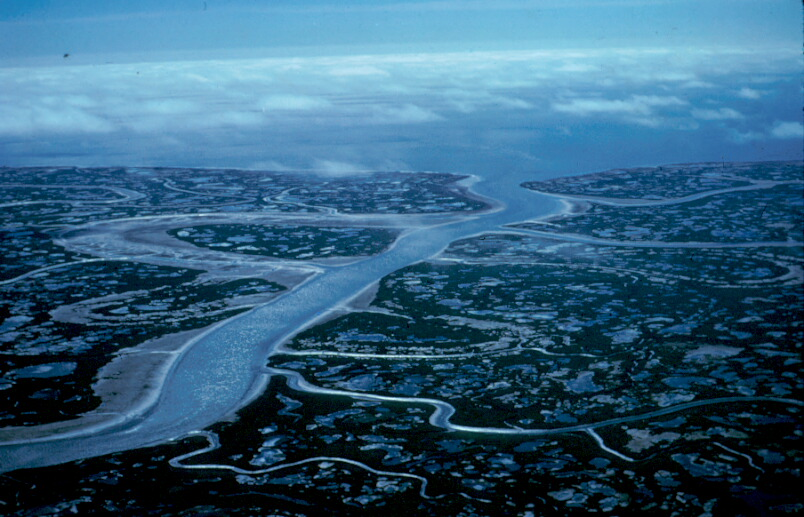
Brant goose nesting area at the Yukon Delta National Wildlife Refuge

Location	Date	Description	Executive Order or Proclamation
Colorado	April 11, 1902	San Isabel Forest Reserve	Proclamation 467
Arizona	April 11, 1902	Santa Rita Forest Reserve	Proclamation 468
California	April 12, 1902	San Francisco Mountains Forest Reserve	Proclamation 469
Nebraska	April 16, 1902	Niobrara Forest Reserve	Proclamation 470
Nebraska	April 16, 1902	Dismal River Forest Reserve	Proclamation 471
Wyoming	May 22, 1902	Yellowstone Forest Reserve and Teton Forest Reserve	Proclamation 473
Colorado	May 22, 1902	Medicine Bow Forest Reserve	Proclamation 474
Wyoming	May 22, 1902	Big Horn Forest Reserve (Expanded)	Proclamation 475
Wyoming	June 13, 1902	Yellowstone Forest Reserve (Expanded)	Proclamation 477
Colorado	June 28, 1902	White River Forest Reserve	Proclamation 479
Arizona	July 2, 1902	Santa Catalina Forest Reserve	Proclamation 481
Arizona	July 22, 1902	Mount Graham Forest Reserve	Proclamation 485
New Mexico	July 26, 1902	Lincoln Forest Reserve	Proclamation 486
Arizona	July 30, 1902	Chiricahua Forest Reserve	Proclamation 487
Montana	August 16, 1902	Little Belt Forest Reserve	Proclamation 489
Montana	August 16, 1902	Madison Forest Reserve	Proclamation 490
Alaska	August 20, 1902	Alexander Archipelago Forest Reserve	Proclamation 491
Montana	September 4, 1902	Absaroka Forest Reserve	Proclamation 493
Puerto Rico	January 17, 1903	Loquillo Forest Reserve	Proclamation 495
Wyoming	January 29, 1903	Yellowstone National Reserve (Expanded)	Proclamation 496
Utah	May 29, 1903	Manti Forest Reserve	Proclamation 499
Utah	May 29, 1903	Logan Forest Reserve	Proclamation 500
Montana	June 9, 1903	Lewis and Clarke Forest Reserve (Expanded)	Proclamation 501
Utah	September 5, 1903	Pocatello Forest Reserve	Proclamation 505
Utah	October 24, 1903	Aquarius Forest Reserve	Proclamation 507
Utah	November 5, 1903	Payson Forest Reserve (Expanded)	Proclamation 509
Montana	December 12, 1903	Highwood Mountains Forest Reserve	Proclamation 511
California	December 22, 1903	Santa Barbara Forest Reserve	Proclamation 512
Oregon	February 5, 1904	Baker City Forest Reserve	Proclamation 515
South Dakota	March 5, 1904	Cave Hills Forest Reserve	Proclamation 517
South Dakota	March 5, 1904	Slim Buttes Forest Reserve	Proclamation 518
Utah	May 2, 1904	Fish Lake Forest Reserve (Expanded)	Proclamation 522
Wyoming and Montana	May 4, 1904	Yellowstone National Reserve (Expanded)	Proclamation 524
Utah	May 7, 1904	Grantsville Forest Reserve	Proclamation 525
Utah	May 26, 1904	Salt Lake Forest Reserve	Proclamation 529
California	November 29, 1904	Warner Mountains Forest Reserve	Proclamation 534
California	November 29, 1904	Modoc Forest Reserve	Proclamation 535
Colorado	December 6, 1904	South Platte Forest Reserve	Proclamation 536
Stump Lake, North Dakota	March 9, 1905	Stump Lake (North Dakota)	E. O. 296-A
Arizona	March 20, 1905	Pinal Mountains Forest Reserve	Proclamation 539
California	March 27, 1905	Plumas Forest Reserve	Proclamation 540
California	April 26, 1905	Trinity Forest Reserve	Proclamation 543
California	May 6, 1905	Klamath Forest Reserve	Proclamation 544
Oregon	May 6, 1905	Wallowa Forest Reserve	Proclamation 546
Arizona	May 6, 1905	Grand Canyon Forest Reserve (Expanded)	Proclamation 547
Oregon and Washington	May 12, 1905	Wenaha Forest Reserve	Proclamation 548
Colorado	May 12, 1905	Leadville Forest Reserve	Proclamation 549
Utah	May 12, 1905	Sevier Forest Reserve	Proclamation 550
Oregon	May 12, 1905	Chesnimnus Forest Reserve	Proclamation 551
Montana	May 12, 1905	Elkhorn Forest Reserve	Proclamation 552
Colorado	May 12, 1905	Gunnison Forest Reserve	Proclamation 553
Colorado	May 12, 1905	Pikes Peak Forest Reserve	Proclamation 554
Idaho	May 23, 1905	Henrys Lake Forest Reserve	Proclamation 560
Idaho	May 25, 1905	Weiser Forest Reserve	Proclamation 561
Idaho	May 29, 1905	Sawtooth Forest Reserve	Proclamation 562
California	June 2, 1905	Lassen Peak Forest Reserve (Expanded)	Proclamation 564
Oregon	June 2, 1905	Mauty Mountain Forest Reserve	Proclamation 565
Idaho	June 3, 1905	Payette Forest Reserve	Proclamation 566
Colorado	June 3, 1905	San Juan Forest Reserve	Proclamation 567
Colorado	June 12, 1905	Park Range Forest Reserve	Proclamation 569
Colorado	June 12, 1905	San Isabel Forest Reserve (Expanded)	Proclamation 570
Colorado	June 12, 1905	Wet Mountains Forest Reserve	Proclamation 572
Idaho	June 12, 1905	Cassia Forest Reserve	Proclamation 573
Colorado	June 13, 1905	Cochetopa Forest Reserve	Proclamation 574
Colorado	June 13, 1905	Montezuma Forest Reserve	Proclamation 575
Colorado	June 14, 1905	Uncompahgre Forest Reserve	Proclamation 576
California	July 15, 1905	Diamond Mountain Forest Reserve	Proclamation 579
New Mexico	July 21, 1905	Gila Forest Reserve (Expanded)	Proclamation 582
Utah	July 21, 1905	Payson Forest Reserve (Expanded)	Proclamation 583
South Dakota	July 22, 1905	Short Pine National Forest	Proclamation 584
Kansas	July 25, 1905	Garden City Forest Reserve	Proclamation 585
California	July 25, 1905	Sierra Forest Reserve (Expanded)	Proclamation 586
Colorado	August 25, 1905	Holy Cross Forest Reserve	Proclamation 592
Utah	September 25, 1905	Dixie Forest Reserve	Proclamation 593
Montana	October 3, 1905	Madison Forest Reserve (Expanded)	Proclamation 594
Montana	October 3, 1905	Big Belt Forest Reserve	Proclamation 595
California	October 3, 1905	Shasta Forest Reserve	Proclamation 596
California and Nevada	October 3, 1905	Tahoe Forest Reserve (Expanded)	Proclamation 597
Arizona	October 3, 1905	Tonto Forest Reserve	Proclamation 598
Montana	October 3, 1905	Hell Gate Forest Reserve	Proclamation 599
New Mexico	October 3, 1905	Lincoln Forest Reserve (Expanded)	Proclamation 600
New Mexico	October 3, 1905	Portales Forest Reserve	Proclamation 601
Montana	October 3, 1905	Little Belt Forest Reserve (Expanded)	Proclamation 602
Anna Maria, Florida	October 10, 1905	Passage Key National Wildlife Refuge	357-B
Isle Royal, Michigan	October 10, 1905	Siskiwit Lake (Isle Royale)	357-C
Marquette County, Michigan	October 10, 1905	Huron National Wildlife Refuge	357-D
New Mexico	October 12, 1905	Jemez Forest Reserve	Proclamation 603
South Dakota	October 31, 1905	Black Hills Forest Reserve	365-B
Louisiana	November 11, 1905	Breton Island Reservation	369-A
California	November 11, 1905	Yuba Forest Reserve	Proclamation 606
Florida	February 10, 1906	Indian Key Reservation	409
Arizona	June 30, 1906	Black Mesa Forest Reserve (Expanded)	Proclamation 606
Louisiana	August 8, 1907	Tern Islands Reservation	675
Louisiana	August 17, 1907	Shell Keys Reservation	682
Oregon	October 14, 1907	Three Arch Rocks Reservation	699
Washington	October 23, 1907	Flattery Rocks Reservation	703
Washington	October 23, 1907	Copalis Rock Reservation	704
Washington	October 23, 1907	Quillayute Needles Reservation	705
Louisiana	December 7, 1907	East Timbalier Island Reservation	718
Florida	February 24, 1908	Mosquito Inlet Reservation	763
Florida	April 6, 1908	Tortugas Keys Reservation	779
Idaho and Utah	May 26, 1908	Pocatello National Forest (Expanded)	801
Utah	May 26, 1908	Cache National Forest	802
Oregon	June 13, 1908	Whitman National Forest	813
Oregon	June 13, 1908	Malheur National Forest	814
Oregon	June 13, 1908	Umatilla National Forest	815
Oregon	June 13, 1908	Deschutes National Forest	816
Oregon	June 13, 1908	Fremont National Forest	817
Washington	June 18, 1908	Columbia National Forest	820
Washington	June 18, 1908	Chelan National Forest	823
Washington	June 18, 1908	Snoqualmie National Forest	824
Washington	June 18, 1908	Wenatchee National Forest	825
Utah	June 18, 1908	Neba National Forest	827
Montana	June 25, 1908	Blackfeet National Forest	834
Montana	June 25, 1908	Flathead National Forest	835
Colorado	June 25, 1908	Routt National Forest	837
Colorado	June 25, 1908	Hayden National Forest	830
Idaho	June 26, 1908	Challis National Forest	840
Idaho	June 26, 1908	Salmon National Forest	841
Idaho	June 26, 1908	Pend Oreille National Forest	844
Idaho	June 26, 1908	Kanikau National Forest	845
California	June 26, 1908	Angeles National Forest	846
California	June 26, 1908	San Luis National Forest	847
New Mexico	June 26, 1908	Carson National Forest	848
Wyoming	June 26, 1908	Sundance National Forest	850
Idaho	June 26, 1908	Idaho National Forest	855
Idaho	June 26, 1908	Boise National Forest	857
Oregon	June 30, 1908	Siuslaw National Forest	860
Wyoming	June 30, 1908	Cheyenne National Forest	861
Oregon	June 30, 1908	Cascade National Forest	863
Oregon	June 30, 1908	Oregon National Forest	864
Oregon and California	June 13, 1908	Cheyenne National Forest (Expanded)	866
Wyoming	July 1, 1908	Targhee National Forest	871
Wyoming	July 1, 1908	Teton National Forest	872
Wyoming	July 1, 1908	Wyoming National Forest	873
Wyoming	July 1, 1908	Bonneville National Forest	874
Montana	July 1, 1908	Absaroka National Forest	875
Montana	July 1, 1908	Beaverhead National Forest	877
Montana	July 1, 1908	Deerlodge National Forest	880
Colorado	July 1, 1908	Rio Grande National Forest	887
Colorado	July 1, 1908	Pike National Forest	888
Colorado	July 1, 1908	Arapaho National Forest	893
Colorado	July 1, 1908	Battlement National Forest	894
Wyoming	July 1, 1908	Shoshone National Forest	895
Montana	June 30, 1908	Beartooth National Forest	896
California	July 2, 1908	Lassen National Forest	906
California	July 2, 1908	California National Forest	907
Florida	August 8, 1908	Key West Reservation	923
Oregon	August 8, 1908	Klamath Lake Reservation	924
Oregon	August 18, 1908	Lake Malheur Reservation	929
North Dakota	August 28, 1908	Chase Lake Reservation	932
Florida	September 15, 1908	Pine Island Reservation	939
Florida	September 26, 1908	Palma Sola Reservation	942
Florida	September 26, 1908	Matlacha Pass Reservation	943
Florida	October 23, 1908	Island Bay Reservation	958
Oregon	October 26, 1908	Loch Katrine Reservation	961
Hawaii	February 3, 1909	Hawaiian Islands Reservation	1019
Arizona, California, Idaho, Montana, New Mexico; Oregon, South Dakota, Utah, Washington, Wyoming	February 25, 1909	Seventeen Reservations	1032
Alaska	February 27, 1909	Bering Sea Reservation	1037
Alaska	February 27, 1909	Fire Island Reservation	1038
Alaska	February 27, 1909	Tuxedni Reservation	1039
Alaska	February 27, 1909	Saint Lazaria Reservation	1040
Alaska	February 27, 1909	Yukon Delta Reservation	1041
Puerto Rico	February 27, 1909	Culebra Reservation	1042
California	February 27, 1909	Farallon Reservation	1043
Alaska	February 27, 1909	Pribilof Reservation	1044
Alaska	March 3, 1909	Bogoslof Reservation	1049
