= Carson County =

Carson County may refer to:

- Carson County, Texas
- Carson County, Utah Territory, now Carson City, Nevada
