= List of counties in Utah =

Counties of Utah
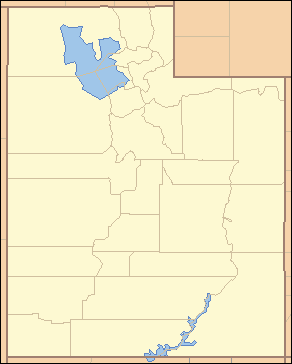
- Location: State of Utah
- Number: 29
- Populations: 934 (Daggett) – 1,220,916 (Salt Lake)
- Areas: 299 square miles (770 km^{2}) (Davis) – 7,820 square miles (20,300 km^{2}) (San Juan)
- Government: County government
- Subdivisions: Cities, towns, townships, unincorporated communities, Indian reservations, census-designated places

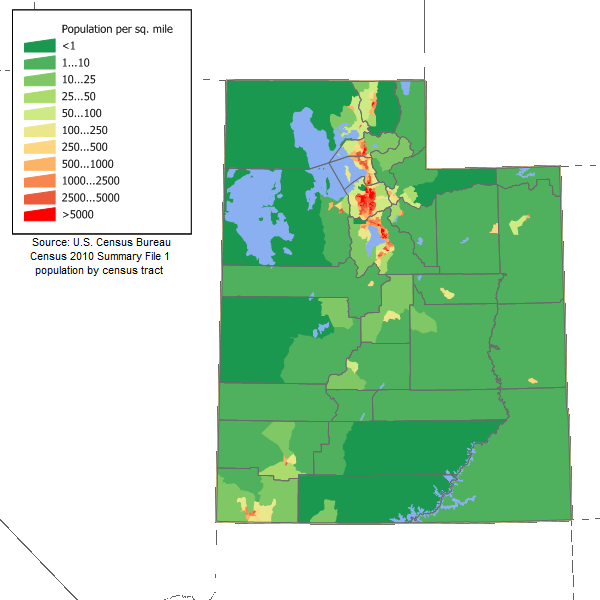
Population density of Utah counties

There are 29 counties in the U.S. state of Utah.

In 1849, the provisional State of Deseret established seven counties: Davis, Iron, Sanpete, Salt Lake, Tooele, Utah, and Weber. After the Territory of Utah was created in 1851, the first territorial legislature (1851–1852) acknowledged those seven and created three more: Juab, Millard, and Washington. Over a 40-year period (1854–1894), the Utah Territorial Legislature established most of the counties that exist today. In the early 20th century, after Utah had become a state, the final two counties were created: Duchesne by gubernatorial proclamation (1913) and Daggett by popular vote (1917). Present-day Duchesne County encompassed an Indian reservation that was created in 1861. The reservation was opened to homesteaders in 1905 and the county was created in 1913. Due to dangerous roads, mountainous terrain, and bad weather preventing travel via a direct route, 19th-century residents in present-day Daggett County had to travel 400 to 800 miles (640 to 1,290 km) on both stage and rail to conduct business in Vernal, the county seat for Uintah County a mere 50 miles (80 km) away. In 1917, all Uintah County residents voted to create Daggett County.

Based on 2025 United States Census data, the population of Utah was 3,538,904. Just under 75% of Utah's population is concentrated along four Wasatch Front counties: Salt Lake, Utah, Davis, and Weber. Salt Lake County was the largest county in the state with a population of 1,220,916, followed by Utah County with 759,859, Davis County with 381,227 and Weber County with 278,174. Daggett County was the least populated with 934 people. The largest county in land area is San Juan County with 7,821 square miles (20,260 km^{2}) and Davis County is the smallest with 304 square miles (790 km^{2}).

The Federal Information Processing Standard (FIPS) code, which is used by the United States government to uniquely identify states and counties, is provided with each county. Utah's FIPS code is 49, which when combined with any county code would be written as 49XXX. In the FIPS code column in the table below, each FIPS code links to the most current census data for that county.

The Utah Code (Title 17, Chapter 50, Part 5) divides the counties into six classes by population:

- First class: Population of 1,000,000 or more. Only one county - Salt Lake - is first class.
- Second class: Population between 175,000 and 1,000,000. Four counties.
- Third class: Population between 40,000 and 175,000. Five counties.
- Fourth class: Population between 11,000 and 40,000. Ten counties.
- Fifth class: Population between 4,000 and 11,000. Five counties.
- Sixth class: Population below 4,000. Four counties.

The county classes, for example, are used in the Utah legislature in crafting of legislation to distinguish between more urban and rural areas, such as important yet subtle distinctions in how revenue can be distributed. Usually, a bill intended to benefit rural counties would target the counties of the fourth, fifth and sixth class.

Under Utah Code (Title 17, Chapter 52a, Part 2), Utah counties are permitted to choose one of four forms of county government: a three-member full-time commission; a five or seven member expanded commission; a three to nine member (odd-numbered) part-time council with a full-time elected county mayor or a three to nine member (odd-numbered) part-time council with a full-time manager appointed by the council. 23 out of 29 counties are ruled by the standard three-member commission. Of the other six, Cache County was the first change in 1988 to a seven-member council with an elected mayor. Grand County adopted a seven-member council with appointed manager in 1992, followed by Morgan County in 1999 and Wasatch County in 2003. In 1998, Salt Lake County residents approved adopting a nine-member council with elected mayor that began work in 2001. Summit County adopted a five-member council with an appointed manager in 2006.

== Counties ==
| County | FIPS code | County seat | Est. | Origin | Etymology | Population | Area | Map |
|---|---|---|---|---|---|---|---|---|
| Beaver County | 001 | Beaver | Jan 5, 1856 | Part of Iron County | The many beavers in the area | 7,301 | 2,590 sq mi (6,708 km^{2}) | State map highlighting Beaver County |
| Box Elder County | 003 | Brigham City | Jan 5, 1856 | Part of Weber County | The many Box Elder trees in the area | 65,320 | 5,746 sq mi (14,882 km^{2}) | State map highlighting Box Elder County |
| Cache County | 005 | Logan | Jan 5, 1856 | Part of Weber County | Caches of furs made by Rocky Mountain Fur Company trappers | 145,000 | 1,165 sq mi (3,017 km^{2}) | State map highlighting Cache County |
| Carbon County | 007 | Price | Mar 8, 1894 | Part of Emery County | The vast coal beds in the county | 20,680 | 1,478 sq mi (3,828 km^{2}) | State map highlighting Carbon County |
| Daggett County | 009 | Manila | Jan 7, 1918 | Part of Summit and Uintah counties | Oliver Ellsworth Daggett (1810–1880), the first Utah Surveyor General | 934 | 697 sq mi (1,805 km^{2}) | State map highlighting Daggett County |
| Davis County | 011 | Farmington | Oct 5, 1850 | Part of Deseret Great Salt Lake and Weber counties | Daniel C. Davis (1804–1850), Mormon Battalion captain | 381,227 | 299 sq mi (774 km^{2}) | State map highlighting Davis County |
| Duchesne County | 013 | Duchesne | Jan 4, 1915 | Part of Wasatch County | Uncertain; likely origins are a Ute word translated "dark canyon", the French and Indian War site of Fort Duquesne (the county's initial settlement was also a fortress), the corrupted name of an area Indian chief, the name of Society of the Sacred Heart founder Rose Philippine Duchesne, the name of French geographer André Duchesne, or the name of French fur trapper and explorer Du Chasne | 20,856 | 3,241 sq mi (8,394 km^{2}) | State map highlighting Duchesne County |
| Emery County | 015 | Castle Dale | Feb 12, 1880 | Part of Sanpete County | George W. Emery (1830–1909), Governor of the Utah Territory from 1875–1880 | 10,177 | 4,462 sq mi (11,557 km^{2}) | State map highlighting Emery County |
| Garfield County | 017 | Panguitch | Mar 9, 1882 | Part of Iron County | James A. Garfield (1831–1881), President of the United States in 1881 | 5,256 | 5,083 sq mi (13,165 km^{2}) | State map highlighting Garfield County |
| Grand County | 019 | Moab | Mar 13, 1890 | Part of Emery County | The Grand River, since renamed to the Colorado River | 9,790 | 3,672 sq mi (9,510 km^{2}) | State map highlighting Grand County |
| Iron County | 021 | Parowan | Jan 31, 1850 | Original county of State of Deseret | Iron mines west of Cedar City | 67,141 | 3,297 sq mi (8,539 km^{2}) | State map highlighting Iron County |
| Juab County | 023 | Nephi | Mar 3, 1852 | Original county of Territory of Utah | A Native American word translated "thirsty valley" or "flat plain" | 13,567 | 3,392 sq mi (8,785 km^{2}) | State map highlighting Juab County |
| Kane County | 025 | Kanab | Jan 16, 1864 | Part of Washington County | Thomas L. Kane (1822–1883), U.S. Army officer who spoke in favor of the Mormon migration and settlement of Utah | 8,597 | 3,990 sq mi (10,334 km^{2}) | State map highlighting Kane County |
| Millard County | 027 | Fillmore | Oct 4, 1851 | Original county of Territory of Utah | Millard Fillmore (1800–1874), President of the United States from 1850 to 1853 | 14,057 | 6,572 sq mi (17,021 km^{2}) | State map highlighting Millard County |
| Morgan County | 029 | Morgan | Jan 17, 1862 | Part of Davis, Great Salt Lake, Summit, and Weber counties | Jedediah Morgan Grant (1816–1856), an Apostle of the Church of Jesus Christ of Latter-day Saints | 13,383 | 609 sq mi (1,577 km^{2}) | State map highlighting Morgan County |
| Piute County | 031 | Junction | Jan 16, 1865 | Part of Beaver County | The Piute tribe of Native Americans who lived in the area | 1,509 | 758 sq mi (1,963 km^{2}) | State map highlighting Piute County |
| Rich County | 033 | Randolph | Jan 16, 1864 | Part of Cache County | Charles C. Rich (1809–1883), an Apostle of The Church of Jesus Christ of Latter-day Saints | 2,687 | 1,029 sq mi (2,665 km^{2}) | State map highlighting Rich County |
| Salt Lake County | 035 | Salt Lake City | Jan 31, 1850 | Original county of State of Deseret | The Great Salt Lake, the largest terminal lake in the Western Hemisphere | 1,220,916 | 742 sq mi (1,922 km^{2}) | State map highlighting Salt Lake County |
| San Juan County | 037 | Monticello | Feb 17, 1880 | Parts of Kane, Iron, and Piute counties | Named for the San Juan River, a 400-mile (640 km) tributary of the Colorado river located in southern Colorado and Utah | 14,542 | 7,820 sq mi (20,254 km^{2}) | State map highlighting San Juan County |
| Sanpete County | 039 | Manti | Jan 31, 1850 | Original county of State of Deseret | Uncertain, possibly from a Ute Chief named San Pitch | 31,453 | 1,590 sq mi (4,118 km^{2}) | State map highlighting Sanpete County |
| Sevier County | 041 | Richfield | Jan 16, 1865 | Part of Sanpete County | The Sevier River, a 280-mile (450 km) river in central Utah | 22,827 | 1,911 sq mi (4,949 km^{2}) | State map highlighting Sevier County |
| Summit County | 043 | Coalville | Jan 13, 1854 | Part of Great Salt Lake and Green River counties | High elevations in the county, which includes 39 of Utah's highest peaks | 43,141 | 1,872 sq mi (4,848 km^{2}) | State map highlighting Summit County |
| Tooele County | 045 | Tooele | Jan 31, 1850 | Original county of State of Deseret | Uncertain, either from the Goshute Tribe Chief Tuilla or the Tules plant that grew in the marshes | 87,461 | 6,941 sq mi (17,977 km^{2}) | State map highlighting Tooele County |
| Uintah County | 047 | Vernal | Feb 18, 1880 | Part of Sanpete, Summit, and Wasatch counties | The Uintah band of the Ute tribe who lived in the area | 38,278 | 4,480 sq mi (11,603 km^{2}) | State map highlighting Uintah County |
| Utah County | 049 | Provo | Jan 31, 1850 | Original county of State of Deseret | Yuta, the Spanish name for the Ute tribe | 759,859 | 2,003 sq mi (5,188 km^{2}) | State map highlighting Utah County |
| Wasatch County | 051 | Heber City | Jan 17, 1862 | Part of Great Salt Lake, Green River, Sanpete, Summit, and Utah counties | A Native American word meaning "mountain pass", also the name of the Wasatch Range | 38,514 | 1,176 sq mi (3,046 km^{2}) | State map highlighting Wasatch County |
| Washington County | 053 | St. George | Mar 3, 1852 | Original county of Territory of Utah | George Washington (1732–1799), President of the United States from 1789 to 1797 | 213,670 | 2,426 sq mi (6,283 km^{2}) | State map highlighting Washington County |
| Wayne County | 055 | Loa | Mar 10, 1892 | Part of Piute County | Wayne County, Tennessee | 2,587 | 2,461 sq mi (6,374 km^{2}) | State map highlighting Wayne County |
| Weber County | 057 | Ogden | Jan 31, 1850 | Original county of State of Deseret | The Weber River, a 125 miles (201 km) tributary of the Great Salt Lake | 278,174 | 576 sq mi (1,492 km^{2}) | State map highlighting Weber County |

== Racial / Ethnic Profile of counties in Utah (2020 Census) ==
Racial / Ethnic Profile of counties in Utah (2020 Census)
Following is a table of counties in Utah by race/ethnicity. The majority racial/ethnic group is coded per the key below.

| Majority minority with no dominant group |
| Majority White |
| Majority Black |
| Majority Hispanic |
| Majority Asian |
| Majority Native American |

Racial and ethnic composition of counties in Utah (2020 Census) (NH = Non-Hispanic) Note: the US Census treats Hispanic/Latino as an ethnic category. This table excludes Latinos from the racial categories and assigns them to a separate category. Hispanics/Latinos may be of any race.
| County | Location of County | Total Population | White alone (NH) | % | Black or African American alone (NH) | % | Native American or Alaska Native alone (NH) | % | Asian alone (NH) | % | Pacific Islander alone (NH) | % | Other race alone (NH) | % | Mixed race or Multiracial (NH) | % | Hispanic or Latino (any race) | % |
|---|---|---|---|---|---|---|---|---|---|---|---|---|---|---|---|---|---|---|
| Beaver | | 7,072 | 5,717 | 80.84% | 23 | 0.33% | 70 | 0.99% | 32 | 0.45% | 21 | 0.30% | 8 | 0.11% | 135 | 1.91% | 1,066 | 15.07% |
| Box Elder | | 57,666 | 49,361 | 85.60% | 161 | 0.28% | 383 | 0.66% | 438 | 0.76% | 98 | 0.17% | 102 | 0.18% | 1,586 | 2.75% | 5,537 | 9.60% |
| Cache | | 133,154 | 109,376 | 82.14% | 1,045 | 0.78% | 620 | 0.47% | 2,303 | 1.73% | 660 | 0.50% | 422 | 0.32% | 3,652 | 2.74% | 15,076 | 11.32% |
| Carbon | | 20,412 | 16,645 | 81.55% | 50 | 0.24% | 199 | 0.97% | 63 | 0.31% | 29 | 0.14% | 58 | 0.28% | 691 | 3.39% | 2,677 | 13.11% |
| Daggett | | 935 | 881 | 94.22% | 1 | 0.11% | 0 | 0.00% | 1 | 0.11% | 2 | 0.21% | 2 | 0.21% | 19 | 2.03% | 29 | 3.10% |
| Davis | | 362,679 | 292,458 | 80.64% | 4,008 | 1.11% | 1,464 | 0.40% | 6,907 | 1.90% | 3,204 | 0.88% | 1,244 | 0.34% | 14,099 | 3.89% | 39,295 | 10.83% |
| Duchesne | | 19,596 | 16,736 | 85.41% | 21 | 0.11% | 875 | 4.47% | 60 | 0.31% | 39 | 0.20% | 47 | 0.24% | 533 | 2.72% | 1,285 | 6.56% |
| Emery | | 9,825 | 8,811 | 89.68% | 2 | 0.02% | 55 | 0.56% | 36 | 0.37% | 7 | 0.07% | 16 | 0.16% | 193 | 1.96% | 705 | 7.18% |
| Garfield | | 5,083 | 4,446 | 87.47% | 5 | 0.10% | 90 | 1.77% | 30 | 0.59% | 7 | 0.14% | 3 | 0.06% | 118 | 2.32% | 384 | 7.55% |
| Grand | | 9,669 | 7,481 | 77.37% | 65 | 0.67% | 330 | 3.41% | 80 | 0.83% | 11 | 0.11% | 62 | 0.64% | 414 | 4.28% | 1,226 | 12.68% |
| Iron | | 57,289 | 47,620 | 83.12% | 375 | 0.65% | 948 | 1.65% | 621 | 1.08% | 237 | 0.41% | 154 | 0.27% | 1,852 | 3.23% | 5,482 | 9.57% |
| Juab | | 11,786 | 10,781 | 91.47% | 11 | 0.09% | 89 | 0.76% | 32 | 0.27% | 41 | 0.35% | 10 | 0.08% | 248 | 2.10% | 574 | 4.87% |
| Kane | | 7,667 | 6,924 | 90.31% | 27 | 0.35% | 119 | 1.55% | 59 | 0.77% | 1 | 0.01% | 18 | 0.23% | 197 | 2.57% | 322 | 4.20% |
| Millard | | 12,975 | 10,636 | 81.97% | 15 | 0.12% | 100 | 0.77% | 141 | 1.09% | 13 | 0.10% | 27 | 0.21% | 269 | 2.07% | 1,774 | 13.67% |
| Morgan | | 12,295 | 11,562 | 94.04% | 12 | 0.10% | 31 | 0.25% | 57 | 0.46% | 0 | 0.00% | 9 | 0.07% | 286 | 2.33% | 338 | 2.75% |
| Piute | | 1,438 | 1,276 | 88.73% | 0 | 0.00% | 4 | 0.28% | 0 | 0.00% | 0 | 0.00% | 1 | 0.07% | 33 | 2.29% | 124 | 8.62% |
| Rich | | 2,510 | 2,329 | 92.79% | 11 | 0.44% | 1 | 0.04% | 2 | 0.08% | 4 | 0.16% | 1 | 0.04% | 65 | 2.59% | 97 | 3.86% |
| Salt Lake | | 1,185,238 | 800,914 | 67.57% | 21,976 | 1.85% | 7,205 | 0.61% | 50,241 | 4.24% | 21,194 | 1.79% | 5,537 | 0.47% | 46,083 | 3.89% | 232,088 | 19.58% |
| San Juan | | 14,518 | 6,038 | 41.59% | 32 | 0.22% | 7,186 | 49.50% | 34 | 0.23% | 51 | 0.35% | 26 | 0.18% | 404 | 2.78% | 747 | 5.15% |
| Sanpete | | 28,437 | 23,688 | 83.30% | 224 | 0.79% | 240 | 0.84% | 171 | 0.60% | 247 | 0.87% | 81 | 0.28% | 743 | 2.61% | 3,043 | 10.70% |
| Sevier | | 21,522 | 19,396 | 90.12% | 65 | 0.30% | 313 | 1.45% | 40 | 0.19% | 49 | 0.23% | 49 | 0.23% | 557 | 2.59% | 1,053 | 4.89% |
| Summit | | 42,357 | 35,108 | 82.89% | 163 | 0.38% | 67 | 0.16% | 723 | 1.71% | 42 | 0.10% | 155 | 0.37% | 1,362 | 3.22% | 4,737 | 11.18% |
| Tooele | | 72,698 | 58,199 | 80.06% | 436 | 0.60% | 445 | 0.61% | 511 | 0.70% | 637 | 0.88% | 282 | 0.39% | 2,666 | 3.67% | 9,522 | 13.10% |
| Uintah | | 35,620 | 28,726 | 80.65% | 90 | 0.25% | 2,277 | 6.39% | 157 | 0.44% | 97 | 0.27% | 116 | 0.33% | 1,323 | 3.71% | 2,834 | 7.96% |
| Utah | | 659,399 | 518,460 | 78.63% | 4,110 | 0.62% | 2,533 | 0.38% | 10,111 | 1.53% | 6,541 | 0.99% | 2,421 | 0.37% | 26,692 | 4.05% | 88,531 | 13.43% |
| Wasatch | | 34,788 | 28,168 | 80.97% | 141 | 0.41% | 67 | 0.19% | 347 | 1.00% | 41 | 0.12% | 65 | 0.19% | 913 | 2.62% | 5,046 | 14.51% |
| Washington | | 180,279 | 147,462 | 81.80% | 913 | 0.51% | 1,566 | 0.87% | 1,802 | 1.00% | 1,607 | 0.89% | 631 | 0.35% | 5,816 | 3.23% | 20,482 | 11.36% |
| Wayne | | 2,486 | 2,267 | 91.19% | 1 | 0.04% | 19 | 0.76% | 16 | 0.64% | 3 | 0.12% | 5 | 0.20% | 79 | 3.18% | 96 | 3.86% |
| Weber | | 262,223 | 193,889 | 73.94% | 3,209 | 1.22% | 1,394 | 0.53% | 3,603 | 1.37% | 948 | 0.36% | 1,014 | 0.39% | 9,424 | 3.59% | 48,742 | 18.59% |

=== State of Deseret counties ===
- Great Salt Lake County – original county created January 31, 1850
- Iron County – original county created January 31, 1850
- Sanpete County – original county created January 31, 1850
- Tuilla County – original county created January 31, 1850
- Utah County – original county created January 31, 1850
- Weber County – original county created January 31, 1850
- Davis County – created October 5, 1850, from portions of Great Salt Lake County and Weber County

=== County name changes ===
- Tuilla County, Deseret created January 31, 1850, re-created as Tooele County, Utah Territory on March 3, 1852.
- Great Salt Lake County, Utah Territory created March 3, 1852, name changed to Salt Lake County, Utah Territory on January 29, 1868
- Richland County, Utah Territory created January 16, 1854, name changed to Rich County, Utah Territory on January 29, 1868

== Former counties ==
There were ten counties in the Territory of Utah that were absorbed by other states or other Utah counties.

| County | Established | Superseded | Etymology | Present location |
|---|---|---|---|---|
| Carson County | January 17, 1854 | March 2, 1861 | Named for Kit Carson, an American frontiersman | Nevada |
| Cedar County | January 5, 1856 | January 17, 1862 | Named for the numerous cedar trees growing in the area (which are actually juniper trees) | Utah County |
| Desert County | March 3, 1852 | January 17, 1862 | Named for the surrounding desert | Box Elder County, Tooele County and Nevada |
| Greasewood County | January 5, 1856 | January 17, 1862 | Named for the greasewood plant growing in the area | Box Elder County |
| Green River County | March 3, 1852 | February 16, 1872 | Named for the Green River, a 730-mile (1,170 km) tributary of the Colorado River that runs through Wyoming, Colorado and Utah | Cache, Weber, Morgan, Davis, Wasatch, Summit, Duchesne, Carbon, and Utah Counties, and Wyoming and Colorado |
| Humboldt County | January 5, 1856 | March 2, 1861 | Named for the Humboldt River, a 300-mile (480 km) river in Nevada and longest river in the Great Basin | Nevada |
| Malad County | January 5, 1856 | January 17, 1862 | Named for the Malad River, the name being French for "sickly" | Box Elder County |
| Rio Virgen County | February 18, 1869 | February 16, 1872 | Named for the Virgin River (el Rio de la Virgen), a 160-mile-long (260 km) tributary of the Colorado River located in southern Utah and Nevada | Washington County, Nevada and Arizona |
| St. Mary's County | January 5, 1856 | January 17, 1862 | Named after the Mary's River, which was later renamed to the Humboldt River | Nevada |
| Shambip County | January 12, 1856 | January 17, 1862 | Goshute Native American Tribe word for Rush Lake | Tooele County |

== Bibliography ==
- Van Cott, John W. (1990). Utah Place Names. Salt Lake City: University of Utah Press. ISBN 978-0-87480-345-7.
