= La Sal =

La Sal may refer to the following places in the United States:

- La Sal Mountains, Utah
- La Sal, Utah, a census-designated place
- La Sal National Forest, Utah and Colorado

== See also ==
- La Salle (disambiguation)
