= Beaver National Forest =

Former national forest in Utah

Coordinates: 38°42′30″N 111°57′33″W

Beaver National Forest was established as the Beaver Forest Reserve by the U.S. Forest Service in Utah on January 24, 1906 with 261,593 acres (1,058.63 km^{2}). It became a National Forest on March 4, 1907. On July 1, 1908 Beaver was combined with Fillmore National Forest and the name was discontinued. The lands are presently included in Fishlake National Forest.
