= Chalk Creek Hieroglyphics =

Set of unknown hieroglyphics in Utah, US

- Rock art
- Location within Utah Location within the United States
- Coordinates: 38.947323°N 112.261117°W
- Location: Millard County, Utah

The Chalk Creek Hieroglyphics are a series of carvings of unknown origin in Fishlake National Forest, Utah, near the town of Fillmore. Some of the glyphs have been moved to the Fillmore Office Interpretive. These symbols are one of the most visited areas of the forest.

== History ==
The hieroglyphs were first discovered by two prospectors from Fillmore, Clifford Purcell and Rube Melville in 1939 during an attempt to locate iron ore. Purcell reported that the symbols were "full of lichen, full of green stuff." In his book, Faded Footprints, George Thomspon includes a picture of the hieroglyphs, but labels them as being from Clear Creek Canyon instead.

A plaque at the interpretive office reads, "Panels with similar symbols have been found throughout the Great Basin and as far west as the coast of California.”

Some of the glyphs were retraced by visitors to make them more visible.

In order to protect the hieroglyphs from the Halfway Hill Fire in 2022, Hannah Robinson from the Bureau of Land Management, along with a crew of firefighters, removed trees near the area and wrapped the symbols and nearby signs with fire protection fabric. Despite this, the glyphs were not affected by the fire at all, although protection measures still stay in place.

== Theories ==
Although no scientific reason has been found for the glyphs, some people think that the symbols lead to gold tablets from Utah's colonial days, although none have been found. Others believe that they are inscriptions by Spanish miners who are looking for gold.

== Hieroglyphs ==
The first of the glyphs discovered, in 1939, were arranged in four rows, with symbols such as human heads and hands being able to be seen. Signature Rock, a boulder which toppled from its initial location in 1965, has a yin and yang on it, along with an unidentifiable character.
