= Nebo National Forest =

American forest

Coordinates: 39.6978°N 111.8361°W

Nebo National Forest was established by the U.S. Forest Service in Utah on July 1, 1908, with 343,920 acres (1,391.8 km^{2}) from the consolidation of Payson and Vernon National Forests and part of Fillmore. It was headquartered in Nephi, Utah. On July 1, 1915, the entire forest was transferred to Manti National Forest. The lands presently exist in Manti-La Sal National Forest.
