= Monticello National Forest =

Former national forest in Utah

Coordinates: 37.8262°N 109.6716°W

Monticello National Forest was established as the Monticello Forest Reserve by the U.S. Forest Service in Utah on February 6, 1907, with 214,270 acres (867.1 km^{2}). It became a National Forest on March 4, 1907. On July 1, 1908, it was combined with La Sal National Forest, which was renamed La Salle National Forest for a short time. The lands presently exist in Manti-La Sal National Forest as the Monticello Section of the La Sal Division of the Manti-La Sal National Forest.
