= Rio Virgen County, Utah Territory =

Former county in Utah, United States

Rio Virgen County is a former county in the U.S. state of Utah. It was established by the Territory of Utah in February 1869.

== History ==
=== Iron County, Provisional State of Deseret; Washington County, Utah ===
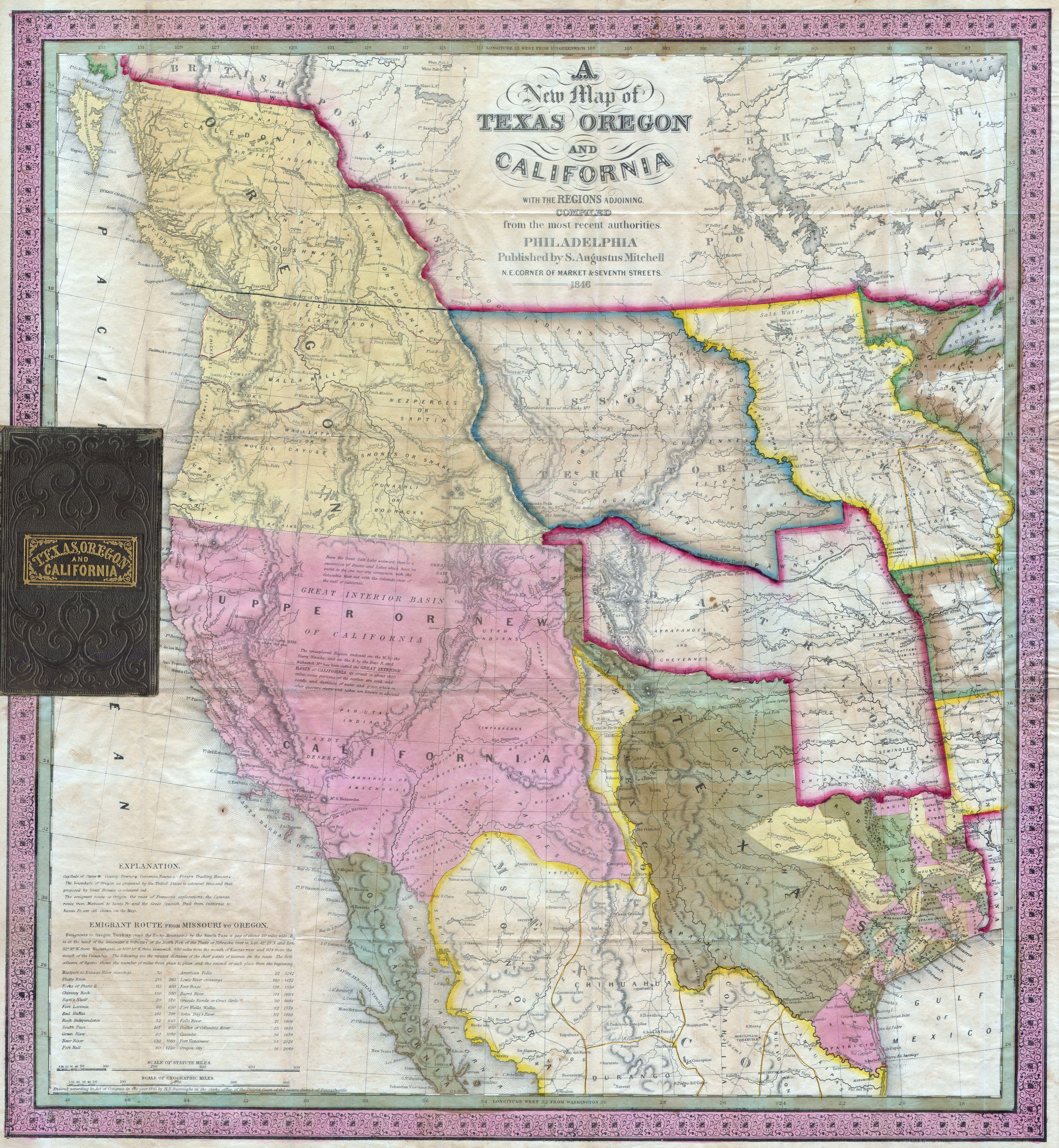
Map of Oregon, Mexican Alta California, and Texas, with Alta California shown in pink. Printed 1846, the year U.S. military began its occupation of Alta California

Latter-day Saints, in 1839, two years after their initial arrival in Salt Lake Valley, within then uncolonized eastern Alta California, created the Provisional "Deseret," proposed to include the watersheds both of the Río Colorado and "Great Interior Basin" . Deseret's provisional General Assembly in January 1850 established Little Salt Lake County (later that year renamed Iron County) with its southern boundaries' "extending south to the rim of the Basin." The U.S. Congress, in September, 1850, established Utah Territory, with its southern border instead at the 37th parallel.

Utah's legislature created Washington County in March 1852 as its southernmost county (and its northern boundary definitely defined in 1856 at "a line running east and west[...], through a point four miles north from the northeast corner of Fort Harmony").

=== Sought head of navigation on the Columbia ===
The Latter-day Saints' leader Brigham Young, sent an exploring party in 1855 to determine a possible head of navigation on the Colorado River – that is, to "get the soundings of the river and see if it were navigable for boats" to transport Utah produce and import supplies through a steamship port on the Colorado River. Simultaneously, Young directed a portion of this party to found the then small LDS outpost of Las Vegas. In 1858, during the Utah War, Young sent a second party "to explore the Rio Colorado and the country adjacent to it for suitable locations for settlements." In 1864, Young's saying, "We shall shortly want another path to bring home the [Latter-day] Saints, and we want to prepare for it[...]. The Colorado is not far from our southern settlements, only one hundred twenty-five miles from Saint George," Young outfitted and dispatched a Church mission that founded Call's Landing (Callville) on the Colorado.

=== Church mission on the Muddy River ===
The following year after the founding of Call's Landing, Young sent missions to found settlements on a Colorado River tributary, the Muddy River, starting in January 1865.

=== 'Arizona Strip's' creation in 1866 ===
Utah's legislature in February 1865 suggested that Congress grant the areas to Utah within Arizona Territory north of canyonlands of the Colorado River (the present-day Arizona Strip as well as the western portion of Mohave County then in Arizona Territory). This would have cede jurisdiction over the settlements on the Muddy River and at the Beaver Dam Wash on the Virgin River to Utah. Instead, in 1866 when Congress redrew Utah Territory's western border at 114° longitude, the Muddy River settlements were now below the Nevada Territory border; thus, even were it the case that Utah's border became redrawn southward, the Muddy River area would not be in Utah's confines.

Utah's legislature in February 1869 formed a runt "Rio Virgen County" from a small area nearby at very western part of Washington County (which it divided from the new county at Beaver Dam Wash, or at 115° longitude). St. Thomas, settled in 1865 was established as Rio Virgen County's seat. In 1870, upon completion of U.S. government surveys, Utah's ersatz Rio Virgen settlements acknowledged that they were in Pah-Ute County, Arizona Territory (1865–1871; whose area comprised those parts of Arizona Territory north of "Roaring Rapids" on the Colorado River and west of 113° 20” west longitude), with Pah-Ute County's seat at Callville.

=== Arizona's northwestern annexation to Nevada in 1867 ===
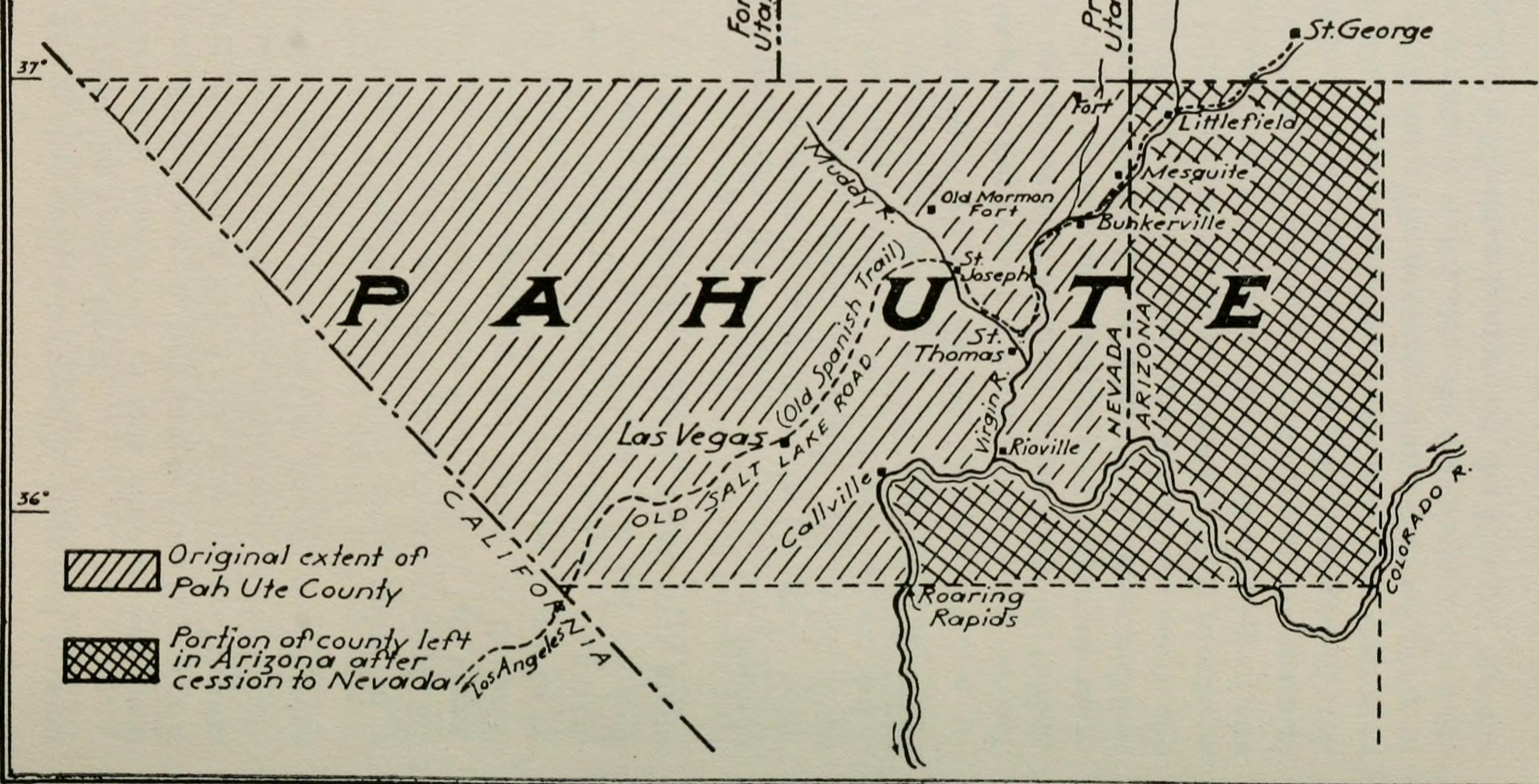
Former Pah-Ute County, Arizona Territory's western portion annexed into Nevada Territory in 1867 and its eastern portion that remained in Arizona Territory

Congress in 1867 annexed the portions of Pah-Ute County west of 114 degrees west longitude to Lincoln County, Nevada Territory. (Utah came to formally annex "all that portion of Rio Virgin County now remaining in the Territory" back into Washington County on February 16, 1872.)

== See also ==
- List of former counties in Utah
- St. Thomas, Nevada
- Pah-Ute County, Arizona
- Rio Arriba County, New Mexico
