= Uinta National Forest =

National forest in north-central Utah, United States

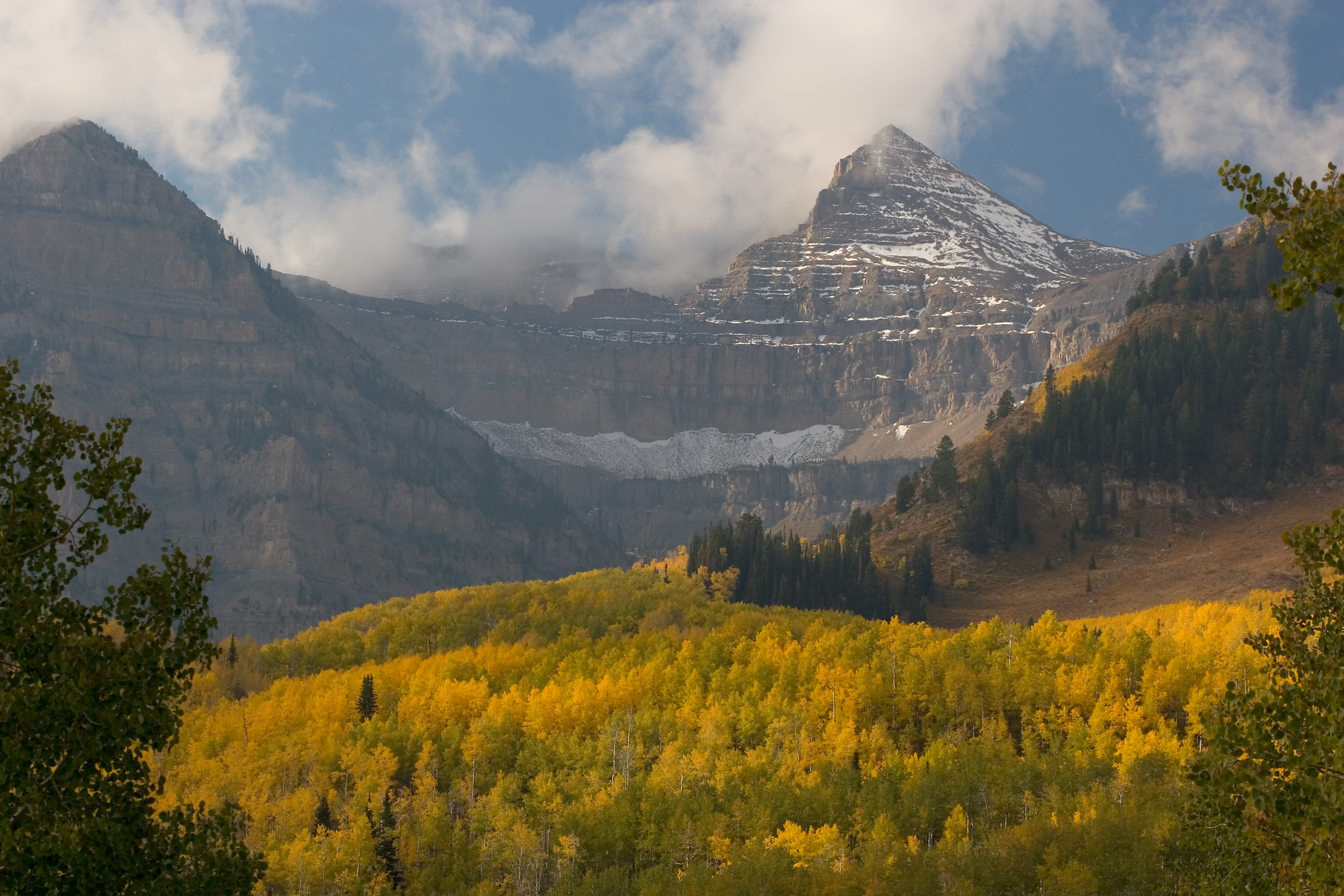
- Uinta National Forest

- Location within the United States
- Location: Juab, Sanpete, Utah, and Wasatch counties, Utah, U.S.
- Nearest city: Provo, UT
- Coordinates: 40°15′N 111°17′W
- Area: 880,719 acres (3,564.14 km^{2})
- Established: 2 February 1897
- Visitors: 3,200,000 (in 2006)
- Governing body: U.S. Forest Service
- Website: Uinta-Wasatch-Cache National Forest

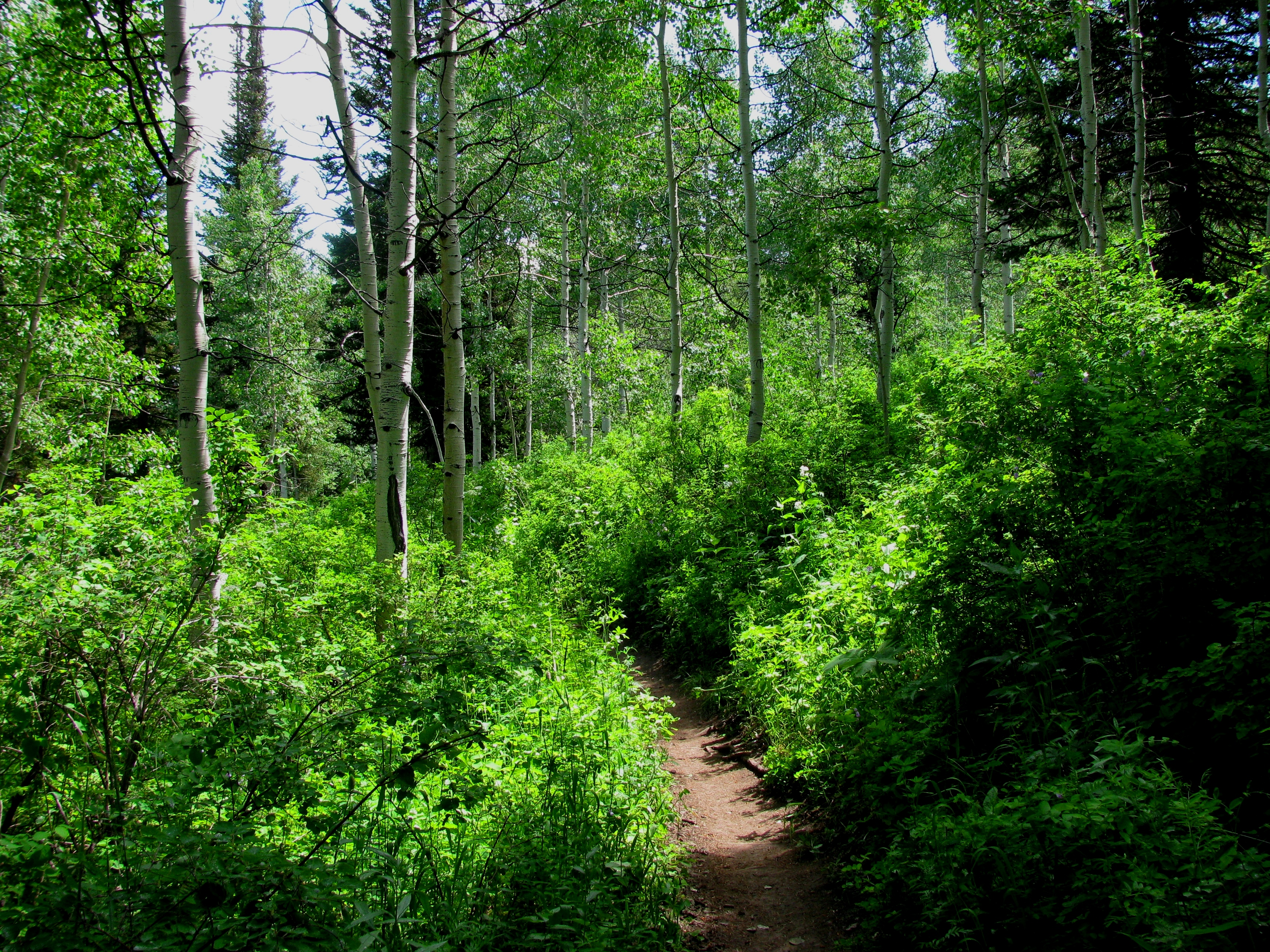
Trail into a grove of aspen and fir, north of Sundance in the Uinta National Forest

Uinta National Forest /juːˈɪntə/ is a national forest located in north central Utah, US. It was originally part of the Uinta Forest Reserve, created by President Grover Cleveland on 2 February 1897. The name is derived from the Ute word Yoov-we-teuh which means pine forest. Because of changes to the boundaries over the years, the Uinta Mountains are now located in the Wasatch-Cache National Forest. In August 2007 it was announced that the Uinta National Forest would merge with the Wasatch–Cache National Forest based in Salt Lake City, Utah, 50 miles (80 km) north of Provo, Utah.

The Uinta National Forest was headquartered in Provo, Utah, with four outlying district offices located in Pleasant Grove, Heber, Spanish Fork, and Nephi, Utah until August 2007. The Uinta National Forest is now managed as one unit along with the Wasatch–Cache National Forest as the Uinta–Wasatch–Cache National Forest. Managing 880,719 acres (1,376.1 mi^{2}; 356,414.3 ha), the Uinta National Forest is less than 45 minutes south of Salt Lake City and only minutes away from Provo, Utah. In descending order of land area it is located in parts of Utah, Wasatch, Juab, and Sanpete counties.

One of the most prominent features of the Uinta National Forest is the Mount Timpanogos mountain peak, towering over 11,750 feet (3,580 m) above sea level. However, the highest point in the Unita National Forest (as well as the entire Wasatch Range) is the nearby Mount Nebo at 11,928 feet (3,636 m) above sea level.

== Wilderness areas ==
There are three officially designated wilderness areas in Uinta National Forest that are part of the National Wilderness Preservation System. One of them lies partly in neighboring Wasatch National Forest.

- Lone Peak Wilderness (partly in Wasatch NF)
- Mount Nebo Wilderness
- Mount Timpanogos Wilderness

== See also ==
- List of national forests of the United States
- Uinta
