= Powell National Forest =

Former national forest in Utah

Coordinates: 38.0825°N 111.5006°W

Powell National Forest was established by the U.S. Forest Service in Utah on July 1, 1908 with the renaming of Aquarius National Forest for John Wesley Powell. On July 1, 1922 the eastern division of Sevier National Forest was added to Powell. On October 1, 1944 the entire forest was transferred to Dixie National Forest
