= Wasatch National Forest =

National forest in northern Utah and southwestern Wyoming, United States

Coordinates: 40°43′34″N 111°11′24″W

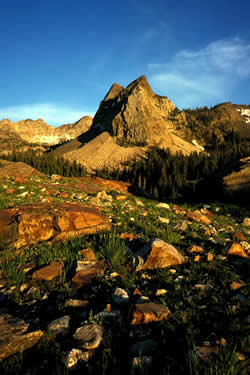
Sundial in the Twin Peaks Wilderness, Wasatch-Cache National Forest, Utah.

Wasatch National Forest was established as the Wasatch Forest Reserve by the U.S. Forest Service in Utah on August 16, 1906 with 86,440 acres (349.8 km^{2}) to the east of Salt Lake City and Provo. It became a National Forest on March 4, 1907. On July 1, 1908 Grantsville National Forest and Salt Lake National Forest were added. In 1973 Wasatch was combined administratively with Cache National Forest, creating Wasatch-Cache National Forest. In descending order of acreage, the Wasatch National Forest portion is located in Summit, Tooele, Salt Lake, Davis, Uinta (Wyoming), Duchesne, Wasatch, Morgan, Utah, Weber, and Juab counties in Utah except Uinta, which is in southwestern Wyoming. Its total area was 908,731 acres (3,677.50 km^{2}), comprising 56.44% of the combined Wasatch-Cache's 1,610,184 acres (6,516.18 km^{2}) as of 2008. There are local ranger district offices in Kamas and Salt Lake City in Utah, and in Evanston and Mountain View in Wyoming. Administrative headquarters reside with the combined Uinta-Wasatch-Cache National Forest in South Jordan, Utah.

== Wilderness areas ==
There are five officially designated wilderness areas within Wasatch National Forest that are part of the National Wilderness Preservation System. Two of these extend into neighboring National Forests, as indicated.

- Deseret Peak Wilderness
- High Uintas Wilderness (mostly in Ashley NF)
- Lone Peak Wilderness (mostly in Uinta NF)
- Mount Olympus Wilderness
- Twin Peaks Wilderness
