= Fillmore National Forest =

Former national forest in Utah

Coordinates: 38.9690°N 112.1482°W

Fillmore National Forest was established as the Fillmore Forest Reserve by the U.S. Forest Service in Utah on May 19, 1906 with 399,600 acres (1,617 km^{2}). It became a National Forest on March 4, 1907. On July 1, 1908 Beaver National Forest was added. On September 24, 1923 Beaver was transferred to Fishlake National Forest and the name was discontinued.
