= Fish Lake National Forest =

Former national forest in Utah

Coordinates: 38°45′57″N 112°05′15″W

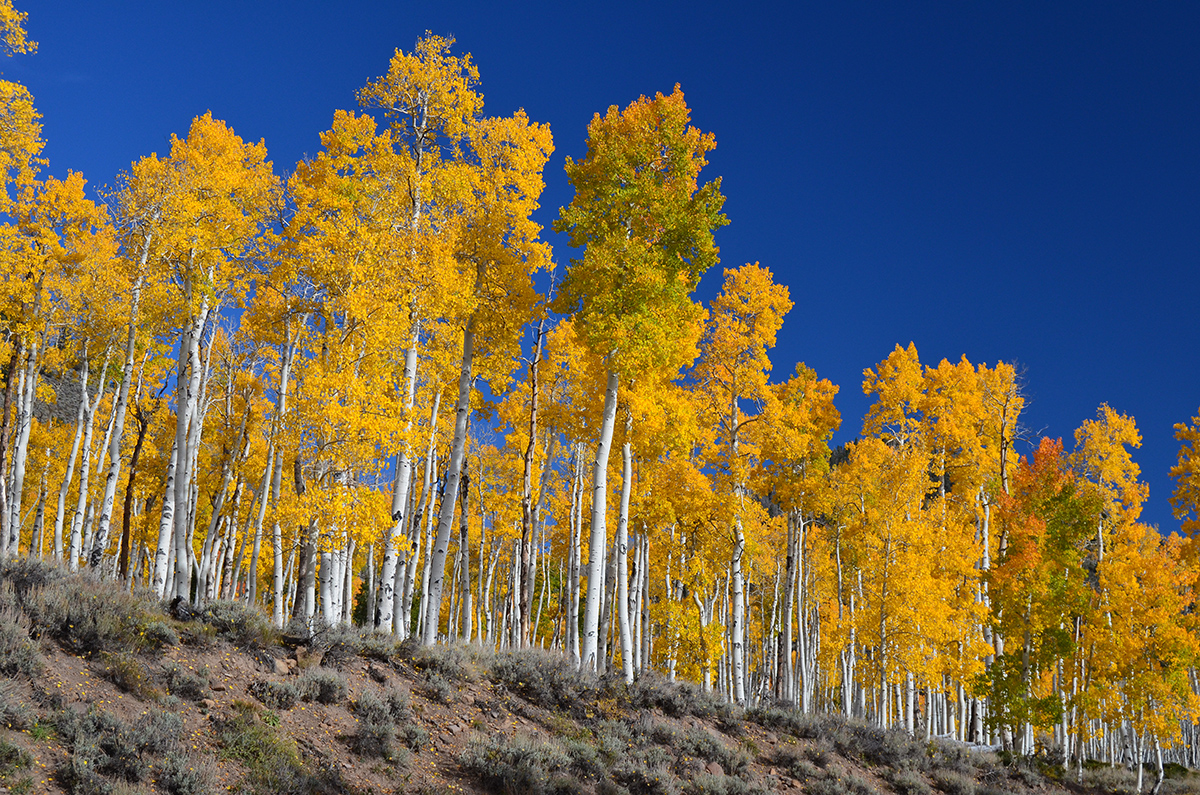
A grove of Populus tremuloides in the Fish Lake National Forest

Fish Lake National Forest was established as the Fish Lake Forest Reserve by the United States General Land Office in Utah on February 10, 1899 with 67,840 acres (274.5 km^{2}). After the transfer of federal forests to the U.S. Forest Service in 1905, it became a National Forest on March 4, 1907. On July 1, 1908 Glenwood National Forest was added and the name was changed to Fishlake National Forest.
