= Bear River National Forest =

Former National Forest of the United States

Coordinates: 41.650°N 112.015°W

Bear River National Forest was established as the Bear River Forest Reserve by the U.S. Forest Service in Utah on May 28, 1906 with 267,920 acres (1,084.2 km^{2}) by combining the Logan Forest Reserve with other lands. On March 4, 1907 it became a National Forest. On July 1, 1908 part of the forest was combined with Pocatello National Forest and the remainder was used to establish Cache National Forest. The name was discontinued. The lands are presently included in Uinta-Wasatch-Cache National Forest.
