= Grantsville National Forest =

Former national forest in Utah

Coordinates: 40.5997°N 112.4462°W

Grantsville National Forest was established as the Grantsville Forest Reserve by the United States General Land Office in Utah on May 6, 1904, with 68,690 acres (278.0 km^{2}). After the transfer of federal forests to the U.S. Forest Service in 1905, it became a National Forest on March 4, 1907. On July 1, 1908, Grantsville was combined with Wasatch National Forest and the name was discontinued. The lands are presently included in Uinta-Wasatch-Cache National Forest.
