= Logan Forest Reserve =

Former national forest in Utah

Coordinates: 41.7432°N 111.7964°W

The Logan Forest Reserve was established by the United States General Land Office in Utah on May 29, 1903 with 182,080 acres (736.9 km^{2}). In 1905 federal forests were transferred to the U.S. Forest Service. On May 28, 1906 the forest was combined with other lands to establish Bear River Forest Reserve and the name was discontinued. The lands are presently included in Uinta-Wasatch-Cache National Forest.
