= Manti National Forest =

Former national forest in Colorado and Utah

Manti National Forest was established as the Manti Forest Reserve by the United States General Land Office in Colorado and Utah on May 29, 1903 with 584,640 acres (2,366.0 km^{2}). After the transfer of federal forests to the U.S. Forest Service in 1905, it became a National Forest on March 4, 1907. On July 1, 1915 Nebo National Forest was added. On November 11, 1941, La Sal National Forest was added. On August 28, 1958 the name was changed to Manti-La Sal National Forest. Manti's lands are on the west side of the Colorado River in central Utah, between Manti and Price. In descending order of area, its lands are located in parts of Sanpete (50.3%), Emery (28.96%), Utah (12.59%), Carbon (4.11%), and Sevier (4.05%) counties. As of 30 September 2008 its area was 735,358 acres (2,975.9 km^{2}), representing 57.87% of the combined Manti-La Sal National Forest's total area. There are local ranger district offices in Ephraim, Ferron, and Price, whereas the administrative headquarters of the combined Manti-La Sal National Forest are also in Price.
