= La Sal National Forest =

National forest in the United States

Manti-La Sal National Forest
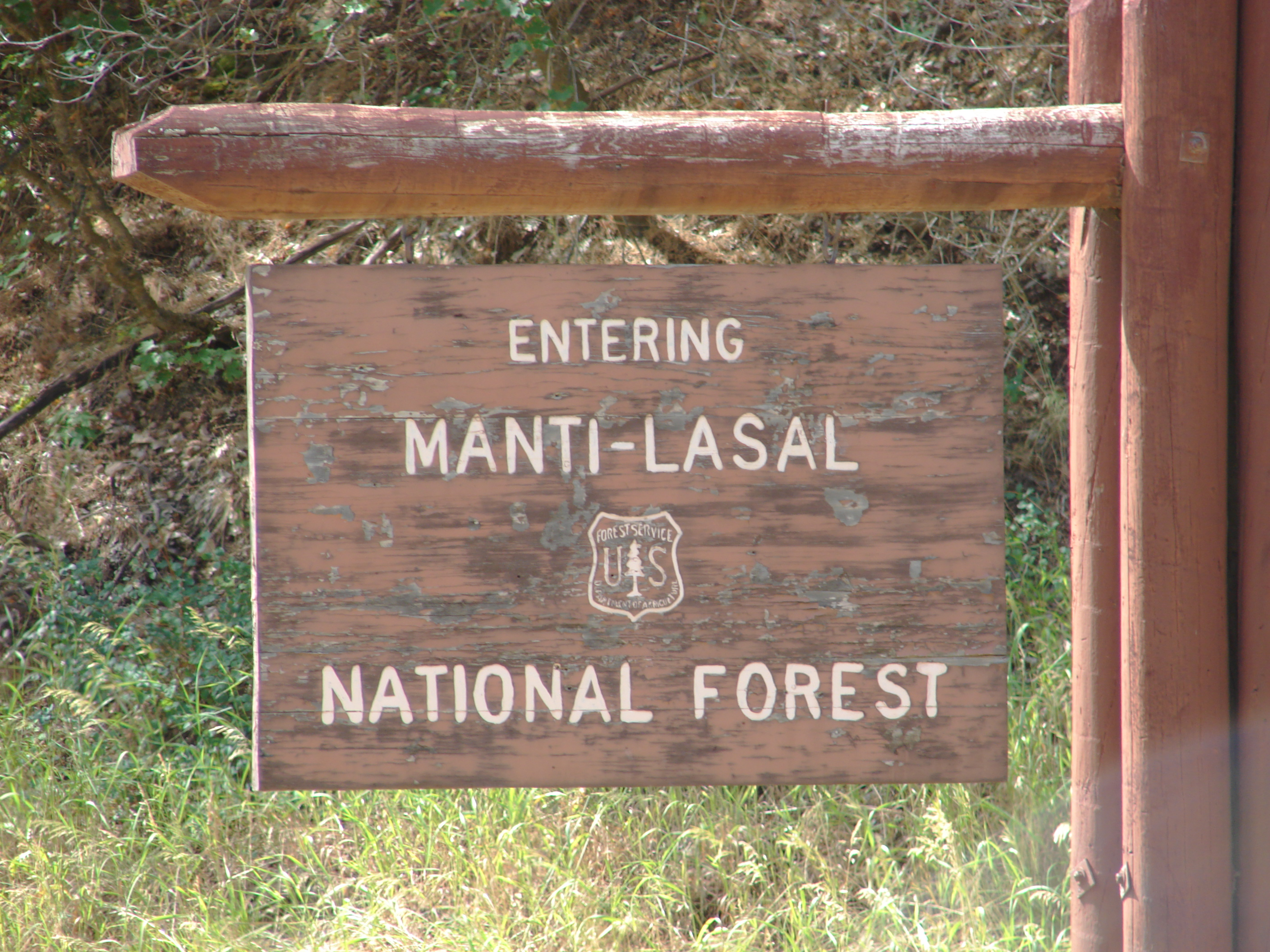

- Location within the United States
- Location: Utah and Colorado, USA
- Coordinates: 39.35129165649414°N 111.302490234375°W
- Area: 535,288 acres (2,166.23 km^{2})
- Established: 1906

La Sal National Forest was established as the La Sal Forest Reserve by the U.S. Forest Service in Utah and Colorado on January 25, 1906, with 158,462 acres (641.27 km^{2}), mostly in Utah. It became a National Forest on March 4, 1907. On July 1, 1908, it was combined with Monticello National Forest and renamed La Salle National Forest. On March 16, 1909, it was changed back to La Sal, by now with 474,130 acres (1,918.7 km^{2}). On November 28, 1949, the forest was transferred to Manti National Forest. On August 28, 1958, the name was changed to Manti-La Sal National Forest.

La Sal's lands lie to the east of the Colorado River in southeastern Utah and western Colorado, and include the La Sal Mountains and Abajo Mountains. The forest lies overwhelmingly in San Juan County, Utah (84.19%), but is also in Grand County, Utah (10.75%), as well as Montrose (4.215%) and Mesa (0.85%) counties in Colorado. Its total area as of 30 September 2008 was 535,288 acres (2,166.2 km^{2}). Its area represents 42.13% of the combined Manti-La Sal National Forest's total area. There are local ranger district offices in Moab and Monticello, although the combined Manti-La Sal National Forest's administrative offices are located more distantly in Price.
