= Salt Lake National Forest =

Former national forest in Utah

Coordinates: 40.7816°N 111.7534°W

Salt Lake National Forest was established as the Salt Lake Forest Reserve by the United States General Land Office in Utah on May 26, 1904 with 95,440 acres (386.2 km^{2}). In 1905 all federal forests were transferred to the U.S. Forest Service. On July 1, 1908 Salt Lake was combined with Wasatch National Forest and the name was discontinued. The lands are presently included in Uinta-Wasatch-Cache National Forest.
