= Sevier National Forest =

Former national forest in Utah

Coordinates: 37.8229°N 112.4310°W

Sevier National Forest was established as the Sevier Forest Reserve by the U.S. Forest Service in Utah on May 12, 1905 with 357,000 acres (1,440 km^{2}). It became a National Forest on March 4, 1907. On July 1, 1922 the entire forest was divided between Dixie National Forest and Powell National Forest and the name was discontinued.
