= Aquarius National Forest =

Former national forest in Utah

Coordinates: 38°05′N 111°30′W

Aquarius National Forest was established as the Aquarius Forest Reserve by the United States General Land Office in Utah on October 24, 1903, with 639,000 acres (2,590 km^{2}). Its establishment was also spurred by former President Theodore Roosevelt and Secretary of State John Hay, through a proclamation signed by both.

In 1905 federal forest lands were transferred to the U.S. Forest Service. On March 4, 1907, it became a National Forest, and on July 1, 1908, it was renamed Powell National Forest. The lands are presently included in Dixie National Forest. The forest included the Aquarius Plateau to the southeast of Capitol Reef National Park.
