= Shambip County, Utah Territory =

Coordinates: 40.3368885°N 112.4613423°W

Shambip County was a county in Utah Territory, United States from 1856 to 1862.

The county was created by the Utah Territorial Legislature in January 1856. It consisted primarily of the Rush Valley. Its county seat was located at the town of Shambip (on Clover Creek), which previously had been known as Johnson after Luke S. Johnson. (The town was later known as Clover before being incorporated into the town of Rush Valley.)

Shambip County was abolished in 1862 and absorbed by Tooele County, Utah.
