= Glenwood National Forest =

Former national forest in Utah

Coordinates: 38.9576°N 111.8614°W

Glenwood National Forest was established by the U.S. Forest Service in Utah on February 6, 1907 with 173,896 acres (703.73 km^{2}). On July 1, 1908, Glenwood was transferred to Fishlake National Forest and the name was discontinued.
