= Carson County, Utah Territory =

Legacy county in Utah, USA

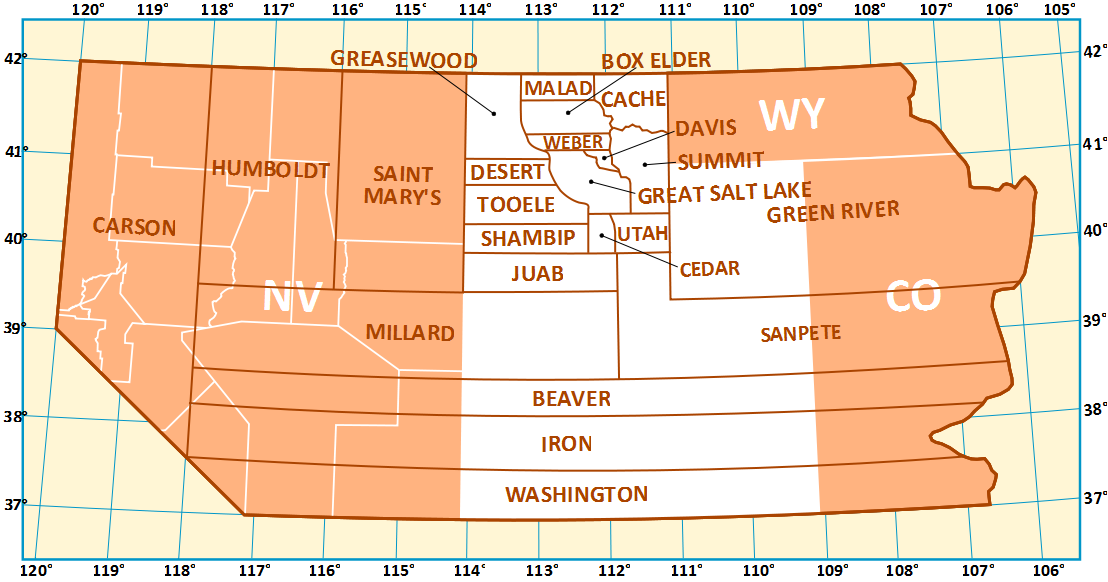
Utah Territory 1856 map

Carson County is a former county in the U.S. state of Utah. It was established by the Territory of Utah on January 17, 1854 and was dissolved on March 2, 1861. Its territory was taken from the counties of Tooele, Juab, Millard, and Iron. Its modern day location is taken up by Nevada.

This county was named for Kit Carson, an American frontiersman.

== Bibliography ==
- Van Cott, John W. (1990). Utah Place Names. Salt Lake City: University of Utah Press. ISBN 978-0-87480-345-7.
