= Fishlake National Forest =

National Forest in Utah, United States

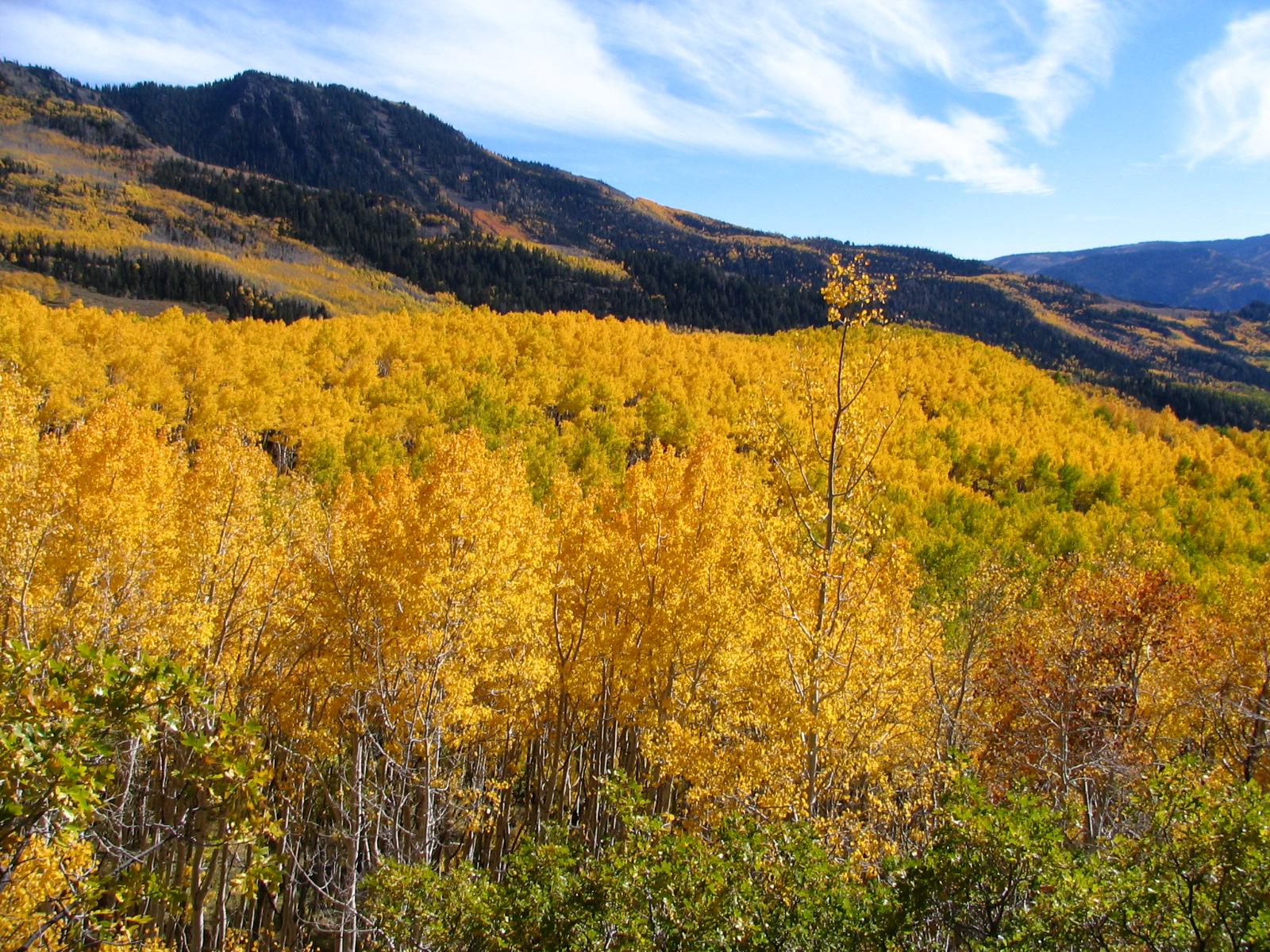
- Fishlake National Forest

- Location within the United States
- Location: Beaver, Garfield, Iron, Juab, Millard, Piute, Sanpete, Sevier, and Wayne counties, Utah, USA
- Nearest city: Richfield, UT
- Coordinates: 38°42′30″N 111°57′33″W
- Area: 1,461,226 acres (5,913.37 km^{2})
- Established: July 1, 1908
- Visitors: 500,000 (in 2006)
- Governing body: U.S. Forest Service
- Website: Fishlake National Forest

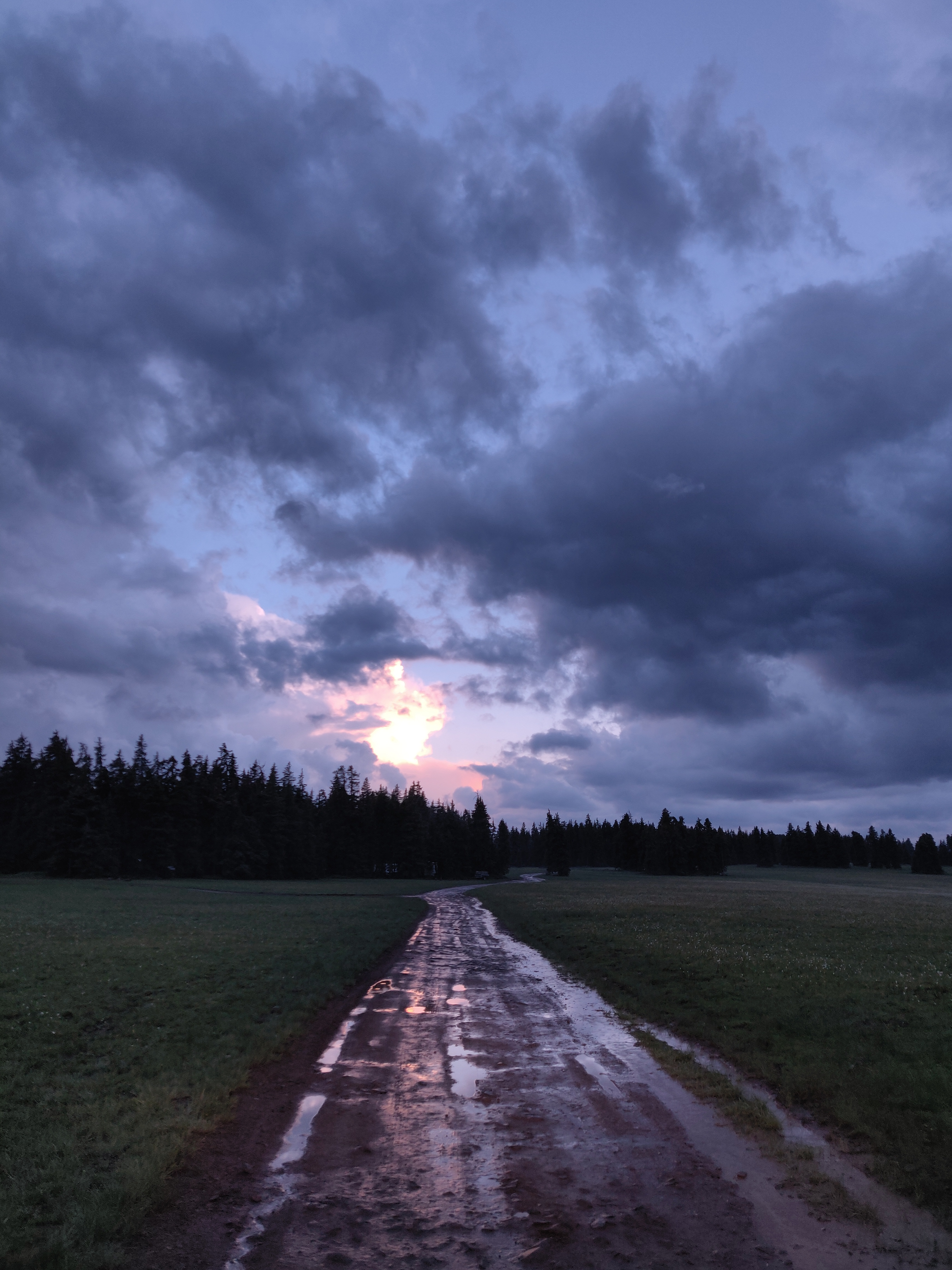

Fishlake National Forest is a U.S. national forest located in south central Utah. The namesake for the forest is Fish Lake, the largest freshwater mountain lake in the state.

== Wildlife ==
Animals that inhabit this forest are elk, shrews, deer, black bears, coyotes, various species of bats, moose, raccoons, two species of skunks, badgers, turkey vultures, two species of eagles, pika, snowshoe hares, various species of woodpeckers, pine marten, porcupines, four species of hummingbirds, beavers, kestrels, pronghorn, various species of owls, bobcats, minks, three species of fox, cougars, mountain lions, bighorn sheep, wild turkeys, and mountain goats.

== Geography ==
Established in 1908 from the merging of Fish Lake National Forest and Glenwood National Forest, the forest covers 1.5 million acres (6,100 km^{2}) and is split into four districts. The forest lies in parts of nine counties. In descending order of forestland area, they are Sevier, Millard, Piute, Beaver, Wayne, Juab, Garfield, Iron, and Sanpete counties. Forest headquarters are located in Richfield with local ranger district offices in Beaver, Fillmore, Loa, and Richfield. The national forest is the headwaters of Otter Creek, a tributary of the East Fork Sevier River. It is also home to the Chalk Creek Hieroglyphics.

Pando, a quaking aspen clonal colony, that is according to some sources, the oldest (80,000 years) and largest (106 acres, 13 million pounds) organism on Earth, is located in the Fremont River Ranger District of the National Forest, 1 mile southwest of Fish Lake on Utah route 25.

== Acquisition ==
Native water rights to Fish Lake were sold to the Fremont Irrigation Company on March 10, 1889, for nine horses, 500 pounds of flour, one steer, and a suit of clothes. Ten years later President William McKinley created a Forest Reserve which included Fish Lake.

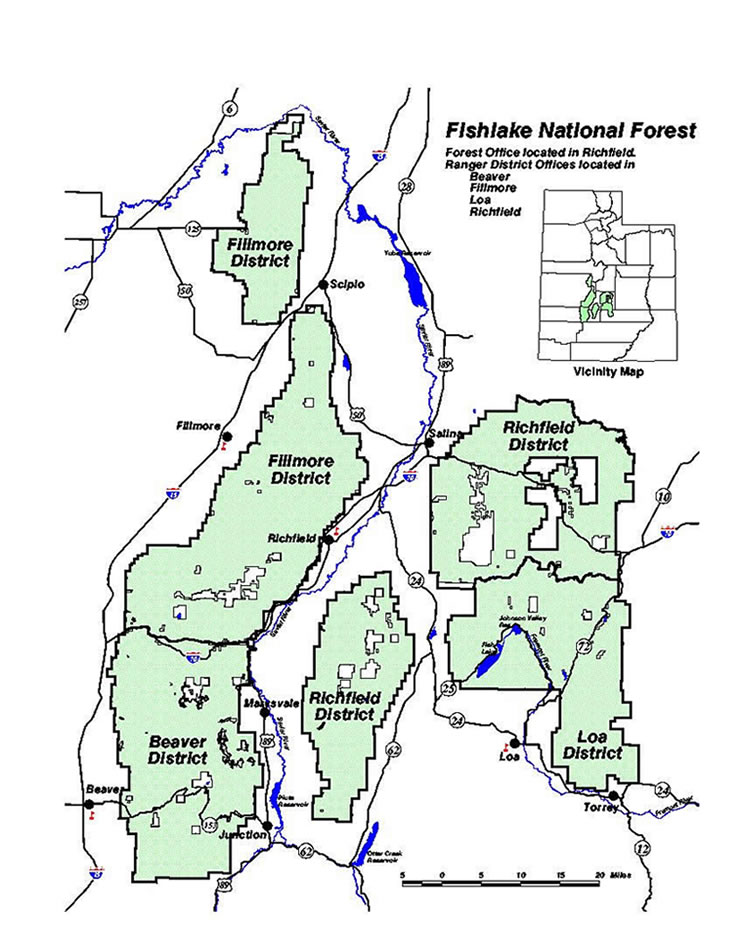
Fishlake National Forest map

== Gallery ==
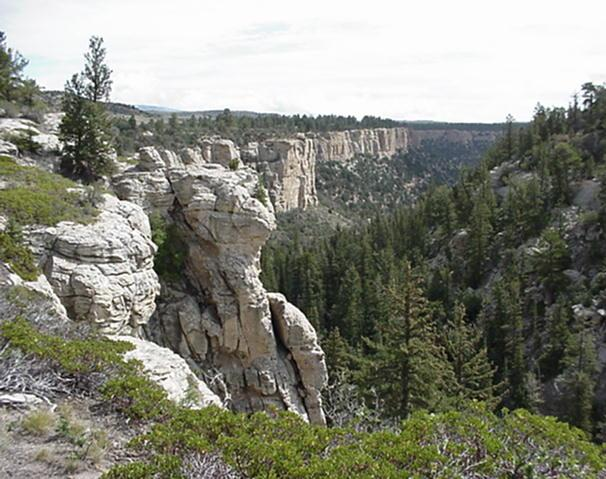
Quitchupah Canyon

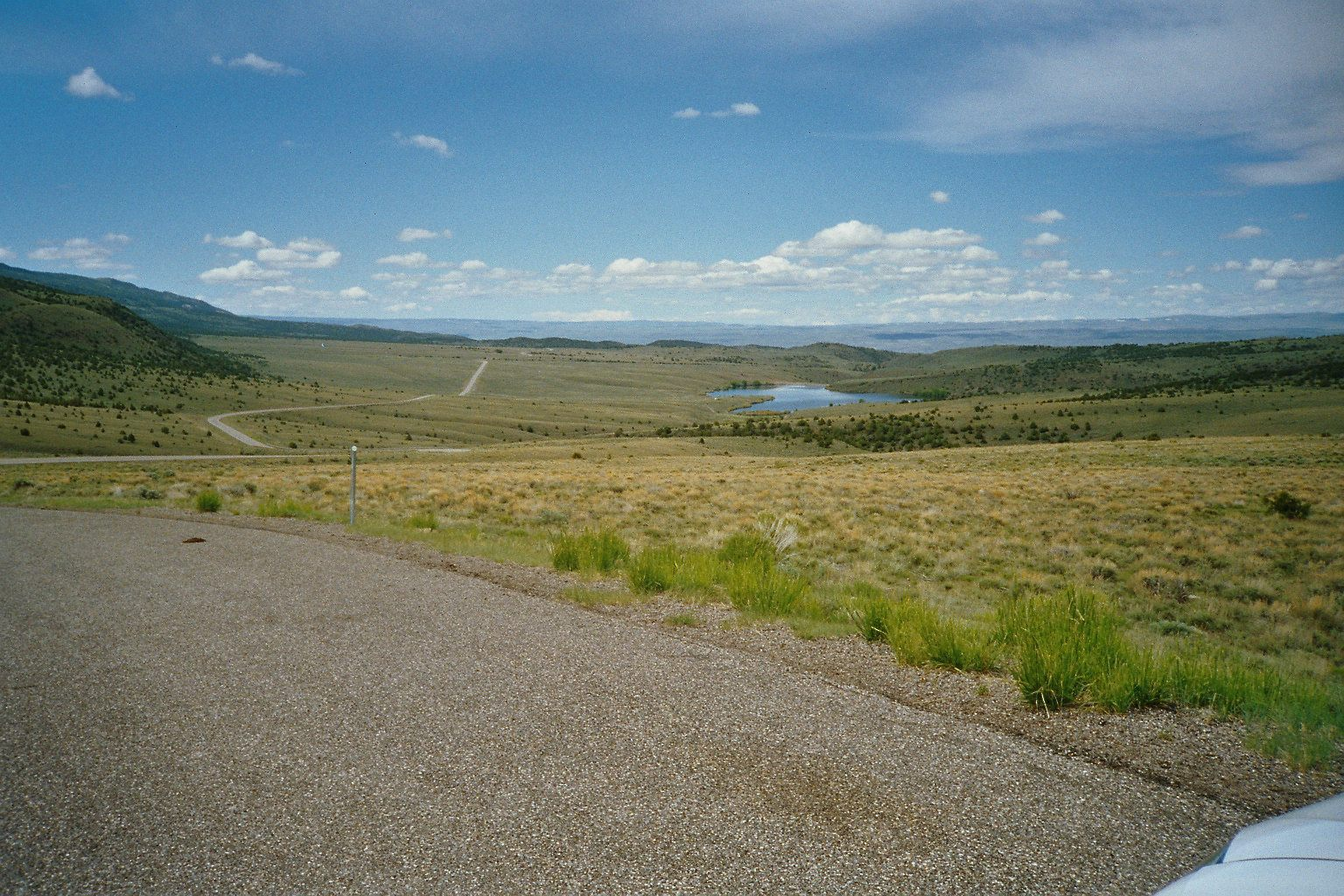
State Route 72 in Fishlake National Forest

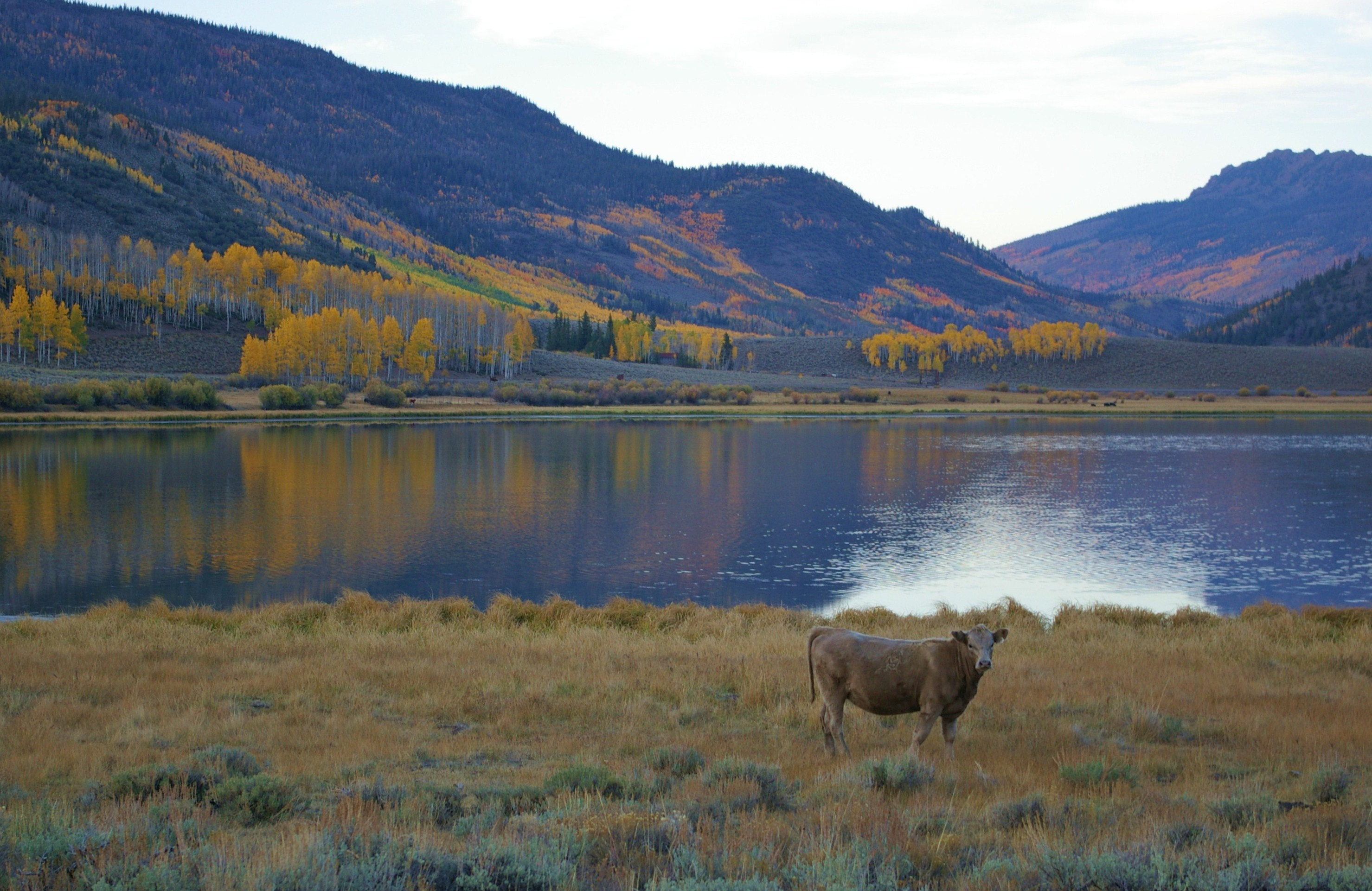
Fish Lake

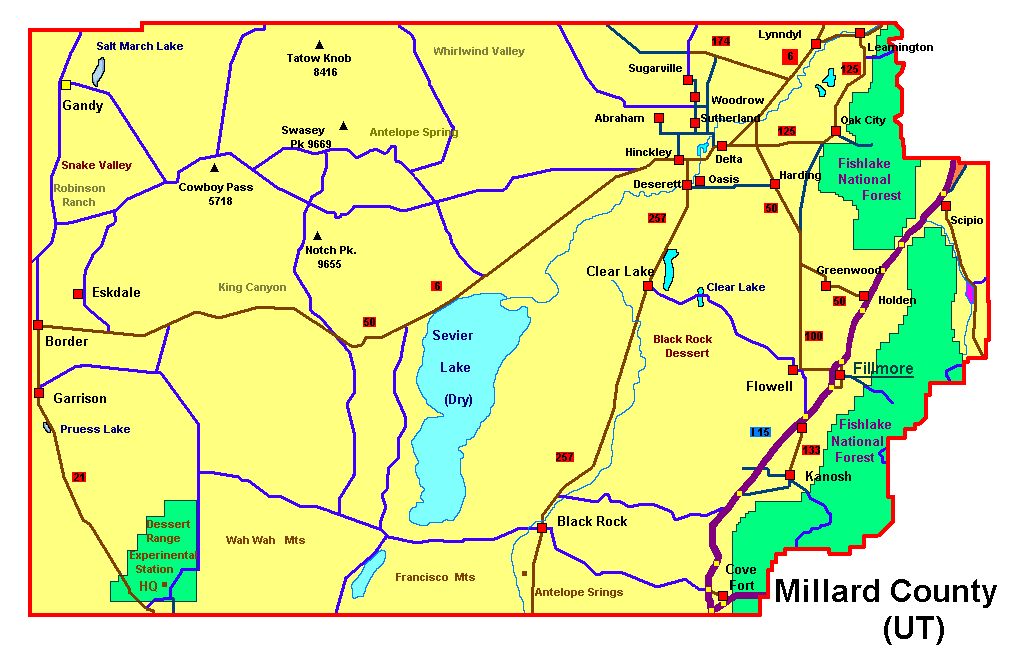
Map of Fishlake National Forest in Millard County

== See also ==
- List of national forests of the United States
- Fish Lake, Utah
- Fishlake Scenic Byway
