= List of former national forests of the United States =

A number of national forests in the United States have been renamed, disestablished, combined with other units or split apart during reorganizations of the U.S. Forest Service system. There was particular turnover during the first decade of the 20th century, when the forest system was reorganized several times, most notably on July 1, 1908. Many smaller holdings of fewer than 100,000 acres (400 km^{2}) were combined. In the 1920s a short-lived program created several National Forests from excess portions of military facilities, but within the next two years these transfers were reconsidered and rescinded.

== A ==
- Absaroka National Forest
- Afognak Forest
- Alabama National Forest
- Alamo National Forest
- Alexander Archipelago National Forest
- Apache National Forest
- Aquarius National Forest
- Arkansas National Forest
- Ashland National Forest

== B ==
- Baboquivari National Forest
- Baker City Forest Reserve
- Battlement National Forest
- Battlement Mesa National Forest
- Battlement Mesa Forest Reserve
- Bear Lodge National Forest
- Bear River National Forest
- Beartooth National Forest
- Beaver National Forest
- Bellevue-Savanna National Forest
- Benning National Forest
- Big Belt National Forest
- Big Burros National Forest
- Big Hole National Forest
- Bitter Root National Forest
- Black Mesa National Forest
- Black Warrior National Forest
- Blackfeet National Forest
- Blue Mountains National Forest
- Bonneville National Forest
- Boone National Forest
- Bull Run National Forest
- Bridger National Forest

== C ==
- Cabinet National Forest
- Cache National Forest
- Calaveras Bigtree National Forest
- California National Forest
- Cascade National Forest
- Cascade Range Forest Reserve
- Cassia National Forest
- Cave Hills National Forest
- Charleston National Forest
- Chelan National Forest
- Chenismus Forest Reserve
- Cheyenne National Forest
- Chiricahua National Forest
- Clark National Forest
- Cochetopa National Forest
- Cochetopah National Forest
- Colorado National Forest
- Columbia National Forest
- Coquille National Forest
- Crater National Forest
- Crazy Mountain National Forest
- Crook National Forest
- Crow Creek National Forest

== D ==
- Dakota National Forest
- Datil National Forest
- Diamond Mountain National Forest
- Dismal River National Forest
- Dix National Forest
- Dragoon National Forest
- Durango National Forest

== E ==
- Ekalaka National Forest
- Elkhorn National Forest
- Eustis National Forest

== F ==
- Fillmore National Forest
- Fish Lake National Forest
- Flathead Forest Reserve
- Florida National Forest
- Fruita National Forest

== G ==
- Gallinas National Forest
- Garces National Forest
- Garden City National Forest
- Gila River National Forest
- Glenwood National Forest
- Goose Lake National Forest
- Grand Canyon National Forest
- Grantsville National Forest
- Grover Island
- Guadalupe National Forest

== H ==
- Harney National Forest
- Hell Gate National Forest
- Henry's Lake National Forest
- Heppner National Forest
- Highwood Mountains National Forest
- Holy Cross National Forest
- Huachuca National Forest
- Humphreys National Forest

== I ==
- Idaho National Forest
- Imnaha National Forest
- Independence National Forest

== J ==
- Jackson National Forest
- Jefferson National Forest (Montana)
- Jemez National Forest

== K ==
- Kansas National Forest
- Kern National Forest
- Knox National Forest

== L ==
- La Sal National Forest
- La Salle National Forest
- Lake Tahoe National Forest
- Las Animas National Forest
- Lassen Peak National Forest
- Leadville National Forest
- Lee National Forest
- Lemhi Forest Reserve
- Lewis and Clarke Forest Reserve
- Little Belt National Forest
- Little Belt Mountains National Forest
- Little Rockies National Forest
- Logan National Forest
- Long Pine National Forest

== M ==
- McClellan National Forest
- Madison National Forest
- Magdalena National Forest
- Manti National Forest
- Manzano National Forest
- Marquette National Forest
- Maury Mountain Forest Reserve
- Meade National Forest
- Michigan National Forest
- Minam National Forest
- Minidoka National Forest
- Minnesota National Forest
- Missoula National Forest
- Moapa National Forest
- Monitor National Forest
- Mono National Forest
- Monterey National Forest
- Montezuma National Forest
- Monticello National Forest
- Mount Baker National Forest
- Mount Graham National Forest
- Mount Rainier Forest Reserve
- Mount Taylor National Forest

== N ==
- Natural Bridge National Forest
- Nebo National Forest
- Nevada National Forest
- Niobrara National Forest
- North Platte National Forest

== 0 ==
- Oregon National Forest
- Otter National Forest
- Ouray National Forest

== P ==
- Pacific Forest Reserve
- Palisade National Forest
- Palouse National Forest
- Park Range National Forest
- Paulina National Forest
- Payson National Forest
- Pecos National Forest
- Peloncillo National Forest
- Pend d'Oreille National Forest
- Pend Oreille National Forest
- Pike's Peak Forest Reserve
- Pikes Peak Timber Land Reserve
- Pinal Mountains National Forest
- Pine Mountain and Zaka Lake Forest Reserve
- Pine Plains National Forest
- Pinnacles National Forest
- Plum Creek Timber Land
- Pocatello National Forest
- Port Neuf National Forest
- Powell National Forest
- Priest River National Forest
- Pryor Mountains National Forest

== R ==
- Raft River National Forest
- Rainier National Forest
- Reserve National Forest
- Ruby National Forest
- Ruby Mountains National Forest

== S ==
- Sacramento National Forest
- Salmon River National Forest
- Salt Lake National Forest
- San Benito National Forest
- San Bernardino Forest Reserve
- San Francisco Mountains National Forest
- San Gabriel National Forest
- San Jacinto National Forest
- San Luis National Forest
- San Luis Obispo National Forest
- San Mateo National Forest
- Santa Barbara National Forest
- Santa Catalina National Forest
- Santa Rita National Forest
- Santa Rosa National Forest
- Santa Ynez Forest Reserve
- Santiam National Forest
- Savanna National Forest
- Selway National Forest
- Sevier National Forest
- Shenandoah National Forest
- Short Pine National Forest
- Sierra Madre National Forest
- Sioux National Forest
- Sitgreaves National Forest
- Slim Buttes National Forest
- Snoqualmie National Forest
- Snowy Mountains National Forest
- Sopris National Forest
- Stony Creek National Forest
- Sundance National Forest

== T ==
- Taos National Forest
- Teton National Forest
- Tillamook National Forest
- Tobyhanna National Forest
- Toquima National Forest
- Trabuco Cañon National Forest
- Trabuco Canyon National Forest
- Trinity National Forest
- Tumacacori National Forest
- Tusayan National Forest

== U ==
- Uintah National Forest
- Unaka National Forest
- Upton National Forest

== V ==
- Vegas National Forest
- Verde National Forest
- Vernon National Forest

== W ==
- Wallowa National Forest
- Warner Mountains National Forest
- Washakie National Forest
- Washington National Forest
- Weiser National Forest
- Wenaha National Forest
- Wet Mountains National Forest
- White River Plateau Timber Land Reserve
- Whitman National Forest
- Wichita National Forest

== Y ==
- Yellowstone National Forest
- Yuba Forest Reserve

== Z ==
- Zuni National Forest

== See also ==
- List of national forests of the United States
