= Long Pines =

Mountain range in Montana, USA

- Location within Montana

Highest point
- Elevation: 4,094 ft (1,248 m)
- Coordinates: 45°41′20″N 104°13′42″W

Geography
- Country: United States
- State: Montana

The Long Pines, elevation 4,094 feet (1,248 m), is a small mountain range southeast of Ekalaka, Montana, in Carter County.

This range is closely affiliated with three other small ranges in the area: the Ekalaka Hills, which are also located in Carter County, the East Short Pine Hills, which are located southwest of Buffalo, South Dakota, and the West Short Pine Hills, which are located south of Camp Crook, South Dakota.

Long Pines is the current designation of the former Long Pine National Forest, which was eventually consolidated into the Custer Gallatin National Forest. The majority of this land unit’s current 70,969 acres (287.20 km^{2}) lies within Carter County, Montana; 320 acres (1.3 km^{2}) of that total extend east into Harding County, South Dakota.

The Long Pines land unit is part of Custer Gallatin’s Sioux Ranger District, as are the aforementioned Ekalaka Hills, East Short Pine Hills, and West Short Pine Hills land units.

== See also ==
- List of mountain ranges in Montana
