= Ekalaka Hills =

- Location within Montana

Highest point
- Elevation: 3,720 ft (1,130 m)
- Coordinates: 45°49′30″N 104°27′35″W

Geography
- Country: United States
- State: Montana

The Ekalaka Hills, elevation 3,720 feet (1,130 m), form a small mountain range that lies east and south of Ekalaka, Montana, in Carter County.

This range is closely affiliated with three other small ranges in the area: the Long Pines, which are located southeast of Ekalaka, the East Short Pine Hills, which are located southwest of Buffalo, South Dakota, and the West Short Pine Hills, which are located south of Camp Crook, South Dakota.

Ekalaka Hills is the current designation of the former Ekalaka National Forest, which was eventually consolidated into the Custer Gallatin National Forest. The Ekalaka Hills land unit is part of Custer Gallatin’s Sioux Ranger District, as are the aforementioned Long Pines, East Short Pine Hills, and West Short Pine Hills land units.

== See also ==
- List of mountain ranges in Montana
