= Chiricahua (disambiguation) =

Chiricahua is a band of Apache Native Americans.

Chiricahua may also refer to:

- Chiricahua language
- The Chiricahua Mountains, in southeastern Arizona
  - Chiricahua National Park
  - Chiricahua National Forest
  - Chiricahua Peak
- UV-20 Chiricahua, a U.S. Army aircraft
- Chiricahua (moth), a genus in the family Geometridae
- The CH strain of Drosophila pseudoobscura – see Drosophila pseudoobscura § Chiricahua
