= Sopris =

Sopris may refer to:

- Sopris, Colorado, an unincorporated community
- Mount Sopris, a mountain in Colorado
- Richard Sopris, a Colorado politician

== See also ==
- Sopris National Forest
- Sopris phase
