= Baker City (disambiguation) =

Baker City is a city in and the county seat of Baker County, Oregon, United States.

Baker City may also refer to:

Things related to Baker City, Oregon

- Baker City Gold Diggers, a minor league baseball team
- Baker City Tower, a building in Baker City
- Baker City Municipal Airport
- Baker City Herald, a newspaper
- Baker City Forest Reserve, a former national forest

Other uses

- City of Baker School System, a school district in Baker, Louisiana, United States

== See also ==
- Baker (disambiguation) § Places
