= Datil =

Datil may refer to:

- Datil, New Mexico, a community and unincorporated town in Catron County, western New Mexico
  - "Datil" (rocket launch facility), the launch site of the MGM-29 Sergeant intermediate-range ballistic missiles, in New Mexico
- Datil pepper, a variety of yellow lantern chile peppers (Capsicum sinense)
- Datil-Mogollon Section, a physiographic subdivision of Colorado Plateau Province (western New Mexico and eastern Arizona)
- Mogollon-Datil volcanic field, a large silicic volcanic field in western New Mexico (Mogollon Mountains—town of Datil area)
- Datil National Forest, established 1908, merged in 1931, name discontinued
