= Peloncillo =

Peloncillo refers to:

- Peloncillo National Forest, formerly of southeast Arizona, bordering New Mexico
- Peloncillo Mountains (Cochise County), in northeast Cochise County, Arizona
- Peloncillo Mountains (Hidalgo County), in southwest Hidalgo County, New Mexico
