= Short Pine National Forest =

Former national forest in South Dakota

Coordinates: 45°21′N 103°42′W

Short Pine National Forest was established as the Short Pine Forest Reserve in South Dakota on July 22, 1905, with 19,040 acres (77.1 km^{2}). It became Short Pine National Forest on March 4, 1907.

On July 1, 1908, Short Pine National Forest along with Ekalaka National Forest and Long Pine National Forest in southeastern Montana (the latter two comprising 145,253 acres (587.82 km^{2})), as well as Cave Hills National Forest and Slim Buttes National Forest in northwestern South Dakota (85,360 acres (345.4 km^{2}) total), were consolidated to form Sioux National Forest (249,653 acres (1,010.31 km^{2})).

On January 13, 1920, Sioux National Forest was transferred to Custer National Forest, and in 2014, Custer National Forest merged with Gallatin National Forest. Following this merger, all land units formerly comprising Sioux National Forest, including the former Short Pine National Forest, are now under the jurisdiction of the Sioux Ranger District of the Custer Gallatin National Forest.

Today, the former Short Pine National Forest consists of the East Short Pine Hills (southwest of Buffalo, South Dakota) and the West Short Pine Hills (south of Camp Crook, South Dakota), both within the Custer Gallatin National Forest Sioux Ranger District.
