= Gold Creek Ranger Station =

- U.S. National Register of Historic Places
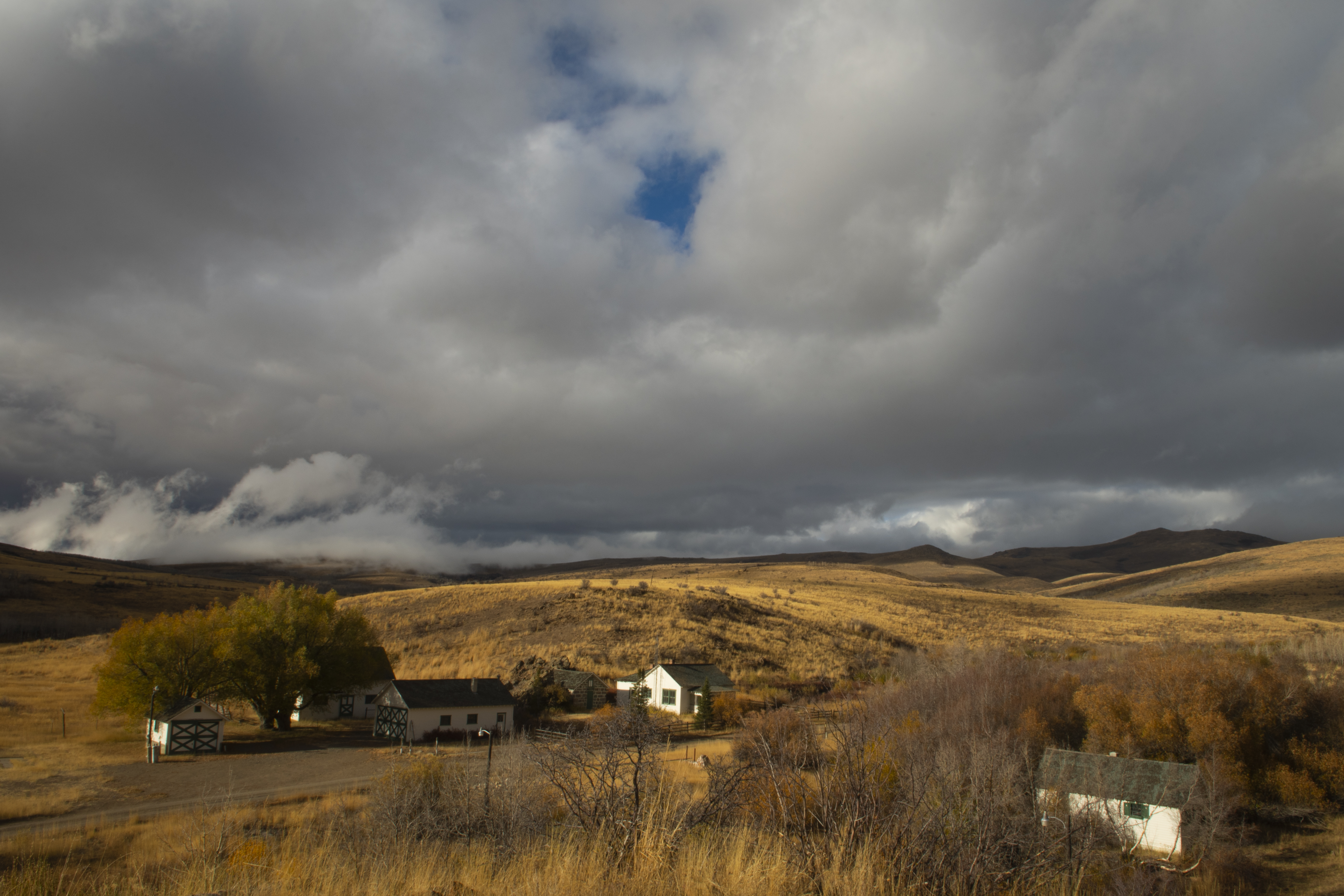

- Location within Nevada Location within the United States
- Nearest city: Mountain City, Nevada
- Coordinates: 41°45′4″N 115°40′29″W
- Area: 6 acres (2.4 ha)
- Built: 1910
- Architect: USFS Regional Office; Civilian Conservation Corps
- NRHP reference No.: 92001187
- Added to NRHP: September 15, 1992

The Gold Creek Ranger Station is located in Humboldt-Toiyabe National Forest in Elko County, Nevada, USA. It was built in 1910 to administer the Ruby Mountains Forest Reserve, which became Humboldt National Forest. The compound was later expanded by labor provided by the Civilian Conservation Corps.

The ranger station comprises nine wood-frame buildings that are representative of the Bungalow/Craftsman architectural style employed by the U.S. Forest Service in its administrative facilities from 1910 to 1940. The original ranger station was built in 1910 as a combination residence and office. Supporting structures included a barn, root cellar and privy. The main building was expanded in 1915, when it was functioning as the administrative headquarters for the entire Ruby Mountains reserve. The barn was removed in the 1920s and was eventually replaced by a shed covered with corrugated metal, possibly re-using the barn's timbers. The root cellar was expanded in the 1930s by CCC labor, using faced stone from the nearby Hammond Mine.

A new barn was built in 1934. The two story wood-frame building originally accommodated four horses, but was remodeled in the 1970s to serve as a bunkhouse for Youth Conservation Corps volunteers. A wood frame combination garage and office building conforming to Forest Service Plan 1111 was built in 1933-34 and altered to include office space in 1958 and 1963. In the 1970s it was converted to a kitchen-dining hall for the YCC. In 1938 the CCC built a gas and oil house.

The compound also includes three tourist cabins. Cabin 5 was built to Forest Service Plan 99 at another site and was moved to Gold Creek. It measures 12.52 by 16.25 feet (3.82 by 4.95 m). Cabin 8 matches Cabin 5, and was also moved to the site from an unknown location. Cabin 9 was built to Forest Service Plan 21 at another site and was joined to another structure when it was moved to Gold Creek. It measures 26 feet (7.9 m) by 33 feet (10 m).

The Gold Creek Ranger Station was placed on the National Register of Historic Places on September 15, 1992.
