= Cumero Fire =

2018 wildfire in Arizona, United States

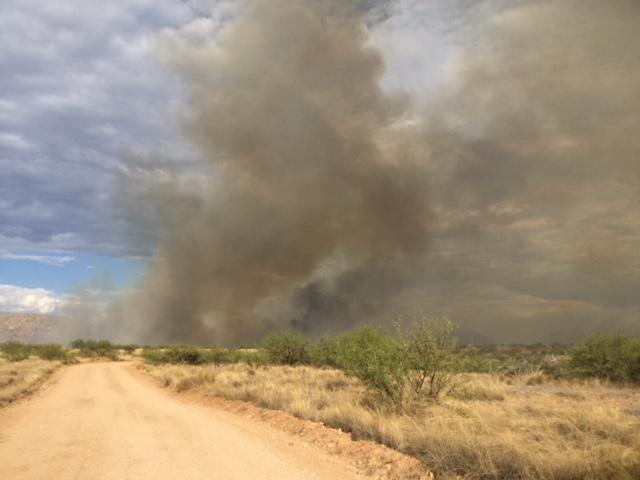
- Smoke from Cumero Fire on July 6, 2018
- Date: July 5–10, 2018
- Location: Pima County, Arizona, United States; Buenos Aires National Wildlife Refuge, Mexico
- Coordinates: 31.454°N 111.447°W

Statistics
- Burned area: 4,000 acres (1,600 ha; 6.3 sq mi)

Impacts
- Cost: $500,000

Map
- Location within Arizona Location within the United States

The Cumero Fire was a wildfire that burned 4,000 acres (1,600 ha) in Pima County, Arizona, and Sonora, Mexico. The fire was detected on July 5, 2018, burning in the Coronado National Forest near the Mexico–United States border. The fire was contained on July 8 and continued to burn until July 10. No structures were destroyed or damaged by the Cumero Fire, nor was a cause for the fire determined.

== Fire ==
On July 5, 2018, smoke was spotted rising from Mount Cumero, near Sasabe, Arizona, near the Mexico–United States border and within the Coronado National Forest. By 6:00 PM (Mountain Time), three fire crews supported by five helicopters were on scene attempting suppression of the Cumero Fire. By the next day, the fire had grown to 3,825 acres (1,548 ha)—within the United States and Mexico—but firefighters made progress in suppressing the fire, estimating its spread to be 40% contained. On July 7, the fire expanded into the Buenos Aires National Wildlife Refuge and to a size of 3,825 acres (1,548 ha), then to 3,925 acres (1,588 ha) on July 8, but was by then 80% contained. The fire continued to burn in containment until July 10.

== Aftermath ==
The Cumero Fire burned 4,000 acres (1,600 ha) over five days in the United States and Mexico and cost $500,000 (equivalent to $641,068 in 2025) to suppress. No structures were destroyed or damaged.

No cause for the fire was determined.
