= Battlement Mesa Forest Reserve =

Former national forest in Colorado

Coordinates: 39°22′23″N 107°53′47″W

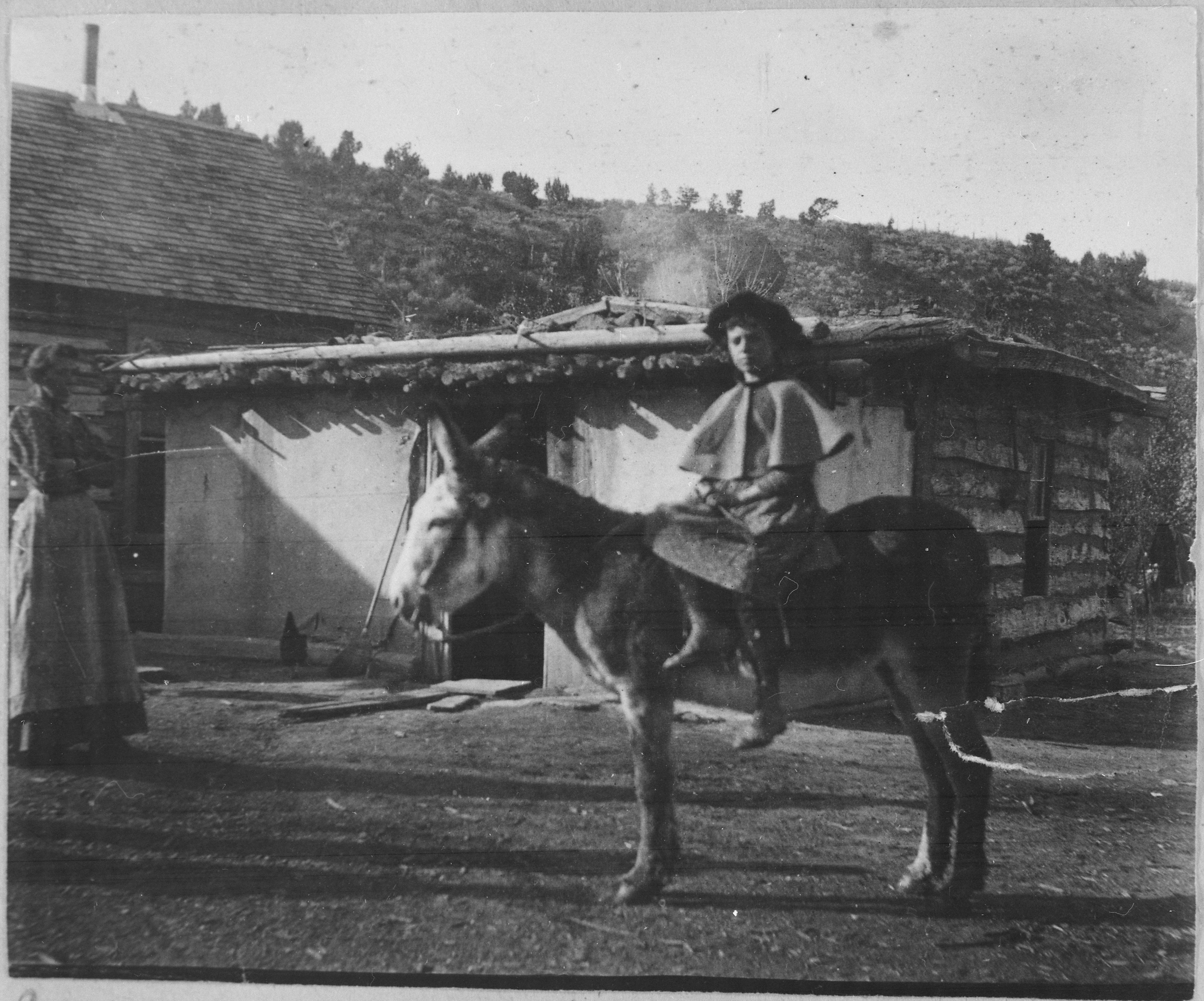
Rancher's daughter heads off to school, Battlement Mesa Reserve, c. 1898

Battlement Mesa Forest Reserve was established by the United States General Land Office in Colorado on December 24, 1892, with 858,240 acres (3,473.2 km^{2}). In 1905 all federal forests were transferred to the U.S. Forest Service. On July 1, 1908, part of the forest was combined with Holy Cross National Forest, part was renamed Battlement National Forest, and the original name was discontinued. The lands are presently included in White River National Forest and Grand Mesa National Forest.
