= Garces National Forest =

Former name for three National Forests

Coordinates: 32°N 110°W

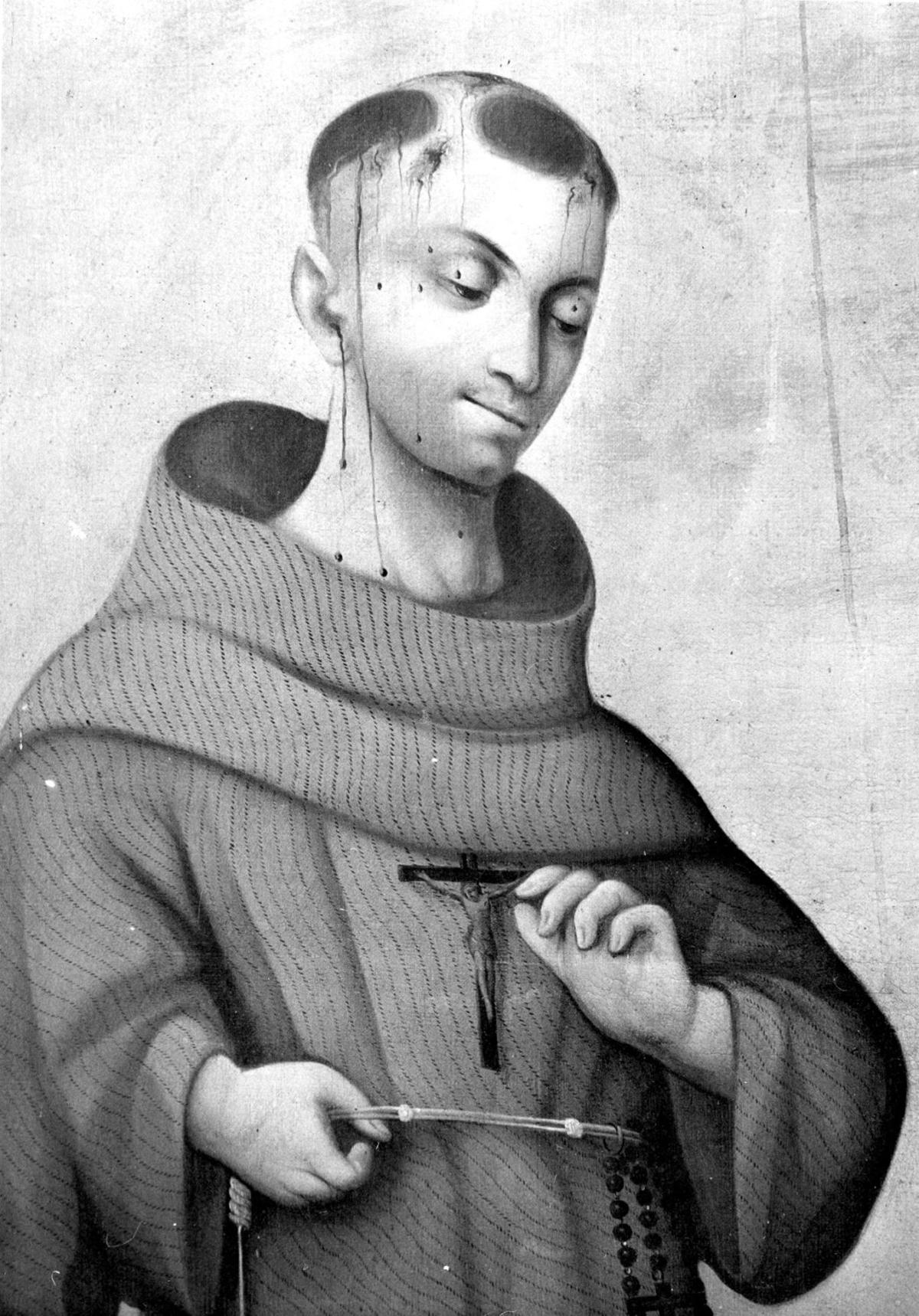
Garces National Forest is named for Spanish priest Francisco Garcés.

Garces National Forest was established by the U.S. Forest Service in Arizona on July 1, 1908 with 78,480 acres (317.6 km^{2}) from portions of Baboquivari, Tumacacori and Huachuca National Forests. It was named in honor of Franciscan missionary Father Francisco Garcés – an early explorer of southwestern North America including Arizona and southern California. On July 1, 1911 the forest was combined with Coronado National Forest and the name was discontinued.
