= Minam National Forest =

Former national forest in Oregon

Coordinates: 45.151°N 117.422°W

Minam National Forest was first established in Oregon on July 1, 1911, with 448,330 acres (1,814.3 km^{2}) from part of Wallowa National Forest. On June 20, 1920, it was transferred to the Whitman National Forest and the name was discontinued. Its lands exist now as part of Wallowa–Whitman National Forest
