= Cochetopah National Forest =

Former national forest in Colorado

Coordinates: 38.15534°N 106.65036°W

Cochetopah National Forest was established as the Cochetopah Forest Reserve in Colorado on June 13, 1905 with 1,133,330 acres (4,586.4 km^{2}). It became a National Forest on March 4, 1907. On July 1, 1908 it was renamed Cochetopa National Forest and exchanged land with Leadville National Forest, ceding land to Rio Grande National Forest and Gunnison National Forest. Its lands exist now as portions of San Isabel, Gunnison and Rio Grande National Forests.
