= Custer Gallatin National Forest =

Custer National Forest
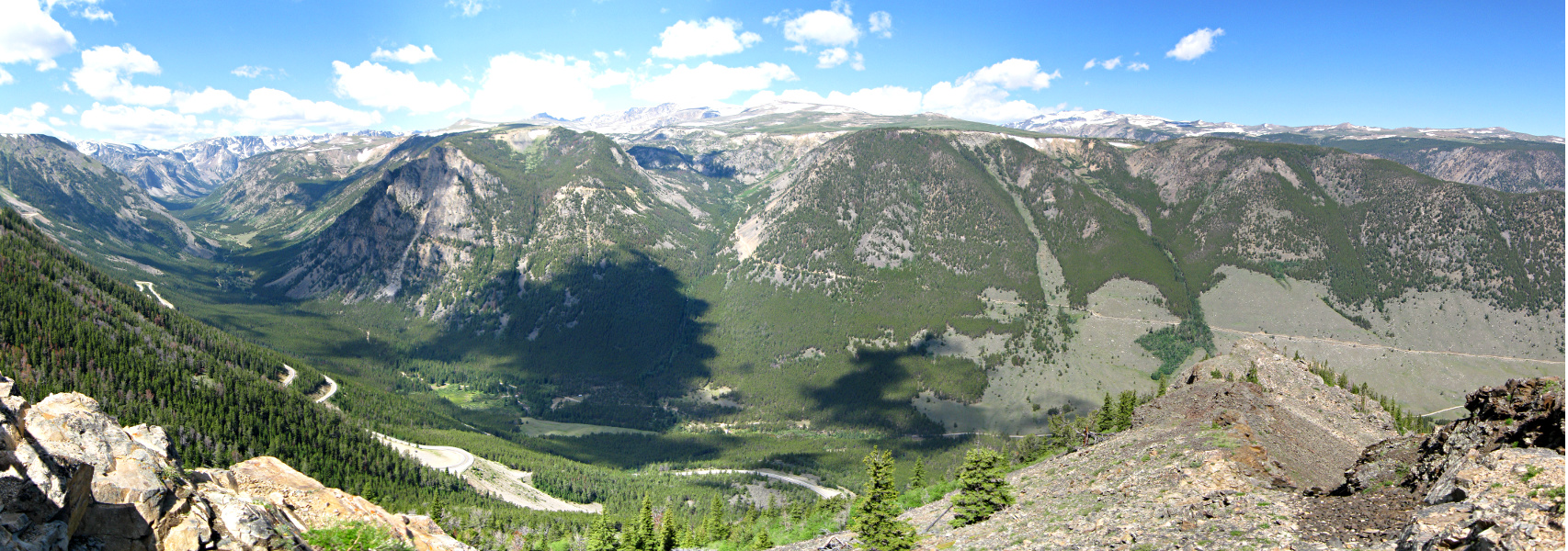
- Custer National Forest Overlook

- Location within the United States
- Location: Montana-South Dakota United States
- Nearest city: Bozeman, MT
- Coordinates: 45°12′N 108°21′W
- Area: 1,188,130 acres (4,808.2 km^{2})
- Established: July 1, 1908
- Governing body: U.S. Forest Service
- Website: Custer Gallatin National Forest

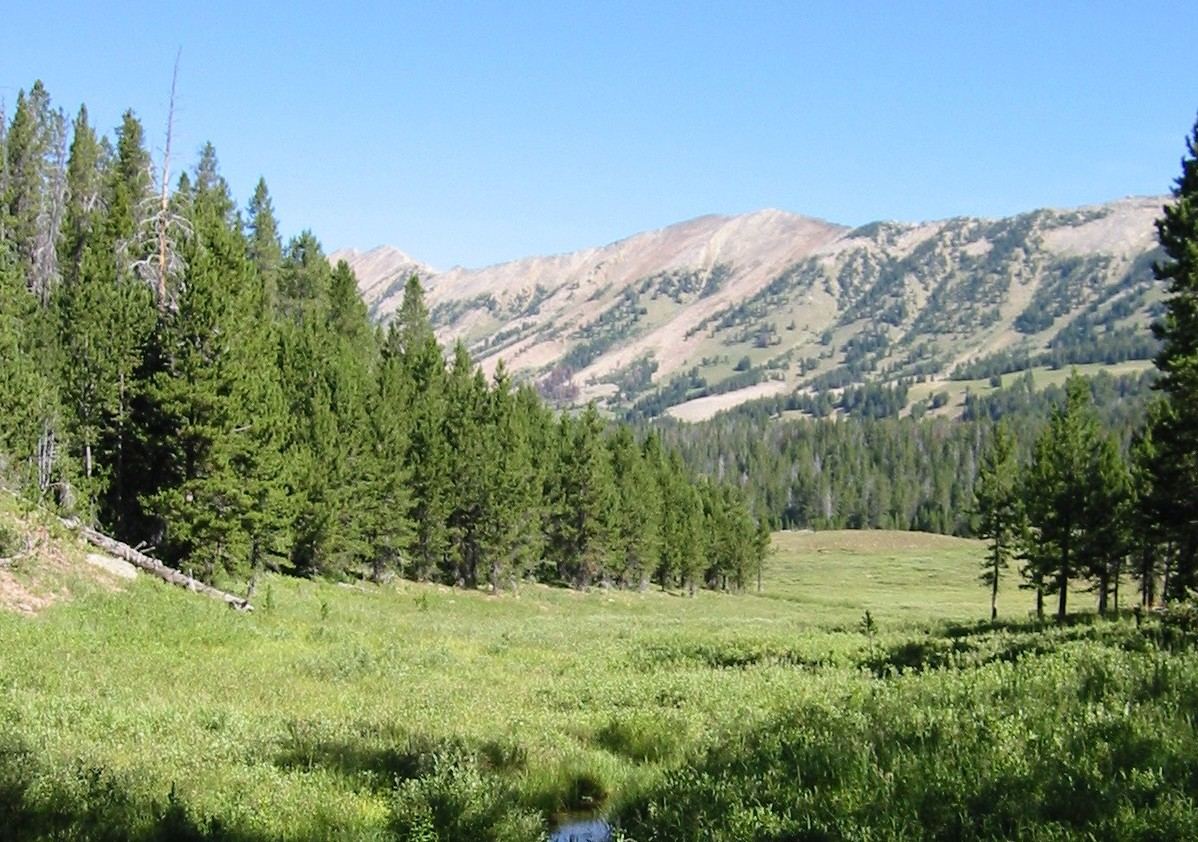
Gallatin National Forest

The Custer Gallatin National Forest is located primarily in the south central part of the U.S. state of Montana. It was formed from a merge of the Custer National Forest, located primarily in the south central part of Montana but also with separate sections in northwestern South Dakota, and the Gallatin National Forest, located in South-West Montana, with some of it in North-West Wyoming.

The Custer National Forest has a total area of 1,188,130 acres (4,808 km^{2}), the forest comprises over 10 separate sections. While in the westernmost sections, Custer National Forest is a part of the Greater Yellowstone Ecosystem, the easternmost sections are a combination of forest "islands" and grasslands. A portion of the forest is also part of the Absaroka-Beartooth Wilderness and constitutes over a third of the wilderness land. South of Red Lodge, Montana, the Beartooth Highway (U.S. 212) passes through the forest en route to Yellowstone National Park. The eastern areas are dominated by large stands of ponderosa pine surrounded by grasslands, which are often leased to local ranchers for cattle grazing.

The Gallatin National Forest has an area of 2,129,194 acres, and was established February 10, 1899

== Administration ==
Since 2014, the Custer and Gallatin National Forests are managed together as the Custer Gallatin National Forest with headquarters in Bozeman, Montana. There is an additional office in Billings. There are local ranger district offices located in Ashland and Red Lodge in Montana, and in Camp Crook in South Dakota for Custer, and West Yellowstone, Livingston, Gardiner, and Bozeman in Montana for Gallatin.

== Access ==
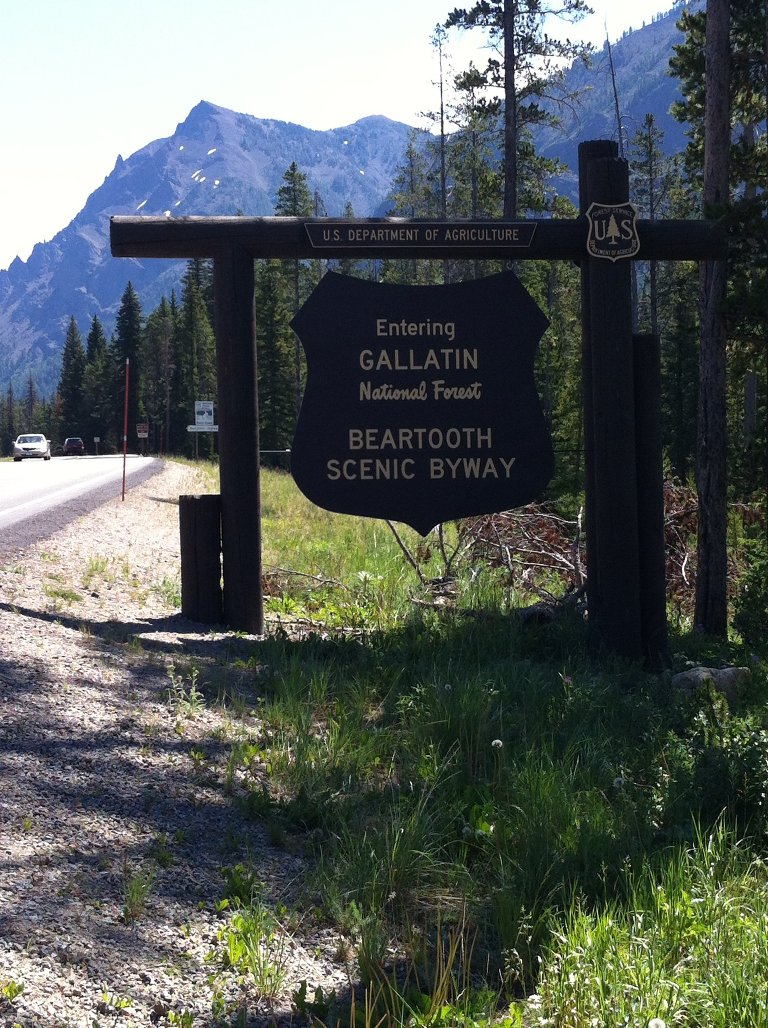
Sign marking the entry to Gallatin National Forest along Beartooth Highway (U.S. Route 212), July 2002

There's access to the forest off Interstate 90 South on U.S. Highway 89 from Livingston, Montana, to Gardiner, Montana, or South on U.S. 191 from Bozeman, Montana, to West Yellowstone.

Over 2,290 mi (3,690 km) of hiking trails are located in the forest providing access to wilderness areas and interlinking with trails in Yellowstone National Park. There are almost 40 vehicle accessible campgrounds scattered throughout the forest, numerous picnic areas, and even cabins that can be rented for a nominal fee through the forest's district offices. West Yellowstone, Montana provides access both into the forest and to Yellowstone National Park and is a popular snowmobile center during the winter. Nighttime temperatures can be below freezing any time of the year, and mosquitoes in the late spring and early summer are abundant. Summertime high temperatures average in the 70s Fahrenheit (21–26 °C), and the wintertime lows can drop below −40 degrees. Most of the precipitation falls in the form of snow with some places averaging over 33 ft (10 m) annually.

== Overview ==
The western sections have a mixture of pine, spruce and fir trees due to the increased altitude and more abundant rainfall. Higher altitudes deep into the wilderness areas are above timberline and alpine conditions prevail. The tallest mountain in Montana, Granite Peak, is shared with Gallatin National Forest, as is the interesting Grasshopper Glacier, which has millions of grasshoppers that died approximately 300 years ago, entombed within the ice.

Within the forest are Native American burial grounds, pictographs and petroglyphs. For the plains Indians, the forest provided shelter and a stable food supply. Members of the Lewis and Clark Expedition are generally considered to be the first white Americans to visit the region. The forest is currently divided into three Ranger Districts: Beartooth in Red Lodge, Montana; Ashland in Ashland, Montana; and Sioux in Camp Crook, South Dakota. Four National Grasslands were formerly managed by the forest as the Grand River, Cedar River, Little Missouri and Sheyenne National Grasslands. These units are now managed as the Dakota Prairie Grasslands, headquartered in Bismarck, ND.

There are over 30 vehicle accessible campgrounds in the forest, as well as numerous picnic areas. Over 1,500 miles (2,400 km) of hiking trails are available with most being found in the western district. Though not plentiful with rivers and lakes, the waterways do provide some opportunities for fishing but little for boating. The forest headquarters is located in Billings, Montana, and most hiking and camping is done in the region south and southwest of Billings. There are local ranger district offices in Ashland and Red Lodge in Montana, and in Camp Crook in South Dakota.

In descending order of land area the forest is located in parts of Powder River, Carbon, Stillwater, Rosebud, Carter, Sweet Grass, Harding (the only county in South Dakota), and Park counties. Only about 6.2% of the acreage lies in South Dakota.

== Geography ==
The forest area comprises a total of 3,411,239 acres (13,804.79 km^{2}) with around 2,129,194 acres (8,616.54 km^{2}) located in the Gallatin Forest area and 1,282,045 acres (5,188.25 km^{2}) within the Custer. Most of the Gallatin borders Yellowstone National Park and is a part of the Greater Yellowstone Ecosystem, an area which encompasses almost 20,000,000 acres (81,000 km^{2}) in and around the park. The Custer National Forest is spread out along Eastern Montana and the North-West side of Wyoming, with most of its land being held in Montana. The forest stretches through about six counties, including Park, Gallatin, Sweet Grass, Madison, Carbon, and Meagher.

There are six separate mountain ranges within the forest including the Gallatin, Madison, Bridger, Crazy, Absaroka, and Beartooth Ranges. The Beartooth's are home to Granite Peak, which at 12,799 ft (3,901 m), is the highest point both in the forest and in Montana. A separate section of the forest north of Livingston, Montana, is located in the Crazy Mountains which rise over 7,000 ft (2,100 m) above the Great Plains to the east. The forest includes two wilderness areas, the Absaroka–Beartooth and the Lee Metcalf, along with some of the tributaries for the Yellowstone, Madison, and Missouri rivers.

=== Wilderness Areas ===
- Absaroka–Beartooth Wilderness (943,626 acres (3,818.72 km^{2}))
- Lee Metcalf Wilderness (254,288 acres (1,029.07 km^{2})).

== Wildlife and vegetation ==
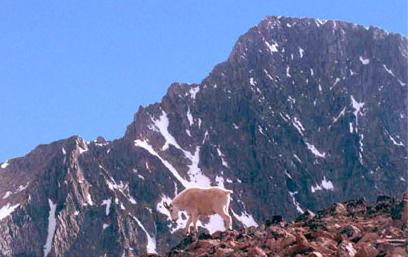
Male mountain goat crossing a rocky moraine in front of Granite Peak.

A relatively rare type of small falcon known as the merlin is found here in greater concentrations than anywhere else in the United States. Mammalian species of coyote, bighorn sheep, marmot, mule deer, wolf packs, grizzly bear, moose, bobcat, pronghorn, cougar, mountain goat, black bear, elk, and bison.

While the lower elevations are often covered in grasses and sagebrush, higher altitudes support Douglas fir, with several species of spruce, cottonwood and aspen being the dominant tree species. Of the 4,000 mi (6,400 km) of streams and rivers there are major tributaries of the Yellowstone River, which bisects the western and eastern sections of the forest running through Paradise Valley. Major tributaries of the Missouri River, the Gallatin and Madison Rivers, also are found in the forest. The habitat supports over 300 wildlife species, including grizzly bear, bald eagle, and peregrine falcon. Many western North American species are represented in this climax ecosystem including elk, mule deer, bison, moose, bighorn sheep, pronghorn, cougar, gray wolf and black bear.

Many species of fish inhabit the numerous rivers and other bodies of water, including white sucker, longnose sucker, mountain sucker, longnose dace, western mosquitofish, mottled sculpin, and gamefish such as Yellowstone cutthroat trout, mountain whitefish, and the introduced rainbow trout, brown trout, and brook trout. Various subspecies of trout are plentiful in the streams and they contribute to the forest being one of the preeminent fly fishing regions in the United States. The population of Yellowstone cutthroat trout in and near Gallatin National Forest have been at risk of hybridization with rainbow trout.

== History ==
Gallatin National forest was founded in 1899 as a part of the Northern U.S. Forest Service, eventually being named after Albert Gallatin (1761–1849), a U.S. Secretary of the Treasury and a scholar of American Indian languages and cultures. The forest is a cross roads and homelands of a number of Indian tribes, and subject to the treaties, cultural traditions and practices of various other tribes.

Custer National Forest was established by the U.S. Forest Service as Otter National Forest on March 2, 1907. On July 1, 1908, the name was changed to Custer. On January 13, 1920, the entire Sioux National Forest was added, which now comprises the Sioux Ranger District of Custer, extending into South Dakota. Sioux had previously absorbed Cave Hills, Ekalaka, Long Pine, Short Pine and Slim Buttes National Forests on July 1, 1908. On February 17, 1932, Custer absorbed a portion of Beartooth National Forest, which now comprises the Beartooth District.

In 1959, a 7.2-magnitude earthquake occurred in Madison Canyon outside of Yellowstone National Park, resulting in a massive landslide that blocked the Madison River and formed what we know as Quake Lake.

In 2014, the Gallatin National Forest and Custer National Forest were merged administratively in order to combat rising costs. A new management plan was created for both national forests in 2020.

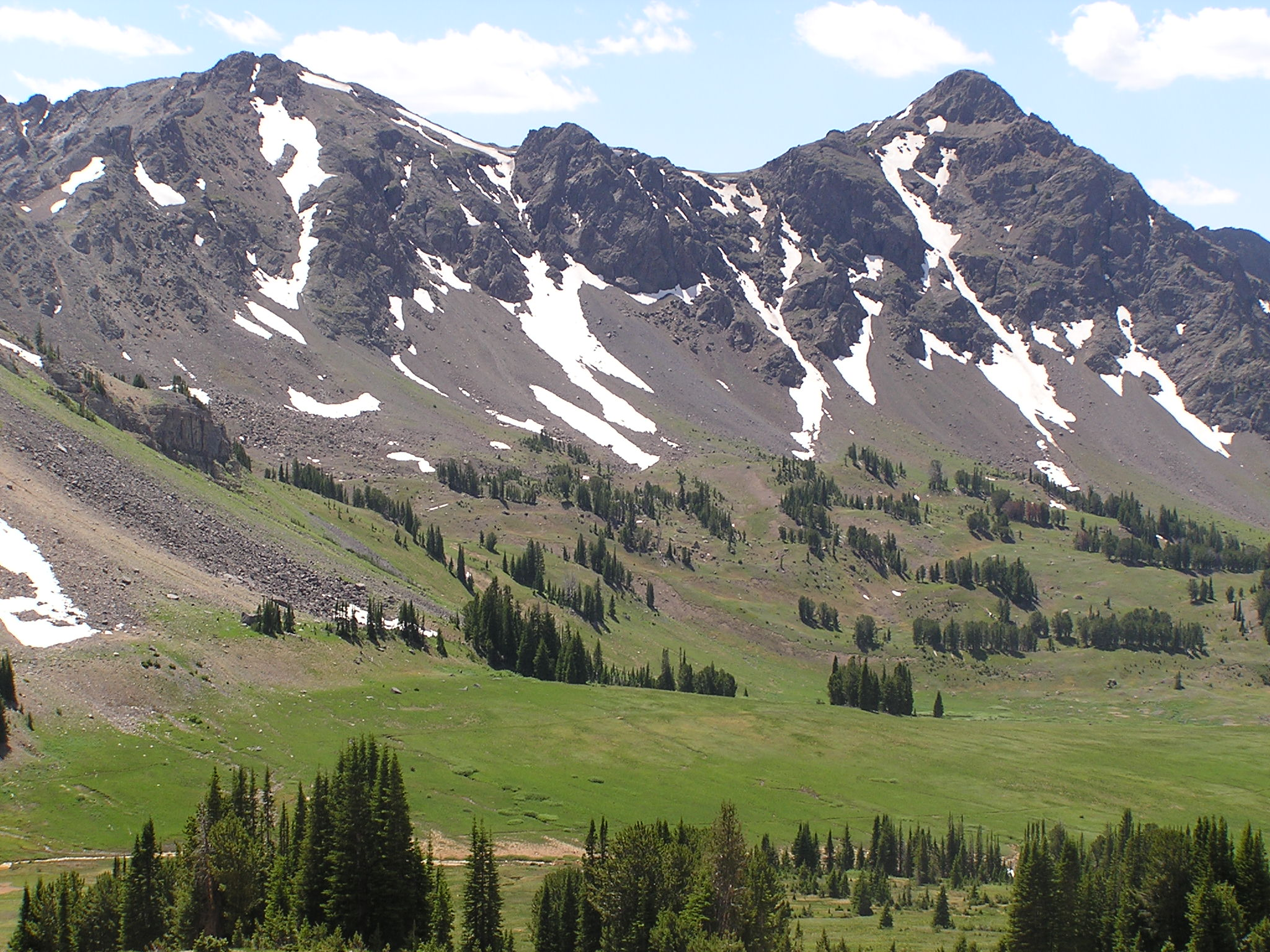
Daisy Pass near Cooke City, Montana

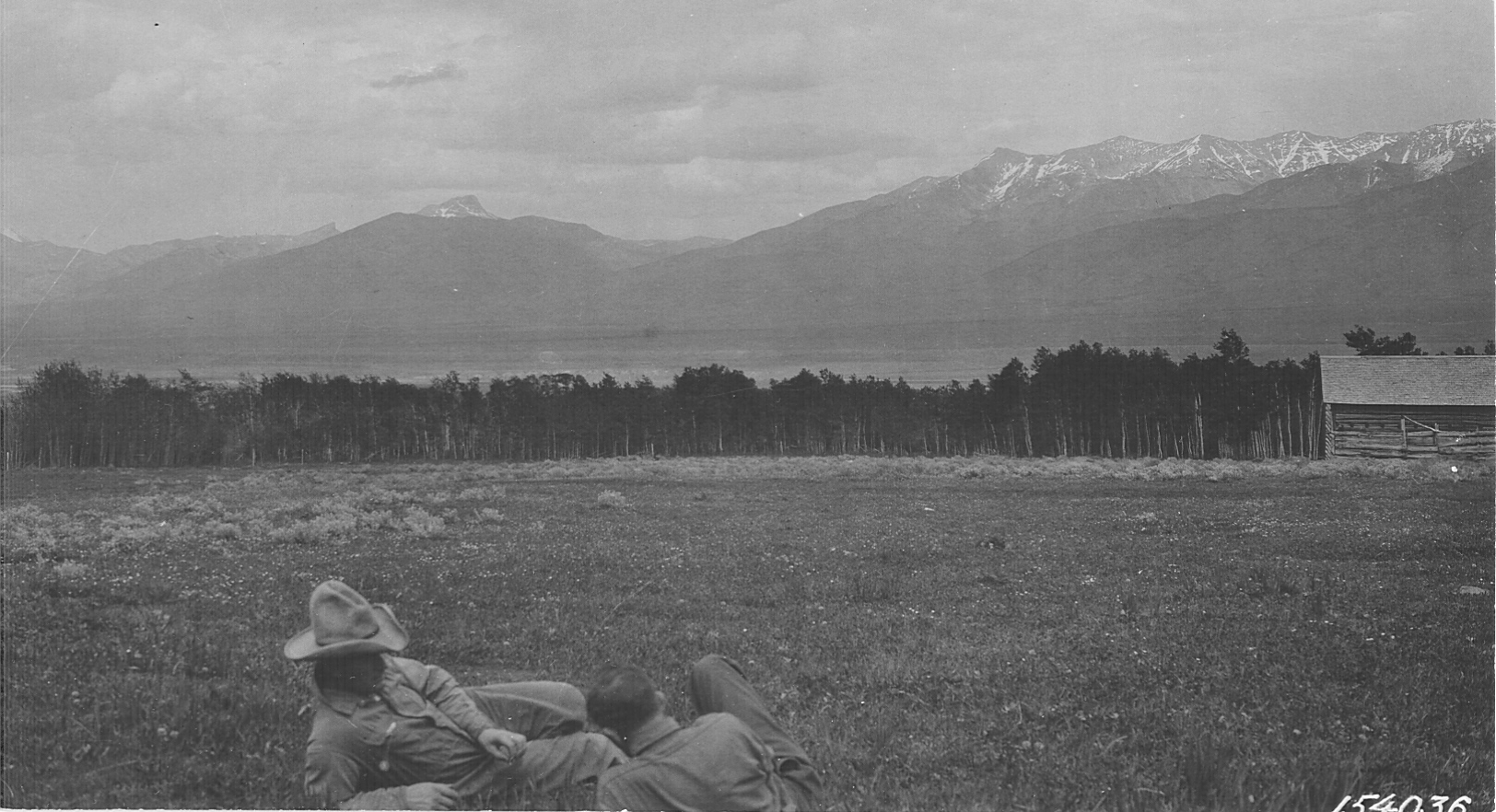
A view of Gallatin National Forest in 1921

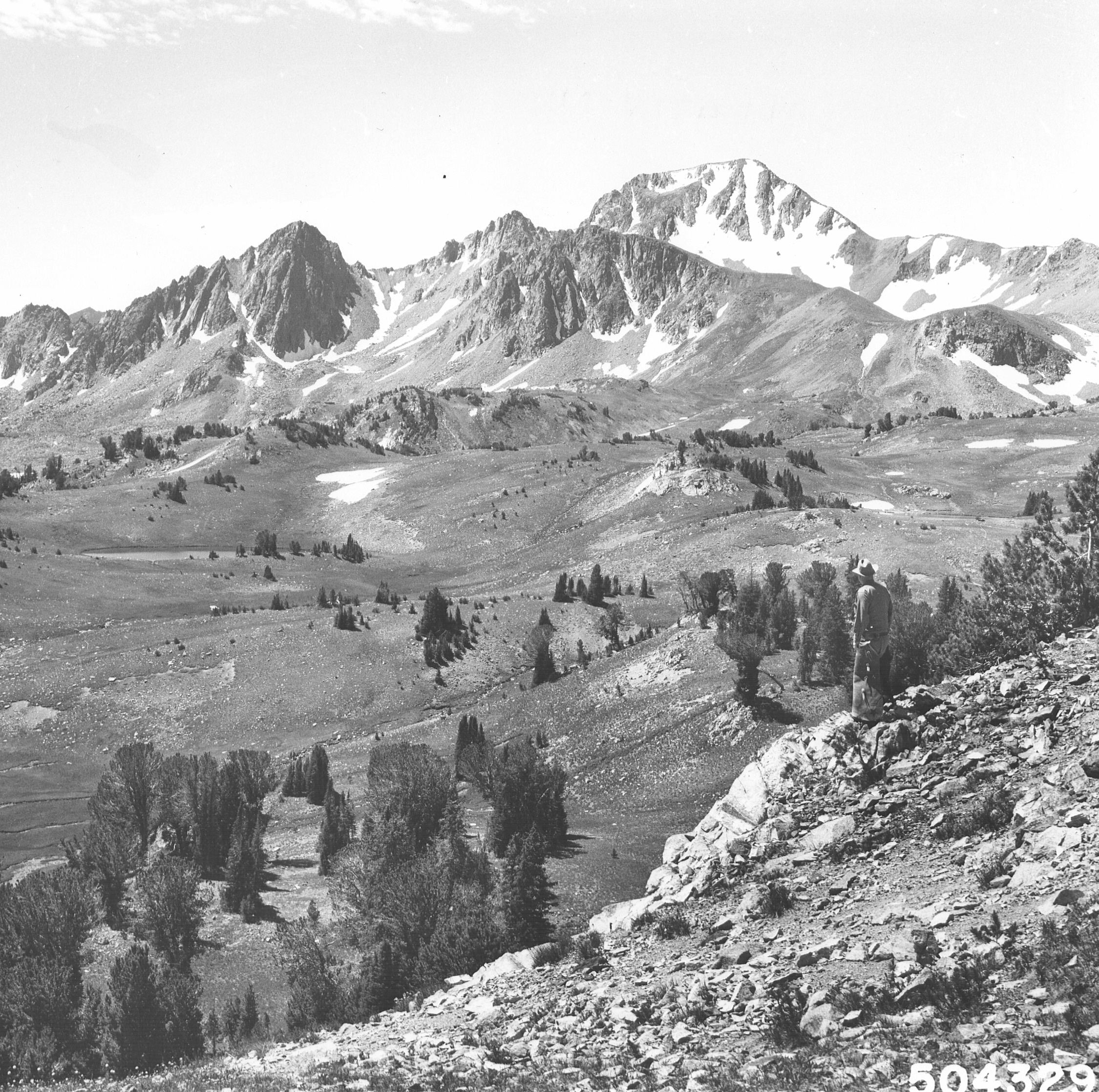
A photograph taken of the Forest in 1962

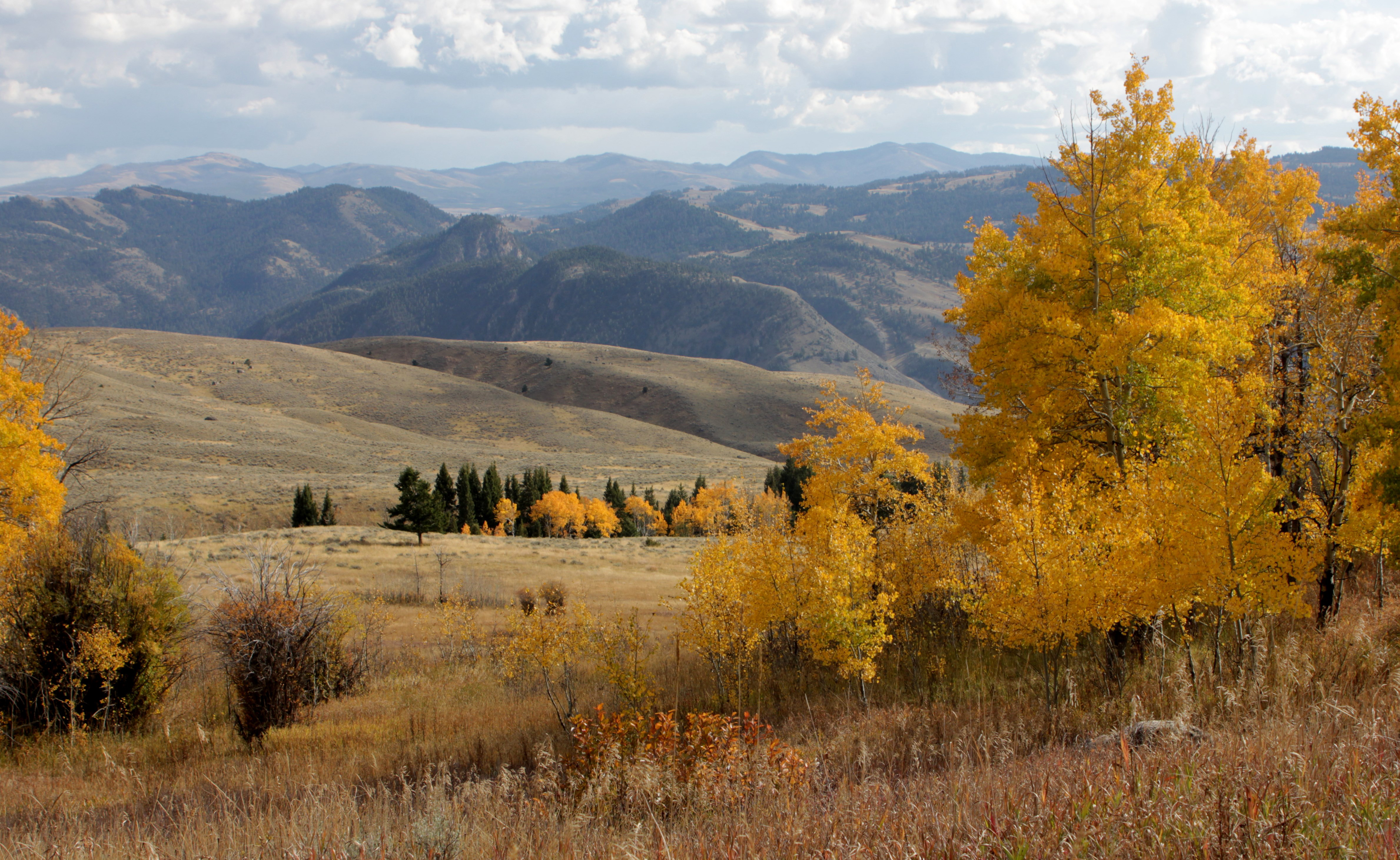
Yellowstone National Park, seen from Gallatin

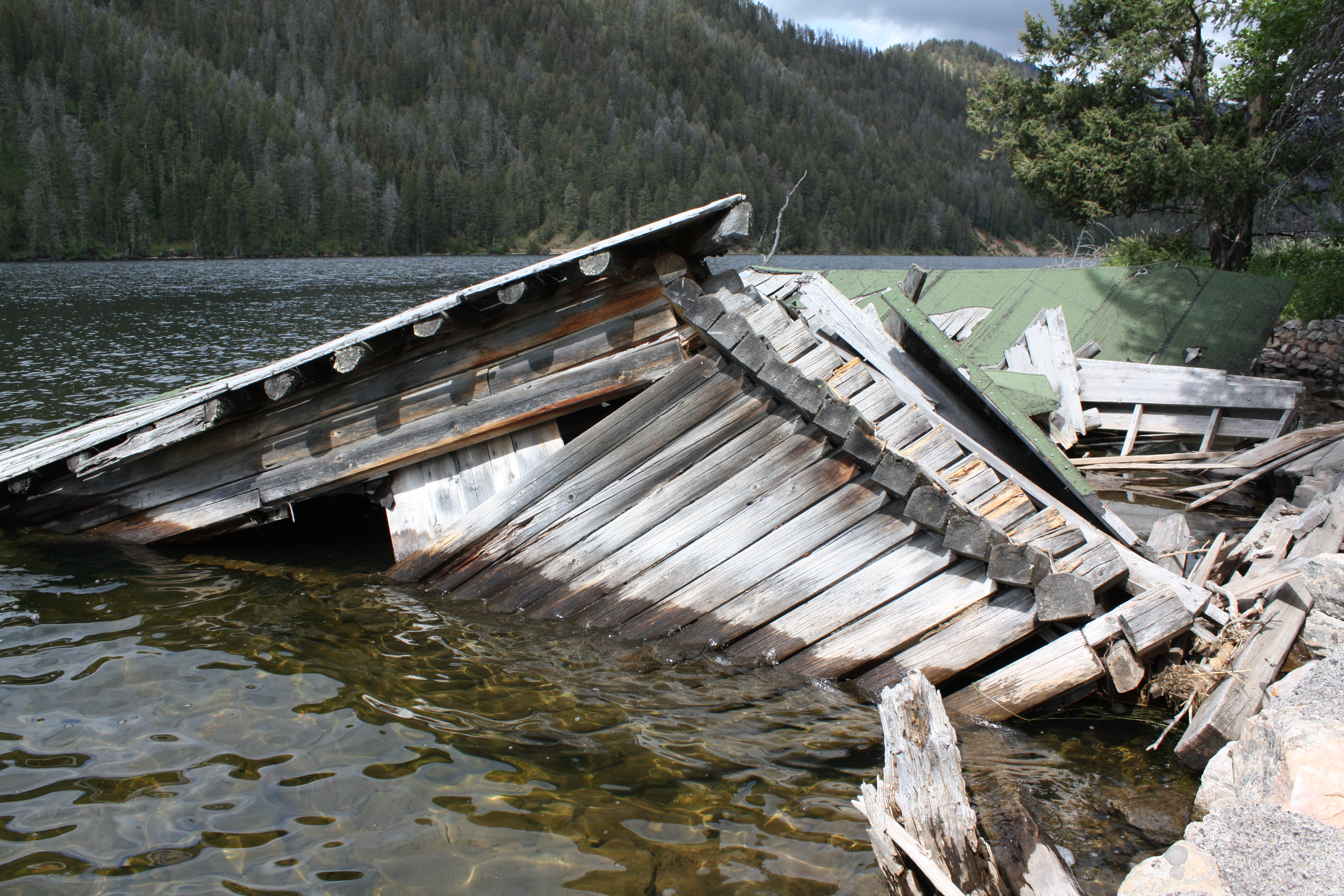
The remains of a building damaged by the 1959 Yellowstone earthquake

== See also ==
- Initial Rock
- List of national forests of the United States
- List of forests in Montana
