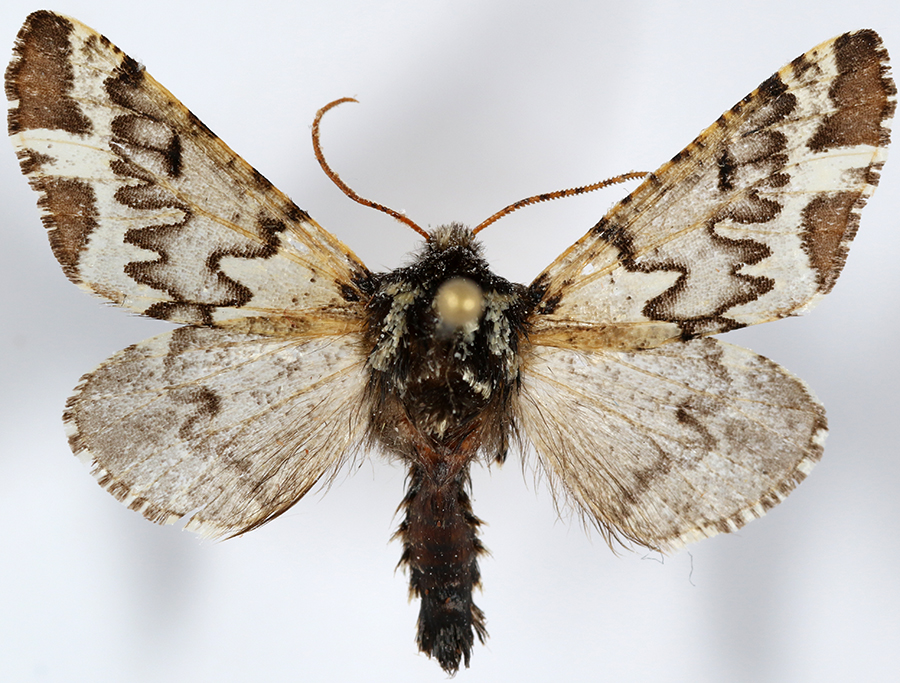

Scientific classification
- Domain: Eukaryota
- Kingdom: Animalia
- Phylum: Arthropoda
- Class: Insecta
- Order: Lepidoptera
- Family: Geometridae
- Tribe: Nacophorini
- Genus: Chiricahua
- Species: C. multidentata

Binomial name
- Chiricahua multidentata (Guedet, 1941)

= Chiricahua multidentata =

Species of moth

Chiricahua multidentata is a species of geometrid moth in the family Geometridae. It is found in Central America and North America.
