= Sioux National Forest =

Former national forest in Montana, United States

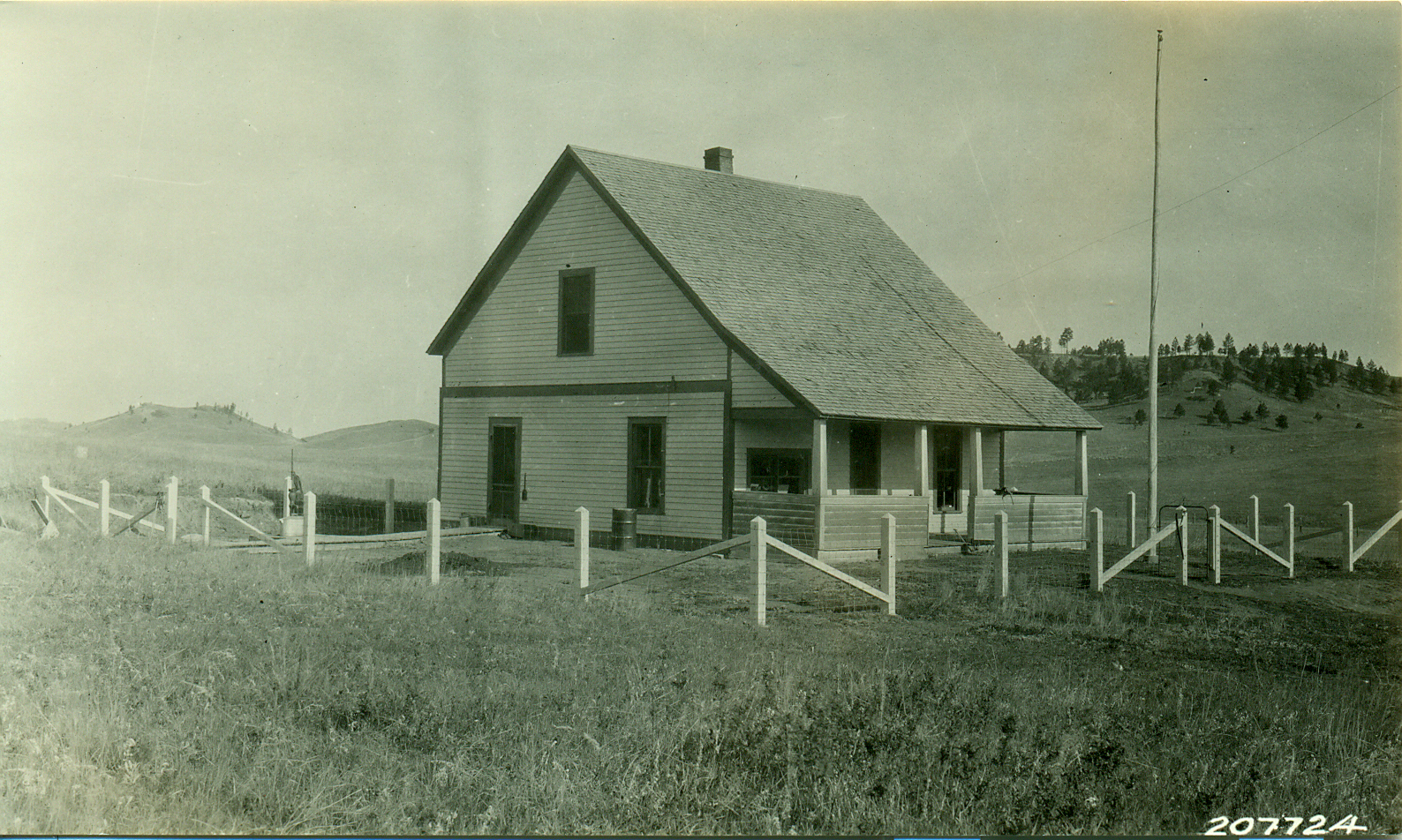
Need More Ranger Station in Sioux National Forest

Sioux National Forest was a United States National Forest (NF) established by Executive Order 908 (President Theodore Roosevelt) on July 1, 1908. The order called for the consolidation of the following national forests and forest units into a single entity:

- Ekalaka National Forest, Carter County, Montana 45°49′30″N 104°27′35″W, 33,808 acres (136.82 km^{2})
- Long Pine National Forest, Carter County, Montana 45°41′20″N 104°13′42″W, 111,445 acres (451.00 km^{2})
- Cave Hills National Forest, Harding County, South Dakota, 23,360 acres (94.5 km^{2})
  - North Cave Hills, Harding County, South Dakota 45°49′57″N 103°28′15″W
  - South Cave Hills, Harding County, South Dakota 44°44′35″N 103°32′28″W
- Short Pine National Forest, Harding County, South Dakota, (19,040 acres (77.1 km^{2})
  - East Short Pine Hills, Harding County, South Dakota 45°22′23″N 103°41′54″W
  - West Short Pine Hills, Harding County, South Dakota 45°23′01″N 103°53′25″W
- Slim Buttes National Forest, Harding County, South Dakota 45°29′21″N 103°11′25″W, 58,160 acres (235.4 km^{2})

In addition to these national forests and forest units, a parcel of land completely surrounding the Chalk Buttes mountain range in Carter County, Montana, was also included:

- Chalk Buttes, Carter County, Montana 45°44′03″N 104°41′11″W, 3,840 acres (15.5 km^{2})

With these eight land units, the Sioux National Forest comprised 249,653 acres (1,010.31 km^{2}). (Note: All values for acreage (km2) given on this page reflect the size of the various land units at the time of consolidation, July 1, 1908.)

Upon its inception in 1908, Seth Bullock, the first sheriff of Deadwood, South Dakota, was appointed supervisor of Sioux NF by President Theodore Roosevelt. (In 1900, during the McKinley administration, then-Vice President Roosevelt had appointed Bullock supervisor of the Black Hills Forest Reserve, which later became Black Hills National Forest.)

On January 13, 1920, Sioux NF was absorbed by Custer National Forest. Although the name Sioux was discontinued as a national forest designation, Custer NF created the Sioux District, which comprised the eight land units of the Sioux NF.

In 2014, Custer National Forest merged with Gallatin National Forest to form Custer Gallatin National Forest. Within this new entity, Custer NF's Sioux District was replaced by the Custer Gallatin NF Sioux Ranger District, which encompasses the Chalk Buttes, Ekalaka Hills, Long Pines, North Cave Hills, South Cave Hills, East Short Pine Hills, West Short Pine Hills, and Slim Buttes land units.

== See also ==
- List of forests in Montana
