= Baboquivari National Forest =

Formerly named National Forest in Arizona

Coordinates: 31°28′N 110°23′W

Baboquivari National Forest was established as the Baboquivari Forest Reserve by the U.S. Forest Service in Arizona on November 5, 1906, with 126,720 acres (512.8 km^{2}). On March 4, 1907, it became a National Forest, and on July 1, 1908, the entire forest was combined with Huachuca National Forest and Tumacacori National Forest to establish Garces National Forest. The name was discontinued.

The forest included part of the Huachuca Mountains, one of the Madrean Sky Islands. The lands are presently part of the Sierra Vista District of Coronado National Forest.

== See also ==
- Baboquivari Peak Wilderness
