= Pine Plains National Forest =

Former national forest in New York

Pine Plains National Forest was established in New York by the U.S. Forest Service on April 10, 1925 with 9,800 acres (40 km^{2}) from part of the Pine Plains Military Reservation. On December 2, 1927, the executive order for its creation was rescinded and the forest was abolished. The lands are presently part of Fort Drum.
