= San Jacinto National Forest =

Former national forest in California

Coordinates: 33°43′52″N 116°38′49″W

San Jacinto National Forest was established as the San Jacinto Forest Reserve by the United States General Land Office in California on February 22, 1897 with 740,000 acres (3,000 km^{2}). After the transfer of federal forests to the U.S. Forest Service in 1905, it became a National Forest on March 4, 1907. On July 1, 1908 the entire forest was combined with Trabuco Canyon National Forest to establish Cleveland National Forest, and the name was discontinued.
