= Zuni National Forest =

Former National Forest designation

Zuni National Forest was established by the U.S. Forest Service in Arizona and New Mexico on March 2, 1909 with 670,981 acres (2,715.36 km^{2}) from parts of the Zuni and Navajo and other tribal lands. On September 10, 1914 Zuni was transferred to Manzano National Forest. The lands are now part of the Cibola National Forest.

The Zuni Forest is part of the Mount Taylor Ranger District of Cibola National Forest, in the Zuni Mountains to the west of Grants in Cibola and McKinley Counties. The forest is bordered on the south by El Malpais National Monument.
