= Blue Mountains National Forest =

Former national forest in Oregon

Coordinates: 44.9550°N 119.6132°W

Blue Mountains National Forest was established as the Blue Mountains Forest Reserve by the U.S. Forest Service in Oregon on March 15, 1906, with 2,675,620 acres (10,827.8 km^{2}) from portions of the Baker City Forest Reserve and other lands. It became a National Forest on March 4, 1907. On March 2, 1908 Maury Mountain Forest Reserve was added to Blue Mountains, and on July 1, 1911, the forest was divided among Whitman, Malheur, Umatilla and Deschutes National Forests and the name was discontinued.
