= Magdalena National Forest =

Forest in New Mexico, U.S.

Magdalena National Forest was established as the Magdalena Forest Reserve by the U.S. Forest Service in New Mexico on November 5, 1906, with 153,781 acres (622.33 km^{2}). It became a National Forest on March 4, 1907. On July 1, 1908, San Mateo National Forest was added. On February 23, 1909, the forest was combined with Datil National Forest

The Magdalena Forest is now part of the Magdalena Ranger District of Cibola National Forest, in the Magdalena Mountains to the south of Magdalena in Socorro County.
