= Trabuco Canyon National Forest =

National forest in California, U.S.

Coordinates: 33°41′03″N 117°31′52″W

Trabuco Canyon National Forest was established by the U.S. Forest Service in California on July 6, 1907 with 153,387 acres (620.74 km^{2}) when the name was changed from Trabuco Cañon Forest Reserve and land was added. On July 1, 1908 the forest was combined with San Jacinto National Forest to create Cleveland National Forest and the name was discontinued.
