= Durango National Forest =

Former national forest in Colorado

Durango National Forest was established in Colorado on July 1, 1911, from a portion of San Juan National Forest with 704,000 acres (2,850 km^{2}). On November 21, 1920, it was re-combined with San Juan and the name was discontinued.
