= Mount Taylor National Forest =

Forest in New Mexico, U.S.

Coordinates: 35.236°N 107.624°W

Mount Taylor National Forest was established as the Mount Taylor Forest Reserve by the U.S. Forest Service in New Mexico on October 5, 1906 with 110,525 acres (447.28 km^{2}). It became a National Forest on March 4, 1907. On April 16, 1908 Mount Taylor was combined with Manzano National Forest.

The Mount Taylor Forest is part of the Mount Taylor Ranger District of Cibola National Forest, in the San Mateo Mountains to the northeast of Grants.
