= Dragoon National Forest =

Re-named section of the Coronado National Forest

Coordinates: 31°49′48″N 109°18′07″W

Dragoon National Forest was established in Arizona on May 25, 1907, covering 69,120 acres (280 km^{2}). On July 1, 1908, it was combined with Santa Catalina National Forest and Santa Rita National Forest to create Coronado National Forest. The name was discontinued.

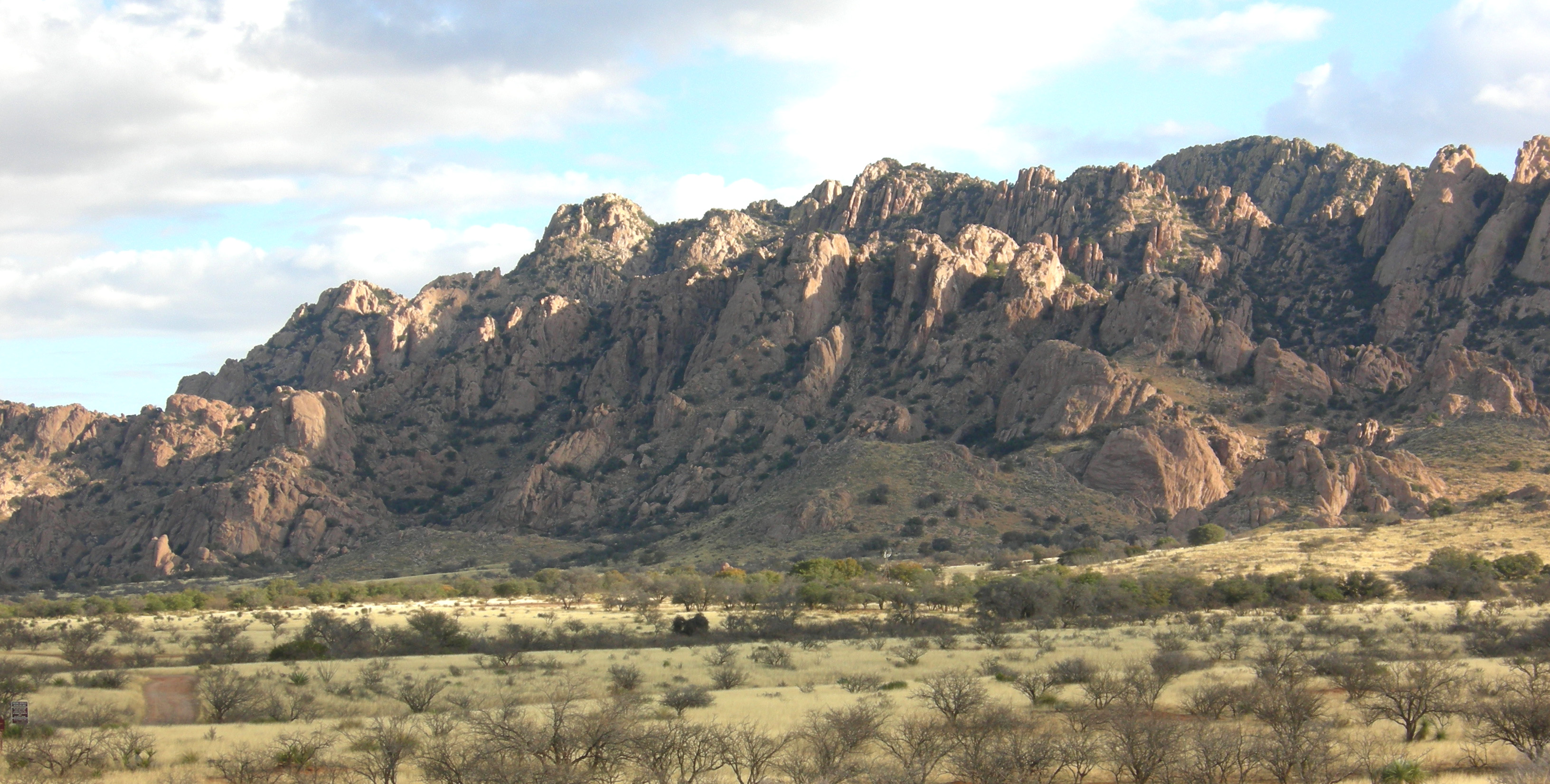
Dragoon Mountains, Arizona, viewed from the south.

The forest included the Dragoon and Little Dragoon Mountains, two of the Madrean Sky Islands. The area is included in the Douglas Ranger District of Coronado National Forest.
