= Wet Mountains National Forest =

Forest in Colorado, United States

Wet Mountains National Forest was established as the Wet Mountains Forest Reserve by the U.S. Forest Service in Colorado on June 12, 1905 with 239,621 acres (969.71 km^{2}). It became a National Forest on March 4, 1907. On July 1, 1908 the forest was combined with San Isabel National Forest and the name was discontinued.
