= Huachuca National Forest =

Former name for a protected area in Arizona

Coordinates: 31.51°N 110.56°W

Huachuca National Forest was established as the Huachuca Forest Reserve by the U.S. Forest Service in Arizona on November 6, 1906 with 314,125 acres. It became a National Forest on March 4, 1907. On July 1, 1908 the entire forest was combined with Baboquivari National Forest and Tumacacori National Forest to establish Garces National Forest, and the name was discontinued. The lands are presently included in Coronado National Forest.
