= Dakota National Forest =

Former national forest in North Dakota

Coordinates: 46°35′05.0″N 103°28′52.4″W

The Dakota National Forest was a national forest established in North Dakota by the U.S. Forest Service on November 24, 1908 with 13,940 acres (56.4 km^{2}) near Ranger as an experimental forest. On July 30, 1917 it was abolished.
