= Santa Catalina National Forest =

Former name for two National Forests in Arizona

Coordinates: 32°26′N 110°42′W

Santa Catalina National Forest was established as the Santa Catalina Forest Reserve by the United States General Land Office in Arizona on July 2, 1902 with 155,520 acres (629.4 km^{2}). After the transfer of federal forests to the U.S. Forest Service in 1905, it became a National Forest on March 4, 1907. On July 1, 1908 it was combined with Dragoon National Forest and Santa Rita National Forest to create Coronado National Forest and the name was discontinued.

The Santa Catalina Mountains are located northeast of Tucson and are part of the Santa Catalina Ranger District of Coronado National Forest.
