= Jackson National Forest =

Protected area in South Carolina, US

Jackson National Forest was established in South Carolina by the U.S. Forest Service on December 22, 1924, with 20,255 acres (81.97 km^{2}) from part of the Jackson Military Reservation. On May 17, 1928, the executive order for its creation was rescinded and the forest was abolished.
