= Moapa National Forest =

National forest in Nevada, US

Moapa National Forest is a state forest in Nevada. It was established on July 1, 1908, with 345,005 acres (1,396.19 km^{2}) from the consolidation of Charleston National Forest and Vegas National Forest. On July 1, 1915 it was absorbed by Toiyabe National Forest and the name was discontinued.
