= Yuba Forest Reserve =

Former national forest in California

The Yuba Forest Reserve was established by the U.S. Forest Service in California on November 11, 1905, with 524,287 acres (2,121.71 km^{2}). On September 17, 1906, the forest was combined with the Tahoe Forest Reserve and the name was discontinued.
