= Maury Mountain Forest Reserve =

Former national forest in Oregon

Coordinates: 44.03291°N 120.41832°W

The Maury Mountain Forest Reserve was established by the U.S. Forest Service in Oregon on June 2, 1905 with 54,220 acres (219.4 km^{2}). On March 2, 1907 the forest was combined with Blue Mountains National Forest and the name was discontinued. The lands are presently divided among several Oregon Forests.
