= Santa Rosa National Forest =

Protected area in Nevada, United States

Santa Rosa National Forest was established by the U.S. Forest Service in Nevada on April 11, 1911 with 299,960 acres (121,390 ha). On July 1, 1917 the entire forest was transferred to Humboldt National Forest and the name was discontinued.
