= Upton National Forest =

Former national forest in New York

Upton National Forest was established in New York by the U.S. Forest Service on April 10, 1925, with 6,154 acres (24.90 km^{2}) from part of the Upton Military Reservation. On June 29, 1927, the executive order for its creation was revoked and the forest was disestablished.
