= Tillamook National Forest =

Former national forest in Oregon

Coordinates: 45.23563°N 123.63331°W

Tillamook National Forest was established by the U.S. Forest Service in Oregon on March 2, 1907, with 175,518 acres (710.30 km^{2}). On July 1, 1908, Executive Order 860 assigned a portion to Umpqua National Forest to establish Siuslaw National Forest and the remainder was returned to the public domain. The name was discontinued.
