= Palisade National Forest =

Forest in the USA

Coordinates: 44°12′N 111°18′W

Palisade National Forest was established by the U.S. Forest Service in Wyoming and Idaho on July 1, 1910, with 583,650 acres (2,361.9 km^{2}), evenly divided between Wyoming and Idaho, from the southern portion of Targhee National Forest. On July 1, 1917 the entire forest was named "Targhee" and the "Palisade" name was discontinued.
