= Florida National Forest =

National forest in Florida, USA

Coordinates: 30.5646°N 86.6013°W

Florida National Forest was established by the U.S. Forest Service in Florida on July 1, 1911, with 674,970 acres (2,731.5 km^{2}) by combining Ocala National Forest and Choctawhatchee National Forest. On October 17, 1927, the Ocala Division was separated to re-form Ocala National Forest. On November 10, 1927, the forest was renamed Choctawhatchee National Forest.
