= Ruby Mountains National Forest =

Forest reserve in Nevada, US

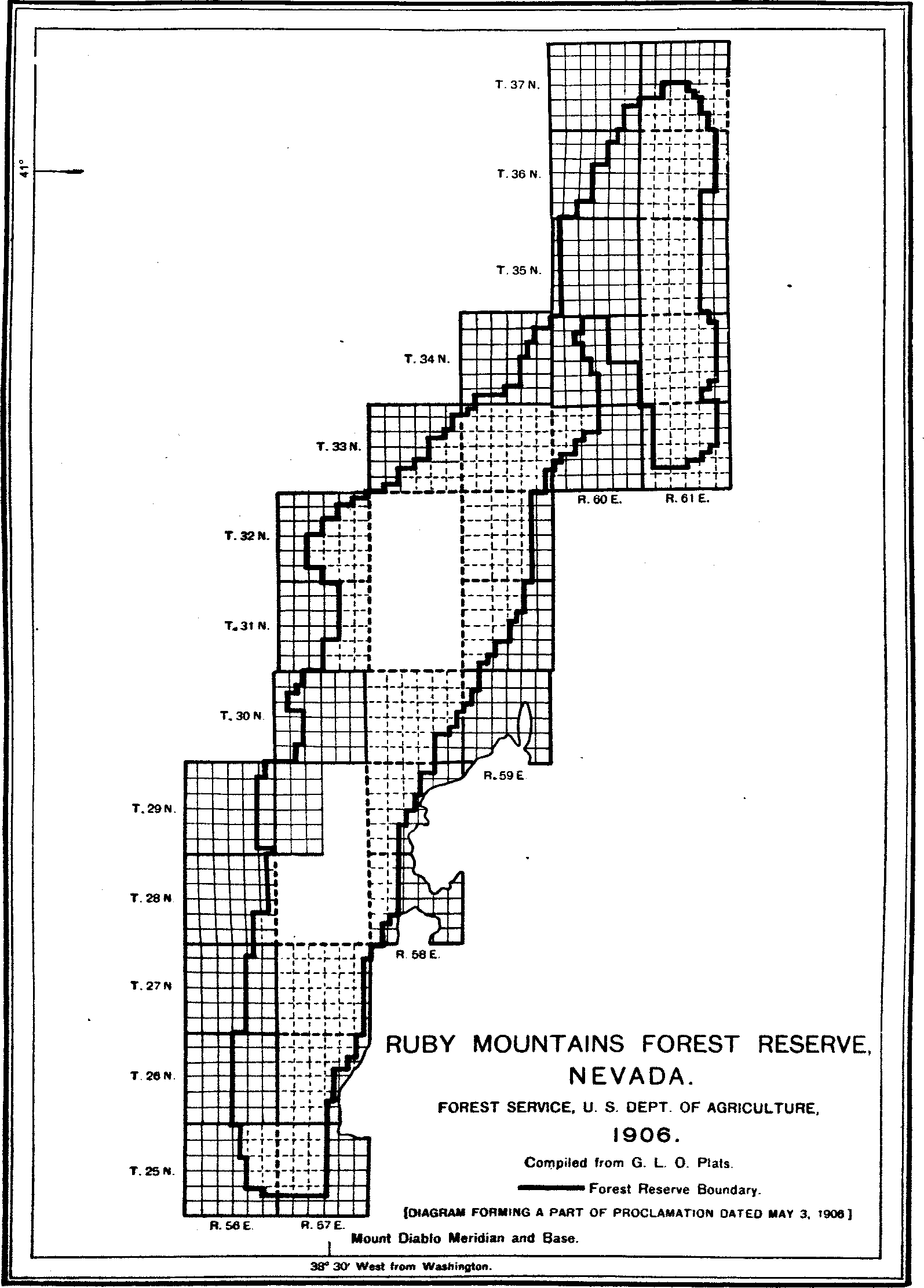
Ruby Mountains Forest Reserve map

Ruby Mountains National Forest was established as the Ruby Mountains Forest Reserve by the U.S. Forest Service in the Ruby Mountains of northeastern Nevada on May 3, 1906 with 423,660 acres (1,714.5 km^{2}). It became a National Forest on March 4, 1907. On July 1, 1908 the entire forest was added to Humboldt National Forest and the name was discontinued until Ruby National Forest was established from Humboldt in 1912. The lands are presently part of the Ruby Mountain District of Humboldt-Toiyabe National Forest.

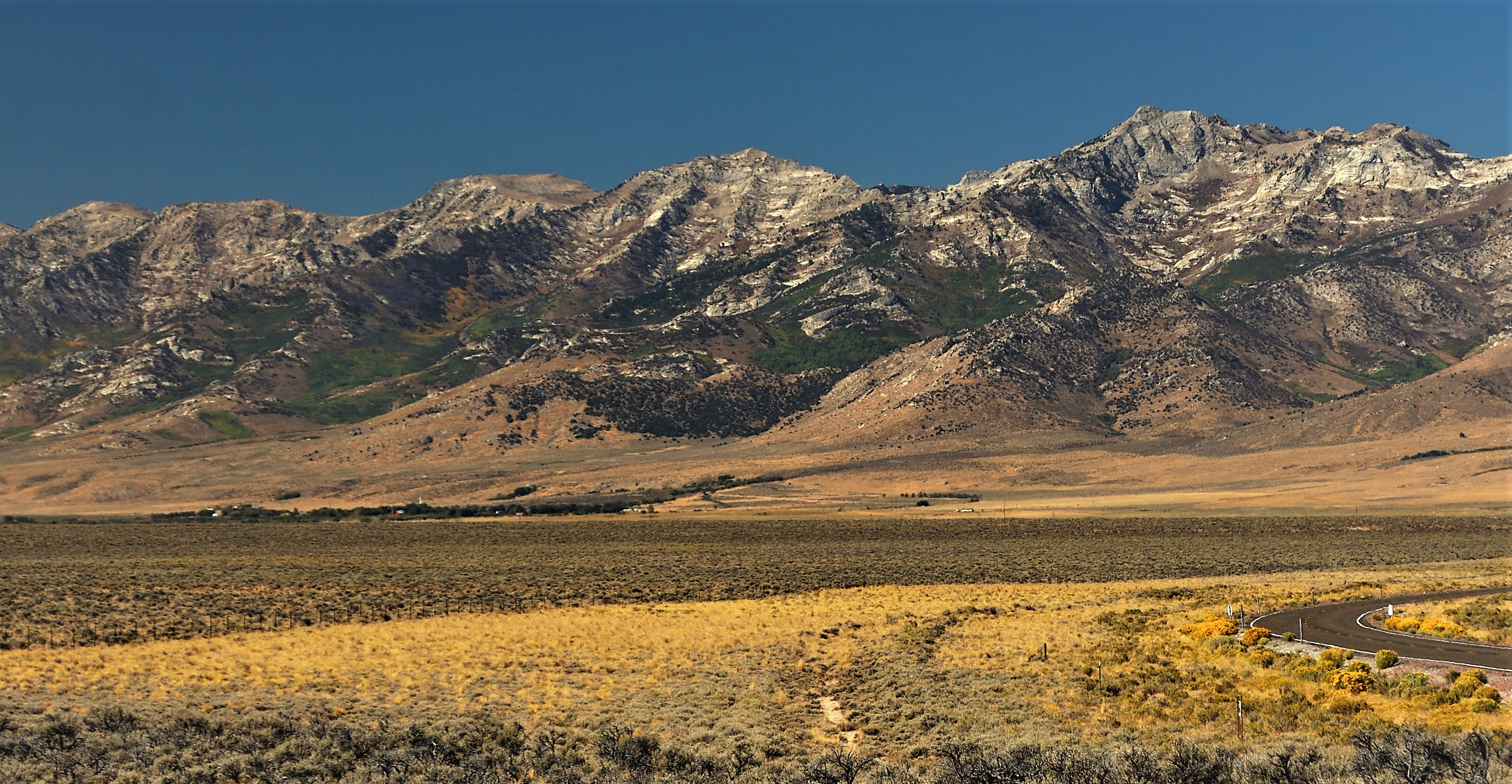
Ruby Mountains from Ruby Valley

The forest was administered from the Gold Creek Ranger Station from 1911-to 1916, which has been listed on the National Register of Historic Places.
