= Fruita National Forest =

Former national forest in Colorado

Fruita National Forest, located in Colorado, was established as the Fruita Forest Reserve by the U.S. Forest Service on February 24, 1906 with 7,680 acres (31.1 km^{2}). It became a National Forest on March 4, 1907. On July 1, 1908, Fruita National Forest was transferred to Uncompahgre National Forest and the name was discontinued. The tract was transferred to the Grand Mesa National Forest in 1924, where it is known as the Fruita Division.
