= Payson National Forest =

Former national forest in Utah

Coordinates: 39.6978°N 111.8361°W

Payson National Forest was established as the Payson Forest Reserve by the United States General Land Office in Utah on August 3, 1901, with 86,400 acres (350 km^{2}), located near Nephi. After the transfer of federal forests to the U.S. Forest Service in 1905, it became a National Forest on March 4, 1907. On July 1, 1908, Payson and Vernon National Forests and part of Fillmore were combined to create Nebo National Forest. The lands presently exist in Uinta National Forest and contain the Mt. Nebo Wilderness.

== See also ==
- Mount Nebo (Utah)
