= Ruby National Forest =

Forest in Nevada, United States

Ruby National Forest was established by the U.S. Forest Service in the Ruby Mountains of northeast Nevada on June 19, 1912 with 433,570 acres (1,754.6 km^{2}) transferred from part of Humboldt National Forest and other lands. On July 1, 1917 the entire forest was transferred back to Humboldt and the name was discontinued. The lands are presently part of the Ruby Mountains District of Humboldt–Toiyabe National Forest.

== See also ==
- Ruby Mountains National Forest
