= Trabuco Cañon National Forest =

Former national forest in California

Trabuco Cañon National Forest was established as the Trabuco Cañon Forest Reserve by the United States General Land Office in California on February 25, 1893 with 49,920 acres (202.0 km^{2}). In 1905 all federal forests were transferred to the U.S. Forest Service. On July 6, 1907 the name was changed to Trabuco Canyon National Forest and lands were added.

The reserve was the third set aside in California, after San Gabriel and Sierra reserves. It originally covered 109,920 acres (444.8 km^{2}) in the Santa Ana Mountains. Its purpose was the protection of water presources. It is now the Cleveland National Forest.
