= Pacific Forest Reserve =

Former protected area in Washington, United States

The Pacific Forest Reserve was established by the United States General Land Office in Washington on February 20, 1893 with 967,680 acres (3,916.1 km^{2}). On February 22, 1898 the forest was combined with other lands to create the Mount Rainier Forest Reserve, and the name was discontinued.
