= Natural Bridge National Forest =

Former national forest in Virginia

Natural Bridge National Forest was established by the U.S. Forest Service in Virginia on May 16, 1918, with 107,038 acres (433.17 km^{2}). On July 22, 1933, the entire forest was transferred to George Washington National Forest and the name was discontinued.
