= Chenismus Forest Reserve =

Historical forest reserve in Oregon, U.S.

Coordinates: 42.73°N 122.33°W

The Chenismus Forest Reserve was established in Oregon by the U.S. Forest Service on May 12, 1905, with 220,320 acres (891.6 km^{2}). On March 1, 1907, it was combined with the first Wallowa National Forest to create Imnaha National Forest and the name was discontinued. Its lands presently exist as a portion of Wallowa–Whitman National Forest.
