= McClellan National Forest =

Former national forest in Alabama

Coordinates: 33°42′26″N 85°44′45″W

McClellan National Forest was established in Alabama by the U.S. Forest Service on December 22, 1924 with 15,350 acres (62.1 km^{2}) from part of the Camp McClellan Military Reservation. On May 4, 1928 the executive order for its creation was rescinded and the forest was abolished.
