= Chalk Buttes (Montana) =

Small mountain range in Carter County, Montana

- Location within Montana

Highest point
- Elevation: 4,134 ft (1,260 m)
- Coordinates: 45°44′02″N 104°41′11″W

Geography
- Country: United States
- State: Montana

The Chalk Buttes, el. 4,134 feet (1,260 m), is a small mountain range northeast of Powderville, Montana in Carter County, Montana.

== See also ==
- List of mountain ranges in Montana
- Island Range
- Sky Island
