= Battlement National Forest =

Former national forest in Colorado

Coordinates: 39°22′23″N 107°53′47″W

Battlement National Forest was established by the U.S. Forest Service in Colorado on July 1, 1908, from part of the Battlement Mesa Forest Reserve with 753,720 acres (3,050.2 km^{2}). March 11, 1924 it was renamed Grand Mesa National Forest, and the original name was discontinued.
