= Santa Rita National Forest =

Former name of two National Forests in Arizona

Coordinates: 31°49′N 110°46′W

Santa Rita National Forest was established as the Santa Rita Forest Reserve by the United States General Land Office in Arizona on April 11, 1902 with 337,300 acres (1,365 km^{2}). After the transfer of federal forests to the U.S. Forest Service in 1905, it became a National Forest on March 4, 1907. On July 1, 1908 it was combined with Santa Catalina National Forest and Dragoon National Forest to create Coronado National Forest and the name was discontinued.

The forest included the Santa Rita Mountains in Pima County and Santa Cruz County, and is part of the Nogales Ranger District of Coronado.
