= Savanna National Forest =

Former national forest of Illinois, United States

Coordinates: 42°14′13″N 90°22′38″W

Savanna National Forest was established by the U.S. Forest Service in Illinois on June 5, 1925 from part of the Savanna Military Reservation, now the Savanna Army Depot, with 10,710 acres (43.3 km^{2}). On June 15, 1926 Savanna was renamed Bellevue-Savanna National Forest. The forest was abolished on July 15, 1954.
