= Colorado National Forest =

Former national forest in Colorado

Colorado National Forest was established in Colorado on July 1, 1910, with 659,780 acres (2,670.0 km^{2}) from Medicine Bow National Forest. On March 28, 1932, it was renamed Roosevelt National Forest.
