= Crook National Forest =

Formerly named national forest in Arizona

Coordinates: 32°45′01″N 110°15′03″W

Crook National Forest was established in Arizona by the U.S. Forest Service on July 1, 1908, with 788,624 acres (3,191.45 km^{2}) from portions of Tonto National Forest, Mount Graham National Forest, and other lands. On July 1, 1953, Crook was divided among Tonto, Gila, and Coronado National Forests.
