= Manzano National Forest =

Former national forest in New Mexico

Manzano National Forest was established as the Manzano Forest Reserve by the U.S. Forest Service in New Mexico on November 6, 1906 with 459,726 acres (1,860.45 km^{2}). It became a National Forest on March 4, 1907. On April 16, 1908 Mount Taylor National Forest and other lands were added. On September 10, 1914 Zuni National Forest was added. On December 3, 1931 the name was changed to Cibola National Forest and further lands were added.

The Manzano tract is part of the Mountainair Ranger District of Cibola National Forest, in the Manzano Mountains to the south of Albuquerque, beyond the Isleta Indian Reservation.
