= Vernon National Forest =

National forest in Utah, U.S.

Coordinates: 39.9265°N 112.4119°W

Vernon National Forest was established as the Vernon Forest Reserve by the U.S. Forest Service in Utah on April 24, 1906, with 68,800 acres (278 km^{2}) in the northwestern part of the state near the town of Vernon. It became a National Forest on March 4, 1907. On July 1, 1908, Vernon and Payson National Forests and part of Fillmore were combined to create Nebo National Forest. The lands presently managed under the Uinta-Wasatch-Cache National Forest.

== See also ==
- Harker Canyon (Tooele County, Utah)
