= Marquette National Forest =

Former national forest in Michigan

Coordinates: 46°20′N 84°50′W

Marquette National Forest was established by the U.S. Forest Service in Chippewa County, Michigan on February 10, 1909, with 30,603 acres (123.8 km^{2}). On July 1, 1915, the entire forest was transferred to Michigan National Forest and the name was discontinued. On February 12, 1931, Marquette was re-established in Chippewa and Mackinac counties with 274,910 acres (1,112.5 km^{2}), changing its name back from Michigan. On February 9, 1962, the entire forest was transferred to Hiawatha National Forest and the name was re-discontinued. What was Marquette National Forest currently comprises the East Unit of Hiawatha National Forest.
