= Whitman National Forest =

Former national forest in Oregon

Coordinates: 45.00°N 118.25°W

Whitman National Forest was established in Oregon on July 1, 1908 with 1,234,020 acres (4,993.9 km^{2}) from part of Blue Mountains National Forest. On June 20, 1920 part of Minam National Forest was added. In 1954 it was administratively combined with Wallowa National Forest to make Wallowa–Whitman National Forest. In descending order of forest land area, Whitman National Forest is located in parts of Baker, Union, Grant, Wallowa, Umatilla, and Malheur counties. There are local ranger district offices in Baker City, Halfway, and Unity. Its administrative headquarters are in Baker City, as part of the Wallowa-Whitman National Forest. As of September 30, 2008, Whitman had an area of 1,266,902 acres (5,126.97 km^{2}), representing 55.96% of the combined forest's 2,263,965 acres (9,161.94 km^{2}).
