= Vegas National Forest =

Former national forest in Nevada, U.S.

Vegas National Forest was established in Nevada on December 12, 1907 with 195,840 acres (792.5 km^{2}). On July 1, 1908 it was absorbed by Moapa National Forest and the name was discontinued. The lands exist presently as part of Toiyabe National Forest.
