= Cochetopa National Forest =

Former national forest in Colorado

Coordinates: 38.192°N 106.625°W

Cochetopa National Forest was established in Colorado on July 1, 1908 with 932,890 acres (3,775.3 km^{2}), renamed from Cochetopah National Forest. On May 26, 1930 it received land from Leadville National Forest. On July 1, 1944 Cochetopa was broken up between Gunnison, Rio Grande and San Isabel National Forests.
