= Michigan National Forest =

Former national forest in Michigan

Coordinates: 46°6′N 86°38′W

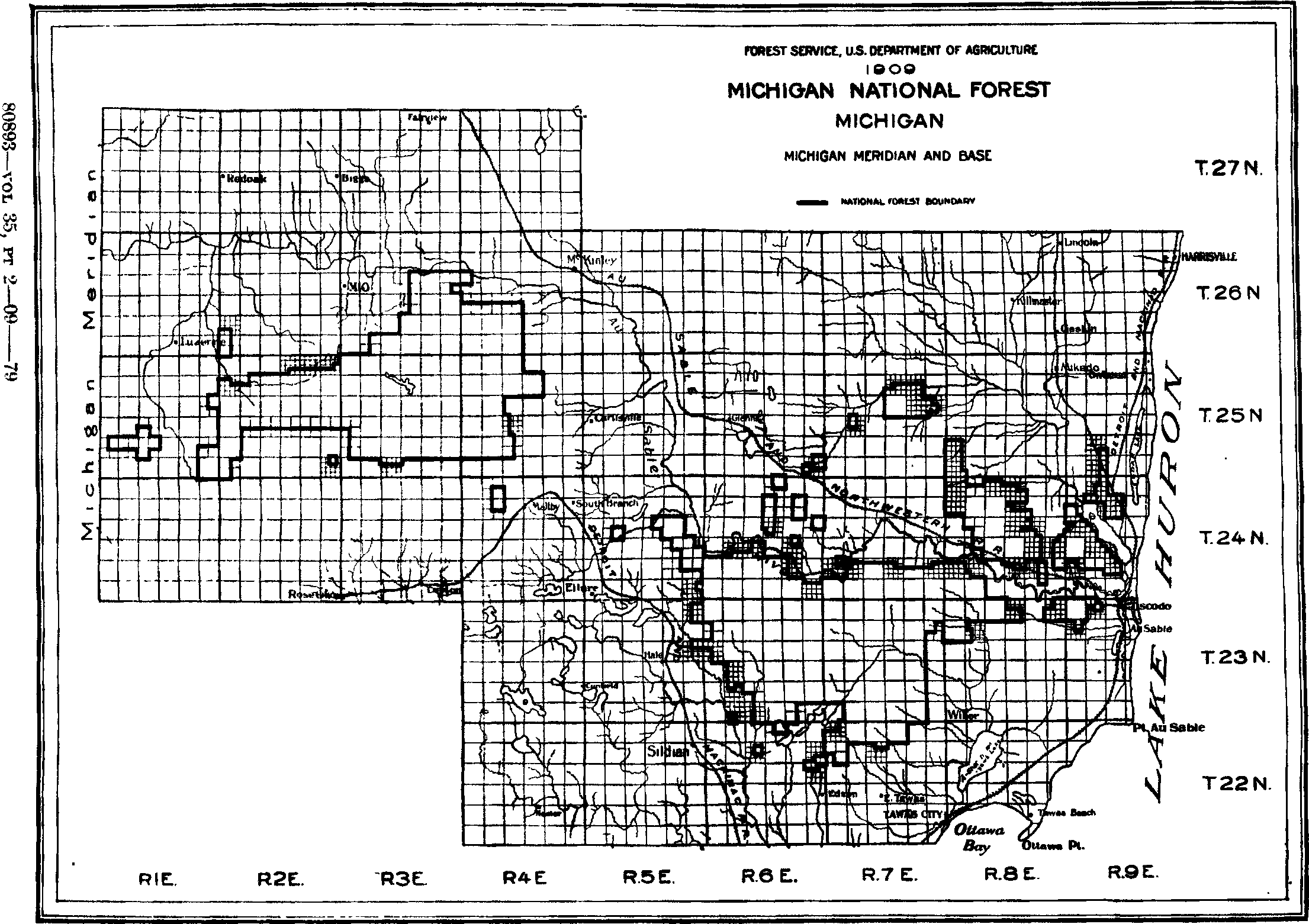
1909 map of the forest from the United States Statutes at Large Volume 35

Michigan National Forest was established by the U.S. Forest Service in Michigan on February 11, 1909 with 132,770 acres (537.3 km^{2}). On July 1, 1915 Marquette National Forest was added. On February 12, 1931 the name was changed to Marquette National Forest. The lands presently exist in Hiawatha National Forest.
