= Ouray National Forest =

Former national forest in Colorado

Ouray National Forest was established by the U.S. Forest Service in Colorado on February 22, 1907, with 273,175 acres (1,105.50 km^{2}). On July 1, 1908, the entire forest was divided between Montezuma National Forest and Uncompahgre National Forest and the name was discontinued.
