= Crow Creek National Forest =

Former National Forest in Wyoming

Crow Creek National Forest was established as the Crow Creek Forest Reserve in Wyoming by the United States General Land Office on October 10, 1900, with 56,320 acres (227.9 km^{2}). After the transfer of federal forests to the U.S. Forest Service in 1905, it became a National Forest on March 4, 1907. On July 1, 1908, it was combined with part of Medicine Bow National Forest to create Cheyenne National Forest. The name was discontinued, and the Cheyenne was renamed Medicine Bow in 1910.
