= Cheyenne National Forest =

Former National Forest in Wyoming, US

Cheyenne National Forest was established in Wyoming by the U.S. Forest Service on July 1, 1908, with 617,932 acres (2,500.68 km^{2}) from part of Medicine Bow National Forest and all of Crow Creek National Forest. On July 1, 1910, a portion was eliminated and the remainder renamed Medicine Bow National Forest.
