= Montezuma National Forest =

Former national forest in Colorado

Montezuma National Forest was established as the Montezuma Forest Reserve by the U.S. Forest Service in Colorado on June 13, 1905 with 576,719 acres (2,333.90 km^{2}). It became a National Forest on March 4, 1907. On July 1, 1908 part of Ouray National Forest was added. On July 1, 1947 the entire forest was divided between San Juan National Forest and Uncompahgre National Forest and the name was discontinued.
