= Tumacacori National Forest =

Former National Forest name

Coordinates: 31.4865°N 111.1366°W

Tumacacori National Forest was established as the Tumacacori Forest Reserve by the U.S. Forest Service in Arizona on November 7, 1906, with 203,550 acres (823.7 km^{2}). It became a National Forest on March 4, 1907. On July 1, 1908, the entire forest was combined with Baboquivari National Forest and Huachuca National Forest to establish Garces National Forest, and the name was discontinued. The lands are presently included in Coronado National Forest.

The forest lands were southwest of Tumacacori, Arizona in Santa Cruz County, and include part of the Pajarito Mountains. The lands are presently administered by the Nogales Ranger District of Coronado.
