= Coronado National Forest =

Managed forest in southern Arizona and New Mexico

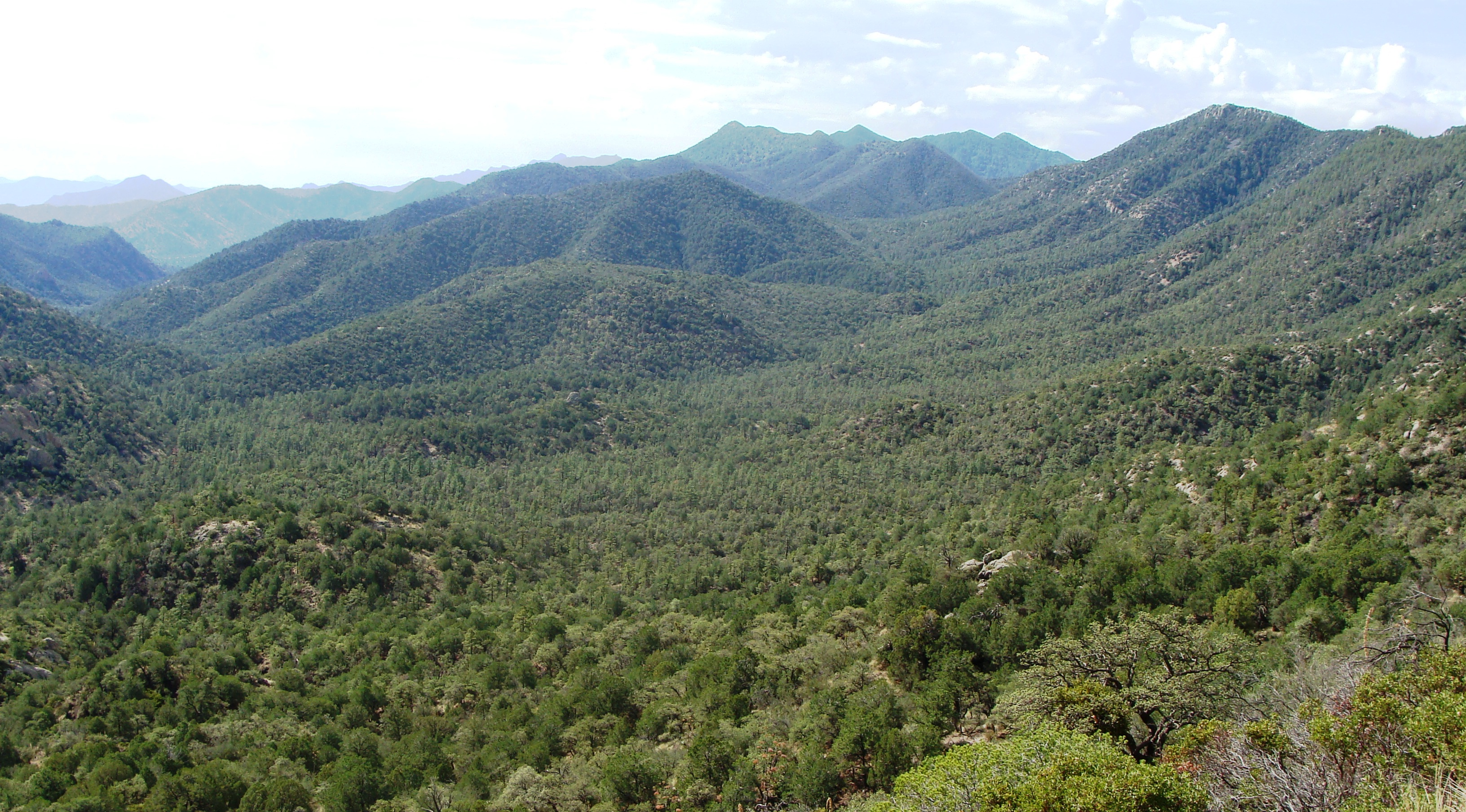
- Coronado National Forest and Chiricahua Mountains in southern Arizona

- Location within Arizona Location within the United States
- Location: Arizona and New Mexico, US
- Nearest city: Tucson, Arizona, US
- Coordinates: 31°59′47″N 110°18′32″W
- Area: 1,780,000 acres (720,000 ha)
- Established: April 11, 1902; 124 years ago
- Governing body: US Forest Service
- Website: Coronado National Forest

The Coronado National Forest is a United States National Forest that includes an area of about 1.78 million acres (7,200 km^{2}) spread throughout mountain ranges in southeastern Arizona and southwestern New Mexico.

It is located in parts of Cochise, Graham, Santa Cruz, Pima, and Pinal Counties in Arizona, and Hidalgo County in New Mexico.

== History ==
In 1902, the land that is now part of Coronado National Forest was included as part of the Santa Rita Forest Reserve. This was transferred to the U.S. Forest Service in 1905, and the Coronado National Forest was established in 1908.

During a gender reveal party on April 23, 2017, the Sawmill Fire ignited and went out of control. The fire went on for many days. Approximately 47,000 acres (19,000 ha) were burnt. The person behind the fire was an off-duty US Border Patrol agent. He was fined and given probation.

The Arizona Department of Emergency and Military Affairs constructed a 3,800-foot (1,200 m) length of wall in 2022 on federal and tribal lands near Yuma, without federal permission. The National Forest Supervisor told the state to refrain from placing more shipping containers along the Arizona border with Mexico without obtaining proper authorization. Governor Doug Ducey filed a lawsuit in October against federal agencies that have sought to force the removal of the initial 130 containers used as a wall on the border. Governor-elect Katie Hobbs had stated an intention to remove the containers after taking office. The State has agreed to remove the containers starting January 2023.

== Administration ==
The national forest is divided into five ranger districts, which are not contiguous; each consists of multiple sky island mountain ranges.

The Santa Catalina Ranger District near the city of Tucson comprises the Santa Catalina and Rincon Mountains. Included in this area are the highest peak of the Santa Catalinas, Mount Lemmon, the rugged Pusch Ridge Wilderness Area, and the popular Sabino Canyon. Much of this district was part of Santa Catalina National Forest before its inclusion in Coronado.

The Safford Ranger District comprises the mountain ranges surrounding the city of Safford, Arizona. These five ranges are the Pinaleño, Galiuro, Santa Teresa, Winchester, and Greasewood Mountains. Included in this area is the highest peak of the Pinaleños, Mount Graham. Mount Graham National Forest was a formerly separate national forest, combined into Crook National Forest on July 1, 1908. In 1953, part of Crook was absorbed into Coronado.

The Nogales Ranger District comprises four mountain ranges north and west of Nogales, Arizona. These ranges are the Santa Rita, Tumacacori, Pajarito, and San Luis Mountains. Included in this area are Mount Hopkins, Mount Wrightson, and Madera Canyon, all located in the Santa Ritas. In the early 20th century, this area included two national forests which were absorbed into Coronado: Santa Rita National Forest and Tumacacori National Forest.

The Douglas Ranger District comprises three mountain ranges north and east of Douglas, Arizona. These ranges are the Chiricahua, Dragoon, and Peloncillo Mountains. A portion of the ranger district in the Peloncillos extends into New Mexico. The district comprises three formerly separate national forests: Chiricahua National Forest, Dragoon National Forest, and Peloncillo National Forest, all combined into Coronado.

The Sierra Vista Ranger District comprises three mountain ranges west of Sierra Vista, Arizona. These ranges are the Huachuca, Patagonia, and Whetstone Mountains. Included in this area is the highest peak in the Huachucas, Miller Peak, and the region of the Huachucas known as Canelo Hills. The district includes the formerly separate Huachuca National Forest.

== Wilderness ==
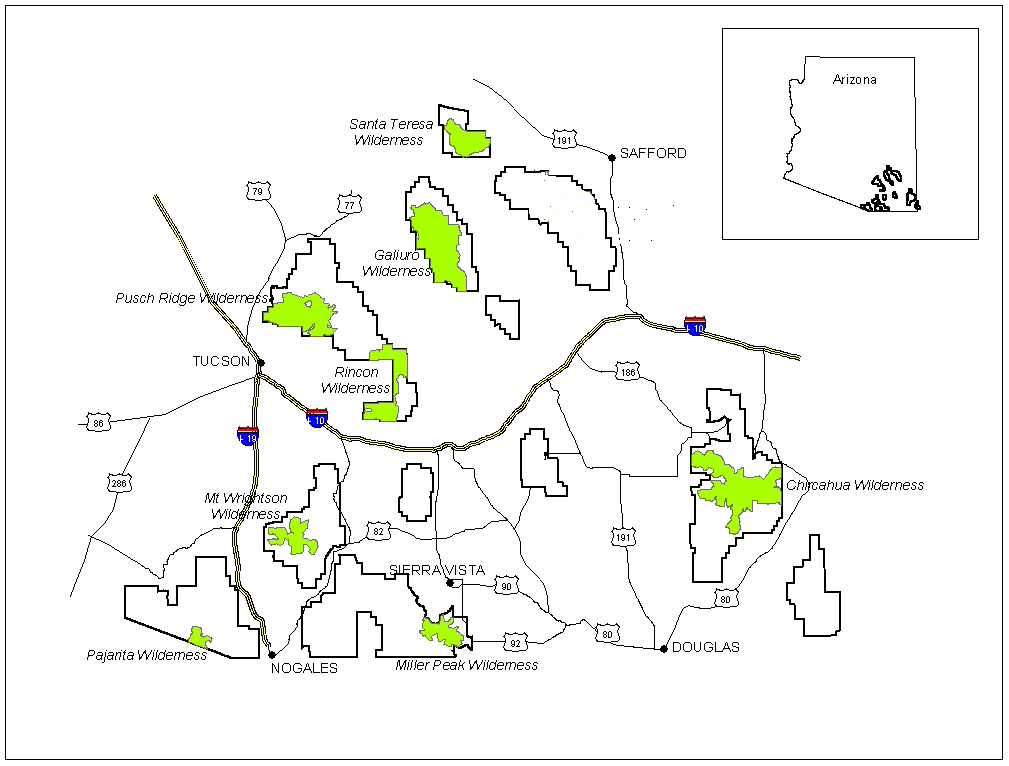
Wilderness areas in the Coronado National Forest

The Coronado National Forest contains eight designated wilderness areas, with at least one in each ranger district. Congress defines "wilderness" as an area "untrammeled by man". Common activities in the Coronado National Forest wilderness areas include hiking, horseback riding, camping, hunting, and fishing. The use of mechanized or motorized equipment, including bicycles, generators, and chain saws, is prohibited.

- Chiricahua Wilderness (Douglas District)
- Galiuro Wilderness (Safford District)
- Miller Peak Wilderness (Sierra Vista District)
- Mount Wrightson Wilderness (Nogales District)
- Pajarita Wilderness (Nogales District)
- Pusch Ridge Wilderness (Santa Catalina District)
- Rincon Wilderness (Santa Catalina District)
- Santa Teresa Wilderness (Safford District)

== Campgrounds ==
The public campgrounds located within the Coronado National Forest, most of which require a daily/nightly fee (see Coronado National Forest official website for accurate and current details), are as follows:

Campground	Elevation	Fee	Mountain range
Arcadia	6,700	Yes	Pinaleño Mountains
Bathtub	6,300	Yes	Chiricahua Mountains
Bog Springs	5,200	Yes	Santa Rita Mountains
Cochise Stronghold	5,000	Yes	Dragoon Mountains
Cunningham	9,000	Yes	Pinaleño Mountains
Cypress Park	6,000	Yes	Chiricahua Mountains
General Hitchcock	6,000	Yes	Santa Catalina Mountains
Gordon Hirabayashi	5,000	Yes	Santa Catalina Mountains
Herb Martyr	5,800	Yes	Chiricahua Mountains
Hospital Flat	9,000	Yes	Pinaleño Mountains
Idlewilde	5,000	Yes	Chiricahua Mountains
John Hands	5,600	No	Chiricahua Mountains
Lakeview (Parker Cyn Lake)	5,400	Yes	Huachuca Mountains (Canelo Hills)
Molino Basin	4,500	Yes	Santa Catalina Mountains
Peppersauce	4,700	Yes	Santa Catalina Mountains
Pinery Canyon	7,000	No	Chiricahua Mountains
Ramsey Vista	7,400	Yes	Huachuca Mountains
Reef Townsite	7,200	Yes	Huachuca Mountains
Riggs Flat	8,600	Yes	Pinaleño Mountains
Rose Canyon	7,000	Yes	Santa Catalina Mountains
Rucker Forest Camp	6,500	Yes	Chiricahua Mountains
Rucker Lake	6,300	Yes	Chiricahua Mountains
Rustler Park	8,500	Yes	Chiricahua Mountains
Shannon	9,100	Yes	Pinaleño Mountains
Soldier Creek	9,300	Yes	Pinaleño Mountains
Spencer Canyon	8,000	Yes	Santa Catalina Mountains
Stewart	5,100	Yes	Chiricahua Mountains
Stockton Pass	5,600	No	Pinaleño Mountains
Sunny Flat	5,200	Yes	Chiricahua Mountains
Sycamore	6,200	Yes	Chiricahua Mountains
W Turkey Creek	5,900	Yes	Chiricahua Mountains
White Rock	4,000	Yes	Tumacacori Mountains

== See also ==
- List of national forests of the United States
- Aspen Fire
- Cumero Fire
- Sawmill Fire
