= Imnaha National Forest =

National forest in Oregon, USA

Coordinates: 45.15°N 116.96°W

Imnaha National Forest was established in Oregon on March 1, 1907 with 1,750,240 acres (7,083.0 km^{2}) when the first Wallowa National Forest and Chenismus National Forest were combined. Its lands presently exist as part of Wallowa–Whitman National Forest.

It is adjacent to Hells Canyon National Recreation Area.
