= Plum Creek Timber Land =

Former national forest in Colorado

The Plum Creek Timber Land was established by the United States General Land Office in Colorado on June 23, 1892, with 179,200 acres (725 km^{2}). On May 12, 1905, the forest was consolidated with Pike's Peak Forest Reserve and the name was discontinued.
