= San Mateo National Forest =

Former national forest in New Mexico

San Mateo National Forest was established as the San Mateo Forest Reserve by the U.S. Forest Service in New Mexico on November 5, 1906 with 424,663 acres (1,718.55 km^{2}). It became a National Forest on March 4, 1907. On July 1, 1908 the entire forest was added to Magdalena National Forest and the name was discontinued.
