= Rainier National Forest =

Former protected area in Washington, United States

Coordinates: 46.6331°N 121.9553°W

Rainier National Forest (/reɪˈnɪər/ ray-NEER) was established in Washington on March 2, 1907, when its name was changed from Mount Rainier Forest Reserve. The Mount Rainier Forest Reserve was established by the United States General Land Office on February 22, 1897 (effective March 1, 1898) from the Pacific Forest Reserve and other lands with 2,234,880 acres (9,044.2 km^{2}). In 1905 federal forests were transferred to the U.S. Forest Service. On October 13, 1933, Rainier was divided between Columbia, Snoqualmie and Wenatchee National Forests. Its lands exists presently as portions of Mount Baker-Snoqualmie, Wenatchee and Gifford Pinchot National Forests.
