= Charleston National Forest =

Former national forest in Nevada

Charleston National Forest was established as the Charleston Forest Reserve in Nevada by the U.S. Forest Service on November 5, 1906 with 149,165 acres (603.65 km^{2}). It became a National Forest on March 4, 1907. On July 1, 1908 it was absorbed by Moapa National Forest and the name was discontinued. The lands exist presently as part of Toiyabe National Forest, and portions comprise Spring Mountains National Recreation Area.
