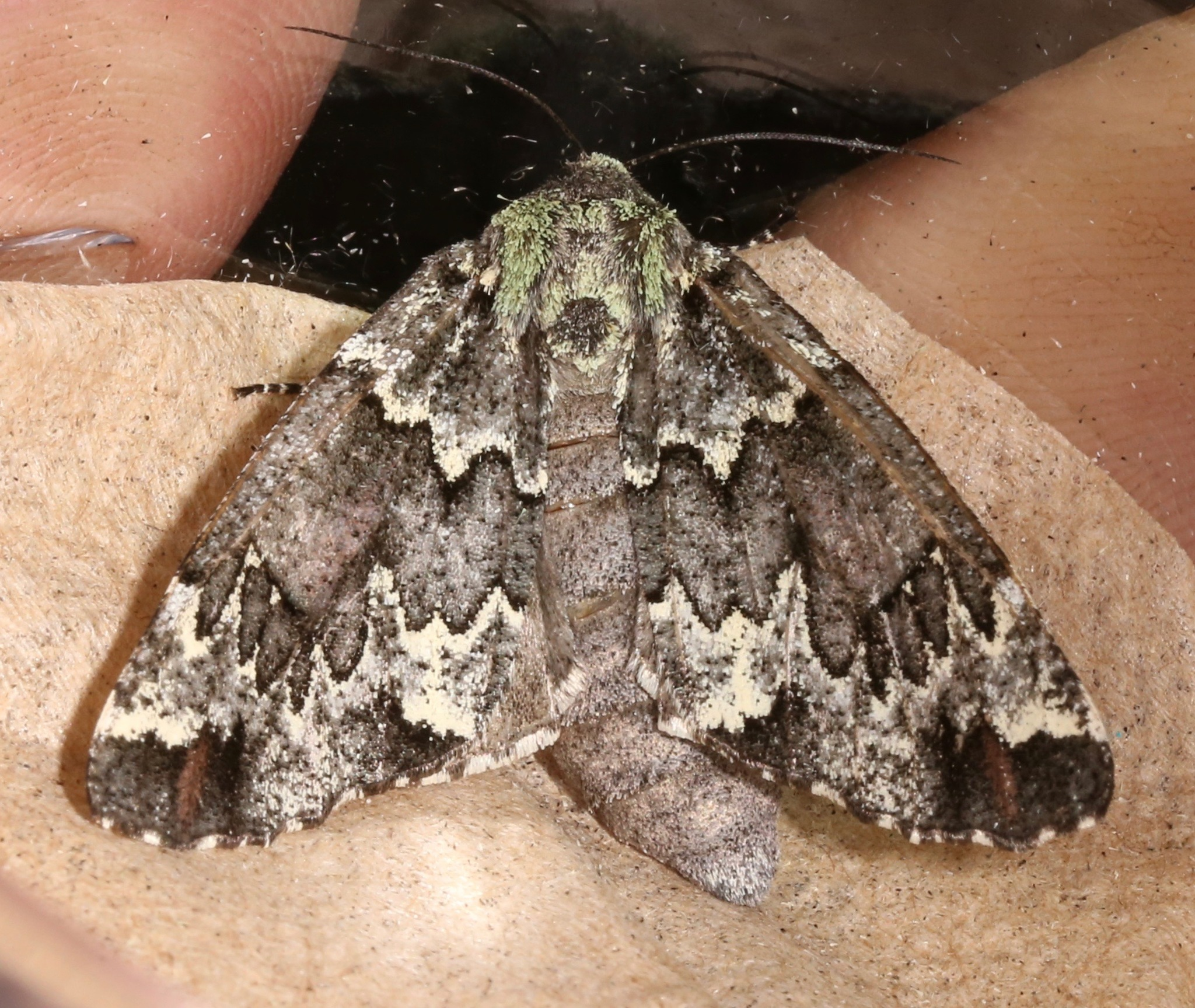
- Chiricahua lichenaria

Scientific classification
- Kingdom: Animalia
- Phylum: Arthropoda
- Clade: Pancrustacea
- Class: Insecta
- Order: Lepidoptera
- Family: Geometridae
- Tribe: Nacophorini
- Genus: Chiricahua; Ferris, 2010

= Chiricahua (moth) =

Genus of moths

Chiricahua is a genus of geometrid moths in the family Geometridae. There are at least two described species in the genus Chiricahua.

== Species ==
These two species belong to the genus Chiricahua:

- Chiricahua lichenaria Ferris, 2010^{i g}
- Chiricahua multidentata (Guedet, 1941)^{i g b}

Data sources: i = ITIS, c = Catalogue of Life, g = GBIF, b = Bugguide.net
