= Knox National Forest =

Former national forest in Kentucky

Coordinates: 37°58′30″N 85°51′50″W

Knox National Forest was established in Kentucky by the U.S. Forest Service on June 5, 1925, with 22,660 acres (91.7 km^{2}) from part of the Camp Knox Military Reservation. On April 6, 1928, the executive order for its creation was rescinded and the forest was abolished.
