= Cave Hills National Forest =

National forest in South Dakota, United States

Coordinates: 45.7428°N 103.5405°W

Cave Hills National Forest was established as the Cave Hills Forest Reserve in South Dakota by the United States General Land Office March 5, 1904 with 23,360 acres (94.5 km^{2}). After the transfer of federal forests to the U.S. Forest Service in 1905, it became a National Forest on March 4, 1907. On July 1, 1908 it was absorbed by Sioux National Forest and the name was discontinued.

The forest today comprises the Cave Hills unit of the Sioux Ranger District of Custer National Forest, in Harding County, north of Buffalo.
