= Holy Cross National Forest =

Former national forest in Colorado

Coordinates: 39°32′00″N 106°28′00″W

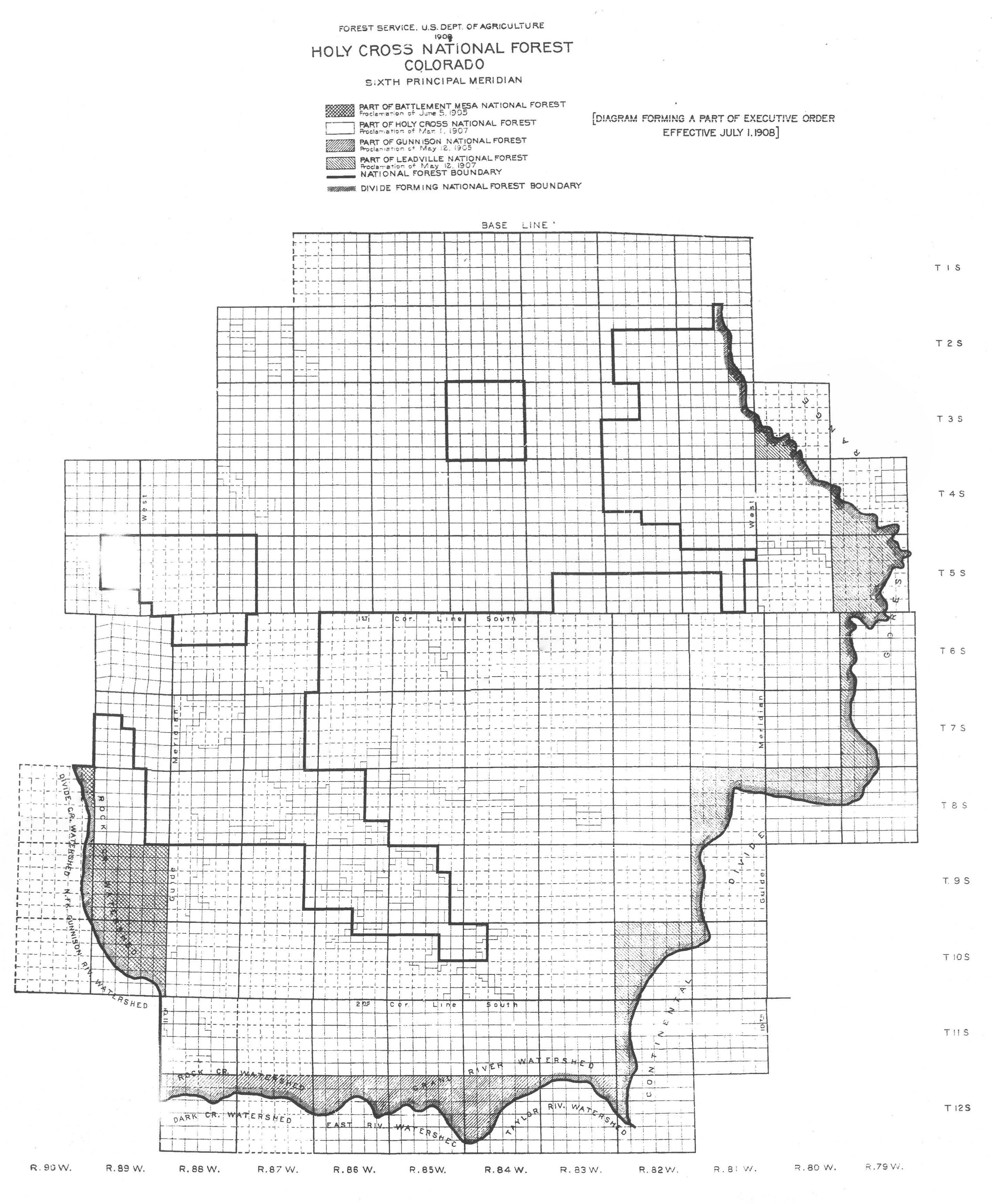
Holy Cross National Forest Executive Order 870

Holy Cross National Forest was established as the Holy Cross Forest Reserve by the U.S. Forest Service in Colorado on August 25, 1905, with 990,720 acres (4,009.3 km^{2}). It became a National Forest on March 4, 1907. On August 7, 1920 Sopris National Forest was absorbed. On January 1, 1945, the entire forest was transferred to White River National Forest and the name was discontinued.

== See also ==
- Holy Cross Wilderness
