= Sopris National Forest =

National forest in Colorado, U.S.

Sopris National Forest was established by the U.S. Forest Service in Colorado on April 26, 1909, with 655,360 acres (2,652.1 km^{2}). On August 7, 1920, the entire forest was transferred to Holy Cross National Forest and the name was discontinued. The lands are presently included in White River National Forest.
