= Mount Graham National Forest =

Former name of the Crook National Forest, Arizona

Coordinates: 32°42′N 109°52′W

The Mount Graham National Forest, named after Mount Graham in Graham County, Arizona, was established as the Mount Graham Forest Reserve by the United States General Land Office on July 22, 1902, with 118,600 acres (480 km^{2}). After the transfer of federal forests to the U.S. Forest Service in 1905, it became a national forest on March 4, 1907. On July 1, 1908, part of Mount Graham National Forest was combined with Crook National Forest and the remainder was returned to the public domain. The name was discontinued.
