= Datil National Forest =

National Forest in New Mexico, US (1908–1931)

Datil National Forest was a United States National Forest established in western New Mexico by the U.S. Forest Service in 1908. It was merged into another and ceased in 1931.

== History ==
Datil National Forest was formed from the part of the also new Gila National Forest and other public lands. It began in 1908 with 1,255,883 acres (5,082.38 km^{2}). The Magdalena National Forest and other areas were added in 1909.

The entire Datil National Forest lands were transferred to the jurisdictions of the Cibola National Forest (primarily) and Gila National Forest in 1931. The name was discontinued.

== Present day ==
The former Datil Forest area is part of the Magdalena Ranger District of the Cibola National Forest. It is located in the Datil Mountains, to the north of the town of Datil, in Catron and Socorro Counties.

== See also ==
- Mogollon-Datil volcanic field — large silicic volcanic field in western New Mexico around the town of Datil and Mogollon Mountains area.
- Datil-Mogollon Section — a physiographic subdivision of the Colorado Plateau Province in the Datil Mountains—Mogollon Mountains region.
- Forest History Society — and 'Foresthistory.org' external links below.
