= Leadville National Forest =

National Forest in Colorado, United States

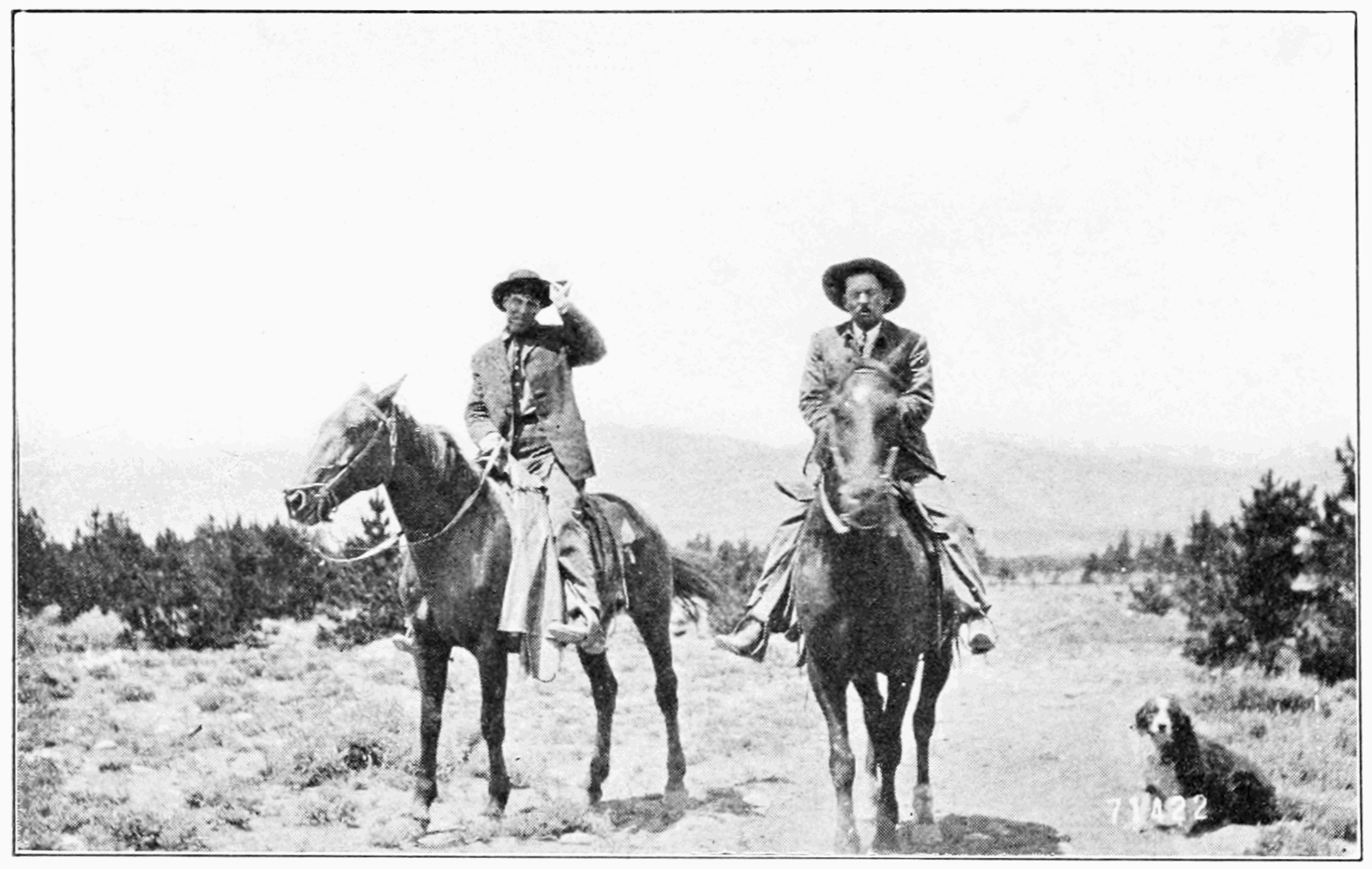
Rangers of Leadville National Forest, Colorado

Leadville National Forest was established as the Leadville Forest Reserve by the U.S. Forest Service in Colorado on May 12, 1905 with 1,219,947 acres (4,936.95 km^{2}). It became a national forest on March 4, 1907. On May 26, 1930 the entire forest was divided between Arapaho, Cochetopa and Pike National Forests and the name was discontinued.
