= Chiricahua National Forest =

Former named national forest in Arizona, US

- Location within Arizona Location within the United States
- Location: Cochise County, Arizona and Hidalgo County, New Mexico, United States
- Coordinates: 32°0′47″N 109°20′27″W
- Established: July 1, 1902

Chiricahua National Forest was established as the Chiricahua Forest Reserve in Cochise County, Arizona by the United States General Land Office on July 1, 1902, with 169,600 acres (686 km^{2}). After the transfer of federal forests to the U.S. Forest Service in 1905, it became a national forest on March 4, 1907. On July 1, 1908, it absorbed Peloncillo National Forest, including lands in Hidalgo County, New Mexico. On July 1, 1917, Chiricahua was absorbed by Coronado National Forest and the name was discontinued.

The forest included part of the Chiricahua Mountains, one of the Madrean Sky Islands. A portion of the national forest lands were transferred to the National Park Service with the establishment of Chiricahua National Monument in 1924. The remaining lands are presently administered by the Douglas Ranger District of Coronado.
