= Baker City Forest Reserve =

Former national forest in Oregon

Baker City Forest Reserve was established by the United States General Land Office in Oregon on February 5, 1904 with 52,480 acres (212.4 km^{2}). In 1905 all federal forests were transferred to the U.S. Forest Service. On March 15, 1906 portions of Baker City were combined with Blue Mountains Forest Reserve. The remainder was taken out of the Forest Service system and the name was discontinued. The lands are presently distributed among several Oregon forests.
