= Peloncillo National Forest =

US National Forest

Peloncillo National Forest was an American national forest. It was established as the Peloncillo Forest Reserve in Arizona and New Mexico on November 15, 1906, with 178,977 acres (724.29 km^{2}). It became a National Forest on March 4, 1907. On July 1, 1908 it was combined with the Chiricahua National Forest and the name was discontinued. Its lands presently exist as part of the Coronado National Forest.

Much of the forest was transferred out of the National Forest system to the Bureau of Land Management and the remainder, (now part of the Douglas Ranger District of Coronado) is at the extreme southern end of the Peloncillo Mountains in Cochise County, Arizona, and Hidalgo County, New Mexico.
