= Slim Buttes National Forest =

Former national forest in South Dakota

Coordinates: 45°30′N 103°10′W

Slim Buttes National Forest was established by the United States General Land Office as Slim Buttes Forest Reserve in South Dakota on March 5, 1904 with 58,160 acres (235.4 km^{2}). After the transfer of federal forests to the U.S. Forest Service in 1905, it became a National Forest on March 4, 1907. On July 1, 1908 it was absorbed by Sioux National Forest and the name was discontinued.

The forest today comprises the Slim Buttes unit of the Sioux Ranger District of Custer National Forest, southeast of Buffalo. Points of interest include the Reva Gap Campground along HWY 20, The Castles National Natural Landmark adjacent to the campground and the old Jesse Elliott Ranger Station.
