= Wallowa National Forest =

Former national Forest in Oregon, US

Coordinates: 45.3°N 117.0°W

Wallowa National Forest was first established as the Wallowa Forest Reserve in Oregon on May 6, 1905, with 747,200 acres (3,024 km^{2}). On March 1, 1907, it was combined with the Chenismus Forest Reserve to create Imnaha National Forest, which was then renamed Wallowa on July 1, 1908. In 1954 it was administratively combined with Whitman National Forest to make Wallowa–Whitman National Forest. The Wallowa National Forest is located overwhelmingly in Wallowa County, Oregon, but there are much smaller portions in Union County, Oregon, and Nez Perce and Idaho counties in Idaho. There are local ranger district offices in Enterprise and La Grande, both in Oregon. Forest headquarters are in Baker City, as part of Wallowa-Whitman National Forest. As of September 30, 2008, the Wallowa portion had an area of 997,063 acres (4,034.97 km^{2}), comprising about 44% of the Wallowa-Whitman's acreage.
