= Long Pine National Forest =

Unit of Custer National Forest in Montana, United States

Coordinates: 45°41′20″N 104°13′42″W

Long Pine National Forest was originally established as the Long Pine Forest Reserve in Montana on September 24, 1906 with 111,445 acres (451.00 km^{2}). It became a National Forest on March 4, 1907. On July 1, 1908 it was absorbed by Sioux National Forest and the name was discontinued.

The forest today comprises the Long Pines unit of the Sioux Ranger District of Custer National Forest, in Carter County, Montana with 320 acres in Harding County, South Dakota.

== See also ==
- List of forests in Montana
