= Ekalaka National Forest =

Unit of Custer National Forest in Montana, United States

Coordinates: 45°49′30″N 104°27′35″W

Ekalaka National Forest was established as the Ekalaka Forest Reserve in Montana on November 5, 1906, with a total area of 33,808 acres (136.82 km^{2}). It became a National Forest on March 4, 1907. On July 1, 1908, it was absorbed by Sioux National Forest and the name was discontinued.

The forest today comprises the Ekalaka Hills unit of the Sioux Ranger District of Custer National Forest, in Carter County, southeast of Ekalaka.

== See also ==
- List of forests in Montana
