= List of executive actions by Theodore Roosevelt =

The president of the United States may take any of several kinds of executive actions.

Executive orders are issued to help officers and agencies of the executive branch manage the operations within the federal government itself. Presidential memoranda are closely related, and have the force of law on the Executive Branch, but are generally considered less prestigious. Presidential memoranda do not have an established process for issuance, and unlike executive orders, they are not numbered. A presidential determination results in an official policy or position of the executive branch of the United States government. A presidential proclamation is a statement issued by a president on a matter of public policy, under specific authority granted to the president by Congress, typically on a matter of widespread interest. Administrative orders are signed documents such as notices, letters, and orders, that can be issued to conduct administrative operations of the federal government. A presidential notice or a presidential sequestration order can also be issued.

Listed below are executive orders numbered 141–1050 and presidential proclamations signed by United States President Theodore Roosevelt (1901–1909). He issued 1081 executive orders. His executive orders are also listed on Wikisource, along with his presidential proclamations.

Signature of Theodore Roosevelt

== Executive orders ==
=== 1901 ===
Relative No.	Absolute No.	Title/Description	Date signed
1	141	Authorizing Appointment of Clerk in Pension Agency in Philadelphia Without Examination	October 31, 1901
2	142	Authorizing Appointment of Steward in White House Without Examination	November 1, 1901
3	143	Authorizing Appointment of Coachman in Navy Department Without Examination	November 6, 1901
4	144	Amending Civil Service Rules to Make Certain United States Army Positions Subject to Classification	November 18, 1901
5	145	Amending Civil Service Rules Permitting Superintendents of Indian Training Schools to be Classified	November 26, 1901
6	146	Amending Civil Service Rules Regarding Wavier of Apportionment Provisions for Transfers	November 26, 1901
7	147	Amending Civil Service Rules Regarding Classification of Post Office Personnel	November 27, 1901
8	148	Prescribing Procedure for Dismissal of Persons in Violation of Civil Service Act or Rules	December 11, 1901
9	149	Amending Civil Service Rules Providing that Public Officers Cooperate with Civil Service Commission Investigations	December 11, 1901
10	150	Amending Civil Service Rules to Prohibit Transfer of Persons Who Have not Served Six Months in Classified Position	December 11, 1901
11	151	Amending Civil Service Rules to Provide for Appointment from Incomplete Registers	December 11, 1901
12	152	Amending Civil Service Rules Regarding Age Limitations in Post Office Service	December 23, 1901
13	153	Amending Civil Service Rules Regarding Age Limitations in Post Office Service for War Veterans	December 27, 1901

=== 1902 ===
Relative No.	Absolute No.	Title/Description	Date signed
14	154	Authorizing Appointment of Assistant Commissioner of Immigrations in New York Without Examination	January 18, 1902
15	155	Amending Civil Service Rules Regarding Exceptions from Examination for Draftsmen in Navy Department	January 20, 1902
16	156	Amending Civil Service Rules Regarding Age Limitations in Coast and Geodetic Survey	January 21, 1902
17	157	Amending Civil Service Rules to Except Four Interior Department Special Inspectors from Examination	January 23, 1902
18	158	Amending Civil Service Rules to Remove Provision Allowing Reinstatement After Dismissal	January 23, 1902
19	159	Amending Civil Service Rules to Prohibit Transfers Except to Positions in Same Class	January 23, 1902
20	160	Requiring that Lists of All Positions Deemed Unclassified be Submitted to Civil Service Commission	January 23, 1902
21	161	Amending Civil Service Rules Regarding Temporary Appointments	January 24, 1902
22	162	Designating Reception Committee for Prince Henry of Prussia	January 24, 1902
23	163	Soliciting Increase in Pay or Influencing Legislation by Employees of the United States	January 31, 1902
24	164	Amending Civil Service Rules Allowing Transfers of Certain Personnel in Treasury Department	February 4, 1902
25	165	John P. Green, Classified as Postage Stamp Agent Without Examination or Certification in Regard to Civil Service Rules	February 7, 1902
26	166	Amending Civil Service Rules to Except from Classification Certain Marine Hospital Service Personnel	February 8, 1902
27	167	Amending Consular Regulations of 1896, Paragraph 692, Regarding Currency Certificates	March 10, 1902
28	168	Amending Civil Service Rules to Require Examination Before Transfer from Positions which Became Classified	March 13, 1902
29	169	Amending Civil Service Rules Regarding Transfer After Reinstatement	March 13, 1902
30	170	Amending Consular Regulations Regarding Appointments to Office from Foreign States	March 24, 1902
31	171	Forbidding Criticisms of Diplomatic and Consular Service Officers by Others in Either Service Unless Confidential	April 25, 1902
32	172	Amending Civil Service Rules Regarding Exceptions from Examination for Certain Workers in Navy Department	April 30, 1902
33	173	Declaration of the Meaning of Section 8, Rule II, of the Civil Service Rules	May 29, 1902
34	174	Authorizing Appointment of Assistant Commissioner of Immigration in New York Without Examination	June 2, 1902
35	175	Authorizing Transfer of Alexander C. Caine as Disbursing Clerk in Justice Department Without Regard to Civil Service Rules	June 21, 1902
36	176	Amending Civil Service Rules to Make Certain Aliens Qualify for Copperplate Map Engraver Position	June 28, 1902
37	177	Amending Civil Service Rules Regarding Recommendations for Promotion	July 3, 1902
38	178	Prescribing Manner for Appointment of Unclassified Laborers in Executive Departments and Independent Officers	July 3, 1902
39	179	Amending Civil Service Rules to Allow Transfer of Certain Former Employees in the Military Government in Cuba	July 3, 1902
40	180	Permitting Issuance of Passports to Residents of Insular Possessions of United States	July 19, 1902
41	181	Rules Governing the Granting and Issuing of Passports in the United States	July 19, 1902
42	182	Rules Governing the Granting and Issuing of Passports in the Insular Possessions of the United States	July 19, 1902
43	183	Amending Civil Service Rules to Except Clerk in New York Immigration Office from Examination	July 21, 1902
44	184	Amending Civil Service Rules to Except Lawyer in New York Immigration Office from Examination	July 21, 1902
45	185	Amending Civil Service Rules to Except War Department Clerk in White House Duty from Examination	July 30, 1902
46	186	Amending Civil Service Rules to Except Solicitor at Port of New York from Examination	August 2, 1902
47	187	Amending Civil Service Rules to Except from Classification Temporary Marine Hospital Service Personnel	August 16, 1902
48	188	Directing that Raplie M. Cheshire be Recertified for Appointment	September 4, 1902
49	189	Authorizing Appointment of David Lynch for Duty in the Signal Service Without Examination Under Civil Service Rules	September 4, 1902
50	190	Closing of all Executive Departments for Observance of the Grand Army of the Republic Parade, October 8, 1902	September 10, 1902
51	191	Authorizing Retention of Workers on Government Printing Office Building Construction Without Regard to Civil Service Rules During Work on War College and Washington Barracks	October 4, 1902
52	192	Amending Civil Service Rules Regarding Apportionment Striking Section 6 of Rule VIII	October 14, 1902
53	193	Ordering Reaffirmation and Enforcement of Regulations Governing the Soliciting of Contributions for Political Purposes by and From Government Officers or Employees	October 18, 1902
54	194	Amending Consular Regulations of 1896, Paragraph 660, to Except Gold or Silver Bullion as Money or Currency	November 6, 1902
55	194-A	Duties of Secretary to the President Defined	December 8, 1902
56	195	Authorizing Appointment of F. L. Templeton as Clerk in Post Office Department Without Regard to Civil Service Rules	December 23, 1902
57	196	Authorizing Appointment of Charles W. Newton as Physician in Western Navajo Agency Without Examination	December 27, 1902

=== 1903 ===
Relative No.	Absolute No.	Title/Description	Date signed
58	197	Authorizing Reinstatement of Stanislaus M. Hamilton as Clerk in Department of State Without Regard to Civil Service Rules	January 7, 1903
59	198	Authorizing Extension of Temporary Appointment of Eight Clerks in Internal Revenue Service for Sixty Days	January 10, 1903
60	199	Amending Civil Service Rules to Require Certification of Laborers Who Perform Work of Grade of Classified Employees	January 19, 1903
61	199-A	Placing the Midway Islands Under the Jurisdiction and Control of the Navy Department	January 20, 1903
62	200	Amending Civil Service Rules to Prohibit Certain Transfers if Position Can be Filled by Promotion	January 21, 1903
63	201	Authorizing Appointment of F. A. Collins as Private Secretary to the Public Printer Without Examination	January 30, 1903
64	202	Authorizing Reinstatement of Oscar Wenderoth as Senior Draftsman in Treasury Department Without Regard to Civil Service Rules	February 6, 1903
65	203	Authorizing Permanent Appointment of Temporary Clerks at Naval Stations in Insular Possessions	February 11, 1903
66	204	Removing Civil Service Rule Provision which Allowed Aliens to Qualify for Copperplate Map Engraver Position	February 19, 1903
67	205	Authorizing Appointment of Translator in Bureau of Insular Affairs Without Examination	March 7, 1903
68	206	Transferring Revolutionary Archives from the State Department to the Library of Congress	March 9, 1903
69	207	Authorizing Appointment of Horatio C. Pollock as Clerk at Military Headquarters in Philippine Islands Without Examination	March 9, 1903
70	208	Authorizing Appointment of William J. Lee as Telegrapher in Department of Commerce and Labor Without Examination	March 12, 1903
71	209	Prescribing Civil Service Rules in Lieu of Rules of May 6, 1896	March 20, 1903
72	210	Appointment of Unclassified Laborers Outside of Washington, D.C.	March 26, 1903
73	211	Authorizing Appointment of James A. Dumont as Inspector of Hulls in Steamboat Inspection Service Without Regard to Civil Service Rules	March 26, 1903
74	212	Authorizing Transfer of Exum L. Holland to Inspector in Customs Service Without Regard to Civil Service Rules	March 30, 1903
75	213	Clarifying that Civil Service Rules of March 20, 1903 do not give Permanent Appointment to Employees Serving under Rule VIII, Sections 13-16 of Rules of 1896	March 31, 1903
76	214	Requiring Executive Departments to Furnish Information to Secretary of the Interior for Preparation of Official Register	March 31, 1903
77	215	Authorizing Appointment of Albert U. Wyman as Clerk in Office of the Treasurer Without Examination	April 29, 1903
78	216	Authorizing Permanent Appointment of Lucas Blanco as Messenger in Customs Service Without Examination	April 29, 1903
79	217	Amending Consular Regulations of 1896, Paragraph 463, on Issuance of Circulars	June 6, 1903
80	218	Certain Property at Ponce, Mayaguez, and San Juan, Porto Rico, Reserved for Use of Courts, District Attorney, and Marshal	June 29, 1903
81	219	Reserving Certain Lands in Puerto Rico for Naval Purposes; Submission of Memoranda of Understanding Concerning Use of Said Lands by Secretary of Navy and Governor of Puerto Rico Permitted	June 30, 1903
82	220	Eliminating Lands and Building Known as The Presidio, San Juan, Porto Rico, from Operation of Proclamation of June 26, 1903	June 30, 1903
83	221	Authorizing Reinstatement of Charles B. Terry as Clerk in Post Office Department Without Examination	July 3, 1903
84	222	Prescribing Manner of Examination for Unskilled Labor Positions and Veterans of the Civil War	July 8, 1903
85	223	Authorizing Appointment of Ten Persons to Positions in Department of Commerce and Labor Without Examination	July 13, 1903
86	224	Authorizing Reinstatement of Sarah McLanahan as Sewer in Government Printing Office Without Regard to Civil Service Rules	July 25, 1903
87	225	Approving the Extension of Certain Temporary Employees Without Regard to Civil Service Rules	July 29, 1903
88	226	Authorizing Reinstatement of Annie M. West and Sadie B. Yates to Positions in Government Printing Office	July 29, 1903
89	227	Authorizing Appointment of Luther M. Walter as Law Clerk in Interstate Commerce Commission Upon Noncompetitive Examination	July 30, 1903
90	228	Extending Time Limit for Completion of Work of the Spanish Treaty Claims Commission to March 2, 1904	August 1, 1903
91	229	Authorizing Appointment of Julia W. Wellborn as Clerk in the Geological Survey Without Examination	August 9, 1903
92	230	Amending Civil Service Rules Regarding Exceptions from Examination	August 10, 1903
93	231	Authorizing Employment of Allen Hazen as Engineer in Washington Filtration Plant for Two Years	August 17, 1903
94	232	Authorizing Appointment of Dr. William A. White as Superintendent of the Government Hospital for the Insane Without Examination	August 20, 1903
95	233	Authorizing Transfer of W. E. Lackland to Post-Office at Prescott, Arizona, Without Regard to Civil Service Rules	August 26, 1903
96	234	Authorizing Reinstatement of Emma J. Rawlings as Teller in the Treasury Department	August 27, 1903
97	235	Rules Governing the Granting and Issuing of Passports in the United States	September 12, 1903
98	236	Authorizing Appointment of Clarence A. Cook as Special Agent in Department of Commerce and Labor Without Examination	October 9, 1903
99	237	Authorizing Reinstatement of Lillian B. Kellogg as Sewer in Government Printing Office Without Regard to Civil Service Rules	October 23, 1903
100	238	Authorizing Appointment of Mrs. Roy L. Quackenbush as Clerk in Post Office Department Without Examination	November 2, 1903
101	239	Authorizing Appointment of Francis L. Hawes as Special Agent in Bureau of Corporations Without Examination	December 4, 1903
102	240	Prohibiting Use of Official Letterheads and Signatures by Consular Officers on Private Correspondence	December 5, 1903
103	241	Reserving All Lands on Certain Alaska Islands, including Kiska Island, Little Kiska Island, and Adjacent Islets For Naval Purposes	December 9, 1903
104	242	Authorizing Reinstatement of Mrs. Frank L. Harrigan as Machine Feeder in Government Printing Office Without Regard to Civil Service Rules	December 28, 1903

=== 1904 ===
Relative No.	Absolute No.	Title/Description	Date signed
105	243	Authorizing Reinstatement of Evelyn M. Ford as Clerk in the War Department Without Regard to Civil Service Rules	January 4, 1904
106	244	Authorizing Appointment of Mrs. G. W. Shipman as Clerk in Office of the First Assistant Postmaster-General Without Examination	January 7, 1904
107	245	Authorizing Reinstatement of Elizabeth C. Peters as Sewer in Government Printing Office Without Regard to Civil Service Rules	January 9, 1904
108	246	Extending Time Limit for Completion of Work of the Spanish Treaty Claims Commission to September 2, 1904	January 12, 1904
109	247	Authorizing Appointment of E. W. Libbey as Operator in Department of Commerce and Labor without Examination	January 27, 1904
110	248	Authorizing Reinstatement of Kate L. Croggan as Sewer in Government Printing Office Without Regard to Civil Service Rules	February 1, 1904
111	249	Authorizing Employment of James M. Cooper and Ralston Williams by Medical Board Investigating Typhoid Fever	February 5, 1904
112	250	Revoking Special Civil Service Rule of July 3, 1902, Pertaining to Persons Formerly Employed in Military Government of Cuba	February 5, 1904
113	251	Allowing Transfer of Matthew J. McCarty to Non-Expected Position of Deputy Surveyor and Inspector at Customs Port of Syracuse, N.Y., Without Examination	February 8, 1904
114	252	Authorizing Certification of Marie L. Baldwin as Clerk in Office of Indian Affairs Without Regard to Civil Service Rules	February 17, 1904
115	253	Amending Civil Service Rules to Except Commissioners of National Military Parks from Examination	February 17, 1904
116	254	Ordering federal Offices in Ohio Closed on February 19, 1904 for Funeral Services of Marcus A. Hanna	February 18, 1904
117	255	Authorizing Appointment of Francis Walker as Special Agent in Bureau of Corporations Without Examination	February 25, 1904
118	256	Designating All Position Except Laborers in Civil Service of War Department in Philippines as Classified Under Civil Service Rules	March 1, 1904
119	257	Authorizing Transfer of Merrit O. Chance to Superintendent in Post Office Department Without Examination	March 4, 1904
120	258	Further Reaffirming the Observance of Proclamation of February 11, 1904 by All Officials of the Government	March 10, 1904
121	259	Amending Civil Service Rules Regarding Physicians in Indian Service	March 26, 1904
122	260	Authorizing Reinstatement of Katherine C. Masterson in Government Printing Office Without Regard to Civil Service Rules	May 18, 1904
123	261	Authorizing Appointment of I. B. Conklin as Clerk in Washington Navy Yard Without Examination	May 26, 1904
124	262	Amending Civil Service Rules Regarding Promotion to Former Positions	June 13, 1904
125	263	Authorizing Appointment of Samuel D. Amen as Internal Revenue Agent Without Regard to Civil Service Rules	June 17, 1904
126	264	Authorizing Appointment of Dr. William L. Ralph as Curator in National Museum Without Examination	June 23, 1904
127	265	Authorizing Appointment of Clarence Reeder as Secretary to the Director of the Geological Survey Without Examination	June 24, 1904
128	266	Authorizing Permanent Appointment of Edna K. Hoyt as Clerk in Department of State Without Examination	June 29, 1904
129	267	Extending Time Limit for Completion of Work of the Spanish Treaty Claims Commission to March 2, 1905	July 30, 1904
130	268	Authorizing Appointment of James E. S. Kinsella as Minor Under Instruction in Navy Yard Without Regard to Navy Yard Order No. 13	August 6, 1904
131	269	Authorizing Promotion of Ludwick C. Young to Clerk in Census Office Without Examination	August 9, 1904
132	270	Authorizing Permanent Appointment of Dr. William Conyngton as Physician at Grand River Indian School After Special Examination	August 19, 1904
133	271	Ordering Mourning Formalities for Death of Henry Clay Payne, Postmaster General	October 5, 1904
134	272	Authorizing Appointment of Luther Conant, Jr., as Special Examiner in Bureau of Corporations Without Examination	November 9, 1904
135	273	Amending Civil Service Rules Regarding Positions Excepted from Examination for Isthmian Canal Commission Personnel	November 15, 1904
136	274	Applying Civil Service Rules to Employees of Isthmian Canal Commission	November 15, 1904
137	275	Regulations Governing the Appointment of Unclassified Laborers in the Departments at Washington, D.C.	November 15, 1904
138	276	Authorizing Permanent Appointment of Clare A. Cooper as Matron in Immigration Service Without Examination	November 21, 1904
139	277	Amending Civil Service Rules to Make Treasury Department Cashiers and Deputies Subject to Examination	November 23, 1904
140	278	Designating Substitute Watchmen in Government Printing Office as Classified Under Civil Service Rules	November 29, 1904
141	279	Prohibiting Appointment in Executive Departments for Any Service of Character Performed by Classified Employees Except Under Civil Service Rules	November 29, 1904
142	280	Authorizing Appointment of James Rankin Young as Superintendent of Dead Letter Office Without Examination	November 30, 1904
143	281	Authorizing Permanent Appointment of Marcus Braun as Inspector in Immigration Service Without Examination	November 30, 1904
144	282	Authorizing Permanent Appointment of Joseph Watkinson as Assistant Inspector in Steamboat Inspection Service Without Examination	November 30, 1904
145	283	Waving Civil Service Requirements of United States Citizenship for Positions on Isthmus of Panama	December 8, 1904
146	284	Authorizing Permanent Appointment of Mrs. William H. Tabberah as Keeper of the Cumberland Head Light Station, New York, Without Examination	December 12, 1904
147	285	Regulations to Govern the Employment of Unskilled Laborers in the Federal Offices Outside of Washington, D. C.	December 12, 1904
148	286	Classifying Employees of General Land Office of the Interior Department Involved in Protection of Forestry Reserves	December 17, 1904
149	287	Amending Civil Service Rules to Except from Examination a Consulting Architect in the War Department for Work on the United States Military Academy	December 24, 1904
150	288	Authorizing Permanent Appointment for Thirteen Clerks in the Bureau of the Census	December 24, 1904
151	288½	Forbidding Notaries Public in Government Service to Charge Fees for Notarial Acts	December 31, 1904

=== 1905 ===
Relative No.	Absolute No.	Title/Description	Date signed
152	289	Amending Civil Service Rules to Add Further Excepted Positions on Isthmus of Panama	January 5, 1905
153	290	Classification of Certain Laborers Employed in the City of Washington, District of Columbia	January 12, 1905
154	291	Amending Civil Service Rules Regarding Exceptions from Examination for Customs Service Positions in Alaska	January 24, 1905
155	292	Extending Time Limit for Completion of Work of the Spanish Treaty Claims Commission to September 2, 1905	January 31, 1905
156	293	Authorizing Transfer of Stephen W. Fuller to Messenger in Department of Commerce and Labor Without Regard to Civil Service Rules	February 6, 1905
157	294	Waiving Citizenship Requirements for Applicants for Examination for Officers of Ships of the Coast and Geodetic Survey on Duty in the Philippines	February 15, 1905
158	295	Authorizing Reinstatement of George F. Otis as Clerk in Quartermaster's Department Without Regard to Civil Service Rules	February 15, 1905
159	296	Ordering Formation of a Commission to Investigate the Naturalization of Aliens Under Existing Laws and to Report its Findings No Later than November 15, 1905	March 1, 1905
160	296-A	Creating Stump Lake Reservation, North Dakota, as Preserve and Breeding Ground for Birds	March 9, 1905
161	297	Authorizing Reinstatement of John Nolan as Carrier in Postal Service Without Regard to Civil Service Rules	March 2, 1905
162	298	Amending Civil Service Rules to Make Certain Interior Department Positions Subject to Examination	March 3, 1905
163	299	Amending Civil Service Rules to Except Five Special Agents in Interior Department from Examination	March 3, 1905
164	300	Amending Civil Service Rules to Except Physicians in Indian Service from Examination	March 3, 1905
165	301	Amending Civil Service Rules to Allow Appointment of Retired Army Officers as Superintendents at Indian Schools Without Examination	March 3, 1905
166	302	Authorizing Appointment of Donald G. Mitchell as Supervisor in Interior Department Without Examination	March 10, 1905
167	302A	Enlarging Lands Set Apart and Reserved for Navajo Indian Reservation, Utah	March 10, 1905
168	303	Authorizing Reinstatement of Catharine M. Gallagher to Classified Service Without Regard to Civil Service Rules	March 10, 1905
169	304	Amending Civil Service Rules to Prohibit Salary Increase of Classified Laborers Without Examination	March 11, 1905
170	305	Authorizing Appointment of Dr. Cyrus Adler as Assistant Secretary in Smithsonian Institution Without Examination	March 14, 1905
171	306	Creating Consultative Board of Architects for Public Buildings in District of Columbia	March 14, 1905
172	307	Authorizing Appointment of Sydnie Kennedy as Chief of Division in Isthmian Canal Service Without Examination	March 15, 1905
173	308	Authorizing Appointment of W. G. Tucker as Clerk in Isthmian Canal Service Without Examination	March 15, 1905
174	309	Authorizing Appointment of Mrs. M. G. Lauxmann as Writer in Coast and Geodetic Survey Without Examination	March 18, 1905
175	310	Compensation of Consultative Board of Architects Prescribed	March 18, 1905
176	310-A	Blank Number in the Official File of Numbered Orders	
177	310-B	Land Office at Oregon City Transferred to Portland	March 21, 1905
178	310-C	Approved War Sec'y recommendation that certain Minnesota lands be reserved for flowage purposes	March 22, 1905
179	310-D	Certain Lands in Lakeview Land District, Oregon, Transferred to Burns Land District	March 29, 1905
180	311	Revoked Executive Order 310	March 27, 1905
181	312	Authorizing Appointment of George W. Pitts as Messenger in Post Office Department Without Regard to Civil Service Rules	March 28, 1905
182	313	Amending Civil Service Rules to Make Post Office Department Cashiers and Finance Clerks Subject to Examination	March 30, 1905
183	313-A	Revoked Unnumbered Order of February 9, 1905, which Transferred Office of the Commissioner of Railroads to Dept of Commerce and Labor	March 31, 1905
184	314	Classifying Certain Laborers Previously Assigned to Classified Work and Forbidding Further Such Assignments	March 30, 1905
185	315	Designating Five Substitute Watchmen in Government Printing Office as Classified under Civil Service Rules	March 30, 1905
186	316	Civil Service Rules Amended to Except Certain Interior Department Positions from Examination	March 30, 1905
187	317	Authorizing Reinstatement of S. F. Scott, Jr., in Post Office Department Without Regard to Civil Service Rules	March 30, 1905
188	317-A	Reorganization of the Isthmian Canal Commission	April 1, 1905
189	318	Amending Civil Service Rules to Make Certain Bureau of Immigration Positions Subject to Examination	March 31, 1905
190	319	Amending Executive Order of December 31, 1904, Relating to Restrictions on Notarial Fees, to Exclude Oaths of Disinterestedness	March 31, 1905
191	320	Amending Civil Service Rules to Except Certain Firemen of War Department from Examination	April 26, 1905
192	320-A	Amending Executive Order of August 13, 1902, to Authorize Navy Department to Discharge Men of Messmen Branch who Enlist for Summer Practice Cruises	April 26, 1905
193	321	Authorizing Transfer of Edward H. Hareford to Forest Assistant in Department of Agriculture Without Regard to Civil Service Rules	May 1, 1905
194	321-A	Abolishing of Ironton Land District, Mo.; Transferred to Springfield Land District	May 1, 1905
195	321-B	Approving War Secretary Recommendation to Reserve Certain Lands Around Subic Bay, Luzon, Philippine Islands for Military Purposes	May 1, 1905
196	321-C	Abolishing of Marysville Land District and Transferring to Sacramento Land District	May 1, 1905
197	321-D	Abolishing of Boonville Land District and Transferring to Springfield Land District	May 1, 1905
198	321-E	Establishment of Uintah Land District	May 1, 1905
199	321-F	Abolishing of Akron Land District, Colo., Transferred to Sterling Land District	May 6, 1905
200	322	Amending Civil Service Rules to Except Certain Law Officers in Bureau of Insular Affairs from Examination	May 12, 1905
201	323	Authorizing Appointment of Carriage Driver for Treasury Secretary Without Examination	May 12, 1905
202	323-A	Placing Administration of Navigation Aids Under Department of Commerce and Labor	May 13, 1905
203	324	Authorizing Appointment of John Ball Osborne as Chief of Bureau of Trade Relations in State Department Without Regard to Civil Service Rules	May 15, 1905
204	324-A	Cancellation of Executive Order 302-A of March 10, 1905, and Reserving Additional Lands in Lieu Of	May 15, 1905
205	324-B	Executive Order 310-C Amended Eliminate Lands Comprising Homestead Entry of Louis Zeph	May 17, 1905
206	324-C	Approving War Secretary Recommendation to Reserve Seven Tracts of Land in Philippine Islands for Military Purposes	May 17, 1905
207	324-D	Approving War Secretary Recommendation to Reserve Nine Additional Tracts of Land in Jolo, Philippine Islands for Military Purposes	May 17, 1905
208	324-E	Approving War Secretary Recommendation of May 15, 1905, to Amend Executive Order of June 30, 1904, Changing Borders of Military Reservation at Zamboanga, Mindanao, Philippine Islands	May 17, 1905
209	325	Authorizing Transfer of Chauncey O. Howard in Bureau of Pensions from Excepted to Non-Excepted Position Without Regard to Civil Service Rules	May 18, 1905
210	325-A	Ordering A Stipulation Be Placed In All Government Contracts Forbidding the Use of Convict Labor	May 18, 1905
211	326	Authorizing Appointment of Certain Positions in the Washington, D. C. Filtration Plant Without Regard to Civil Service Rules	May 18, 1905
212	327	Authorizing Reinstatement of Eleanor Relyea Without Regard to Civil Service Rules	May 20, 1905
213	328	Authorizing Appointment of William J. Humphreys as Professor of Meteorological Physics in Weather Bureau Without Examination	May 22, 1905
214	328-A	Boundaries of Uintah Land District, Utah, Modified; in Form of Proclamation	May 23, 1905
215	328-B	Approving Acting War Secretary Recommendation of May 24, 1905 to Reserve 13 Tracts of Described Lands in Alaska for Use by the Signal Corps. United States Army	May 24, 1905
216	328-C	Prescribing Compensation for Enlisted Men of the Navy Detailed as Ship's Tailors	June 2, 1905
217	329	Authorizing Appointment of Albert C. Muhse as Special Agent in Bureau of Corporations Without Examination	June 3, 1905
218	330	Authorizing Appointment of Five Employees in Isthmian Canal Service Without Regard to Civil Service Rules	June 8, 1905
219	330-A	Approval of War Secretary Recommendation to Reserve Grass Island, Gray's Harbor, Washington, for Military Purposes	June 12, 1905
220	330-B	Amendment of Executive Order of March 26, 1901, Establishing Limits of Punishment for Enlisted Men of the Army	June 12, 1905
221	331	Authorizing Appointment of C. H. Chapman as Copyist in General Land Office Without Regard to Civil Service Rules	June 13, 1905
222	332	Amending Civil Service Rules to Allow Promotions to Superintendent in Indian Service Without Examination	June 13, 1905
223	333	Waiving Civil Service Rules and Navy Yard Regulations for Laborers at Naval Hospitals	June 13, 1905
224	334	Amending Civil Service Rules to Except Certain Construction Workers from Examination	June 13, 1905
225	335	Authorizing Appointment of Mary T. Waggaman as Clerk in Bureau of Labor Without Regard to Civil Service Rules	June 24, 1905
226	335-A	Designating Board of Consulting Engineers to Consider Plans for Canal Across Isthmus of Panama	June 24, 1905
227	336	Authorizing Permanent Appointment of James W. Plake as Copyist in Office of Indian Affairs Without Regard to Civil Service Rules	June 30, 1905
228	337	Authorizing Appointment of Charles W. Bell as Finance Clerk in Post-Office Department Without Regard to Civil Service Rules	July 3, 1905
229	337-A	Placing Administration of Navigation Aids for Tutuila and Other Samoan Islands Under Control of the Department of Commerce and Labor	July 3, 1905
230	337-B	Approving Acting War Secretary Recommendation of June 30, 1905 to Reserve Lands in Seward Alaska for Military Telegraph Purposes	July 3, 1905
231	337-C	Forbidding the Employment of Outside Influence for All Appointments, Transfers, Promotions Etc. of Officers of the Army and Navy	July 7, 1905
232	338	Authorizing Permanent Appointment of Abram B. Frisbie as Watchman in Interior Department Without Examination	July 10, 1905
233	339	Amending Regulations Governing the Employment of Unskilled Laborers in Federal Offices Outside Washington, D.C.	July 12, 1905
234	340	Authorizing Reinstatement of Frank B. McCown as Clerk in Quartermaster's Department Without Regard to Civil Service Rules	July 13, 1905
235	341	Authorizing Employment of Allen Hazen as Engineer in Washington Filtration Plant for Seven Additional Months	July 13, 1905
236	341-A	Approving Acting War Secretary Recommendation to Remove 28 Acres from Fort Bayard Military Reservation, New Mexico, Erroneously Included in Private Patent	July 15, 1905
237	341-B	Extending Time and Compensation for James L. Bristow, Special Panama Railroad Commissioner, to Complete Report	July 15, 1905
238	341-C	Modifying Boundaries of Fort Gibbon Military Reservation, Alaska	July 19, 1905
239	341-D	Tucson, Arizona, Office of Gila Land District Transferred to Phoenix	July 19, 1905
240	342	Authorizing Appointment of Henry Summers as Clerk in New York Pension Agency Without Examination	July 20, 1905
241	342-A	Land Office at Prescott Arizona, Arizona Land District, Abolished; Transferred to Phoenix	July 20, 1904
242	342-B	Approval of Acting Interior Sec'y's Recommendation of July 18 that Certain Utah Lands Be Added to Uintah Indian Reservation Despite Prior Application for State of Utah for Water Rights from Rock Creek	July 21, 1905
243	343	Authorizing Permanent Appointment of Gertrude Weaver as Clerk in Signal Service Without Examination	July 21, 1905
244	343-A	Approval of Acting Interior Sec'y's Recommendation of July 20 That Additional Lands Within the Uintah Indian Reservation, Utah, to Protect Water Rights of the Indians	July 21, 1905
245	343-B	Approval of Acting War Secretary's Recommendation of July 21, 1905 Concerning Disposition of Fort Shaw Indian School Reservation, Montana	July 22, 1905
246	343-C	Reserving Certain Described Lands on Revillagigedo Island, Alaska for Use as a Site for a Lighthouse Depot	July 26, 1905
247	344	Authorizing Employment of Charles W. Spicer in Bureau of the Census Without Examination	July 27, 1905
248	344-A	Approving Acting War Secretary Recommendation of July 28, 1905, to Declare Conveyed Portion of Port Madison Indian Reservation as a Military Reservation	July 29, 1905
249	344-B	Reserving Certain Described Lands for the Pueblo Indians of New Mexico Belonging to the Pueblo of Santa Clara	July 29, 1905
250	344-C	Ashland and Eau Claire Land Districts, Wis., Abolished; Transferred to Wausau Land District	July 31, 1905
251	345	Extending Time Limit for Completion of Work of the Spanish Treaty Claims Commission to March 2, 1906	August 3, 1905
252	346	Authorizing Permanent Appointment of Ferdinand Schwarz as an Unclassified Laborer in Government Printing Office	August 3, 1905
253	347	Amending Civil Service Rules to Except Private Secretary to Purchasing Agent of Post Office Department from Examination	August 16, 1905
254	347-A	Revoking Executive Order of December 9, 1852 Pertaining to Certain Described Lands in Michigan Reserved for Lighthouse Purposes	August 19, 1905
255	347-B	Santa Barbara Island, Calif., Reserved for Lighthouse Purposes	August 25, 1905
256	348	Authorizing Appointment of May R. Proctor for a Position in Government Printing Office Without Examination	August 25, 1905
257	348-A	Reserving Parcels of Reclaimed Harbor Land, Manila, Philippine Islands, for Military Purposes	August 29, 1905
258	348-B	Excusing Washington Navy Yard Employees From Work on Labor Day, September 4, 1905	August 31, 1905
259	348-C	Prescribing Compensation for Members of Advisory Board of Engineers for the Panama Canal	August 31, 1905
260	349	Authorizing Appointment of Thomas Harper as a Clerk in the Quartermaster's Department at Large Without Examination	July 31, 1905
261	350	Authorizing Appointment of Philip Cowen as Inspector in the Immigration Service Without Examination	September 5, 1905
262	351	Prescribing Procedure for Removal of Officers and Employees Serving on the Isthmus of Panama	September 8, 1905
263	351-A	Reserving Certain Described Lands on Gravina and False Islands, Alaska for Light-house Purposes	September 16, 1905
264	351-B	Altering Military Reservation at Fort San Pedro, Iloilo, Panay, Philippine Islands	September 18, 1905
265	352	Authorizing Appointment of John B. Goff and D. P. Wells as Assistant Forest Rangers in Forest Service Without Examination	September 19, 1905
266	352-A	Prescribing Regulations for Presentation of the Congressional Medal of Honor	September 20, 1905
267	352-B	Approving Acting War Secretary Recommendation of September 18, 1905, to Reserve Lands at Safety Harbor and Old Woman, Alaska, for Military Telegraph Purposes	September 21, 1905
268	353	Authorizing Reinstatement of Mary E. Enright in Bureau of Engraving and Printing Without Regard to Civil Service Rules	September 22, 1905
269	354	Authorizing Transfer of W. E. Hall to Clerk in Treasury Department Without Regard to Civil Service Rules	September 26, 1905
270	355	Authorizing Appointment of Miss Marjorie H. Young as Clerk in the United States Pension Agency Without Examination Under Civil-Service Rules	October 6, 1905
271	356	Authorizing Appointment of Mrs. M. C. Miller to a Clerkship in the Classified Service Without Examination Under Civil-Service Rules	October 7, 1905
272	357	Amending Civil Service Rules to Except Private Secretary to Director of the Geological Survey from Examination	October 10, 1905
273	357-A	Abolishing Western Land District, Office at Kingfisher, Oklahoma, and Transferring the Lands, Business, and Archives to Eastern Land District, Office at Guthrie, Oklahoma in Consolidation	October 10, 1905
274	357-B	Establishing Passage Key Reservation as a Preserve and Breeding Ground for Native Birds	October 10, 1905
275	357-C	Establishing Siskiwit Islands Reservation as a Preserve and Breeding Ground for Native Birds	October 10, 1905
276	357-D	Establishing Huron Islands Reservation as a Preserve and Breeding Ground for Native Birds	October 10, 1905
277	358	Authorizing Reinstatement of Dessie M. Bowers to Classified Service Without Regard to Civil Service Rules	October 11, 1905
278	359	Forbidding Government Officers and Employees to Assist in Preparation for Civil Service Examinations	October 13, 1905
279	360	Authorizing Permanent Appointment of Dollie A. Slayton as Clerk in Bureau of the Census Without Regard to Civil Service Rules	October 16, 1905
280	361	Authorizing Reinstatement of Julia P. Madeira as Bureau of the Census Without Regard to Civil Service Rules	October 16, 1905
281	362	Authorizing Removal of Government Employees for Inefficiency or Incapability Without Trial	October 17, 1905
282	363	Authorizing Appointment of Charles Denby as Chief Clerk of the State Department Without Examination	October 24, 1905
283	364	Amending Civil Service Rules to Except Certain Temporary Workers in Bureau of Fisheries from Examination	October 31, 1905
284	365	Examinations for Clerical Positions in the Office of the Recorder Of Deeds	October 31, 1905
285	365-A	Grand Fork Land District, ND, Abolished; Transferred to Devils Lake Land District	October 31, 1905
286	365-B	Diminishment of Black Hills Forest Reserve, South Dakota - Form of Proclamation	October 31, 1905
287	366	Authorizing Appointment of Edward McCauley as Chief of Redemption Division in Post Office Department Without Examination	November 1, 1905
288	366-A	Reserving Certain Described Lands in California in Connection With Point Sal Lighthouse Reservation	November 3, 1905
289	366-B	Authorizing Additional Compensation for Enlisted Men of the Navy Serving With Submarine Torpedo Boats	November 8, 1905
290	367	Requiring Examination for Certain Consular Officers in All Consulates General, Consulates, Commercial Agencies, and Consular Agencies	November 10, 1905
291	368	Appointment of Secretaries of Embassy and Legation	November 10, 1905
292	369	Applying Civil Service Rules or Regulations Regarding Employment of Laborers to Workers at Indian Warehouses	November 11, 1905
293	369-A	Establishing Breton Island Reservation as a Preserve and Breeding Ground for Native Birds	November 11, 1905
294	369-B	Approving Acting War Secretary Recommendation of November 13, 1905, to Reserve Lands Near Zamboanga, Mindanao, Philippine Islands, for Target Range	November 14, 1905
295	370	Appointments in the Isthmian Canal Service Without Examination in the Absence of Suitably Qualified Eligibles	November 15, 1905
296	371	Amending Civil Service Rule XII, Pertaining to Removal	November 17, 1905
297	372	Amending Civil Service Rules Regarding Positions Excepted from Examination	November 18, 1905
298	372-A	Bent Land District, Colo., Abolished; Transferred to Valley Land District, Office at Pueblo	November 18, 1905
299	372-B	Approved Acting Sec'y of War Recommendation of Nov. 20 to Diminish and Transfer Lands of St. Michael Military Reservation to Interior Dept.	November 20, 1905
300	373	Authorizing Appointment of S. H. Alexander as Clerk in Post Office Department Without Regard to Civil Service Rules	November 23, 1905
301	373-A	Amending Executive Order of August 31, 1905, Regarding Compensation for Members of Advisory Board of Engineers for the Panama Canal	November 25, 1905
302	374	Authorizing Appointment of Marie L. Eastwood in Bureau of the Census Without Regard to Civil Service Rules	November 27, 1905
303	375	Amending Civil Service Rules to Except Cooks from Examination	November 27, 1905
304	375-A	Certain Lands in California Reserved for Lighthouse Purposes (Revoked in Part by EO 5750)	November 27, 1905
305	375-B	Approving War Secretary Recommendation of November 25, 1905, to Reserve Lands at Chilkat Inlet, Alaska, for Water Supply to Fort William H. Seward	November 27, 1905
306	376	Authorizing Appointment of Edna M. Peltz as Clerk in Pension Office Without Examination	December 6, 1905
307	376-A	Sidney Land District, Neb., Abolished; Transferred to Western Land District, Office at North Platte	December 6, 1905
308	377	Authorizing Reappointment of Emily L. Genella in Bureau of Engraving and Printing Without Regard to Civil Service Rules	December 9, 1905
309	377½	Appointing Committee to Plan Inquiry of Government Office Sanitary Conditions for Prevention of Tuberculosis	December 7, 1905
310	377-A	Approving War Secretary Recommendation of December 6, 1905, to Reserve Lands at Keystone, Alaska, for Military Telegraph Purposes	December 7, 1905
311	377-B	Authorizing Isthmian Canal Commission to Hold Quarterly Session of January 1, 1906, in Washington, D. C.	December 7, 1905
312	378	Amending Civil Service Rules to Make Treasury Department Assistant Assayer Subject to Examination	December 7, 1905
313	379	Authorizing Appointment of Howard H. Belden Upon Passing Noncompetitive Examination	December 11, 1905
314	380	Authorizing Appointment of Mary E. Owings to Position in Government Printing Office Without Examination	December 11, 1905
315	381	Classifying Thirteen Special Agents in the Bureau of the Census	December 14, 1905
316	382	Authorizing Transfer of Katherine S. Todd to Clerk in Office of Commissioner of Internal Revenue Without Regard to Civil Service Rules	December 14, 1905
317	383	Amending Civil Service Rules to Except Certain Temporary Positions in Agriculture Department from Examination	December 18, 1905
318	384	Authorizing Permanent Appointment of Anna F. McCormick as Clerk in Isthmian Canal Commission Without Regard to Civil Service Rules	December 18, 1905
319	385	Authorizing Reinstatement of Richard H. Williams as Inspector of Hulls of Steam Vessels Without Regard to Civil Service Rules	December 18, 1905
320	386	Authorizing Appointment of Nevil Monroe Hopkins as Electrical Engineer in Navy Department After Noncompetitive Examination	December 19, 1905
321	387	Amending Civil Service Rules Regarding Positions Excepted from Apportionment	December 19, 1905
322	388	Authorizing Reinstatement of Hattie R. McMullin to Position in Interior Department After Without Regard to Civil Service Rules	December 23, 1905
323	389	Authorizing Reinstatement of Mrs. Mary E. Griffin in the Bureau of Engraving and Printing Without Regard to Civil-Service Rules	December 23, 1905

=== 1906 ===
Relative No.	Absolute No.	Title/Description	Date signed
324	389-A	Stockton Land District, Calif., Abolished; Transferred to Sacramento Land District	January 3, 1906
325	389½	Creating the Jamestown Tercentennial Commission and Appointing Members Thereto	January 5, 1906
326	390	Amending Civil Service Rules to Except from Examination Stitch Counters in the New York Customs District	January 6, 1906
327	391	Authorizing Permanent Appointment of Ralph Whitman as Draftsman in Isthmian Canal Commission Without Regard to Civil Service Rules	January 9, 1906
328	392	Authorizing Appointment of E. M. LeBoiteaux in Bureau of the Census After Noncompetitive Examination	January 10, 1906
329	393	Repealing Executive Order No. 370 of November 15, 1905, Regarding Appointments to Isthmian Canal Commission Positions	January 12, 1906
330	394	Amending Civil Service Rules Regarding Positions Excepted from Examination for Isthmian Canal Commission Personnel	January 12, 1906
331	394-A	Reserving Certain Lands in Minnesota for Reservoir System at Mississippi River Headwaters	January 13, 1906
332	395	Authorizing Appointment of Walter R. Brinckerhoff as Chief of Leprosy Hospital Station in Hawaii Subject to Noncompetitive Examination	January 16, 1906
333	395-A	Reserving Lands at Diamond Head, Kupikipikio Point, and Punchbowl Hill, Hawaii, for Military Purposes	January 18, 1906
334	396	Authorizing Reinstatement of Jeannette L. Cavanagh as Classified Laborer in Department of Agriculture Without Regard to Civil Service Rules	January 22, 1906
335	397	Directing Department Heads to Appoint a Committee to Oversee the Printing Requirements and Publications for Each Respective Department	January 20, 1906
336	398	Authorizing Reappointment of William A. Barr in Post Office Department Without Regard to Civil Service Rules	January 22, 1906
337	399	Prescribing Additional Responsibilities for the United States Board on Geographic Names	January 23, 1906
338	400	Temporary appointment of Mrs. Charles (Florence E.) Broady	January 1906
339	401	Appointment of Mr. Howard H. Belden	January 1906
340	402	Amendment to Executive Order No. 163 of January 31, 1902 to Include Independent Government Agencies	January 25, 1906
341	403	Amending Civil Service Rules to Except Mounted Inspectors in the Customs Service from Examination	January 25, 1906
342	404	Authorizing Appointment of Charles S. Brown as Inspector in Government Printing Office Subject to Noncompetitive Examination	January 26, 1906
343	404-A	Transferring Certain Lands From Bismarck Land District, N. Dakota to Fargo Land District	January 31, 1906
344	404-B	Amending Executive Order of May 21, 1887 to Modify Boundaries of Fort Washakie Military Reservation, Wyoming	January 31, 1906
345	405	Authorizing Reinstatement of Mary H. Donnelly as Clerk in Office of Chief of Ordnance Without Regard to Civil Service Rules	January 25, 1906
346	405-A	Abolishing Malagi (Malahi) Island Military Reservation, Laguna de Bay, Luzon, Philippine Islands	February 1, 1906
347	405-B	Reserving Lands and Waters Around Yes Lake, Yes Bay, and Back Bay, Alaska, for Salmon Hatchery	February 1, 1906
348	406	Authorizing Appointment of Charles H. Ingram as Clerk in War Department Without Examination	February 3, 1906
349	407	Extending Time Limit for Completion of Work of the Spanish Treaty Claims Commission to September 2, 1906	February 5, 1906
350	407-A	Reserving Certain Described Lands in Randlett, Utah, for the Protestant Episcopal Church, for Use and Benefit of Ute Indians	February 5, 1906
351	408	Authorizing Reinstatement of Clayton G. Coleman as Special Agent in General Land Office Without Regard to Civil Service Rules	February 9, 1906
352	409	Establishing Indian Key Reservation, Tampa Bay, Florida as Preserve and Breeding Ground for Birds	February 10, 1906
353	410	Authorizing Appointment of William M. Geddes as Clerk in Treasury Department Without Regard to Civil Service Rules	February 13, 1906
354	411	Authorizing Promotion of Joseph Fought to Clerk in Treasury Department Without Regard to Civil Service Rules	February 13, 1906
355	411½	Authorizing Appointment of John H. Smith as Laborer in Bureau of Engraving and Printing Without Regard to Laborer Regulations	February 17, 1906
356	412	Clarifying Executive Order No. 348-C of August 31, 1905, Regarding Compensation for Advisory Board of Engineers for the Panama Canal	February 19, 1906
357	413	Boundaries of Bismarck and Fargo Land Districts, N. Dak., Redefined; Certain Lands, With Archives, Records, and Business Pertaining Thereto	February 19, 1906
358	414	Mangum Land District, Okla., Abolished and Lands, Business, and Archives Transferred to the Lawton Land District	February 22, 1906
359	415	Authorizing Appointment of Nine Special Agents in Treasury Department Without Regard to Civil Service Rules	February 24, 1906
360	416	Prescribing Procedure for Appointment of Laborers Performing Work of Classified Nature	February 24, 1906
361	417	Reserving Lands in Unalaklik, Alaska for Use of Army Signal Corps to Operate Military Cable and Telegraph Lines	February 24, 1906
362	418	Fixing the Compensation for Members of the Isthmian Canal Commission	February 26, 1906
363	419	Authorizing Appointment of Katherine Moynihan in Post Office Department Without Examination	February 27, 1906
364	420	Authorizing Reinstatement of James T. Peterson and Clarence W. Allen in Post Office Department Without Regard to Civil Service Rules	February 27, 1906
365	421	Prescribing Rules for the Prevention of Tuberculosis Among Employees in Public Service	February 28, 1906
366	422	Amending Consular Regulations, Paragraph 678, Pertaining to Invoices for Exports to the United States	March 1, 1906
367	423	Amending Consular Regulations, Paragraph 680, Pertaining to Verification of Invoices	March 1, 1906
368	424	Authorizing Appointment of Robert Lee Gray as Assistant Messenger in Department of Justice Without Examination	March 1, 1906
369	425	Authorizing Reinstatement of Coila B. Ashby as Clerk in Interior Department Without Regard to Civil Service Rules	March 1, 1906
370	426	Modifying Boundaries of Fort Egbert Military Reservation, Alaska	March 3, 1906
371	427	Admission of J. F. Moreno to Examination for Classified Position Without Regard to Civil Service Rules	March 9, 1906
372	428	Reserving Lands on Batan and Cacraray Islands, Philippine Islands, for Military Purposes	March 10, 1906
373	429	Reserving Certain Described Lands in Alaska for Experimental Agricultural Station	March 22, 1906
374	430	Defining Intention of Order Fixing Salaries and Allowances of Isthmian Canal Commissioners	March 26, 1906
375	431	Reserving Middle Islands at Rock Harbor, Michigan, for Lighthouse Purposes	March 27, 1906
376	432	Abolishing Grass Island Military Reservation, Grays Harbor, Washington	March 28, 1906
377	433	Boundaries of Billings Land District, Montana, Redefined	March 28, 1906
378	434	Authorizing Appointment of Pyeng E. Yoon as Clerk in Post Office at Honolulu Without Regard to Civil Service Rules	March 28, 1906
379	435	Authorizing Appointment of Charles P. Galpin as Classified Laborer in Bureau of Pensions Without Examination	March 31, 1906
380	436	Authorizing Reinstatement of Joseph F. Laporte to Post Office Service Without Regard to Civil Service Rules	April 4, 1906
381	437	Authorizing Employment of Jacob S. McClure in Classified Service	April 5, 1906
382	438	Authorizing Reinstatement of Benjamin B. Cox to Post Office Service Without Regard to Civil Service Rules	April 9, 1906
383	439	Reserving Lands in Mississippi as Target Range for Revenue Cutter Service	April 12, 1906
384	440	Authorizing Transfer of Harry H. Brewster to Finance Clerk in Post Office Service Without Regard to Civil Service Rules	April 14, 1906
385	441	Authorizing Appointment of Mary A. McDonald as Clerk in Department of the Interior Without Examination	April 23, 1906
386	442	Abolishing the Office of Surveyor General for Florida	April 27, 1906
387	443	Land Office At San Francisco, Calif., Ordered Temporarily Removed to Oakland, the Building in Which It Was Housed Having Been Destroyed	April 28, 1906
388	444	Authorizing Permanent Appointment of George M. Shafer as Watchman in Department of the Interior Without Regard to Civil Service Rules	May 1, 1906
389	445	Reserving Certain Described Lands in Juneau, Alaska, for Educational Purposes	May 10, 1906
390	446	Revoking Executive Order No. 372-A of November 18, 1905, Abolishing Bent Land District, Colorado, with Office at Lamar	May 16, 1906
391	447	Maj. Gen. F.C. Ainsworth, Military Sec'y, and Brig. Gen. J. Franklin Bell Designated to Act, In the Order Named, as War Sec'y During the Absence	May 18, 1906
392	448	Authorizing Appointment of Harry E. Burns as Fireman Without Regard to Civil Service Rules	May 21, 1906
393	449	Transferring Certain Specified Archives of the Department of State to the Library of Congress	May 23, 1906
394	450	Authorizing Appointment of O. Louis Cleven to Bureau of the Census After Noncompetitive Examination	May 24, 1906
395	451	Authorizing Reinstatement of Mrs. M. C. Kratz to Treasury Department Without Regard to Civil Service Rules	May 29, 1906
396	452	Authorizing Appointment of Clerks on Isthmus of Panama Earning Less than $75 Monthly Without Examination	May 31, 1906
397	453	Authorizing Reinstatement of Jesse F. Gates as Classified Laborer in Treasury Department Without Regard to Civil Service Rules	June 6, 1906
398	454	Transferring Certain Described Lands in Oklahoma Known as the “Government Acre” from the Interior Dept. to the Treasury Dept. for Post Office and Other Government Purposes	June 6, 1906
399	455	Reserving Certain Described Lands Within the Salt Lake Forest Reserve, Utah, for Use as a Nursery Site	June 6, 1906
400	456	Modifying Fort. St. Michael Military Reservation, Alaska	June 8, 1906
401	457	Officer in Charge of Public Buildings and Grounds Authorized to Employ A Copyist For Up to Three Months in Connection With the Inventory	June 13, 1906
402	458	Authorizing Civil Service Commission to Certify Non-Citizens for Appointment Under Certain Prescribed Conditions	June 13, 1906
403	459	Amending Executive Order No. 442 of April 27, 1906, Abolishing the Office of Surveyor General for Florida, to Make the Effective Date of Such Abolition June 30, 1907 Instead of June 30, 1906	June 14, 1906
404	460	Authorizing Transfer of Cressy L. Wilbur to Chief Statistician in Bureau of the Census Without Regard to Civil Service Rules	June 16, 1906
405	461	Amending Civil Service Rules to Remove Six Month Limitation on Temporary Forest Guards	June 16, 1906
406	462	Ordering Four Hour Workdays on Saturdays During Summer for Washington Navy Yard Workers	June 18, 1906
407	463	Reserving Certain Land Within the Belle Fourche Irrigation Project, S. Dak., for Agricultural Experimental Work	June 19, 1906
408	464	Amending Civil Service Rules to Make Certain Positions in Fifth Internal Revenue District of North Carolina Subject to Examination	June 21, 1906
409	465	All Unappropriated Public Lands in Wisconsin North of Township 33, Withdrawn from Entry, Settlement or Other Appropriation for 90 Days	June 22, 1906
410	466	Ordering Four Hour Workdays on Saturdays During Summer for Government Printing Office Workers	June 23, 1906
411	467	Authorizing Transfer of Everett J. Dallas to Competitive Position in Interior Department Without Regard to Civil Service Rules	June 23, 1906
412	467-A	Col. O. H. Ernst Ordered to Continue as Member of International Water Ways Commission	June 23, 1906
413	468	Ordering Four Hour Workdays on Saturdays During Summer for Navy Yard and Naval Station Workers	June 25, 1906
414	469	Regulations Governing Consular Appointments and Promotions	June 27, 1906
415	470	Ordering Four Hour Workdays on Saturdays During Summer for War Department and Army Headquarters Workers	June 29, 1906
416	471	Authorizing Temporary Appointment of Pension Examiner Without Regard to Civil Service Rules	June 29, 1906
417	472	Authorizing Reinstatement of Emma King to Bureau of Engraving and Printing Without Regard to Civil Service Rules	June 29, 1906
418	472½	Authorizing Appointment of James K. Dawes as Clerk in Post Office at Philadelphia Without Regard to Civil Service Rules	June 29, 1906
419	473	Authorizing Transfer of Charles N. Twadell to Competitive Position in Bureau of Pensions Without Regard to Civil Service Rules	June 30, 1906
420	474	Fixing Compensation for Members of the Isthmian Canal Commission	June 30, 1906
421	475	Ordering Preference for Military Veterans for Appointment to Certain Positions in State, War, and Navy Department Building	July 5, 1906
422	476	Authorizing Appointment of Ralph Modjeski as Consulting Engineer in Ordnance Department After Noncompetitive Examination	July 9, 1906
423	477	Modifying Fort Bayard Military Reservation, New Mexico	July 14, 1906
424	478	Authorizing Appointment of William E. DeRiemer as Clerk in Smithsonian Institution Without Regard to Civil Service Rules	July 14, 1906
425	479	Smithsonian Institution Employees Working on International Catalogue of Scientific Literature Classified Under Civil Service Rules	July 14, 1906
426	480	Classifying Certain Laborers in the Bureau of Fisheries	July 17, 1906
427	481	Authorizing Permanent Appointment of Clerks on Isthmus of Panama Earning Less than $75 Monthly Erroneously Appointed under Executive Order No. 394 of January 12, 1906	July 17, 1906
428	482	Authorizing Appointment of Michael J. Holland as Clerk in Marine Corps Headquarters Without Regard to Civil Service Rules	July 20, 1906
429	483	Removing Lands from Malabang Military Reservation, Mindanao, Philippine Islands, for Use by Town of Malabang	July 21, 1906
430	484	Ordering Four Hour Workdays on Saturdays During Summer for Engineer Department at Large Workers of the War Department	July 24, 1906
431	485	Ordering Four Hour Workdays on Saturdays During Summer for Workers at Office of Public Buildings and Grounds	July 24, 1906
432	486	Authorizing Appointment of Elizabeth Stack as Clerk in Pension Office Without Examination	July 26, 1906
433	487	Reserving Certain Described Lands in California, Previously Reserved for Military Purposes, for Naval Purposes	July 28, 1906
434	488	Authorizing Appointment of Tony Verrosso as Unclassified Laborer Without Regard to Laborer Regulations	July 30, 1906
435	489	Authorizing Permanent Appointment of Florence E. Broady in Government Printing Office Without Examination	July 30, 1906
436	490	Portion of El Reno Land District, Oklahoma, Transferred to Lawton Land District	August 2, 1906
437	491	Authorizing Appointment of Julia Lynah McCoy in Treasury Department Without Examination	August 6, 1906
438	492	Extending Time Limit for Completion of Work of the Spanish Treaty Claims Commission to January 1, 1907	August 8, 1906
439	493	Changing Title of Board on Geographic Names to United States Geographic Board, and Adding Duties	August 10, 1906
440	494	Headquarters of Coeur d'Alene Indian Agency Moved to Tekoa	August 13, 1906
441	495	Amending Consular Regulations	August 13, 1906
442	496	Prescribing Tariff of Consular Fees, Effective November 1, 1906	August 13, 1906
443	497	Authorizing Appointment of W. M. Johnson as Clerk in Immigration Service Without Examination	August 14, 1906
444	498	Authorizing Reinstatement of E. J. Mooklar as Clerk in Naval Station at Tutuila, Samoa Without Regard to Civil Service Rules	August 14, 1906
445	499	Authorizing Appointment of Everett Spring in Bureau of the Census Without Examination	August 17, 1906
446	500	Washington Navy Yard Employees Excused from Work on Labor Day, Sept. 3	August 29, 1906
447	501	Authorizing Appointment of Alice A. Masters as Clerk in Bureau of the Census Without Examination	September 7, 1906
448	502	Removing Lands from Fort Robinson Military Reservation, Nebraska	September 14, 1906
449	503	Authorizing Extra Compensation for Enlisted Men in Marine Corps Detailed as Messmen	September 18, 1906
450	504	Requiring Executive Departments to Report Instances of Supervised Contractors Working in Excess of Eight Hours in a Day	September 19, 1906
451	505	Authorizing Transfer of Julius H. Hammond, Clerk in General Land Office, to Competitive Service	September 20, 1906
452	506	Authorizing Isthmian Canal Commission to Hold Next Quarterly Session on November 15, 1906, Instead of October 1, 1906, on the Isthmus of Panama	September 20, 1906
453	507	Authorizing Reinstatement of Joseph Tyssowski in Interior Department Without Regard to Civil Service Rules	September 26, 1906
454	508	Amending Civil Service Rules to Except Private Secretary in Customs Office at Port of New York from Examination	September 29, 1906
455	509	Authorizing Prizes for Excellence in Gunnery Exercises and Target Practice for Men of Marine Corps	October 1, 1906
456	510	Approving Removal of Office of Surveyor General of Alaska from Sitka to Juneau	October 2, 1906
457	511	Excusing United States Spanish War Veterans Federal Employees in Washington from Work for Spanish War Veterans' Parade	October 3, 1906
458	512	Removing Lands from Fort San Pedro Military Reservation, Iloilo, Panay, Philippine Islands, for Lighthouse Purposes	October 3, 1906
459	513	Authorizing Retention of Joe Osscar as Engineer in Leech Lake Indian Agency Without Examination	October 5, 1906
460	514	Excusing Members of the Grand Army of the Republic Employed in Executive Departments at Washington from Duty for Spanish War Veterans' Parade	October 5, 1906
461	515	Including Portion of Fort Grant Military Reservation, Arizona, in Mt. Graham Forest Reserve	October 6, 1906
462	516	Extending Time Limit for Completion of Work of the Spanish Treaty Claims Commission Until March 2, 1907	October 6, 1906
463	517	Prescribing Regulations Governing the Presentation of the Medal of Honor to Navy Enlisted Men and Officers	October 19, 1906
464	518	Administration of Provisional Government of Cuba through the Bureau of Insular Affairs	October 23, 1906
465	519	Reserving Abandoned Portion of New Fort Lyon Military Reservation, Bent County, Colorado, and Buildings Thereon, for the Navy Department for Sanitarium Purposes	October 25, 1906
466	520	Reserving Lands Near Valdez, Alaska, as Target Range for Fort Liscum	October 26, 1906
467	521	Authorizing Promotion of Paul A. Hines Without Examination	October 30, 1906
468	522	Abolishing Marshall Land District, Minnesota, with Office at St. Cloud, and Lands and Business Transferred to Duluth Land District	November 5, 1906
469	523	Authorizing Reinstatement of Albert M. West as Scientific Assistant in Department of Agriculture Without Regard to Civil Service Rules	November 5, 1906
470	524	Amending Civil Service Rules to Make Deputy Collectors in Internal Revenue Service Subject to Examination	November 7, 1906
471	525	Reserving Portion of Cape Hinchinbrook, Hinchinbrook Island, Alaska, for Lighthouse Purposes	November 27, 1906
472	526	Authorizing Appointment of Theodore C. M. Schindler as Special Agent in Bureau of Corporations Without Examination	December 6, 1906
473	527	Amending the Organization and Duties of the Isthmian Canal Commission	November 17, 1906
474	528	Authorizing Appointment of William W. Gillespie as Deputy Collector in Customs Service Without Examination	December 8, 1906
475	529	Reserving Island Known as “Rock of Ages” in Lake Superior, Michigan for Lighthouse Purposes	December 10, 1906
476	530	Amending Consular Service Regulation of June 27, 1906, Governing Appointment and Promotion in the Consular Service	December 12, 1906
477	531	Authorizing Permanent Appointment of Three Watchmen in Department of the Interior Without Regard to Civil Service Rules	December 14, 1906
478	532	Authorizing Transfer of Kate S. Jones to Clerk in Department of the Interior Without Examination	December 14, 1906
479	533	Ordering Pay Increases for Navy Men Serving More than One Enlistment and Instructors of Apprentice Seamen	November 27, 1906
480	534	Prescribing Rules Governing Peacetime Purchase of Discharge from the Navy	November 30, 1906
481	535	Removing Lands from Fort Davis Military Reservation, Texas	December 17, 1906
482	536	Authorizing Reinstatement of Alfred W. Brown in Customs Service Without Regard to Civil Service Rules	December 11, 1906
483	537	Reserving Certain Described Lands in New Mexico for the Use and Benefit of the Indians of the Jemez Pueblo	December 19, 1906
484	538	Amending Tariff of Consular Fees to Exempt Affidavit Fees for Owners of Sealskin Garments Entering from Canada	December 21, 1906
485	539	Authorizing Transfer of William A. Woodruff to Clerk in Treasury Department Without Regard to Civil Service Rules	December 24, 1906
486	540	Authorizing Transfer of W. B. Johnson to Clerk in Department of the Interior Without Examination	December 31, 1906
487	541	Authorizing Transfer of Joseph J. Harvey to Subclerical Position in Civil Service	December 31, 1906
488	542	Authorizing Transfer of Henry G. Balkam to Clerk in Bureau of the Census Without Regard to Civil Service Rules	December 31, 1906

=== 1907 ===
Relative No.	Absolute No.	Title/Description	Date signed
489	543	Revoking the Military Reservation of Camp Hartshorne in the Philippine Islands	January 4, 1907
490	544	Authorizing Promotion of Marshall M. Pool to Clerk in United States Army Office Without Examination	January 12, 1907
491	545	Authorizing Reinstatement of David Robinson as Immigrant Inspector Without Regard to Civil Service Rules	January 12, 1907
492	546	Identical to Executive Order 548	January 15, 1907
493	547	Authorizing Appointment of Elza Eugene Phelps as Customs Inspector Without Regard to Civil Service Rules	January 11, 1907
494	548	Authorizing Issuance of Certificates of Protection by Governor of American Samoa	January 15, 1907
495	549	Prescribing Official Manner of Designating Vessels of the United States Navy	January 8, 1907
496	550	Building in Sitka, Alaska, Formerly Used as Governor's Residence Reserved as Naval Hospital	January 16, 1907
497	551	Addition to the Fort Lincoln Military Reservation, Burleigh County, North Dakota	January 17, 1907
498	552	Regulations for Army and Navy General Hospital, Hot Springs, Ark., Amended	January 19, 1907
499	553	Addition to the Camp John Hay Military Reservation, Luzon, Philippine Islands	January 23, 1907
500	554	Federal Employee Members of Grand Army of the Republic Excused from Duty at Noon, Jan 26, 1907, for Funeral of Russell A. Alger	January 25, 1907
501	554½	Authorizing Appointment of Frank P. Nantz as Deputy Collector of Internal Revenue in San Juan, Puerto Rico, Without Regard to Civil Service Rules	January 29, 1907
502	555	Authorizing Appointment of James Campbell as Deputy Surveyor of Customs Without Regard to Civil Service Rules	January 30, 1907
503	556	Authorizing Isthmian Canal Commission to Hold the Quarterly Session Scheduled for the First Week in February, 1907, in Washington, D.C., Instead of on the Isthmus of Panama	January 31, 1907
504	557	Extending Time Limit for Completion of Work of the Spanish Treaty Claims Commission to September 2, 1907	February 2, 1907
505	558	Prescribing Rules Governing Peacetime Purchase of Discharge from the Marine Corps	February 4, 1907
506	559	Authorizing Appointment of Norman Oswell Cully as Messenger at Naval Academy Without Examination	February 6, 1907
507	560	Authorizing Appointment of Elizabeth M. Leech as Clerk Without Regard to Civil Service Rules	February 8, 1907
508	561	Reserving Viti Rocks, or Islands, in Bellingham Bay, Washington, for Lighthouse Purposes	February 12, 1907
509	562	Authorizing Appointment of Mrs. George H. Hildreth as Clerk in Bureau of Pensions Without Examination	February 13, 1907
510	563	Authorizing Reinstatement of Mazie R. Fountaine as Clerk in Treasury Department Without Regard to Civil Service Rules	February 15, 1907
511	564	Authorizing Appointment of Mrs. George H. Hildreth as Clerk in Classified Service Without Examination	February 16, 1907
512	565	Authorizing Appointment of W. H. Teepe as Clerk in Post Office Department Without Regard to Civil Service Rules	February 19, 1907
513	566	Authorizing Appointment of Robert L. Slagle as Clerk in Post Office Department Without Regard to Civil Service Rules	February 19, 1907
514	567	Authorizing Reinstatement of James H. Adams in Classified Service Without Regard to Civil Service Rules	February 20, 1907
515	568	Authorizing Appointment of Gilman B. Howe as Clerk in Bureau of the Census Without Regard to Civil Service Rules	February 20, 1907
516	569	Abolishing Watertown Land District, S. Dakota, and Transferring Lands, Business, and Archives to the Aberdeen Land District	February 20, 1907
517	570	Reserving Certain Described Lands at Haines, Alaska, for Educational Purposes	February 21, 1907
518	571	Authorizing Transfer of John E. Kidwell, Accountant in Isthmian Canal Service, to Classified Clerical Position in United States	February 21, 1907
519	572	Authorizing Reinstatement of Frank O'Neill as Stock Examiner in Department of Agriculture Without Regard to Civil Service Rules	February 21, 1907
520	573	Reserving Certain Described Lands at Cape Fanshaw, Alaska, for a Military Cable Station	February 26, 1907
521	574	Amending Regulations for the Army and Navy General Hospital, Hot Springs, Arkansas, Regarding Rations and Subsistence	March 1, 1907
522	575	Lands at Camp Spencer, Alaska, Reserved for Lighthouse Purposes	March 2, 1907
523	576	Coal Land Withdrawals Included by Proclamation Within Forest Reserves Not to be Excluded from Operation of Said Proclamation	March 2, 1907
534	577	Authorizing Reinstatement of Lillie L. Wright as Clerk in Patent Office Without Regard to Civil Service Rules	March 4, 1907
535	577½	Appointing John F. Stevens as Chairman and George W. Goethals as Members of Isthmian Canal Commission	March 4, 1907
536	578	Authorizing Appointment of George W. Pitts as Clerk in Treasury Department Without Regard to Civil Service Rules	March 5, 1907
537	579	Forbidding Publication of Law Opinions by Subordinates in Dept of Justice Without Approval of Attorney General	March 5, 1907
538	580	Authorizing Appointment of James G. Massey as Clerk in Department of the Interior Without Regard to Civil Service Rules	March 5, 1907
539	581	Authorizing Appointment of John C. Eversman, Sr. to Competitive Position in Pension Office Without Regard to Civil Service Rules	March 7, 1907
540	582	Authorizing Reinstatement and Transfer of P. J. Hughes to Clerk in War Department Without Regard to Civil Service Rules	March 8, 1907
541	583	Authorizing Appointment of C. F. House as Clerk in Naval Training Station, North Chicago, Illinois, Without Regard to Civil Service Rules	March 8, 1907
542	584	Designating F. C. Ainsworth and J. Franklin Bell as Acting Sec'y of War	March 11, 1907
543	585	Amending Civil Service Rules Regarding Classification of Employees in New Free-Delivery Post Offices	March 14, 1907
544	586	Dividing Canal Zone in Panama into Four Administrative Districts, and Reorganizing Municipal Offices Within	March 13, 1907
545	587	Amending Penal Code and Code of Criminal Procedure of the Canal Zone Regarding Punishments	March 13, 1907
546	588	Authorizing Ministers and Judges to Perform Marriage Ceremonies in Canal Zone	March 13, 1907
547	589	Regulating the Entrance of Japanese or Korean Laborers into U.S. Territories	March 14, 1907
548	590	Authorizing Appointment of R. H. Mitchell as Watchman in Department of the Interior Without Examination	March 15, 1907
549	591	Authorizing Appointment of Dr. A. Brown in Department of Agriculture Without Regard to Civil Service Rules	March 15, 1907
550	592	Portions of Great Falls Land District, Montana, Transferred to Glasgow Land District	March 15, 1907
551	593	Appointing New Members of the Isthmian Canal Commission and Fixing their Compensation	March 16, 1907
552	594	Authorizing Appointment of Charles P. Galpin as Clerk in Pension Office Without Examination	March 18, 1907
553	595	Amending Executive Order No. 577½ of March 4, 1907, Prescribing Additional Compensation for Isthmian Canal Commissioner George W. Goethals	March 18, 1907
554	596	Authorizing Appointment of Frederick M. Kerby as Clerk in Department of the Interior Without Regard to Civil Service Rules	March 19, 1907
555	597	Authorizing Appointment of Harlan Updegraff as Alaskan Assistant in Bureau of Education Without Regard to Civil Service Rules	March 19, 1907
556	598	Authorizing Reinstatement of Mahlon Pursel as Clerk in War Department Without Regard to Civil Service Rules	March 23, 1907
557	599	Authorizing Reinstatement of F. T. Quinlan as Inspector of Furs in Quartermaster's Department in Philadelphia Without Regard to Civil Service Rules	March 25, 1907
558	600	Authorizing Transfer of W. P. Armstrong, Law Clerk in Isthmian Canal Commission, Without Regard to Civil Service Rules	March 26, 1907
559	601	Authorizing Appointment of Theresa S. Aubright as Clerk in Classified Service Without Examination	March 26, 1907
560	602	Call for Election of Delegates in Philippine Island	March 28, 1907
561	603	Authorizing Appointment of Private Secretary to Commissioner of the General Land Office Without Regard to Civil Service Rules	March 29, 1907
562	604	Authorizing Appointment of James Bronson Reynolds as Chinese Inspector in Immigration Service Without Examination	March 30, 1907
563	605	Enlarging Grande Island Military Reservation, Luzon, Philippine Islands	March 30, 1907
564	606	Appointing George W. Goethals, U.S. Army, as Chairman of Isthmian Canal Commission	April 1, 1907
565	607	Appointing Joseph C. S. Blackburn as Member of the Isthmian Canal Commission	April 1, 1907
566	608	Authorizing Transfer of Jake T. Patrick to Competitive Position in Internal Revenue Service Without Regard to Civil Service Rules	April 3, 1907
567	609	Ordering Four Hour Workdays on Saturdays During Summer for Certain War Department Employees	April 4, 1907
568	610	Amending Instructions to Diplomatic Officers and Consular Regulations Relating to Expatriation, Citizenship, Naturalization, and Passports	April 6, 1907
569	611	Amending Consular Regulations, Paragraph 172, Regarding Registration of American Citizens Abroad	April 8, 1907
570	612	Redefining Boundaries of Camp Downes Military Reservation, Ormoc, Leyte, Philippine Islands	April 9, 1907
571	613	Spanish War Veterans in District of Columbia Excused from Duty Apr. 12 for Unveiling of Rough Riders Monument at Arlington	April 11, 1907
572	614	Authorizing Promotion of John H. McTeer to Clerk in Treasury Department After Examination Without Regard to Civil Service Rules	April 12, 1907
573	615	Amending Civil Service Rules Regarding Limitations on Transfer	April 15, 1907
574	616	Gunnison Land District, Colorado, Abolished; Transferred to Montrose Land District	April 16, 1907
575	617	Amending Consular Service Regulation of June 27, 1906, Governing Appointment and Promotion in the Consular Service	April 20, 1907
576	618	Authorizing Permanent Appointment of Charles L. Murphy as Skilled Laborer in Bureau of Fisheries Without Regard to Civil Service Rules	April 20, 1907
577	619	Excusing Members of Certain Civil War Societies in Washington from Work for Unveiling of George McClellan Statue	April 25, 1907
578	620	Authorizing Appointment of Frederick L. Dunlap as Associate Chemist in Department of Agriculture Without Examination	April 25, 1907
579	620½	Appointing Huntington Wilson as acting Secretary of State	April 25, 1907
580	621	Authorizing Permanent Appointment of Harrison L. Deam as Watchman in Department of the Interior Without Regard to Civil Service Rules	April 29, 1907
581	622	Authorizing Appointment of James D. Rowan, Jr. and Charles L. Gooch as Gardeners and William Grant as Laboratory Helper in Department of Agriculture After Examination	April 30, 1907
582	623	Authorizing Appointment of Elsie E. Lower as Clerk and Artist in Department of Agriculture Without Examination	April 30, 1907
583	624	Authorizing Appointment of Nathaniel C. Murray as Assistant Statistician in Department of Agriculture Without Regard to Civil Service Rules	April 30, 1907
584	625	Abolition of Florida Surveyor General's Office Postponed to June 30, 1908	May 4, 1907
585	626	Lands in Alaska Reserved for Educational Purposes Pending Survey by General Land Office	May 4, 1907
586	627	Authorizing Appointment of Claude I. Parker as Librarian or Clerk in General Land Office Without Regard to Civil Service Rules	May 6, 1907
587	628	Lands in Washington Allotted to Indians Snain-Chucks and Paul Restored to Public Domain	May 7, 1907
588	629	Authorizing Employment of James Powers in Bureau of the Census Without Examination	May 7, 1907
589	630	Specifying Salaries of Immigration Commission Members Jeremiah W. Jenks, William R. Wheeler, and Charles P. Neill	May 7, 1907
590	631	Authorizing Classification of 33 Laborers Performing Partially Unclassified Work in Customs House in Boston, and Prescribing Procedure for Similar Situations	May 10, 1907
591	632	Amending Civil Service Rules to Except Torpedo and Mine Planter Positions of War Department from Examination	May 10, 1907
592	632½	Directing the Transfer of the Vessel Zafiro, from the Navy Department to the War Department	May 10, 1907
593	633	Communications and Reports Relative to Certain Territories and Possessions to be Transmitted through the Interior Department	May 11, 1907
594	633½	Authorizing Interstate Commerce Commission to Appoint up to Fifteen Special Agents Before July 1, 1907, Without Regard to Civil Service Rules	May 11, 1907
595	634	Authorizing Permanent Appointment of John D. Torrey as Draftsman in Coast and Geodetic Survey Without Regard to Civil Service Rules	May 13, 1907
596	635	Boundaries of Nome and Fairbanks Land Districts, Alaska, Redefined; Juneau Land District Created	May 14, 1907
597	636	Rescinding Transfer Prescribed by Executive Order No. 372-B of November 20, 1905, as Amended, of Certain Lands Comprising Fort St. Michael Military Reservation, Alaska	May 16, 1907
598	637	Reserving Further Certain Lands of Gila National Forest, New Mexico, to Protect Water Supply of Fort Bayard	May 23, 1907
599	638	Authorizing Appointment of Maude Ward Rockwood as Clerk in War Department Without Examination	May 24, 1907
600	639	Authorizing Appointment of Clifford Rose as Private Secretary to the Public Printer Without Examination	May 28, 1907
601	640	Authorizing Appointment of William Phillips and Percival S. Heintzleman as Clerks in Department of State Without Examination	May 28, 1907
602	641	Amending Consular Regulations of 1896 Regarding Invoices of Merchandise	June 1, 1907
603	642	Amending Civil Service Rules Regarding Participation in Politics	June 3, 1907
604	643	Amending Civil Service Rules Regarding Limitations on Transfer	June 5, 1907
605	644	Authorizing Appointment of Terence V. Powderly as Chief of Division of Information in Bureau of Immigration and Naturalization Without Examination	June 5, 1907
606	645	Removing Lands Claimed by Manila Navigation Company from Mariveles Military Reservation, Bataan, Luzon, Philippine Islands	June 7, 1907
607	646	Amending Civil Service Rules to Except Certain Clerks of Post Office Department from Examination	June 8, 1907
608	647	Providing for Celebration of Marriages in the Canal Zone	May 31, 1907
609	648	Authorizing Permanent Appointment of Samuel H. Cunningham as Clerk in Bureau of Animal Industry Without Regard to Civil Service Rules	June 11, 1907
610	649	Authorizing Transfer of George S. Fox to Clerical Position in United States Without Regard to Civil Service Rules	June 11, 1907
611	650	George W. Woodruff Named Acting Interior Secretary	June 11, 1907
612	651	Establishing a Committee on Grades and Salaries in the Executive Departments	June 11, 1907
613	652	Authorizing Appointment of Mattie R. Tyler as Clerk in Post Office at Norfolk, Virginia, Without Regard to Civil Service Rules	June 11, 1907
614	653	Permitting Forest Service and Biological Survey Officers and Employees to Accept State and Territorial Appointments	June 13, 1907
615	654	Prescribing Rules Governing the Granting and Issuing of Passports in the United States	June 13, 1907
616	655	Amending Civil Service Rules Regarding Participation in Politics	June 15, 1907
617	656	Authorizing Permanent Appointment of Mary A. Greenstreet as Clerk in War Department Without Regard to Civil Service Rules	June 18, 1907
618	657	Amending Civil Service Rules to Except Certain Quarantine Workers of Public Health Service from Examination	June 24, 1907
619	658	Authorizing Reinstatement of John S. Drukker as Pressman in Bureau of Engraving and Printing Without Regard to Civil Service Rules	June 24, 1907
620	659	Amending Executive Order 469 Regarding Promotions in Consular Service	June 20, 1907
621	660	Granting Employees of the Quartermaster's Department at Honolulu, Hawaii, All Rights of Classified Personnel	June 26, 1907
622	661	Permitting Agriculture Department Officers and Employees to Accept State and Territorial Appointments	June 26, 1907
623	662	Authorizing Transfer of Horace W. Mitchell to Clerk in Marine Corps Office Without Regard to Civil Service Rules	July 4, 1907
624	663	Transferring Purchase of Isthmian Canal Commission Supplies to Supervision of Chief of Engineers	July 1, 1907
625	664	Reorganizing Accounting and Disbursing Offices and Procedures for the Isthmian Canal Commission	August 15, 1907
626	665	Reorganizing Washington Office of Isthmian Canal Commission	August 15, 1907
627	666	Malate Barracks Military Reservation, Manila, Enlarged	July 15, 1907
628	667	Authorizing Employment of Aksel Hansen in Bureau of the Census Without Examination	July 16, 1907
629	668	Authorizing Appointment of Margaret F. Sterne as Clerk in Treasury Department Without Regard to Civil Service Rules	July 25, 1907
630	669	Authorizing Appointment of Alice V. Fought as Clerk in Treasury Department Without Regard to Civil Service Rules	July 25, 1907
631	669½	Prescribing General Regulations Governing the Dominican Customs Receivership	July 25, 1907
632	670	Authorizing Reinstatement of William S. Harris as Examiner in New York Office of Treasury Department Without Regard to Civil Service Rules	July 26, 1907
633	671	Authorizing Appointment of Harry T. Paterson as Junior Civil Engineer in Engineer Department at Large Without Regard to Civil Service Rules	July 29, 1907
634	672	Amending Executive Order of September 21, 1905, to Correct the Boundaries of Reservation at Old Woman, Alaska	August 1, 1907
635	673	Revoking Executive Order of June 11, 1907, Regarding Transfer of George S. Fox to United States	August 3, 1907
636	674	Extending Time Limit for Completion of Work of the Spanish Treaty Claims Commission to March 2, 1908	August 6, 1907
637	675	Establishing Tern Islands Reservation near Mississippi River Delta in Louisiana as Preserve and Breeding Ground for Birds	August 8, 1907
638	676	Authorizing Appointment of Frank Huntington in Department of Agriculture Without Regard to Civil Service Rules	August 9, 1907
639	677	Excusing Federal Employees from Work on Labor Day	August 10, 1907
640	678	Portion of Lower Brule Indian Reservation, S. Dak., Transferred from Chamberlain Land District to Pierre Land District	August 12, 1907
641	679	Authorizing Classification of A. J. Robinson as Train-Master in Quartermaster's Department At Large	August 12, 1907
642	680	Authorizing Appointment of Chemist in Bureau of Standards Without Regard to Civil Service Rules	August 12, 1907
643	680½	Fixing Salary of Isthmian Canal Commissioners W. C. Gorgas and Jackson Smith	August 12, 1907
644	681	Authorizing Appointment of W. Dawson Johnston as Compiler of Statistics in Bureau of Education Without Regard to Civil Service Rules	August 14, 1907
645	682	Establishing Shell Keys Reservation as Reserve and Breeding Ground for Birds	August 17, 1907
646	683	Revokes Executive Order 666, Which Enlarged Malate Barracks Reservation, Manila	August 19, 1907
647	684	Amending Executive Order of February 24, 1906, Classifying Certain Laborers, to Allow Increases in Pay	August 28, 1907
648	685	Reserving Additional Lands for Fort Sill Military Reservation, Oklahoma Territory	August 29, 1907
649	686	Authorizing Appointment of Four Employees as Clerks in War Department Without Regard to Civil Service Rules	September 2, 1907
650	687	Amending Civil Service Rules Regarding Limitations on Transfer	September 7, 1907
651	688	Authorizing Appointment of Felix Neumann as Clerk in Smithsonian Institution Without Examination	September 9, 1907
652	689	Amending Civil Service Rules Regarding Limitations on Transfer	September 23, 1907
653	690	Authorizing Reinstatement of Rachel F. Sullivan as Clerk in Boston Post Office Without Regard to Civil Service Rules	September 23, 1907
654	691	Classifying R. D. Scarlett and John M. Newton as Clothing Examiners in Quartermaster's Department, Philadelphia, Without Regard to Civil Service Rules	September 23, 1907
655	692	Land in Alabama Reserved for War Dept. for Improvement of Black Warrior River	September 26, 1907
656	693	Redefining Boundaries of Camp Keithley Military Reservation, Mindanao, Philippine Islands	September 26, 1907
657	694	Ordering the United States Civil Service Commission to Assist the Porto Rican Civil Service Commission	September 27, 1907
658	695	Authorizing Transfer of Charles M. Irelan to Clerk in War Department Without Regard to Civil Service Rules	September 28, 1907
659	696	Authorizing Transfer of Charles E. Knight to Shipping Commissioner in San Francisco Without Regard to Civil Service Rules	September 28, 1907
660	697	Authorizing Appointment of William Stimpel as Disciplinarian at Carlisle, Pennsylvania Indian School After Examination	October 5, 1907
661	698	Amending Tariff of Consular Fees to Specify Passport Extension Fee as $1.00	October 14, 1907
662	699	Establishing Three Arch Rocks Reservation as Preserve and Breeding Ground for Native Birds and Animals	October 14, 1907
663	700	Authorizing Continued Employment of John V. Davis as Automatic Scale Mechanician Without Regard to Civil Service Rules	October 21, 1907
664	701	EO of April 4, 1853, Reserving Lands at Rock Harbor, Isle Royale, Lake Superior, Michigan, Partially Revoked	October 21, 1907
665	702	Reserving Lands in Alaska for Army Signal Corps Telegraph Lines	October 23, 1907
666	703	Establishing Flattery Rocks Reservation as Preserve and Breeding Ground for Native Birds and Animals	October 23, 1907
667	704	Establishing Copalis Rock Reservation as Preserve and Breeding Ground for Native Birds and Animals	October 23, 1907
668	705	Establishing Quillayute Needles Reservation as Preserve and Breeding Ground for Native Birds and Animals	October 23, 1907
669	706	Authorizing Permanent Appointment of Charles H. McLellan as Superintendent in Revenue Cutter Service Without Regard to Civil Service Rules	October 30, 1907
670	707	Authorizing Reinstatement of John P. Scruggs as Deputy Collector in Internal Revenue Service Without Regard to Civil Service Rules	October 30, 1907
671	708	Post Cemetery Lands Reserved for Fort Sumner Previously Reserved by EO of May 22, 1871, Released	November 2, 1907
672	709	Addition to the Navajo Reservation in Arizona and New Mexico	November 9, 1907
673	710	Authorizing Appointment of Joseph B. Dalton as Skilled Laborer in Bureau of the Census Without Examination	November 9, 1907
674	711	Addition to the Jicarilla Indian Reservation in New Mexico	November 11, 1907
675	712	Prescribing Same Extra Compensation for Marine Corps Signalmen as Received by Navy Signalmen	November 16, 1907
676	713	Authorizing Appointment of Carriage Drivers for President and Department Heads Without Regard to Civil Service Rules	November 20, 1907
677	714	Amending Regulations to Govern the Employment of Unskilled Laborers Outside Washington, D.C.	November 22, 1907
678	715	Authorizing Civil Service Commission to Waive Examination Requirements Under Certain Circumstances	November 22, 1907
679	716	Adjusting Rules for Extra Pay for Navy Gun Pointers	November 28, 1907
680	717	Granting Certain Employees of the Technologic Branch of the Geologic Survey All Rights of Classified Personnel Except Transfer	December 7, 1907
681	718	Establishing East Timbalier Island Reservation as Preserve and Breeding Ground for Native Birds	December 7, 1907
682	719	Authorizing Transfer of William McCambridge to Competitive Position in Interstate Commerce Commission Without Examination	December 13, 1907
683	720	Charles Earl, Commerce and Labor Dept. Solicitor, Designated to Act as Interior Sec'y During the Absence of the Sec'y, the Assistant Sec'y	December 13, 1907
684	721	Authorizing Access to Historical Records of Executive Departments by Agents of Historical Research of the Carnegie Institution of Washington	December 14, 1907
685	722	Authorizing Extended Temporary Employment of Emily G. Stickney as Clerk Examiner in Bureau of Chemistry Without Regard to Civil Service Rules	December 17, 1907
686	723	Providing for Examinations for Appointment in the United States Military and Naval Academies	December 17, 1907

=== 1908 ===
Relative No.	Absolute No.	Title/Description	Date signed
687	724	Instructions to Diplomatic Officers of 1897, Paragraph 42, and Consular Regulations of 1896, Paragraph 441, Amended to Define Relative Rank of Diplomatic Officers	January 3, 1908
688	725	Amending Executive Order No. 527 of November 17, 1906, Newly Defining the Powers of the Isthmian Canal Commission and Its Chairman]	January 6, 1908
689	726	Civil Service Rules Section A, Subdivision IX, Amended to Allow Appointment of Shipping Commissioners in Certain Ports (Revoked by EO 733)	January 6, 1908
690	727	Authorizing Continued Retention of Fifteen Temporary Indian Service Employees Without Regard to Civil Service Rules	January 8, 1908
691	728	Authorizing Continued Retention of 126 Union Agency Employees Without Regard to Civil Service Rules	January 8, 1908
692	729	Amending Canal Zone Penal Code Regarding Certain Misdemeanors	January 9, 1908
693	730	Amending Canal Zone Regulations Regarding Unclaimed Property Held by Common Carriers	January 9, 1908
694	731	Amending Canal Zone Laws Regarding Composition of Judicial Circuits	January 9, 1908
695	732	Applying Law No. 6 of the Republic of Panama, Regarding Exclusion of Certain Aliens, to the Canal Zone	January 9, 1908
696	733	Amending Civil Service Rules to Except Certain Shipping Commissioners of Department of Commerce and Labor from Examination	January 13, 1908
697	734	Authorizing Appointment of Ernest Coldwell as Revenue Agent in Internal Revenue Service Without Regard to Civil Service Rules	January 16, 1908
698	735	Huron Land District, South Dakota, Abolished; Transferred to Pierre Land District	January 17, 1908
699	736	Certain Lands in Colfax Land District, New Mexico, Transferred to Lincoln Land District	January 17, 1908
700	737	Reserving Land in Minto, Alaska, for Use by Army Signal Corps in Telegraph Line Operation	January 18, 1908
701	738	Authorizing Employment of James S. Wickham in Bureau of the Census Without Examination	January 20, 1908
702	739	Authorizing Appointment of Indians as Messengers in the Indian Affairs Office Subject to Noncompetitive Examination (Revoked by EO 754)	January 24, 1908
703	740	Amending Civil Service Rules Regarding Certification Procedures	January 27, 1908
704	741	Amending Civil Service Rules Regarding Temporary Appointments	January 27, 1908
705	742	Specifying Classification and Pay for Navy Mess Attendants, and Prescribing Additional Pay for Cooks and Stewards	January 28, 1908
706	743	Addition to the Jicarilla Indian Reservation in New Mexico	January 28, 1908
707	744	Addition to the Navajo Reservation in Arizona and New Mexico	January 28, 1908
708	745	Reserving Certain Described Lands in Alabama for Use of the War Department for Improvement of the Black Warrior, Warrior, and Tombigbee Rivers	January 30, 1908
709	746	Woodward Land District, Okla., Abolished, and Lands, Business, and Archives Transferred to the Alva Land District	February 4, 1908
710	747	Authorizing Reinstatement of Isabel E. McKinley in War Department Without Regard to Civil Service Rules	February 4, 1908
711	748	Amending Civil Service Rules Regarding Mint and Assay Service Positions Excepted from Examination	February 4, 1908
712	749	Extending Time for Completion of Work of the Spanish Treaty Claims Commission to September 2, 1908	February 5, 1908
713	750	Providing Regulations Governing the Right to Trial by Jury in the Canal Zone	February 6, 1908
714	751	Authorizing Reinstatement of S. Baillio to Norfolk Navy Yard Without Regard to Civil Service Rules	February 7, 1908
715	752	Authorizing Reinstatement and Transfer of Douglas B. Thompson to Departmental Service Without Regard to Civil Service Rules	February 7, 1908
716	753	Reserving Certain Described Lands in Washington for Lighthouse Purposes	February 10, 1908
717	754	Amending Civil Service Rules Regarding Exceptions from Examination for Employees in Office of Indian Affairs	February 15, 1908
718	755	Yellowstone Land District, Montana, Abolished; Transferred to Glasgow Land District	February 15, 1908
719	756	North Platte Land District, Nebraska, Abolished; Transferred to the Alliance Land District	February 17, 1908
720	757	Amending Executive Order No. 746 of February 4, 1908, Consolidating the Woodward and Alva Land Districts, to Re-Locate the Land Office to Woodward, Oklahoma	February 17, 1908
721	758	Prescribing Procedure for Submitting Recommendations Affecting Civil Service Rules	February 20, 1908
722	759	Amending Executive Order No. 755 of February 15, 1908, Transferring Certain Montana lands from the Yellowstone Land District to the Glasgow Land District, to Transfer Additional Lands	February 21, 1908
723	760	Reserving Certain Described Lands at Lowell Point, Resurrection Bay, Alaska, for the Navy Department for Use as a Coaling Depot	February 21, 1908
724	761	Authorizing Appointment of Edwyn N. Purvis as Clerk in Classified Service in United States Without Regard to Civil Service Rules	February 21, 1908
725	762	Authorizing Appointment of Edward J. Tupper as Deputy Collector and Inspector of Customs in Stamford, Connecticut, Without Regard to Civil Service Rules	February 22, 1908
726	763	Establishing Mosquito Inlet Reservation in Florida as Preserve and Breeding Ground for Native Birds	February 24, 1908
727	763½	Authorizing Construction of Fortifications on the Island of Corregidor, Manilla Bay, PI Upon Securing Any Lands Needed	February 25, 1908
728	764	Transferring Mississippi from the Internal Revenue Collection District of Louisiana to the Internal Revenue Collection District of Alabama	February 28, 1908
729	765	Reserving Land in Hogan, Alaska, for Use by Army Signal Corps in Telegraph Line Operation	March 3, 1908
730	766	Authorizing Appointment of Charles L. Babcock as Immigrant Inspector in Immigration Service Without Examination	March 4, 1908
731	767	Revoking Executive Order of March 26, 1901 and Prescribing a New Ration for the Army	March 5, 1908
732	768	Authorizing Transfer of Philip W. Reinhard, Jr., Customs Clerk, to Competitive Service Without Regard to Civil Service Rules	March 6, 1908
733	769	Certain Lands Near Chena and Fairbanks, Alaska, Reserved for Signal Corps Telegraph Lines; EO 328-B Revoked	March 13, 1908
734	770	Amending Civil Service Rules to Except Certain Caretakers of Former Military Reservations from Examination	March 17, 1908
735	771	Portion of Hawkins Island, Prince William Sound, Alaska, Reserved as Navy Coaling Station	March 18, 1908
736	772	Authorizing Appointment of Wilhelm Lutz to Position in Immigration Bureau Without Regard to Civil Service Rules	March 21, 1908
737	773	Redefining Boundaries of Naval Coaling Depot Reservation at Lowell Point, Resurrection Bay, Alaska	March 23, 1908
738	774	Amending Regulations Governing the Right to Trial by Jury in the Canal Zone	March 31, 1908
739	775	EO of May 9, 1898, Which Reserved Lands in Washington, Revoked	April 1, 1908
740	776	Executive Order 707, Reinstating John P. Scruggs, Confirmed	April 4, 1908
741	777	Prescribing Hours of Labor at Navy Yards	April 4, 1908
742	778	Transferring Certain Lands in Sitka, Alaska, from Navy Department to Army Signal Corps for Use as Cable House	April 4, 1908
743	779	Establishing Tortugas Keys Reservation in Florida as Preserve and Breeding Ground for Native Birds	April 6, 1908
744	780	Authorizing Appointment of Harry A. Strohm as Special Agent in Office of the Third Assistant Postmaster General Without Examination	April 13, 1908
745	781	Authorizing Appointment of Henry C. Towers as Expert and Chief in Bureau of Forestry Without Examination	April 15, 1908
746	782	Reserving Land in Fairbanks, Alaska, for Use by Army Signal Corps as Wireless Telegraph Station	April 16, 1908
747	783	Authorizing Appointment of William S. Murphy as Chinese Inspector in Immigration Service Without Examination	April 17, 1908
748	784	Authorizing Reinstatement of Alpheus H. Mahone as Fish Culturist in Bureau of Fisheries Without Regard to Civil Service Rules	April 20, 1908
749	785	Amending Civil Service Rules Regarding Positions Excepted from Examination for Interstate Commerce Commission Personnel	April 21, 1908
750	786	Authorizing Reinstatement of John Krey as Assistant Engineer in Engineer Department of the United States Army Without Regard to Civil Service Rules	April 23, 1908
751	787	San Juan National Forest, Colorado, Diminished	April 24, 1908
752	788	Amending Canal Zone Laws Regarding Defacement or Removal of Survey Monuments	April 24, 1908
753	789	Govt. Employees at San Fran., Oakland, Berkeley, Alameda Excused on May 6, 1908 for Reception of Battleship Fleet	April 30, 1908
754	790	Enlarging Camp Stotsenburg Military Reservation Near Angeles, Pampanga, Luzon, Philippine Islands	April 30, 1908
755	791	Authorizing Appointment of Katherine J. Fenton as Draftsman in Departments of the Washington, D.C. Without Regard to Civil Service Rules	May 1, 1908
756	792	Reserving Fourteen Tracts of Land in Alaska for Stations on Third Section of United States Military Telegraph Lines	May 4, 1908
757	793	Lands in California Eliminated From Lighthouse Reserve of EO of Jan 26, 1867	May 5, 1908
758	794	Creating Commission to Examine Laws for Security of Passengers and Crew on United States Vessels	May 12, 1908
759	795	Ordering Heads of Executive Departments to Arrange Salaries to Conform to Recommendations of Committee on Grades and Salaries	May 13, 1908
760	796	Reserving Certain Lands on Island of Biliran, Philippine Islands, for Military Purposes	May 13, 1908
761	797	Reserving Land in Chena, Alaska, for Use by Army Signal Corps in Telegraph Line Operation	May 16, 1908
762	798	Authorizing Continued Employment of Richard H. Taylor as Inspector in Department of Commerce and Labor Without Regard to Civil Service Rules	May 23, 1908
763	799	Civil and Spanish War Veterans Excused on May 27, 1908 for Parade Regarding Removal of Body of Vice President [George] Clinton	May 23, 1908
764	800	Authorizing Employment of John M. Jones as Tariff Expert in Interstate Commerce Commission Without Examination	May 26, 1908
765	801	Pocatello National Forest, Idaho and Utah, Enlarged by Adding Port Neuf National Forest and Part of Bear River National Forest	May 26, 1908
766	802	Abolishing Bear River National Forest and Establishing Cache National Forest	May 26, 1908
767	803	Fort Keogh Military Reservation Abolished; Transferred to Department of Interior	May 28, 1908
768	804	EO 795 Extended to Clerks and Draftsmen at Navy Yards	May 29, 1908
769	805	Authorizing Employment of Charles Lutz in Charge of Statistics and Accounts in Interstate Commerce Commission Without Examination	June 2, 1908
770	806	Disposition of Former Pennsylvania Railroad Company Station in Washington Authorized	June 5, 1908
771	807	Four-Hour Workday on Saturdays from July to September for Skilled Mechanics at Navy Yards	June 5, 1908
772	808	Portions of Man Key and Woman Key, Florida, Reserved for Navy Dept.	June 8, 1908
773	809	Instructing Heads of Departments to Furnish Information to National Conservation Commission Upon Request	June 8, 1908
774	810	Boundaries of Lemmon Land District, North and South Dakota, Redfined	June 8, 1908
775	810½	EOs 447 and 584 Revoked	June 8, 1908
776	811	Authorizing Reinstatement of William J. Dow as Private Secretary to Public Printer Without Regard to Civil Service Rules	June 9, 1908
777	812	Salary of William R. Wheeler, Member Immigration Commission, Fixed at $7500 Per Annum	June 10, 1908
778	813	Whitman National Forest, Oregon, Created	June 13, 1908
779	814	Malheur National Forest, Oregon, Created	June 13, 1908
780	815	Umatilla National Forest, Oregon, Created	June 13, 1908
781	816	Deschutes National Forest, Oregon, Created	June 13, 1908
782	817	Fremont National Forest, Oregon, Created	June 13, 1908
783	818	Authorizing Temporary Appointments Under Banking Act of 1908 in Treasury Department Without Regard to Civil Service Rules	June 15, 1908
784	819	Authorizing Appointment of Andrew Christensen as Special Agent in General Land Office Without Regard to Civil Service Rules	June 15, 1908
785	819½	Authorizing Appointment of John McCarthy as Laborer in Charge of Warehouse in War Department Without Regard to Civil Service Rules	June 18, 1908
786	820	Establishing Columbia National Forest in Washington from Portion of Rainier National Forest	June 18, 1908
787	821	Rainier National Forest, Wash., Modified	June 18, 1908
788	822	Washington National Forest, Wash., Diminished	June 18, 1908
789	823	Chelan National Forest, Wash., Created	June 18, 1908
790	824	Snoqualmie National Forest, Wash., Created	June 18, 1908
791	825	Wenatchee National Forest, Wash., Created	June 18, 1908
792	826	Fillmore National Forest, Utah, Modified	June 18, 1908
793	827	Nebo National Forest, Utah, Created	June 18, 1908
794	828	Authorizing Reinstatement of Frank E. Elder in Government Printing Office Without Regard to Civil Service Rules	June 19, 1908
795	829	Officers of Assistant Japanese and Chinese Sec'ys in Embassy at Tokio and Legation at Peking to be filled in Rotation	June 20, 1908
796	830	Authorizing Appointment of Basil Miles as Superintendent in Post Office Department Without Examination	June 24, 1908
797	831	Yachts of Royal Vancouver Yacht Club Authorized to Visit U.S. Without Entry, Clearance, or Charges	June 25, 1908
798	832	Amending Civil Service Rules Regarding Exceptions from Examination for Paymasters in New York Customs District	June 25, 1908
799	833	Lewis and Clark National Forest, Mont., Diminished	June 25, 1908
800	834	Blackfeet National Forest, Mont., Created	June 25, 1908
801	835	Flathead National Forest, Mont., Created	June 25, 1908
802	836	Kootenai National Forest, Mont. and Idaho, Modified	June 25, 1908
803	837	Routt National Forest, Colo., Created	June 25, 1908
804	838	Cabinet National Forest, Mont. and Idaho., Diminished	June 25, 1908
805	839	Hayden National Forest, Colo., Created	June 25, 1908
806	840	Challis National Forest, Idaho, Created	June 26, 1908
807	841	Salmon National Forest, Idaho, Created	June 26, 1908
808	842	Clearwater National Forest, Idaho	June 26, 1908
809	843	Coeur D'Alene National Forest, Idaho and Mont., Modified	June 26, 1908
810	844	Pend Oreille National Forest, Idaho, Created	June 26, 1908
811	845	Kaniksu National Forest, Idaho, Created	June 26, 1908
812	846	Angeles National Forest, Calif., Created	June 26, 1908
813	847	San Luis National Forest, Calif., Created	June 26, 1908
814	848	Carson National Forest, N. Mex., Created	June 26, 1908
815	849	Jemez National Forest, N. Mex., Diminished	June 26, 1908
816	850	Sundance National Forest, Wyo., Created	June 26, 1908
817	851	Black Hills National Forest, S. Dak., Diminished	June 26, 1908
818	852	Santa Barbara National Forest, Calif., Modified	June 26, 1908
819	853	Weiser National Forest, Calif., Diminished	June 26, 1908
820	854	Establishing Nezperce National Forest from Portions of Bitterroot and Weiser National Forests	June 26, 1908
821	855	Idaho National Forest, Idaho, Created	June 26, 1908
822	856	Payette National Forest, Idaho, Modified	June 26, 1908
823	857	Boise National Forest, Idaho, Created	June 26, 1908
824	858	Sawtooth National Forest, Idaho, Diminished	June 26, 1908
825	859	Modifying Lemhi National Forest	June 26, 1908
826	860	Siuslaw National Forest, Oreg., Created	June 30, 1908
827	861	Cheyenne National Forest, Wyo., Created	June 30, 1908
828	862	Medicine Bow National Forest, Wyo., Diminished	June 30, 1908
829	863	Cascade National Forest, Oreg.., Created	June 30, 1908
830	864	Oregon National Forest, Oreg., Created	June 30, 1908
831	865	Establishing Siuslaw National Forest and Redefining Umpqua National Forest in Oregon from Portions of Cascade, Fremont, and Former Umpqua National Forests	June 30, 1908
832	866	Cheyenne National Forest, Oreg. and Calif., Created	June 30, 1908
833	867	Crater National Forest, Oregon and California	June 30, 1908
834	868	Sitgreaves National Forest, Arizona	July 1, 1908
835	869	Tonto National Forest, Arizona	July 1, 1908
836	870	Modifying Holy Cross National Forest, Colorado	July 1, 1908
837	871	Targhee National Forest, Idaho and Wyo., Created	July 1, 1908
838	872	Teton National Forest, Wyo., Created	July 1, 1908
839	873	Wyoming National Forest, Wyo., Created	July 1, 1908
840	874	Bonneville National Forest, Created	July 1, 1908
841	875	Absaroka National Forest, Mont., Created	July 1, 1908
842	876	Apache National Forest, Arizona	July 1, 1908
843	877	Beaverhead National Forest, Mont., Created	July 1, 1908
844	878	Madison National Forest, Mont., Modified	July 1, 1908
845	879	Gallatin National Forest, Mont., Modified	July 1, 1908
846	880	Deerlodge National Forest, Mont., Created	July 1, 1908
847	881	Helena National Forest, Mont., Modified	July 1, 1908
848	882	Missoula National Forest, Mont., Enlarged	July 1, 1908
849	883	Bitterroot National Forest, Mont., Enlarged	July 1, 1908
850	884	Uinta National Forest, Utah, Modified	July 1, 1908
851	885	Uncompahgre National Forest, Colo., Enlarged	July 1, 1908
852	886	San Juan National Forest, Colo., Modified	July 1, 1908
853	887	Rio Grande National Forest, Colo., Created	July 1, 1908
854	888	Pike National Forest, Colo., Created	July 1, 1908
855	889	Montezuma National Forest, Colo., Modified	July 1, 1908
856	890	Leadville National Forest, Colo., Modified	July 1, 1908
857	891	Gunnison National Forest, Colo., Modified	July 1, 1908
858	892	Cochetopah National Forest, Colo., Modified	July 1, 1908
859	893	Arapaho National Forest, Colo., Created	July 1, 1908
860	894	Battlement National Forest, Colo., Created	July 1, 1908
861	895	Shoshone National Forest, Wyo., Created	July 1, 1908
862	896	Beartooth National Forest, Mont., Created	June 30, 1908
863	897	Tahoe National Forest, Calif., Modified	July 2, 1908
864	898	Mono National Forest, California and Nevada	July 2, 1908
865	899	Inyo National Forest, Calif. and Nev., Modified	July 2, 1908
866	900	Trinity National Forest, Calif., Modified	July 2, 1908
867	901	Stanislaus National Forest, Calif., Modified	July 2, 1908
868	902	Sierra National Forest, Calif., Diminished	July 2, 1908
869	903	Shasta National Forest, Calif., Modified	July 2, 1908
870	904	Establishing Sequoia National Forest in California from Portions of Sierra National Forest	July 2, 1908
871	905	Plumas National Forest, Calif., Modified	July 2, 1908
872	906	Lassen National Forest, Calif., Created	July 2, 1908
873	907	California National Forest, Calif., Created	July 2, 1908
874	908	55 Specified National Forests Consolidated and/or Renamed	July 2, 1908
875	909	Kaibab National Forest, Arizona	July 2, 1908
876	910	Authorizing Reinstatement of Joe M. Johnson in Government Printing Office Without Regard to Civil Service Rules	July 2, 1908
877	911	George Uhler Designated to Act as Supervising Inspector of steam Vessels in 7th District, Cincinnati, Pending Regular Appointment	July 3, 1908
878	912	Boundaries of Deschutes National Forest, Oreg. Redefined	July 14, 1908
879	913	Boundaries of Fremont National Forest, Oreg., Redefined	July 14, 1908
880	914	Authorizing Appointment of Four People as Experts in Liquor Suppression Among Indians Without Regard to Civil Service Rules	July 16, 1908
881	915	Authorizing Reinstatement of Herman Gluck in Internal Revenue Service Without Regard to Civil Service Rules	July 16, 1908
882	916	Authorizing Reinstatement of George Terwilliger in Government Printing Office Without Regard to Civil Service Rules	July 16, 1908
883	917	Authorizing Reinstatement of William E. Shields in Government Printing Office Without Regard to Civil Service Rules	July 18, 1908
884	918	EO 503, Authorizing Extra Pay for Marine Corps Messmen, Amended	July 21, 1908
885	919	Further Reserving Lands in Gila National Forest, New Mexico, to Protect Water Supply of Fort Bayard	July 23, 1908
886	920	Reserving Lands in Tanana, Alaska, Adjoining Fort Gibbon Military Reservation, for Use by Army Signal Corps	July 25, 1908
887	921	Extending Time for Completion of Work of the Spanish Treaty Claims Commission to March 2, 1909	August 3, 1908
888	922	Amending Regulations Governing Employment of Unskilled Laborers Outside Washington, D.C. Regarding Period of Eligibility	August 3, 1908
889	923	Establishing Key West Reservation in Florida as Preserve and Breeding Ground for Native Birds	August 8, 1908
890	924	Establishing Klamath Lake Reservation in Oregon and California as Preserve and Breeding Ground for Native Birds	August 8, 1908
891	925	George W. Woodruff, Assistant Attorney General, Designated to Act as Interior Secretary During Absences	August 10, 1908
892	926	Excusing Federal Employees From Work on Labor Day	August 10, 1908
893	927	Extending Military Reservation on Batan and Cacraray, Philippine Islands	August 14, 1908
894	928	Amending Penal Code of Canal Zone Regarding Punishment for Grand Larceny	August 14, 1908
895	929	Establishing Lake Malheur Reservation in Oregon as Preserve and Breeding Ground for Native Birds	August 18, 1908
896	930	Advancing Money to Capt. Albert Mertz to Transfer Lighthouse Establishment Vessels to Pacific Coast	August 21, 1908
897	931	Authorizing Appointment of Harry H. Weddle as Inspector in Charge in Immigration Service Without Examination	August 27, 1908
898	932	Establishing Chase Lake Reservation in North Dakota as Reserve and Breeding Ground for Native Birds	August 28, 1908
899	933	Amending Civil Service Rules Regarding Exceptions from Examination for Civilian Teachers in Military Academies	September 3, 1908
900	934	Some South Dakota Lands Within Belle Fourche Irrigation Project Further Reserved for Agricultural Experiments	September 7, 1908
901	935	Authorizing Appointment of Four People in Bureau of the Census Without Regard to Civil Service Rules	September 9, 1908
902	936	Certain Land in California Reserved for Lighthouse Purposes	September 10, 1908
903	937	Creating Interdepartmental Statistical Committee to Promote Uniformity of Statistical Methods and Results	September 10, 1908
904	938	Authorizing Appointment of Drs. Hopkins and Cunningham as Physicians on Isthmus of Panama Without Regard to Civil Service Rules	September 15, 1908
905	939	Establishing Pine Island Reservation in Florida as Preserve and Breeding Ground for Native Birds	September 15, 1908
906	940	Authorizing Appointment of Albert W. Pontius as Clerk in Department of State Without Examination	September 25, 1908
907	941	Authorizing Transfer of Charles H. Cameron to Chinese Inspector in Immigration Service Without Examination	September 26, 1908
908	942	Establishing Palma Sola Reservation in Florida as Preserve and Breeding Ground for Native Birds	September 26, 1908
909	943	Establishing Matlacha Pass Reservation in Florida as Preserve and Breeding Ground for Native Birds	September 26, 1908
910	944	Authorizing Continued Employment of Three Clerks in Isthmian Canal Service Without Examination	September 30, 1908
911	945	Reserving Lands in Circle, Alaska, for Use by Army Signal Corps as Wireless Telegraph Station	September 30, 1908
912	946	Amending Civil Service Rules Regarding Exceptions from Examination for Certain Isthmian Canal Commission Employees	October 3, 1908
913	947	Classifying Eight Employees of the Isthmian Canal Commission	October 3, 1908
914	948	Authorizing Appointment of Melvin W. Sheppard as Night Inspector in Customs Service Without Regard to Civil Service Rules	October 2, 1908
915	949	Amending Civil Service Rules Regarding Retransfers to Positions Previously Held	October 7, 1908
916	950	Authorizing Classification of Certain Employees Hired Prior to Attorney General Ruling	October 9, 1908
917	951	Authorizing Appointment of William Norman as Assistant Inspector of Hulls in Steamboat Inspection Service Without Examination	October 12, 1908
918	952	Authorizing Appointment of John A. Flickinger as Watchman Without Regard to Civil Service Rules	October 17, 1908
919	953	Amending Regulations Governing Employment of Unskilled Laborers Outside Washington, D.C. Regarding Demotions and Transfers	October 21, 1908
920	954	Amending Civil Service Rules Regarding Exceptions from Examination for Civilian Instructors in Revenue Cutter Service	October 21, 1908
921	955	Amending Regulations Governing Employment of Unskilled Laborers in Washington, D.C. Regarding Demotions and Temporary Appointments	October 21, 1908
922	956	Authorizing Appointment of Frederick Koch as Disciplinarian at Indian School Upon Noncompetitive Examination	October 21, 1908
923	957	Authorizing Appointment of Conrad Henzman as Messenger in New York Military Headquarters Without Examination	October 23, 1908
924	958	Establishing Island Bay Reservation in Florida as Preserve and Breeding Ground for Native Birds	October 23, 1908
925	959	Authorizing Reinstatement of Mary A. Eldridge as Clerk in War Department Without Regard to Civil Service Rules	October 26, 1908
926	960	Reserving Lands on Montague Island, Prince William Sound, Alaska, for Use by Army Signal Corps in Operation of Telegraph Lines	October 26, 1908
927	961	Establishing Loch Katrine Reservation in Oregon as Preserve and Breeding Ground for Native Birds	October 26, 1908
928	962	Reserving Lands in Makanalua, Molokai Island, Hawaii, for Lighthouse Purposes	October 27, 1908
929	963	Authorizing Appointment of Charles W. Edwards as Classified Laborer in Treasury Department Without Regard to Civil Service Rules	October 28, 1908
930	964	Modifying Boundaries of Malate Barracks Reservation, Manila, Philippine Islands	November 2, 1908
931	965	Certain Lands in Susitna and Tyonic, Alaska, Reserved for Educational Purposes	November 4, 1908
932	966	Amending Canal Zone Regulations Regarding Appeals, and Repealing Certain Sections of Code of Criminal Procedure	November 7, 1908
933	967	Amending Civil Service Rules Regarding Exceptions from Examination for Transferred Employees in Isthmian Canal Commission	November 9, 1908
934	968	Authorizing Appointment of Hilworth T. B. Jones as Translator in Office of Naval Intelligence Without Regard to Civil Service Rules	November 11, 1908
935	969	Defining the Duties of the United States Marine Corps	November 12, 1908
936	970	Further Reserving Lands in Gila National Forest, New Mexico, to Protect Water Supply of Fort Bayard	November 13, 1908
937	971	Authorizing Retention of War Department Laborers in San Francisco	November 13, 1908
938	972	Authorizing Reinstatement of George F. Cooke as Clerk in Post Office Without Regard to Civil Service Rules	November 13, 1908
939	973	Civil War Veterans and Members of Women's Relief Corps and Sons of Veterans Excused from Duty Nov 25, 1908, for Unveiling of Statue of Philip Henry Sheridan	November 17, 1908
940	974	Dardanelle Land District, Ark., Abolished; Transferred to Little Rock Land District	November 21, 1908
941	975	Restoring Certain Chehalis Indian Lands to Public Domain and Allotting Same to Ada McKay	November 23, 1908
942	976	Amending Civil Service Rules Regarding Exceptions from Examination for Special Agents of General Land Office	November 24, 1908
943	977	Forbidding Most Notaries Public in Government Service to Charge Fees for Notarial Acts	November 24, 1908
944	978	Reserving Lands on Oahu, Territory of Hawaii, for Observation Stations in Connection with Defensive Works	November 24, 1908
945	979	Reserving Lands on North Side of Gulkana River, Alaska, for Use by Army Signal Corps in Operation of Telegraph Lines	November 24, 1908
946	980	Amendment of Executive Order No. 330-B of June 12, 1905, Establishing Limits of Punishment for Enlisted Men of the Army	November 25, 1908
947	981	Authorizing Appointment of Stephen C. Stuntz as Soil Bibliographer in Soils Bureau	November 25, 1908
948	982	Amending Civil Service Rules to Limit Exceptions from Examination for Certain Postmasters	November 30, 1908
949	983	Authorizing Appointment of Fourth Class Postmasters Without Examination Until Civil Service Registers Available	November 30, 1908
950	984	Admission of Deaf-Mutes to Examinations for Civil Service	December 1, 1908
951	985	Adding Certain Lands in Nonucan, Mindanao, Philippine Islands, to Camp Overton Military Reservation as Target Range	December 1, 1908
952	986	Amending Civil Service Rules Regarding Exceptions from Examination for Army Transport Service	December 3, 1908
953	987	Authorizing Appointment of Dell A. Baker as Deputy Collector in Office of Collector of Customs at Port of New York	December 3, 1908
954	988	Colby Land District, Kansas, Abolished; Transferred to Topeka Land District	December 7, 1908
955	989	Prescribing Regulations for Physical Examinations for Marine Corps Officers	December 9, 1908
956	990	Authorizing Appointment of Wilhelm Lutz to Position in Customs Service	December 10, 1908
957	991	Authorizing Appointment of Georgia M. Sargent to Position in Classified Service	December 9, 1908
958	992	Authorizing Transfer of Walter R. Gallaher to Classified Clerical Position in United States	December 11, 1908
959	993	Authorizing Promotion of Herman W. Kuchmeister to Day Inspector	December 18, 1908
960	994	Authorizing Appointment of Clare Kiggins to Position in Classified Service Upon Passing Examination	December 22, 1908
961	995	Transfer of Clerks Serving in Cuba to Classified Service	December 23, 1908
962	996	Appointing H. A. Gudger as Chief Justice of the Supreme Court of the Canal Zone	December 23, 1908
963	997	Appointing Wesley M. Owen as Associate Justice of the Supreme Court of the Canal Zone	December 23, 1908
964	998	Authorizing Transfer of W. W. Adams to Position of Deputy Collector of Internal Revenue Upon Passing Examination	December 28, 1908
965	999	Authorizing Remission for Portion of Chinese Boxer Rebellion Indemnity	December 28, 1908
966	1000	Altering Lands Composing Reservation of Navajo Indians	December 30, 1908

=== 1909 ===
Relative No.	Absolute No.	Title/Description	Date signed
967	1001	Authorizing Admittance of W. W. Adams to Examination Without Reference to Civil Service Rules	January 1, 1909
968	1002	Providing that Railroad Cars in Canal Zone Be Equipped with Safety Appliances	January 6, 1909
969	1003	Prescribing Regulations for Navy and Marine Corps Men Aboard Army Transports, and Army Men Aboard Naval Vessels	January 7, 1909
970	1004	Amending Civil Service Rules Providing for Transfer After Two Years of Service in the Office of the President of the United States	January 9, 1909
971	1005	Authorizing Appointment of Grace W. Nettleton to Clerkship in Treasury Department	January 11, 1909
972	1006	Authorizing Reinstatement of Fannie C. Chase as Skilled Laborer in Government Printing Office	January 11, 1909
973	1007	Revoking Executive Order 632½ of May. 10, 1907, and Directing the Retransfer of the Vessel Zafiro, from the War Sec'y to the Navy Sec'y	January 12, 1909
974	1008	Transferring Portion of Kaakaukukui Reef Naval Reservation in Hawaii to War Department	January 15, 1909
975	1009	Land Office at Mitchell, S. Dak., Transferred to Gregory; Certain Described Lands of the Chamberlain Land District Transferred to ...	January 18, 1909
976	1010	Creating the Council of the Fine Arts	January 19, 1909
977	1011	Re-establishing Fort Keogh Military Reservation in Montana	January 22, 1909
978	1012	Authorizing Continuance of William H. Baldwin as Special Examiner in Corporations Bureau	January 23, 1909
979	1013	Reserving Certain Described Lands in Minnesota for Lighthouse Purposes	January 23, 1909
980	1014	Enlarging Pelican Island Reservation, Florida	January 26, 1909
981	1015	Authorizing Reinstatement of Edwin W. Hutcheson in Classified Service Upon Passing Examination	January 27, 1909
982	1016	Authorizing Appointment of Edward C. Baker as Clerk of Class 3 in State Department	January 28, 1909
983	1017	Authorizing Reinstatement of Daniel F. Dolan as Post-Office Inspector with Suspension of Sixty Days	January 30, 1909
984	1018	Amending Civil Service Rules to Except National Bank Examiners and Receivers from Examination	February 3, 1909
985	1019	Establishing Hawaiian Islands Reservation as Preserve and Breeding Ground for Native Birds	February 3, 1909
986	1020	Reserving Certain Described Lands in Minnesota for Lighthouse Purposes	February 4, 1909
987	1021	Reserving Certain Described Lands on Michigan Island, Wisconsin, for Lighthouse Purposes	February 4, 1909
988	1022	Time Limit for Completion of Work of Spanish Treaty Claims Commission Extended to Sept. 2, 1909	February 5, 1909
989	1023	Lands Near Rampart, Alaska, Reserved for Agriculture Dept. Experiment Station	February 6, 1909
990	1024	Authorizing Reinstatement of Charles B. Brewer as Ship Drafts in the Bureau of Construction and Repairs, Navy Department	February 10, 1909
991	1025	Authorizing Promotion of James J. Smith to Day Inspector in the Customs Service at the Port of New York	February 10, 1909
992	1026	Enlarging Naval Reservation on Subic Bay, Olongapo, Philippine Islands	February 13, 1909
993	1027	Creating 6th Internal Revenue District in California by Removing Counties from 1st District	February 16, 1909
994	1028	Authorizing Reinstatement of R. Barnard Talcott as Assistant Engineer in Office of Supervising Architect of the Treasury	February 17, 1909
995	1029	Authorizing Promotion of John Hunter, Peter J. Kaster, and Joseph Stangle to Assistant Weigher in the Customs Service at the Port of New York	February 17, 1909
996	1030	Lands on Copper and Klutina Rivers, Alaska, Reserved for Joint Educational and Agricultural Experiment Purposes	February 24, 1909
997	1031	Authorizing Employment of F. N. Clark in Interstate Commerce Commission	February 25, 1909
998	1032	Establishing Seventeen Reservations as Preserves and Breeding Grounds for Native Birds	February 25, 1909
999	1033	Making Ten Employees of the Spanish Treaty Claims Commission Eligible for Transfer to Competitive Service	February 26, 1909
1000	1034	Making Five Employees of the Office of the Assistant Attorney-General Eligible for Transfer to Competitive Service	February 27, 1909
1001	1035	Authorizing Transfer of Roger H. Adams to Competitive Position in United States	February 27, 1909
1002	1036	Reserving Lands in Nome, Alaska, for Use by Army Signal Corps as Wireless Telegraph Station	February 27, 1909
1003	1037	Establishing Bering Sea Reservation as Preserve and Breeding Ground for Native Birds	February 27, 1909
1004	1038	Establishing Fire Island Reservation, Cook Inlet, Alaska, as Preserve and Breeding Ground for Alaska Moose	February 27, 1909
1005	1039	Establishing Tuxedni Reservation, Alaska, as Preserve and Breeding Ground for Native Birds	February 27, 1909
1006	1040	Establishing Saint Lazaria Reservation, Alaska, as Preserve and Breeding Ground for Native Birds	February 27, 1909
1007	1041	Establishing Yukon Delta Reservation, Alaska, as Preserve and Breeding Ground for Native Birds	February 27, 1909
1008	1042	Establishment of a Bird Reservation on the Island of Culebra, Porto Rico	February 27, 1909
1009	1043	Establishing Farallon Reservation, California, as Preserve and Breeding Ground for Native Birds	February 27, 1909
1010	1044	Establishing Pribilof Reservation, Alaska, as Preserve and Breeding Ground for Native Birds	February 27, 1909
1011	1045	Authorizing Appointment of James Mullenbach to Inspector in Immigration Service Without Examination	March 2, 1909
1012	1046	Amending Civil Service Rules to Make United States Marshal Office Deputies Competitive	March 2, 1909
1013	1047	Authorizing Appointment of John M. Longan to Clerical Position in Classified Service	March 2, 1909
1014	1048	Federal Employees in District of Columbia Excused From Work on Inauguration Day	March 2, 1909
1015	1049	Establishing Bogoslof Reservation, Alaska, as Preserve and Breeding Ground for Native Birds	March 2, 1909
1016	1050	Making Six Employees of the Department of Justice Eligible for Transfer to Competitive Service	March 3, 1909

== Presidential proclamations ==
=== 1903 ===
Relative No.	Absolute No.	Title/Description	Date signed
1	499	Establishment of the Logan Forest Reserve, Utah	May 29, 1903
2	500	Setting Apart Manti Forest Reserve, Utah	May 29, 1903
3	501	Consolidating Flathead with Lewis and Clarke Forest Reserve, Montana	June 9, 1903
4	502	Reserving Lands in Porto Rico for Naval Purposes	June 26, 1903
5	503	Reserving Lands in Porto Rico for Public Uses	June 30, 1903
6	504	Restoring to Public Domain Lands in Day County, Oklahoma	August 12, 1903
7	505	Setting Apart Pocatello Forest Reserve, Idaho	September 5, 1903
8	506	Convening Extraordinary Session of Congress	October 20, 1903
9	507	Setting Apart Aquarius Forest Reserve, Utah	October 24, 1903
10	508	Designating Thursday, November 26, 1903, As a Day of General Thanksgiving	October 31, 1903
11	509	Enlarging Boundaries of Payson Forest Reserve, Utah	November 5, 1903
12	510	Extending Benefits of Copyright Law to Citizens of Cuba	November 17, 1903
13	511	Setting Apart Highwood Forest Reserve, Montana	December 12, 1903
14	512	Merging Pine Mountain and Zaca Lake and Santa Ynez Forest Reserves Into Santa Barbara Forest Reserve, California	December 22, 1903
15	513	Taking Hawaii Light-House Establishment for Uses of United States	December 28, 1903

=== 1904 ===
Relative No.	Absolute No.	Title/Description	Date signed
16	514	Granting Fort Marcy Reservation lands to Santa Fe, New Mexico	January 5, 1904
17	515	Setting Apart Baker City Forest Reserve, Oregon	February 5, 1904
18	516	Declaration of Neutrality, War Between Japan and Russia	February 11, 1904
19	517	Setting Apart Cave Hills Forest Reserve, South Dakota	March 5, 1904
20	518	Setting Apart Slim Buttes Forest Reserve, South Dakota	March 5, 1904
21	519	Granting Fort Marcy Reservation Lands to Santa Fe, New Mexico	March 10, 1904
22	520	Granting Land to Lawton, Oklahoma	March 29, 1904
23	521	Restoring to Public Domain St. John's Mission School Land, South Dakota	March 20, 1904
24	522	Enlarging Boundaries of Fish Lake Forest Reserve, Utah	May 2, 1904
25	523	Reserving Lands for Townsite Entries, Hailey Land District, Idaho	May 2, 1904
26	524	Reducing Area of Yellowstone Forest Reserve, Wyoming and Montana	May 4, 1904
27	525	Setting Apart Grantsville Forest Reserve, Utah	May 7, 1904
28	526	Opening to Entry Lands Ceded on Rosebud Indian Reservation, South Dakota	May 13, 1904
29	527	Reducing Area of Battlement Mesa Forest Reserve, Colorado	May 16, 1904
30	528	Reducing Area of White River Forest Reserve, Colorado	May 21, 1904
31	529	Setting Apart Salt Lake Forest Reserves, Utah	May 26, 1904
32	530	Opening to Entry Lands Ceded on Devils Lake Indian Reservation, North Dakota	June 2, 1904
33	531	Reducing Area of Bitter Root Forest Reserve, Idaho and Montana	June 14, 1904
34	532	Granting Land to Woodward, Oklahoma	October 13, 1904
35	533	Designating Thursday, November 24, 1904, as a Day of General Thanksgiving	November 1, 1904
36	534	Setting Apart Warner Mountains Forest Reserve, California	November 29, 1904
37	535	Setting Apart Modoc Forest Reserve, California	November 29, 1904
38	536	Reducing Area of South Platte Forest Reserve, Colorado	December 6, 1904
39	537	Modifying Boundaries of Big Horn Forest Reserve, Wyoming	December 23, 1904

=== 1905 ===
Relative No.	Absolute No.	Title/Description	Date signed
40	538	Convening Extra Session of the Senate	February 23, 1905

=== 1906 ===
Relative No.	Absolute No.	Title/Description	Date signed
41	658	Setting Aside Devils Tower Monument, Wyoming	September 24, 1906

=== 1907 ===
Relative No.	Absolute No.	Title/Description	Date signed
42	740	Establishment of Chaco Canyon National Monument, New Mexico	March 11, 1907
43	758	Setting Apart As Public Lands A Strip Of Land On The Mexican Frontier	May 27, 1907
44	780	Declaring the State of Oklahoma's Admission to the Union	November 16, 1907

=== 1908 ===
Relative No.	Absolute No.	Title/Description	Date signed
45	804	Setting Aside Natural Bridges National Monument, Utah	April 16, 1908

=== 1909 ===
Relative No.	Absolute No.	Title/Description	Date signed
46	856	Convening Special Session of the Senate	February 27, 1909
47	857	Enlarging Boundaries of Arkansas National Forest, Arkansas	February 27, 1909
48	858	Enlarging Boundaries of Mono National Forest, California and Nevada	March 2, 1909
49	859	Including Part of the White Mountain Apache Indian Reservation in Sitgreaves National Forest, Arizona	March 2, 1909
50	860	Enlarging Boundaries of Lincoln National Forest, New Mexico	March 2, 1909
51	861	Enlarging Boundaries of Shasta National Forest, California	March 2, 1909
52	862	Including Part of the Mescalero Apache Indian Reservation in Alamo National Forest, New Mexico	March 2, 1909
53	863	Including Part of the Jicarilla Apache Indian Reservation in Carson National Forest, New Mexico	March 2, 1909
54	864	Setting Apart the Zuni National Forest, New Mexico and Arizona, and Including Parts of the Zuni and Navajo Indian Reservations	March 2, 1909
55	865	Including Part of the Hoopa Valley Indian Reservation in Trinity National Forest, California	March 2, 1909
56	866	Including Part of the White Mountain Apache Indian Reservation in Apache National Forest, Arizona	March 2, 1909
57	867	Transferring Part of Lassen National Forest, California, to Shasta National Forest, and Including Other Lands	March 2, 1909
58	868	Enlarging Boundaries of Plumas National Forest, California	March 2, 1909
59	869	Setting Aside Mount Olympus National Monument, Washington	March 2, 1909
60	870	Enlarging Boundaries of Tahoe National Forest, California and Nevada	March 2, 1909
61	871	Including Part of Tule River Indian Reservation in Sequoia National Forest, California	March 2, 1909
