= San Luis Obispo (disambiguation) =

San Luis Obispo is a city in California. It may also refer to:

- San Luis Obispo County, California
- Cal Poly San Luis Obispo
- Cerro San Luis Obispo
- Mission San Luis Obispo de Tolosa
- San Luis Obispo Creek
- San Luis Obispo National Forest

== See also ==
- St. Louis of Toulouse, namesake for the above
