= San Luis Obispo National Forest =

Former National Forest in the United States

San Luis Obispo National Forest was established as the San Luis Obispo Forest Reserve by the U.S. Forest Service in California on June 25, 1906, with 363,350 acres (1,470.4 km^{2}). It became a National Forest on March 4, 1907. On July 1, 1908, part of the forest was combined with Santa Barbara National Forest, the remainder was used to establish San Luis National Forest, and the name was discontinued.
