= Idaho National Forest =

Former national forest in Idaho

Idaho National Forest in Idaho was established by the U.S. Forest Service on July 1, 1908, with 1,293,280 acres (5,233.7 km^{2}) from the part of Payette National Forest. On April 1, 1944, the entire forest was combined with Weiser National Forest to establish the new Payette National Forest, and the name was discontinued.
