= Mono National Forest =

Former national forest in California and Nevada

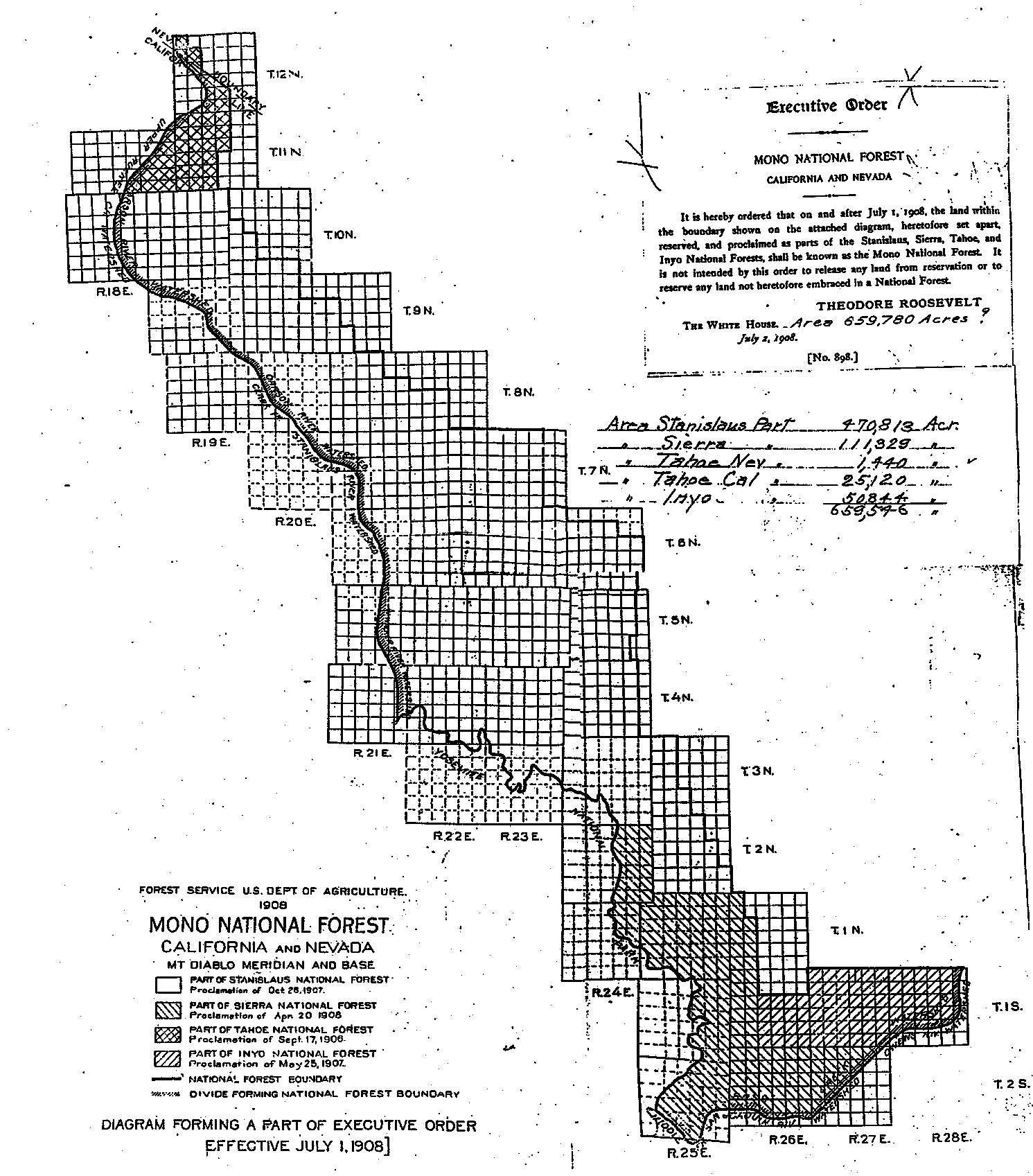
Map from Executive Order 898 in 1908

Mono National Forest was established by the U.S. Forest Service in California and Nevada on July 1, 1908 with 659,456 acres (2,668.72 km^{2}), almost all in California, from parts of Inyo, Toiyabe, Stanislaus and Sierra National Forests. On July 1, 1945 the entire forest was divided between Inyo and Toiyabe and the name was discontinued.
