= San Luis National Forest =

Former national forest in California

San Luis National Forest was established by the U.S. Forest Service in California on July 1, 1908 from part of San Luis Obispo National Forest with 355,990 acres (1,440.6 km^{2}). On July 1, 1910 the entire forest was combined with Santa Barbara National Forest and the name was discontinued.
