= Pine Mountain and Zaka Lake Forest Reserve =

Former national forest in California

Coordinates: 34.7775°N 120.0400°W

The Pine Mountain and Zaka Lake Forest Reserve was established by the United States General Land Office in California on March 2, 1892 with 1,644,594 acres (6,655.44 km^{2}) of the San Rafael Mountains in Santa Barbara County, California.

On December 22, 1903 the entire forest was combined with Santa Ynez Forest Reserve to create Santa Barbara Forest Reserve and the name was discontinued.

In the present day it is within the Los Padres National Forest.

== See also ==
- Big Pine Mountain
- San Rafael Mountains topics
- Zaca Fire
