= Santa Ynez Forest Reserve =

Former national forest in California

Coordinates: 34.5107°N 119.8124°W

The Santa Ynez Forest Reserve was established by the United States General Land Office in California on October 22, 1899 with 145,280 acres (587.9 km^{2}). On December 22, 1903 the entire forest was combined with Pine Mountain and Zaka Lake Forest Reserve to create the Santa Barbara Forest Reserve and the name was discontinued.
