= Fort Gibbon =

Coordinates: 65.1714°N 152.0532°W

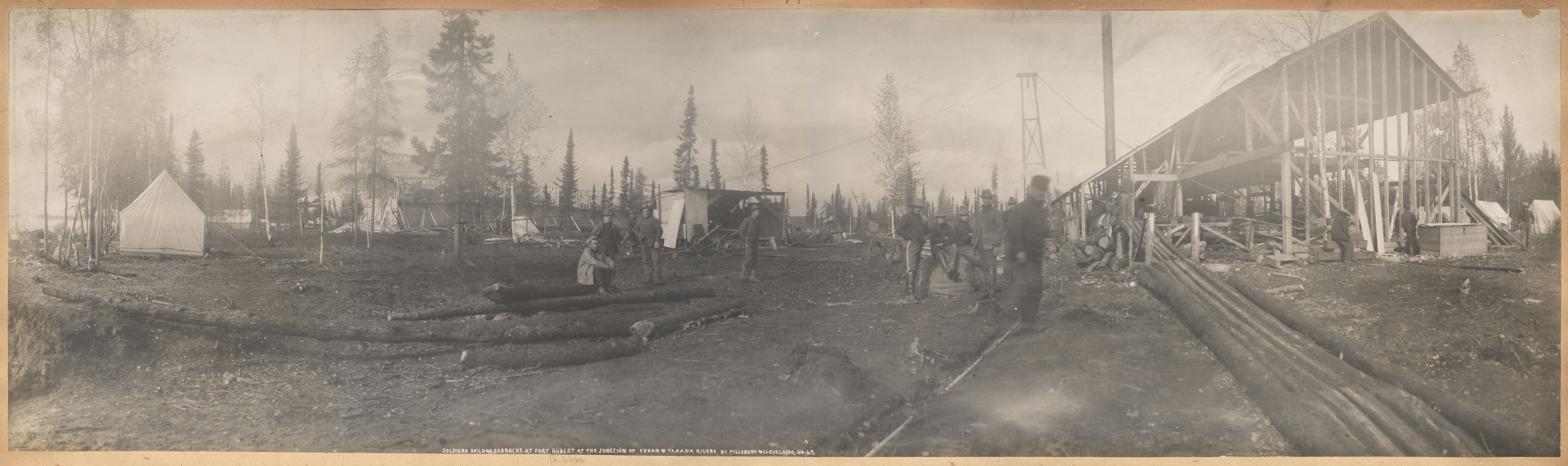
Fort Gibbon, circa 1889

Fort Gibbon was a U.S. Army base near Tanana, Alaska. It was active from 1899 to 1923.

== History ==
In response to reports of lawlessness in Alaska during the Klondike Gold Rush, six forts were built in the territory at the end of the 19th century. Three of the forts were built along the Yukon River: Fort Egbert, near the Canada–US border, Fort St. Michael, at the mouth of the Yukon River in Western Alaska, and Fort Gibbon, near Tanana, Alaska.

During the late 1800s, the large ships that travelled the Yukon River would unload cargo at Tanana and smaller vessels would carry the cargo up the Tanana River for delivery. Fort Gibbon was able to monitor trade along the Yukon and Tanana rivers and restore order among the gold rush miners and the Natives.

The necessity of maintaining order in the Territory decreased as the gold rush began to wind down. However a new purpose for Fort Gibbon developed with the creation of the Washington-Alaska Military Cable and Telegraph System (WAMCATS). Construction of the WAMCATS telegraph line began in 1903 and eventually connected the Territory of Alaska with the contiguous United States via an underwater cable. Shortly after completion of the telegraph line wireless radio began to augment and replace the telegraph lines. Fort Gibbon evolved into a wireless station. Units were rotated through garrison duty at Fort Gibbon. Elements of the 10th, 16th, 22nd and 30th Infantry Regiments served at Fort Gibbon in addition to other units. Companies C and D of the 22nd served at Fort Gibbon between 1908 and 1910. Fort Gibbon was closed in 1923.

== Demographics ==
Historical population
Census	Pop.	Note	%±
1920	181		—

Fort Gibbon appeared once on the 1920 U.S. Census as an unincorporated military installation. Owing to its deactivation in 1923, it was not reported again.
