= Weiser National Forest =

Former national forest in Idaho

Weiser National Forest in Idaho was established as the Weiser Forest Reserve by the U.S. Forest Service on May 25, 1905 with 324,964 acres (1,315.08 km^{2}). It became a National Forest on March 4, 1907. On April 1, 1944 the entire forest was combined with Idaho National Forest to re-establish Payette National Forest, and the name was discontinued.
