= Santa Barbara National Forest =

Former national forest in California

Santa Barbara National Forest was established as the Santa Barbara Forest Reserve by the United States General Land Office in California on December 22, 1903, with 1,838,323 acres (7,439.43 km^{2}) by consolidation of Pine Mountain and Zaka Lake and Santa Ynez Forest Reserves. It included areas of the San Rafael Mountains and Santa Ynez Mountains.

== U.S. National Forest ==
After the transfer of federal forests to the U.S. Forest Service in 1905, it became a U.S. National Forest on March 4, 1907. On July 1, 1910, San Luis National Forest was added. On August 18, 1919 Monterey National Forest was added. On December 3, 1936, the name was changed to Los Padres National Forest.

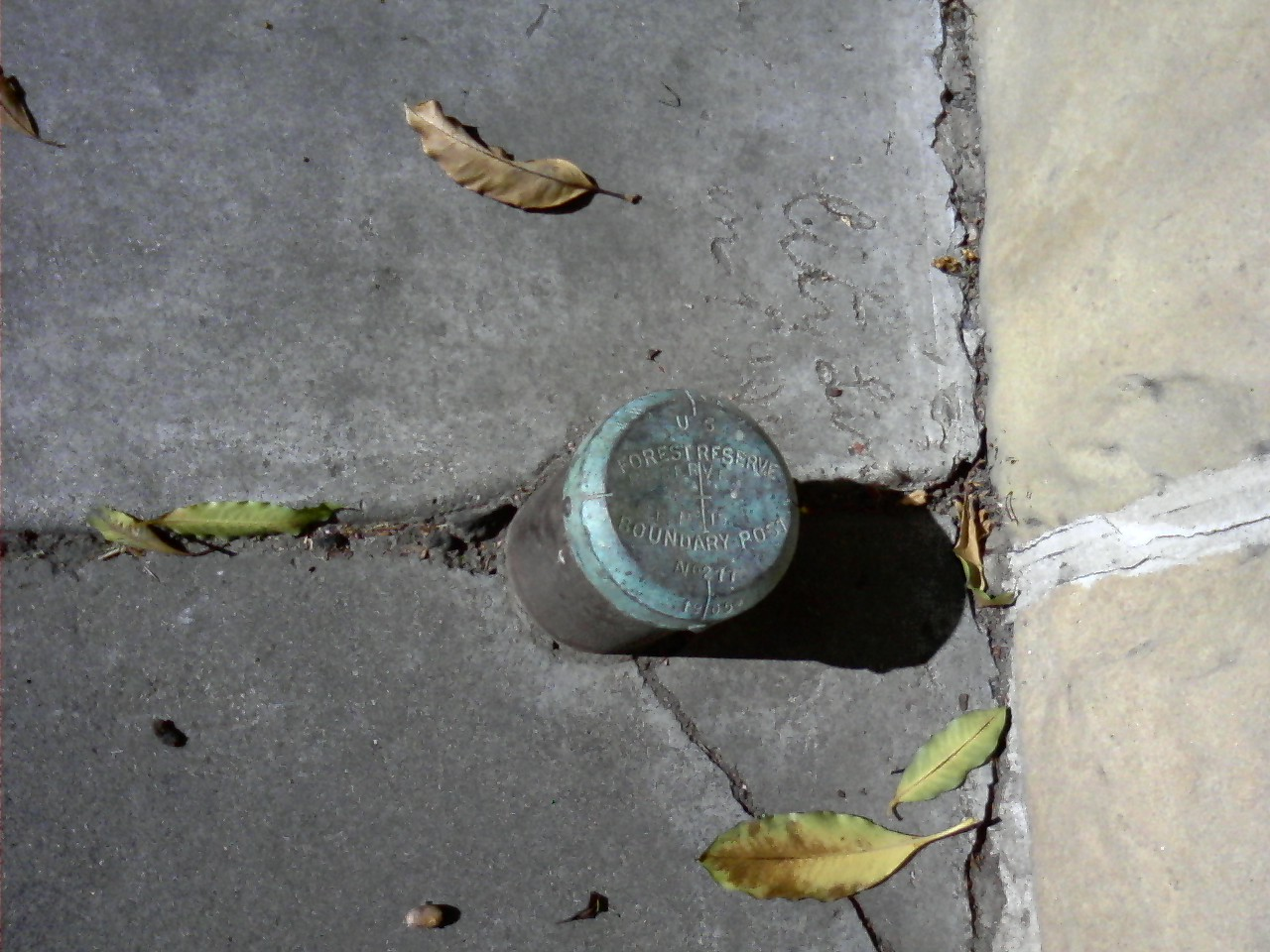
Boundary Post marker placed in 1905 near Garden and Mission Streets in Santa Barbara.
