= Timeline of Idaho history =

Coordinates: 44.3509°N 114.6130°W

This timeline is a chronology of significant events in the history of the U.S. State of Idaho and the historical area now occupied by the state.

2000s 1900s 1800s Statehood Territory 1700s 1600s 1500s Before 1492

== 2020s ==
Year	Date	Event
2020	November 3	In the 2020 General Election, Idaho voters elect four U.S. Presidential Electors for President Donald Trump, re-elect Jim Risch as junior U.S. Senator, and re-elect Russ Fulcher and Mike Simpson as U.S. Representatives. Republicans retain control of the Idaho Legislature.
2020	April 1	The 2020 United States census enumerates the population of the State of Idaho, estimated to be about 1,824,000.

== 2010s ==
Year	Date	Event
2019	January 7	Brad Little assumes office as the 33rd Governor of the State of Idaho.
2010	April 1	The 2010 United States census enumerates the population of the State of Idaho, later determined to be 1,567,582, an increase of 21.1% since the 2000 United States census. Idaho remains the 39th most populous of the 50 U.S. state.

== 2000s ==
Year	Date	Event
2009	March 30	U.S. President Barack Obama signs An Act to designate certain land as components of the National Wilderness Preservation System, to authorize certain programs and activities in the Department of the Interior and the Department of Agriculture, and for other purposes, creating the Pacific Northwest National Scenic Trail and the Ice Age Floods National Geologic Trail.
2009	January 3	Jim Risch assumes office as the junior United States senator for the State of Idaho.
2008	May 8	U.S. President George W. Bush signs An Act To modify the boundary of the Minidoka Internment National Monument, to establish the Minidoka National Historic Site, to authorize the Secretary of the Interior to convey certain land and improvements of the Gooding Division of the Minidoka Project, Idaho, and for other purposes, redesignating Minidoka Internment National Monument as Minidoka National Historic Site.
2007	January 1	Butch Otter assumes office as the 32nd Governor of the State of Idaho.
2006	May 26	Lieutenant Governor Jim Risch assumes office as the 31st Governor of the State of Idaho upon the resignation of Governor Kempthorne.
2002	August 21	U.S. President George W. Bush signs An Act To redesignate certain lands within the Craters of the Moon National Monument, and for other purposes, creating Craters of the Moon National Preserve.
2001	January 17	U.S. President Bill Clinton issues a public land order creating Minidoka Internment National Monument.
2000	April 1	The 2000 United States census enumerates the population of the State of Idaho, later determined to be 1,293,953, an increase of 28.5% since the 1990 United States census. Idaho becomes the 39th most populous of the 50 U.S. states.

== 1990s ==
Year	Date	Event
1999	January 4	Dirk Kempthorne assumes office as the 30th Governor of the State of Idaho.
1999	January 3	Mike Crapo assumes office as the junior United States senator for the State of Idaho.
1995	January 2	Phil Batt assumes office as the 29th Governor of the State of Idaho.
1990	April 1	The 1990 United States census enumerates the population of the State of Idaho, later determined to be 1,006,749, an increase of 6.7% since the 1980 United States census. Idaho becomes the 42nd most populous of the 50 U.S. states and loses its 2nd Congressional District.

== 1980s ==
Year	Date	Event
1987	January 5	Cecil Andrus assumes office as the 28th Governor of the State of Idaho.
1988	November 10	U.S. President Ronald Reagan signs An Act To provide for the designation and conservation of certain lands in the States of Arizona and Idaho, and for other purposes, creating City of Rocks National Reserve and Hagerman Fossil Beds National Monument.
1980	April 1	The 1980 United States census enumerates the population of the State of Idaho, later determined to be 943,935, an increase of 32.5% since the 1970 United States census. Idaho becomes the 41st most populous of the 50 U.S. states.

== 1970s ==
Year	Date	Event
1978	November 10	U.S. President Jimmy Carter signs the National Parks and Recreation Act of 1978 authorizing the Lewis and Clark National Historic Trail and the Continental Divide National Scenic Trail.
1978	October 9	The United Nations Educational, Scientific and Cultural Organization (UNESCO) designates Yellowstone National Park as one of the first 12 World Heritage Sites.
1977	January 23	Cecil Andrus assumes office as the 42nd United States Secretary of the Interior.
1977	January 23	Lieutenant Governor John V. Evans assumes office as the 27th Governor of the State of Idaho upon the resignation of Governor Andrus
1976	July 4	The State of Idaho celebrates the Bicentennial of the United States of America.
1971	January 4	Cecil Andrus assumes office as the 26th Governor of the State of Idaho.
1970	April 1	The 1970 United States census enumerates the population of the State of Idaho, later determined to be 712,567, an increase of 6.8% since the 1960 United States census. Idaho remains the 42nd most populous of the 50 U.S. states.

== 1960s ==
Year	Date	Event
1968	December 2	U.S. President Lyndon B. Johnson signs An Act to establish a national trails system, and for other purposes, creating the National Trails System.
1967	January 2	Don Samuelson assumes office as the 25th Governor of the State of Idaho.
1965	May 15	U.S. President Lyndon B. Johnson signs An Act to authorize the Secretary of the Interior to designate the Nez Perce National historical Park in the State of Idaho, and for other purposes, creating Nez Perce National Historical Park.
1960	April 1	The 1960 United States census enumerates the population of the State of Idaho, later determined to be 667,191, an increase of 13.3% since the 1950 United States census. Idaho becomes the 42nd most populous of the 50 U.S. states.

== 1950s ==
Year	Date	Event
1955	January 3	Robert E. Smylie assumes office as the 24th Governor of the State of Idaho.
1954	May 19	U.S. President Dwight D. Eisenhower issues Public Land Order 965 splitting Cabinet National Forest among Kaniksu National Forest, Kootenai National Forest, and Lolo National Forest.
1953	October 23	U.S. President Dwight D. Eisenhower issues Public Land Order 923 splitting Minidoka National Forest between Sawtooth National Forest and Salmon National Forest.
1951	January 1	Len Jordan assumes office as the 23rd Governor of the State of Idaho.
1950	April 1	The 1950 United States census enumerates the population of the State of Idaho, later determined to be 588,637, an increase of 12.1% since the 1940 United States census. Idaho becomes the 43rd most populous of the 48 U.S. states.

== 1940s ==
Year	Date	Event
1947	January 6	C.A. Robins assumes office as the 22nd Governor of the State of Idaho.
1945	November 17	Lieutenant Governor Arnold Williams assumes office as the 21st Governor of the State of Idaho upon the resignation of Governor Gossett.
1945	September 2	World War II ends as the Empire of Japan formally surrenders.
1945	May 8	The war in Europe ends as the Greater German Empire formally surrenders.
1945	January 1	Charles C. Gossett assumes office as the 20th Governor of the State of Idaho.
1943	January 4	C.A. Bottolfsen assumes office as the 19th Governor of the State of Idaho.
1941	December 11	The United States declares war on the German Reich and the Italian Empire.
1941	December 8	The United States declares war on the Empire of Japan and enters World War II.
1941	January 6	Chase A. Clark assumes office as the 18th Governor of the State of Idaho.
1940	April 1	The 1940 United States census enumerates the population of the State of Idaho, later determined to be 524,873, an increase of 17.9% since the 1930 United States census. Idaho remains the 42nd most populous of the 48 U.S. states.

== 1930s ==
Year	Date	Event
1939	January 2	C.A. Bottolfsen assumes office as the 17th Governor of the State of Idaho.
1938	October 8	U.S. President Franklin D. Roosevelt issues Executive Order 7986 splitting Lemhi National Forest between Challis National Forest and Salmon National Forest.
1937	July 22	U.S. President Franklin D. Roosevelt signs An Act to create the Farmers' Home Corporation, to promote more secure occupancy of farms and farm homes, to correct the economic instability resulting from some present forms of farm tenancy, and for other purposes, also known as the Bankhead-Jones Farm Tenant Act.
1937	January 4	Barzilla W. Clark assumes office as the 16th Governor of the State of Idaho.
1934	October 29	U.S. President Franklin D. Roosevelt issues Executive Order 6889 splitting Selway National Forest among Bitterroot National Forest, Clearwater National Forest, Nezperce National Forest, and Kaniksu National Forest.
1933	September 30	U.S. President Franklin D. Roosevelt issues Executive Order 6303 merging Pend Oreille National Forest into Kaniksu National Forest.
1931	January 5	C. Ben Ross assumes office as the 15th Governor of the State of Idaho.
1930	April 1	The 1930 United States census enumerates the population of the State of Idaho, later determined to be 445,032, an increase of 3.0% since the 1920 United States census. Idaho remains the 42nd most populous of the 48 U.S. states.

== 1920s ==
Year	Date	Event
1927	January 3	H.C. Baldridge assumes office as the 14th Governor of the State of Idaho.
1924	June 2	U.S. President Calvin Coolidge signs An Act To authorize the Secretary of the Interior to issue certificates of citizenship to Indians, also known as the Indian Citizenship Act of 1924, finally granting full United States Citizenship to all Native Americans born in the United States.
1924	May 2	U.S. President Calvin Coolidge issues an executive order creating Craters of the Moon National Monument.
1923	January 1	Charles C. Moore assumes office as the 13th Governor of the State of Idaho.
1920	April 1	The 1920 United States census enumerates the population of the State of Idaho, later determined to be 431,866, an increase of 32.6% since the 1910 United States census. Idaho becomes the 42nd most populous of the 48 U.S. states.

== 1910s ==
Year	Date	Event
1919	February 11	The State of Idaho creates Caribou County from a portion of Bannock County.
1919	February 8	The State of Idaho creates Jerome County from portions of Gooding County and Lincoln County.
1919	February 1	The State of Idaho creates Clark County from a portion of Fremont County.
1919	January 6	D.W. Davis assumes office as the 12th Governor of the State of Idaho.
1918	November 11	An armistice halts the Great War.
1917	April 6	The United States declares war on the German Empire and enters the Great War.
1917	February 26	The State of Idaho creates Valley County from portions of Boise County and Idaho County.
1917	February 26	The State of Idaho creates Payette County from a portion of Canyon County.
1917	February 6	The State of Idaho creates Camas County from a portion of Blaine County.
1917	February 6	The State of Idaho creates Butte County from portions of Bingham County, Blaine County, and Jefferson County.
1916	August 25	U.S. President Woodrow Wilson signs An Act To establish a National Park Service, and for other purposes.
1915	April 21	U.S. President Woodrow Wilson issues Executive Order 2179 merging Pocatello National Forest into Cache National Forest.
1915	March 15	The State of Idaho creates Gem County from portions of Boise County and Canyon County.
1915	January 23	The State of Idaho creates Teton County from portions of Bingham County, Fremont County, and Madison County.
1915	January 23	The State of Idaho creates Boundary County from a portion of Bonner County.
1915	January 23	The State of Idaho creates Benewah County from a portion of Kootenai County.
1915	January 4	Moses Alexander assumes office as the 11th Governor of the State of Idaho.
1913	February 18	The State of Idaho creates Madison County from a portion of Fremont County.
1913	February 18	The State of Idaho creates Jefferson County from a portion of Fremont County.
1913	January 30	The State of Idaho creates Power County from portions of Bingham County, Blaine County, and Oneida County.
1913	January 28	The State of Idaho creates Minidoka County from a portion of Lincoln County.
1913	January 28	The State of Idaho creates Gooding County from a portion of Lincoln County.
1913	January 20	The State of Idaho creates Franklin County from a portion of Oneida County.
1913	January 6	John M. Haines assumes office as the tenth Governor of the State of Idaho.
1911	June 29	U.S. President William Howard Taft issues Proclamation 1143 creating St. Joe National Forest.
1911	June 29	U.S. President William Howard Taft issues Proclamation 1141 merging Clearwater National Forest into Selway National Forest.
1911	June 29	U.S. President William Howard Taft issues Proclamation 1140 creating Selway National Forest.
1911	March 3	The State of Idaho creates Lewis County from a portion of Nez Perce County.
1911	March 3	The State of Idaho creates Adams County from a portion of Washington County.
1911	February 27	The State of Idaho creates Clearwater County from a portion of Nez Perce County.
1911	February 7	The State of Idaho creates Bonneville County from a portion of Bingham County.
1911	January 2	James H. Hawley assumes office as the ninth Governor of the State of Idaho.
1910	June 28	U.S. President William Howard Taft issues Proclamation 1053 creating Palisade National Forest.
1910	May 6	U.S. President William Howard Taft issues Proclamation 1025 changing the name of Pend d'Oreille National Forest to Pend Oreille National Forest.
1910	April 1	The 1910 United States census enumerates the population of the State of Idaho, later determined to be 325,594, an increase of 101% since the 1900 United States census. Idaho becomes the 43rd most populous of the 46 U.S. states and gains a second Congressional seat.

== 1900s ==
Year	Date	Event
1909	January 4	James H. Brady assumes office as the eighth Governor of the State of Idaho.
1908	July 2	U.S. President Theodore Roosevelt issues Executive Order 908 merging Cassia National Forest into the new Minidoka National Forest.
1908	July 1	U.S. President Theodore Roosevelt issues Executive Order 883 changing the name of Bitter Root National Forest to Bitterroot National Forest.
1908	July 1	U.S. President Theodore Roosevelt issues Executive Order 871 merging Henrys Lake National Forest into the new Targhee National Forest.
1908	June 26	U.S. President Theodore Roosevelt issues Executive Order 857 creating Boise National Forest.
1908	June 26	U.S. President Theodore Roosevelt issues Executive Order 855 creating Idaho National Forest.
1908	June 26	U.S. President Theodore Roosevelt issues Executive Order 854 creating Nezperce National Forest.
1908	June 26	U.S. President Theodore Roosevelt issues Executive Order 845 creating Kaniksu National Forest.
1908	June 26	U.S. President Theodore Roosevelt issues Executive Order 844 merging Priest River National Forest into the new Pend d'Oreille National Forest.
1908	June 26	U.S. President Theodore Roosevelt issues Executive Order 843 merging Palouse National Forest into Coeur d'Alène National Forest and changing the name to Coeur d'Alene National Forest.
1908	June 26	U.S. President Theodore Roosevelt issues Executive Order 842 creating Clearwater National Forest.
1908	June 26	U.S. President Theodore Roosevelt issues Executive Order 841 changing the name of Salmon River National Forest to Salmon National Forest.
1908	June 25	U.S. President Theodore Roosevelt issues Executive Order 840 creating Challis National Forest.
1908	May 26	U.S. President Theodore Roosevelt issues Executive Order 802 merging Bear River National Forest into the new Cache National Forest.
1908	May 26	U.S. President Theodore Roosevelt issues Executive Order 801 merging Port Neuf National Forest into Pocatello National Forest.
1907	March 2	U.S. President Theodore Roosevelt issues a proclamation creating the Cabinet Forest Reserve.
1907	March 2	U.S. President Theodore Roosevelt issues a proclamation creating the Palouse Forest Reserve.
1907	March 2	U.S. President Theodore Roosevelt issues a proclamation creating the Port Neuf Forest Reserve.
1907	February 21	The State of Idaho creates Twin Falls County from a portion of Cassia County.
1907	February 21	The State of Idaho creates Bonner County from a portion of Kootenai County.
1907	January 15	U.S. President Theodore Roosevelt issues a proclamation creating the Caribou Forest Reserve.
1906	November 6	U.S. President Theodore Roosevelt issues a proclamation creating the Coeur d'Alène Forest Reserve.
1906	November 5	U.S. President Theodore Roosevelt issues a proclamation creating the Salmon River Forest Reserve.
1906	November 5	U.S. President Theodore Roosevelt issues a proclamation creating the Lemhi Forest Reserve.
1906	November 5	U.S. President Theodore Roosevelt issues a proclamation creating the Raft River Forest Reserve.
1906	June 8	U.S. President Theodore Roosevelt signs An Act For the preservation of American antiquities, also known as the Antiquities Act of 1906, giving the President of the United States the authority to create national monuments on federal lands to protect significant natural, cultural, or scientific features.
1905	June 12	U.S. President Theodore Roosevelt issues a proclamation creating the Cassia Forest Reserve.
1905	June 3	U.S. President Theodore Roosevelt issues a proclamation creating the Payette Forest Reserve.
1905	May 29	U.S. President Theodore Roosevelt issues a proclamation creating the Sawtooth Forest Reserve.
1905	May 25	U.S. President Theodore Roosevelt issues a proclamation creating the Weiser Forest Reserve.
1905	May 23	U.S. President Theodore Roosevelt issues a proclamation creating the Henrys Lake Forest Reserve.
1905	January 2	Frank R. Gooding assumes office as the seventh Governor of the State of Idaho.
1903	September 6	U.S. President Theodore Roosevelt issues Proclamation 7 creating the Pocatello Forest Reserve.
1903	January 5	John T. Morrison assumes office as the sixth Governor of the State of Idaho.
1901	January 7	Frank W. Hunt assumes office as the fifth Governor of the State of Idaho.
1900	April 1	The 1900 United States census enumerates the population of the State of Idaho, later determined to be 161,772, an increase of 83% since the 1890 United States census. Idaho becomes the 43rd most populous of the 45 U.S. states.

== 1890s ==
Year	Date	Event
1898	December 10	The United States of America and the Kingdom of Spain sign the Treaty of Paris of 1898 to end the Spanish–American War.
1898	August 12	The United States of America and the Kingdom of Spain sign a Protocol of Peace.
1898	April 23	The Kingdom of Spain declares war on the United States of America. The United States declares war on Spain two days later.
1897	February 22	U.S. President Grover Cleveland issues Proclamation 26 creating the Priest River Forest Reserve.
1897	February 22	U.S. President Grover Cleveland issues Proclamation 23 creating the Bitter Root Forest Reserve.
1897	January 4	Frank Steunenberg assumes office as the fourth Governor of the State of Idaho.
1895	March 18	The State of Idaho creates Lincoln County from a portion of Blaine County.
1895	March 5	The State of Idaho creates Blaine County by combining Alturas County and Logan County.
1893	March 6	The State of Idaho creates Bannock County from a portion of Bingham County.
1893	March 4	The State of Idaho creates Fremont County from a portion of Bingham County.
1893	January 2	William J. McConnell assumes office as the third Governor of the State of Idaho.
1891	March 7	The State of Idaho creates Canyon County from a portion of Ada County.
1891	March 3	U.S. President Benjamin Harrison signs An act to repeal timber-culture laws, and for other purposes, also known as the Forest Reserve Act of 1891, giving the President of the United States the authority to create protected national forests on federal lands.
1890	December 18	Lieutenant Governor N.B. Willey assumes office as the second Governor of the State of Idaho upon the resignation of Governor Shoup.
1890	October 1	Territorial Governor George L. Shoup assumes office as the first Governor of the State of Idaho.
1890	July 3	U.S. President Benjamin Harrison signs An act to provide for the admission of the State of Idaho into the Union. The Territory of Idaho becomes the State of Idaho, the 43rd U.S. state.
1890	April 1	The 1890 United States census enumerates the population of the State of Idaho, later determined to be 88,548, an increase of NN% since the 1880 United States census. Idaho will become the 42nd most populous of the 43 U.S. states.

== 1880s ==
Year	Date	Event
1889	April 30	U.S. President Benjamin Harrison appoints George L. Shoup as the (last) Governor of the Territory of Idaho.
1889	February 7	The Territory of Idaho creates Logan County from a portion of Alturas County.
1889	February 7	The Territory of Idaho creates Elmore County from a portion of Alturas County.
1888	January 13	The Territory of Idaho creates Latah County from a portion of Nez Perce County.
1885	October 10	U.S. President Grover Cleveland appoints Edward A. Stevenson as the Governor of the Territory of Idaho.
1885	January 13	The Territory of Idaho creates Bingham County from a portion of Oneida County.
1884	March 26	U.S. President Chester A. Arthur appoints William M. Bunn as the Governor of the Territory of Idaho.
1883	March 5	U.S. President Chester A. Arthur appoints John N. Irwin as the Governor of the Territory of Idaho.
1881	January 8	The Territory of Idaho creates Custer County from portions of Alturas County and Lemhi County.
1880	July 12	U.S. President Rutherford B. Hayes appoints John Baldwin Neil as the Governor of the Territory of Idaho.
1880	April 1	The 1880 United States census enumerates the population of the Territory of Idaho, later determined to be 32,610, an increase of NN% since the 1880 United States census. Idaho becomes the seventh most populous of the eight U.S. territories.

== 1870s ==
Year	Date	Event
1869	February 20	The Territory of Idaho creates Washington County from a portion of Ada County.
1869	February 20	The Territory of Idaho creates Cassia County from a portion of Owyhee County.
1876	July 24	U.S. President Ulysses S. Grant appoints Mason Brayman as the Governor of the Territory of Idaho.
1876	July 4	The Territory of Idaho celebrates the Centennial of the United States of America while still reeling from the Battle of the Little Bighorn.
1876	June 26	The 7th Cavalry Regiment under the command of Lieutenant Colonel George Armstrong Custer are defeated at the Battle of the Little Bighorn by a force of Lakota, Northern Cheyenne, and Arapaho warriors.
1876	April	U.S. President Ulysses S. Grant appoints David P. Thompson as the Governor of the Territory of Idaho.
1875	January 5	The Territory of Idaho creates Bear Lake County from a portion of Oneida County.
1872	March 1	U.S. President Ulysses S. Grant signs An Act to set apart a certain tract of land lying near the headwaters of the Yellowstone River as a public park, creating Yellowstone National Park, the world's first national park.
1871	December	U.S. President Ulysses S. Grant appoints Thomas W. Bennett as the Governor of the Territory of Idaho.
1871	April 19	U.S. President Ulysses S. Grant appoints David W. Ballard as the Governor of the Territory of Idaho.
1870	April 1	The 1870 United States census enumerates the population of the Territory of Idaho, later determined to be 14,999. Idaho is the seventh most populous of the nine U.S. territories.

== 1860s ==
Year	Date	Event
1869	January 9	The Territory of Idaho creates Lemhi County from a portion of Idaho County.
1866	June 14	U.S. President Andrew Johnson appoints David W. Ballard as the third Governor of the Territory of Idaho.
1865	May 9	U.S. President Andrew Johnson proclaims the end of the American Civil War.
1865	April 1	U.S. Vice President Andrew Johnson assumes office as the 17th President of the United States upon the assassination of Abraham Lincoln.
1864	December 22	The Territory of Idaho creates Kootenai County from a portion of Nez Perce County.
1864	December 22	The Territory of Idaho creates Ada County from a portion of Boise County.
1864	August 1	U.S. President Abraham Lincoln appoints Caleb Lyon as the second Governor of the Territory of Idaho.
1864	February 4	The Territory of Idaho creates five more original counties: Alturas County, Boise County, Idaho County, Nez Perce County, and Shoshone County.
1864	January 22	The Territory of Idaho creates Oneida County.
1863	December 31	The Territory of Idaho creates Owyhee County.
1863	July 10	U.S. President Abraham Lincoln appoints William H. Wallace as the first Governor of the Territory of Idaho.
1863	March 3	U.S. President Abraham Lincoln signs An Act to provide a temporary Government for the Territory of Idaho. The Territory of Idaho includes all of the future states of Idaho and Montana plus the northern portion of the future state of Wyoming.
1861	April 12	The American Civil War begins with the Battle of Fort Sumter.
1861	March 4	Abraham Lincoln assumes office as the 16th President of the United States.
1861	February 8	The seven secessionist slave states create the Confederate States of America.
1860	November 6	Abraham Lincoln is elected President of the United States. Seven slave states will secede from the United States of America before February 8, 1861.

== 1850s ==
Year	Date	Event
1853	March 2	U.S. President Millard Fillmore signs An Act to establish the Territorial Government of Washington. The Territory of Washington includes all of the future State of Idaho.
1851	April 5	Governor Brigham Young dissolves the self-proclaimed State of Deseret.

== 1840s ==
Year	Date	Event
1849	March 12	The Mormon settlers of the Great Salt Lake Valley create the Provisional Government of the State of Deseret and elect Brigham Young as the first (and only) Governor. The proposed state includes the entire Great Basin and the entire drainage basin of the Colorado River within the United States. Although the proposed State of Deseret includes the southern portion of the future State of Idaho, it has no actual presence in the region.
1848	August 14	U.S. President James K. Polk signs An Act to Establish the Territorial Government of Oregon. The Territory of Oregon includes the portion of the future State of Idaho lying west of the Continental Divide of the Americas. The rest of the future state remains unorganized United States territory.
1848	February 2	The United States of America and United Mexican States sign the Treaty of Guadalupe Hidalgo to end the Mexican–American War.
1846	July 17	The Oregon Treaty between the United States of America and the United Kingdom of Great Britain and Ireland takes effect. The 49th parallel north is set as the international border from the Strait of Georgia to the Lake of the Woods. All land in the future State of Idaho becomes unorganized United States territory.
1846	May 13	The United States declares war on the Mexican Republic.

== 1830s ==
Year	Date	Event

== 1820s ==
Year	Date	Event

== 1810s ==
Year	Date	Event
1819	January 30	The Treaty of 1818 between the United States of America and the United Kingdom of Great Britain and Ireland takes effect. The treaty calls for the joint occupation of the Oregon Country west of the Continental Divide of the Americas, and the 49th parallel north as the international border east of the Continental Divide to the Lake of the Woods. The Continental Divide separates the future State of Idaho between the Oregon Country and the Territory of Missouri.
1814		William Clark publishes A Map of Lewis and Clark's Track Across the Western Portion of North America.

== 1800s ==
Year	Date	Event
1806	September 23	The Lewis and Clark Expedition arrives in St. Louis in the Territory of Louisiana (the future State of Missouri).
1806	August 11	The Lewis and Clark Expedition reunites at the confluence of the Yellowstone River with the Missouri River.
1806	July 7	William Clark and the other members of the Lewis and Clark Expedition cross the Continental Divide of the Americas at the saddle now known as Big Hole Pass.
1806	July 7	Meriwether Lewis and nine other members of the Lewis and Clark Expedition cross the Continental Divide of the Americas at the saddle now known as Lewis and Clark Pass.
1806	July 3	On their return east, Meriwether Lewis and William Clark decide to split their expedition to search for a shorter route to the Missouri River.
1806	March 22	The Lewis and Clark Expedition depart Fort Clatsop and begin their voyage back to the United States.
1805	December 7	The Lewis and Clark Expedition arrive at the site of their winter encampment on the south side of the Columbia River and begin the construction of Fort Clatsop.
1805	August 12	Meriwether Lewis and three other members of the Lewis and Clark Expedition cross the Continental Divide of the Americas at the saddle now known as Lemhi Pass and enter territory claimed by Native Americans, the Kingdom of Spain, the United Kingdom of Great Britain and Ireland, and the Russian Empire. The rest of the expedition will follow.
1804	May 21	The Lewis and Clark Expedition departs St. Charles in the District of Louisiana (the future State of Missouri) and begins its voyage up the Missouri River.

== 1790s ==
Year	Date	Event

== 1780s ==
Year	Date	Event
1783	September 3	The Treaty of Paris is signed in Paris by representatives of King George III of Great Britain and representatives of the United States of America. The treaty affirms the independence of the United States and sets the Mississippi River as its western boundary.

== 1770s ==
Year	Date	Event
1776	July 4	Representatives of the thirteen United States of America sign the Declaration of Independence from the Kingdom of Great Britain.

== 1690s ==
Year	Date	Event

== 1590s ==
Year	Date	Event

== 1510s ==
Year	Date	Event
1513	September 29	Spanish conquistador Vasco Núñez de Balboa crosses the Isthmus of Panama and arrives on the shore of a sea that he names Mar del Sur (the South Sea, later named the Pacific Ocean). He claims the sea and all adjacent lands for the Queen of Castile. This includes all of the future State of Idaho.

== 1490s ==
Year	Date	Event
1493	May 5	Pope Alexander VI (born Roderic de Borja in Valencia) issues the papal bull Inter caetera which splits the non-Christian world into two halves. The eastern half goes to the King of Portugal for his exploration, conquest, conversion, and exploitation. The western half (including all of North America) goes to the Queen of Castile and the King of Aragon for their exploration, conquest, conversion, and exploitation. The indigenous peoples of the Americas have no idea that any of these people exist.
1492	October 12	Genoese seaman Cristòffa Cómbo (Christopher Columbus) leading an expedition for Queen Isabella I of Castile lands on the Lucayan island of Guanahani that he renames San Salvador. This begins the Spanish conquest of the Americas.

== Before 1492 ==
Era	Event
c. 12,000 BCE	During a centuries long period of warming, ice-age Paleoamericans from Beringia begin using the ice-free corridor east of the Rocky Mountains to migrate throughout the Americas.

2000s 1900s 1800s Statehood Territory 1700s 1600s 1500s Before 1492

== See also ==
- History of Idaho
  - Bibliography of Idaho history
    - Bibliography of Yellowstone National Park
  - Territorial evolution of Idaho
    - Territory of Idaho
    - State of Idaho
- Index of Idaho-related articles
- List of cities in Idaho
- List of counties in Idaho
- List of ghost towns in Idaho
- List of governors of Idaho
- List of Idaho state legislatures
- List of places in Idaho
- Outline of Idaho
