= Palouse National Forest =

Former national forest in Idaho

The Palouse Forest Reserve and after March 4, 1907, the Palouse National Forest was established by Presidential Proclamation (34 U.S. Statutes at Large 3293) on March 2, 1907 and was one of President Theodore Roosevelt's Midnight forests, created before the federal law banning new forest reserves in six western states, including Idaho, became effective.

The conventional wisdom has the name 'palouse' being derived from the French term for the large treeless plain region in eastern Washington stretching into Idaho: the Palouse, a word meaning grassy spot or place. However, Boone says that the name could originate from the name of a major village of Palouse Indians, Palus, located at the confluence of the Palouse and Snake Rivers. 'Palus' is the Sachapin Indian word for "something sticking down in the water," in this case the something was a large rock, thought to be a beaver's heart, and which had an important religious significance for the Palouse Indians.

The Palouse National Forest had its administrative headquarters in the town of Wallace, Idaho for its 15-month existence and was administered by the U.S. Forest Service with 194,404 acres (786.73 km^{2}). With the issuance of Executive Order 843 by President Roosevelt on June 26, 1908, with an effective date of July 1, 1908, the entire forest was absorbed by the Coeur d'Alene National Forest and the area ceased to be an independently administered national forest. The lands of the former Palouse National Forest were then administered as part of the Coeur d'Alene National Forest for three years before being combined with other lands to establish the St. Joe National Forest on July 1, 1911. The area of the former Palouse National Forest formed the western portion of the St. Joe National Forest. Once transferred in 1911, the area of the Palouse National Forest became the Palouse Ranger District of the St. Joe National Forest and is still considered part of the St. Joe National Forest. However, it has been administered by the Clearwater National Forest since the 1973 administrative merger of the Kaniksu National Forest, Coeur d'Alene, and St. Joe National Forests into the Idaho Panhandle National Forests.
