= Pend Oreille National Forest =

Former national forest of Idaho (1910–1933)

Pend Oreille National Forest was established by the U.S. Forest Service in Idaho on May 6, 1910 with 911,764 acres (3,689.78 km^{2}) by the renaming of Pend d'Oreille National Forest, which in turn had been established on July 1, 1908 with 913,364 acres (3,696.25 km^{2}) from Cabinet, Coeur d'Alene, Kootenai and Priest River National Forests. On September 30, 1933 most of the forest was transferred to Kaniksu National Forest and the remainder was transferred to Coeur d'Alene. The name was discontinued.
