= List of Idaho state legislatures =

The legislature of the U.S. state of Idaho has convened many times since statehood became effective on July 3, 1890.

== Legislatures ==
Number	Name	Convened	Adjourned	# of legislative days	# of bills introduced	# of bills passed	Last election
1	1st Idaho Legislature	December 8, 1890	March 14, 1891	82			
2	2nd Idaho Legislature	January 2, 1893	March 6, 1893	64			
3	3rd Idaho Legislature	January 7, 1895	March 9, 1895	62			
4	4th Idaho Legislature	January 4, 1897	March 8, 1897	64			
5	5th Idaho Legislature	January 2, 1899	March 7, 1899	65			
6	6th Idaho Legislature	January 7, 1901	March 12, 1901	65			
7	7th Idaho Legislature	January 5, 1903	March 7, 1903	62			
8	8th Idaho Legislature	January 2, 1905	March 4, 1905	62			
9	9th Idaho Legislature	January 7, 1907	March 8, 1907	61			
10	10th Idaho Legislature	January 4, 1909	March 6, 1909	62			
11	11th Idaho Legislature	January 2, 1911	March 4, 1911	62			
11	11th Idaho Legislature	January 15, 1912	January 31, 1912	17			
12	12th Idaho Legislature	January 6, 1913	March 8, 1913	62			
13	13th Idaho Legislature	January 4, 1915	March 8, 1915	64			
14	14th Idaho Legislature	January 8, 1917	March 10, 1917	62			
15	15th Idaho Legislature	January 6, 1919	March 8, 1919	62			
16	16th Idaho Legislature	January 3, 1921	March 5, 1921	62			
17	17th Idaho Legislature	January 8, 1923	March 9, 1923	61			
18	18th Idaho Legislature	January 5, 1925	March 5, 1925	60			
19	19th Idaho Legislature	January 3, 1927	March 3, 1927	60			
20	20th Idaho Legislature	January 7, 1929	March 7, 1929	60			
20	20th Idaho Legislature	February 24, 1930	February 25, 1930	2			
21	21st Idaho Legislature	January 5, 1931	March 5, 1931	60			
21	21st Idaho Legislature	March 6, 1931	March 13, 1931	8			
22	22nd Idaho Legislature	January 2, 1933	March 1, 1933	59			
23	23rd Idaho Legislature	January 7, 1935	March 8, 1935	61			
23	23rd Idaho Legislature	March 8, 1935	March 20, 1935	13			
23	23rd Idaho Legislature	July 8, 1935	July 10, 1935	3			
23	23rd Idaho Legislature	July 28, 1936	July 31, 1936	4			
24	24th Idaho Legislature	January 4, 1937	March 6, 1937	62			
24	24th Idaho Legislature	November 28, 1937	November 30, 1937	3			
25	25th Idaho Legislature	January 2, 1939	March 2, 1939	60			
26	26th Idaho Legislature	January 6, 1941	March 8, 1941	62			
27	27th Idaho Legislature	January 4, 1943	February 28, 1943	56			
27	27th Idaho Legislature	February 28, 1944	March 1, 1944	2			
27	27th Idaho Legislature	March 1, 1944	March 4, 1944	4			
28	28th Idaho Legislature	January 8, 1945	March 9, 1945	61			
28	28th Idaho Legislature	February 25, 1946	March 7, 1946	11			
28	28th Idaho Legislature	March 7, 1946	March 7, 1946	1			
29	29th Idaho Legislature	January 6, 1947	March 7, 1947	61			
30	30th Idaho Legislature	January 3, 1949	March 4, 1949	61			
30	30th Idaho Legislature	February 6, 1950	February 25, 1950	20			
31	31st Idaho Legislature	January 8, 1951	March 12, 1951	64			
31	31st Idaho Legislature	January 15, 1952	January 16, 1952	2			
32	32nd Idaho Legislature	January 5, 1953	March 6, 1953	61			
33	33rd Idaho Legislature	January 3, 1955	March 5, 1955	62			
34	34th Idaho Legislature	January 7, 1957	March 16, 1957	69			
35	35th Idaho Legislature	January 5, 1959	March 9, 1959	64	638	303	
36	36th Idaho Legislature	January 2, 1961	March 2, 1961	60	651	331	
36	36th Idaho Legislature	August 3, 1961	August 4, 1961	2	11	4	
37	37th Idaho Legislature	January 7, 1963	March 19, 1963	72	734	429	
37	37th Idaho Legislature	July 29, 1964	August 1, 1964	4	7	6	
38	38th Idaho Legislature	January 4, 1965	March 18, 1965	74	608	321	
38		March 19, 1965	March 25, 1965	7	27	5	
38		February 14, 1966	March 5, 1966	20	67	21	
38		March 7, 1966	March 17, 1966	11	27	6	
39	39th Idaho Legislature	January 2, 1967	March 31, 1967	89	799	437	
39		June 19, 1967	June 23, 1967	5	30	18	
39		January 29, 1968	February 9, 1968	12	52	29	
40	40th Idaho Legislature	January 13, 1969	March 27, 1969	74	796	473	
40	40th Idaho Legislature	January 12, 1970	March 7, 1970	55	511	264	
41	41st Idaho Legislature	January 11, 1971	March 20, 1971	69	660	365	
41		March 22, 1971	April 8, 1971	18	43	10	
41		January 10, 1972	March 25, 1972	75	766	409	
42	42nd Idaho Legislature	January 8, 1973	March 13, 1973	65	589	348	
42	42nd Idaho Legislature	January 14, 1974	March 30, 1974	76	637	325	
43	43rd Idaho Legislature	January 13, 1975	March 22, 1975	68	563	270	
43		January 5, 1976	March 19, 1976	75	738	367	
44	44th Idaho Legislature	January 10, 1977	March 21, 1977	71	645	326	
44		January 9, 1978	March 18, 1978	69	654	375	
45	45th Idaho Legislature	January 8, 1979	March 26, 1979	78	599	325	
45		January 7, 1980	March 31, 1980	85	714	396	
45		May 12, 1980	May 14, 1980	3	15	1	
46	46th Idaho Legislature	January 12, 1981	March 27, 1981	75	701	366	
46		July 7, 1981	July 21, 1981	15	16	2	
46		January 11, 1982	March 24, 1982	73	617	370	
47	47th Idaho Legislature	January 10, 1983	April 14, 1983	95	589	282	
47		May 9, 1983	May 11, 1983	3	8	5	
47		January 9, 1984	March 31, 1984	83	586	289	
48	48th Idaho Legislature	January 7, 1985	March 13, 1985	66	466	274	
48		January 6, 1986	March 28, 1986	82	691	348	
49	49th Idaho Legislature	January 12, 1987	April 1, 1987	80	619	361	
49		January 11, 1988	March 31, 1988	81	732	376	
50	50th Idaho Legislature	January 9, 1989	March 29, 1989	80	752	426	
50		January 8, 1990	March 30, 1990	82	804	439	
51	51st Idaho Legislature	January 7, 1991	March 29, 1991	82	687	338	
51		January 6, 1992	April 3, 1992	89	726	342	
51		July 27, 1992	July 28, 1992	2	4	3	
52	52nd Idaho Legislature	January 11, 1993	March 27, 1993	76	752	416	
52		January 10, 1994	April 1, 1994	82	958	456	
53	53rd Idaho Legislature	January 9, 1995	March 17, 1995	68	679	369	
53		January 8, 1996	March 15, 1996	68	772	433	
54	54th Idaho Legislature	January 6, 1997	March 19, 1997	73	695	404	
54		January 12, 1998	March 23, 1998	71	708	428	
55	55th Idaho Legislature	January 11, 1999	March 19, 1999	68	666	397	
55		January 10, 2000	April 5, 2000	87	737	487	
56	56th Idaho Legislature	January 8, 2001	March 30, 2001	82	662	397	
56		January 7, 2002	March 14, 2002	68	605	371	
57	57th Idaho Legislature	January 6, 2003	May 3, 2003	118	678	381	
57		January 12, 2004	March 20, 2004	69	617	389	
58	58th Idaho Legislature	January 10, 2005	April 6, 2005	87	642	405	
58		January 9, 2006	April 11, 2006	93	735	459	
58		August 25, 2006	August 25, 2006	1	1	1	
59	59th Idaho Legislature	January 8, 2007	March 30, 2007	82	581	369	2006 Idaho Legislature election
59		January 7, 2008	April 2, 2008	87	633	410	
60	60th Idaho Legislature	January 12, 2009	May 8, 2009	117	624	344	
60		January 11, 2010	March 29, 2010	78	549	359	
61	61st Idaho Legislature	January 10, 2011	April 7, 2011	88	565	335	November 2010
61		January 9, 2012	March 29, 2012	81	552	342	
62	62nd Idaho Legislature	January 7, 2013	April 4, 2013	88	545	357	November 2012
62		January 6, 2014	March 20, 2014	74	542	357	
63	63rd Idaho Legislature	January 12, 2015	April 11, 2015	89	523	346	November 2014
63		May 18, 2015	May 18, 2015	1	1	1	
63		January 11, 2016	March 25, 2016	75	557	377	
64	64th Idaho Legislature	January 9, 2017	March 29, 2017	80	540	337	November 2016
64		January 8, 2018	March 28, 2018	80	561	355	
65	65th Idaho Legislature	January 7, 2019	April 7, 2019	95	522	331	November 2018
66	66th Idaho Legislature	January 2021					November 2020: House, Senate
67	67th Idaho Legislature	January 2023					November 2022: House, Senate
68	68th Idaho Legislature	January 2025					November 2024: House, Senate

== See also ==
- List of speakers of the Idaho House of Representatives
- List of presidents pro tempore of the Idaho Senate
- List of governors of Idaho
- Idaho State Capitol
- Timeline of Idaho history
- Lists of United States state legislative sessions
