= Blodgett Canyon =

Canyon in Montana, United States

Coordinates: 46.274°N 114.300°W

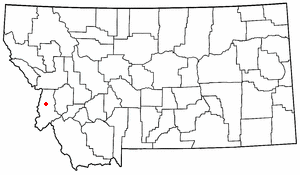
Location of Blodgett Canyon within Montana

Blodgett Canyon is located in southwestern Montana in the northwestern United States. It is one of more than two dozen scenic canyons deeply carved into the eastern flanks of the Bitterroot Range in Bitterroot National Forest. Starting from a group of peaks at over 8,500 feet (2,600 m) along the Idaho/Montana border, the canyon steeply drops to Blodgett Lake at 6,800 feet (2,100 m). After running northeast for about a mile, it turns due east and descends for a total of about 12 miles (19 km) to the Bitterroot Valley. A trailhead is located at the mouth of the canyon, just west of the community of Hamilton and at an elevation of 4,000 feet (m).

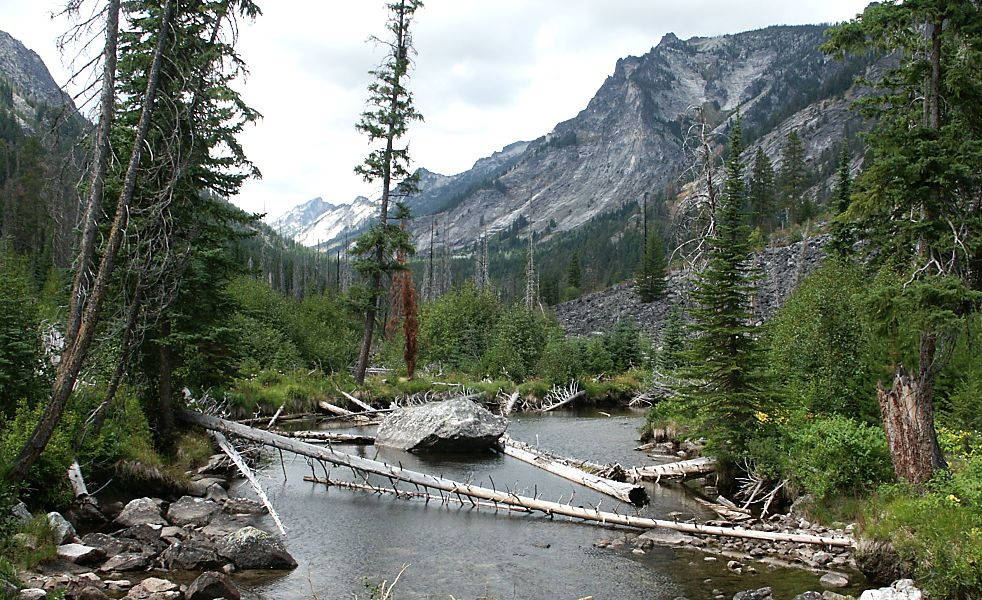
Blodgett Canyon, Montana, looking west

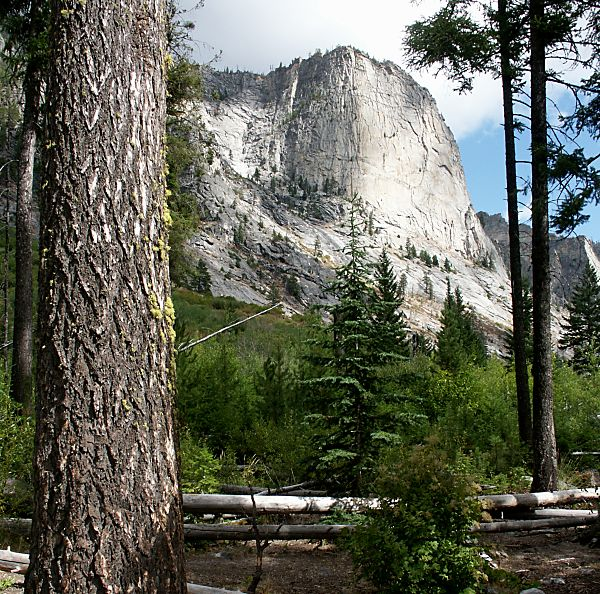
View east near the mouth of Blodgett Canyon

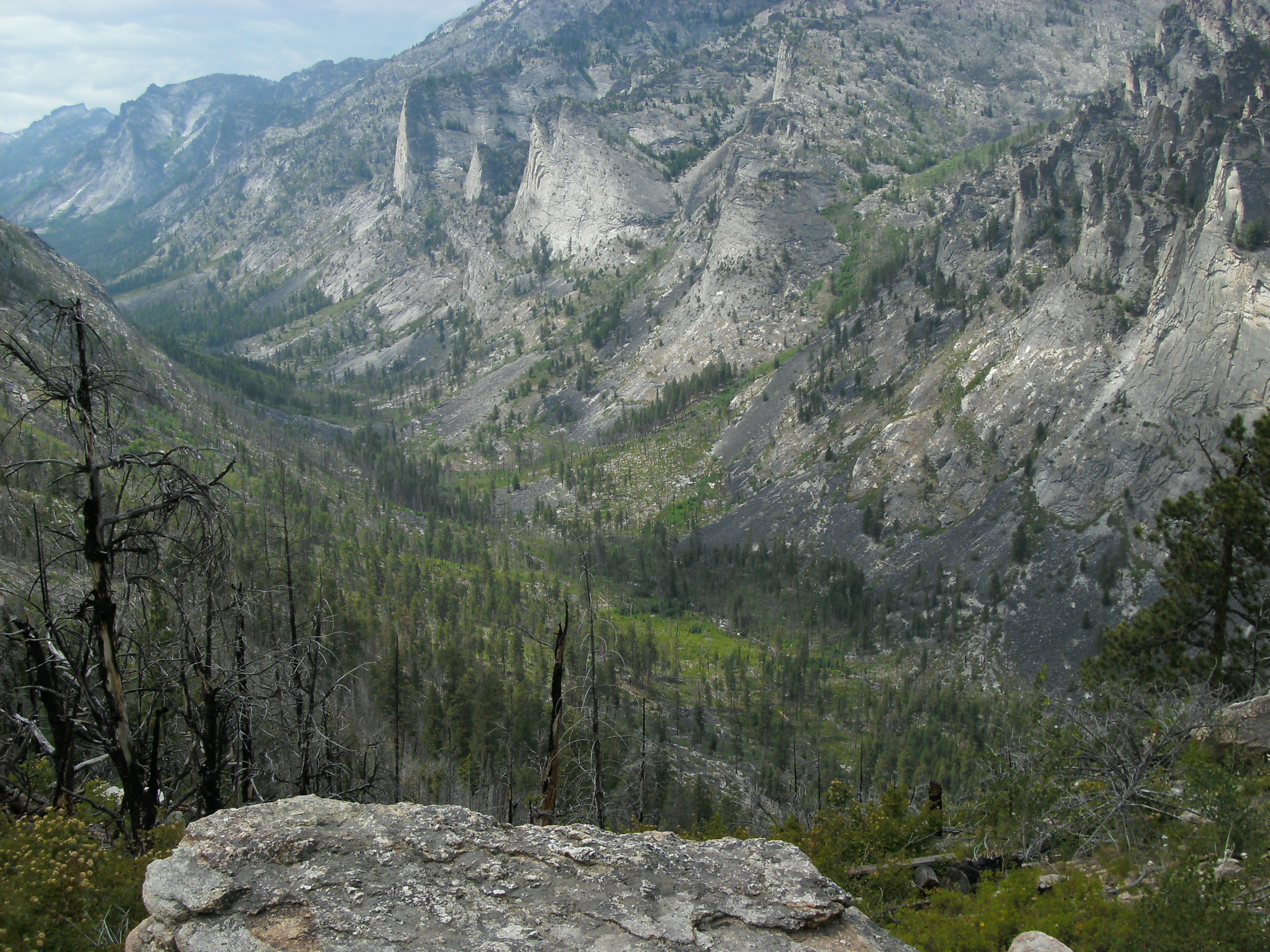
View from overlook trail

The vertical canyon walls in the lower section rise over 2,000 feet (610 m) above Blodgett Creek. Printz Ridge and Mill Point make up the northern wall, while Canyon Peak and Romney Ridge contribute to the southern wall. The upper (western) section of the canyon is part of the Selway-Bitterroot Wilderness Area.

In the year 2000, the forest in the lower section of Blodgett Canyon was extensively burned. This damage extends about 2 miles (3.2 km) above the trailhead.

== Geology ==
The canyons in this region were carved out by ice age glaciers, which left behind U-shaped valleys, moraines, hanging valleys, and steeply carved granite mountains, cliffs, and cirques, all of which are visible within Blodgett Canyon. The glacial valley is carved into granitic rocks of the Bitterroot Lobe of the Idaho Batholith, a Late Cretaceous to Paleocene intrusive body emplaced by subduction beneath the western margin of North America.

== Recreation ==
Blodgett Canyon is known among the climbing community as one of the best big wall climbing spots in Montana and the region. The tallest route is the South Face of Flathead Buttress, at about 1,200 feet of sustained vertical.
