= Clearwater National Forest =

National forest in Idaho, United States

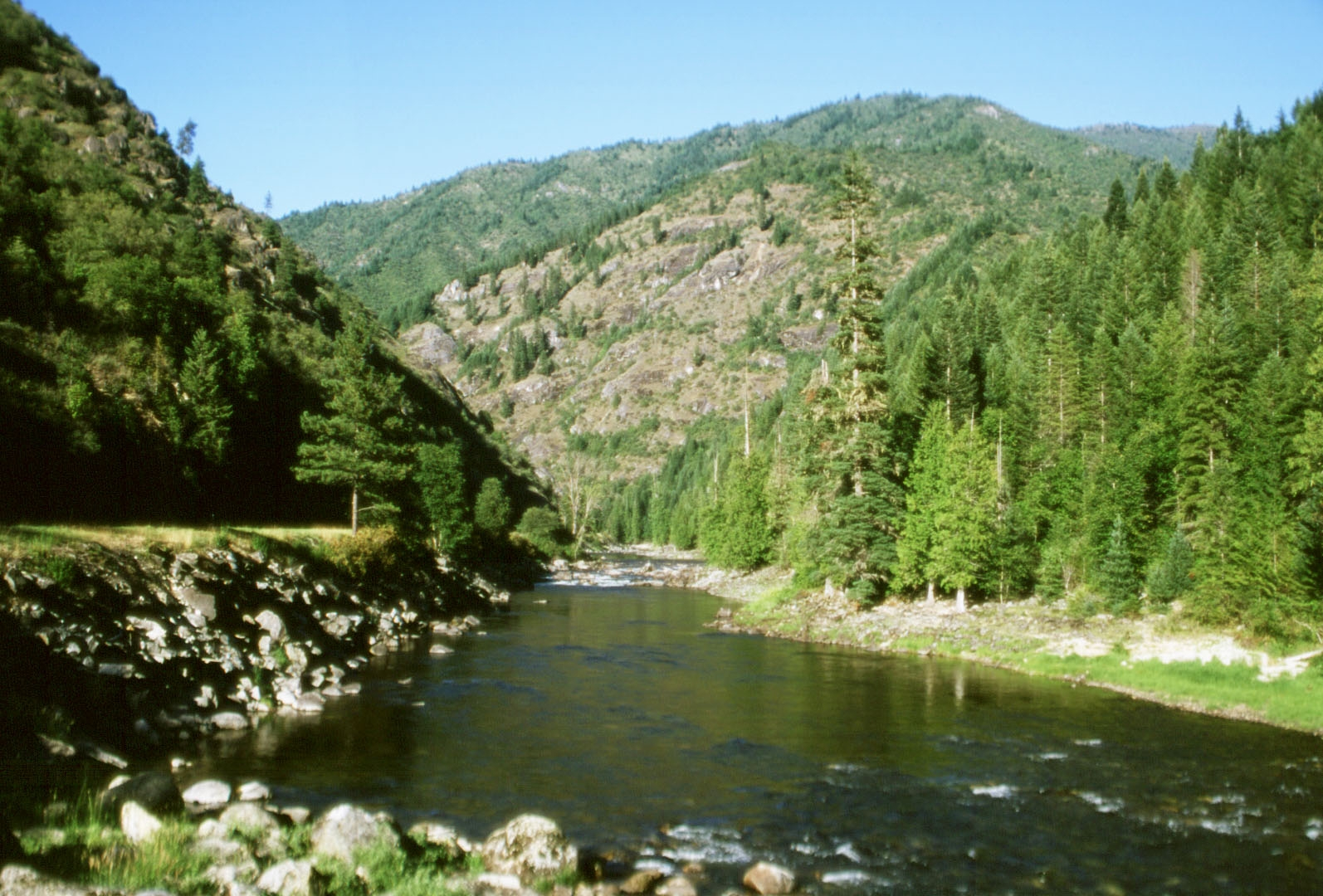
- Lochsa River Canyon

- Location within the United States
- Location: Idaho, United States
- Nearest city: Orofino, ID
- Coordinates: 46°33′4″N 115°9′37″W
- Area: 2,612,000 acres (10,570 km^{2})
- Established: July 1, 1908
- Governing body: U.S. Forest Service
- Website: Nez Perce-Clearwater National Forests

Clearwater National Forest with headquarters on the Nez Perce Reservation at Kamiah is located in North Central Idaho in the northwestern United States. The forest is bounded on the east by the state of Montana, on the north by the Idaho Panhandle National Forest, and on the south and west by the Nez Perce National Forest and Palouse Prairie.

The North Fork of the Clearwater and the Lochsa rivers provide miles of tumbling white water interspersed with quiet pools for migratory and resident fish. The mountains provide a habitat for raccoon, elk, moose, black bear, two species of fox, bald eagle, marten, white-tailed and mule deer, coyote, wolf packs, cougar, boreal owl, river otter, muskrat, beaver, pika, fisher, mink, and mountain goat.

In 2012, Clearwater National Forest and Nez Perce National Forest were administratively combined as Nez Perce-Clearwater National Forests, with headquarters in Kamiah, Idaho.

== Features ==
The forest is 2 million acres (8,100 km^{2}) and contains mountains and river drainage areas. The Lochsa and Clearwater Rivers flow through the forest region. Portions of the Selway-Bitterroot Wilderness are also located in the forest. In descending order of land area the forest is located in Idaho, Clearwater, and Shoshone counties. Forest Service headquarters are located in Kamiah, Idaho. There are local ranger district offices in Kooskia, Powell (near Lolo, Montana, on the Idaho/Montana state line), Orofino, and Potlatch. The North Fork Ranger Station & Visitor Center in Orofino is your one-stop-shop for information about the Clearwater and Nez Perce National Forests, as well as Dworshak Dam Visitor Center and Dworshak Reservoir, popular recreation sites just nine miles northwest of Orofino.

The Clearwater National Forest is home to the well-known Jerry Johnson Hot Springs and the smaller Weir Creek Hot Springs. Both springs are accessible via trails from U.S. Highway 12 and are popular tourist attractions, drawing visitors from Idaho and western Montana.

Lewis and Clark travelled through the region in their journey westward in 1805–1804. Upon reaching Lolo Pass at the eastern edge of the forest on September 15, 1805, William Clark was quoted as saying,

From this mountain I could observe high rugged mountains in every direction as far as I could see.

The Clearwater National Forest was established on July 1, 1908, with 2,687,860 acres (10,877.4 km^{2}) from parts of Coeur d'Alene National Forest and Bitterroot National Forest. On October 31, 1934, part of Selway National Forest was added.

A small part of the Selway-Bitterroot Wilderness lies within Clearwater National Forest, although the largest portion of the wilderness lies in either the neighboring Nez Perce National Forest, Bitterroot National Forest, or Lolo National Forest.

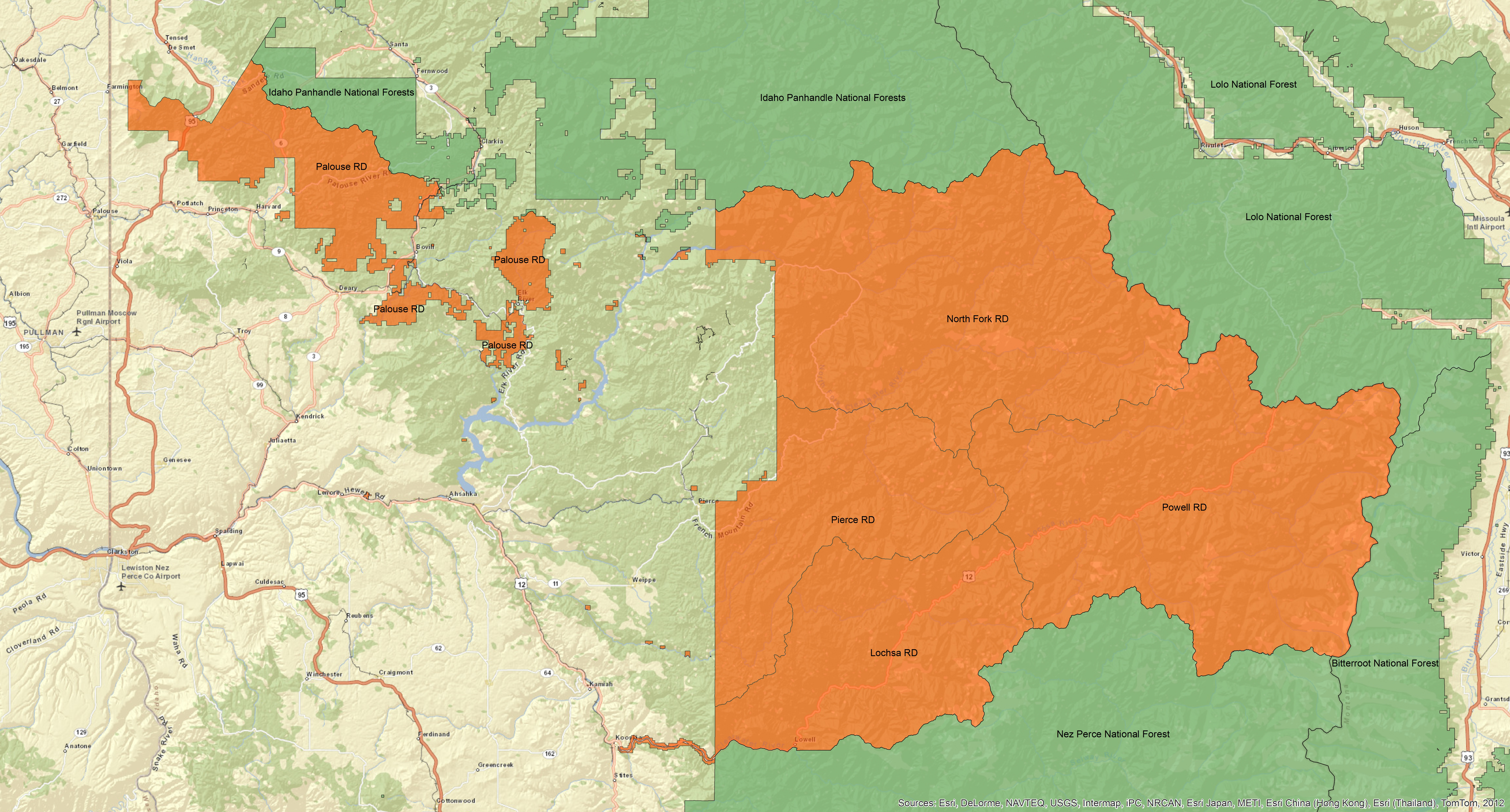
Map of Clearwater National Forest

== See also ==
- List of national forests of the United States
