= Bitterroot National Forest =

U.S. forest across Montana and Idaho

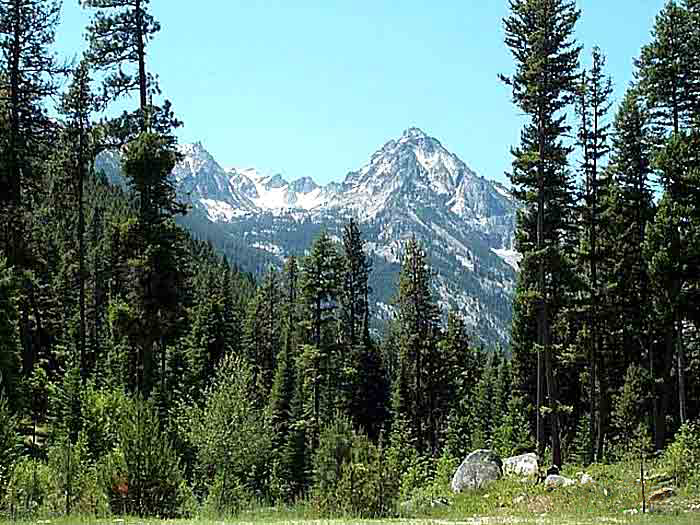
- Trapper Peak in Bitterroot National Forest

- Location within the United States
- Location: Ravalli / Missoula counties, Montana; Idaho County, Idaho, United States
- Nearest city: Missoula, MT
- Coordinates: 46°13′58″N 113°57′49″W
- Area: 1,587,070 acres (6,422.6 km^{2})
- Established: 1898
- Governing body: U.S. Forest Service
- Website: Bitterroot National Forest

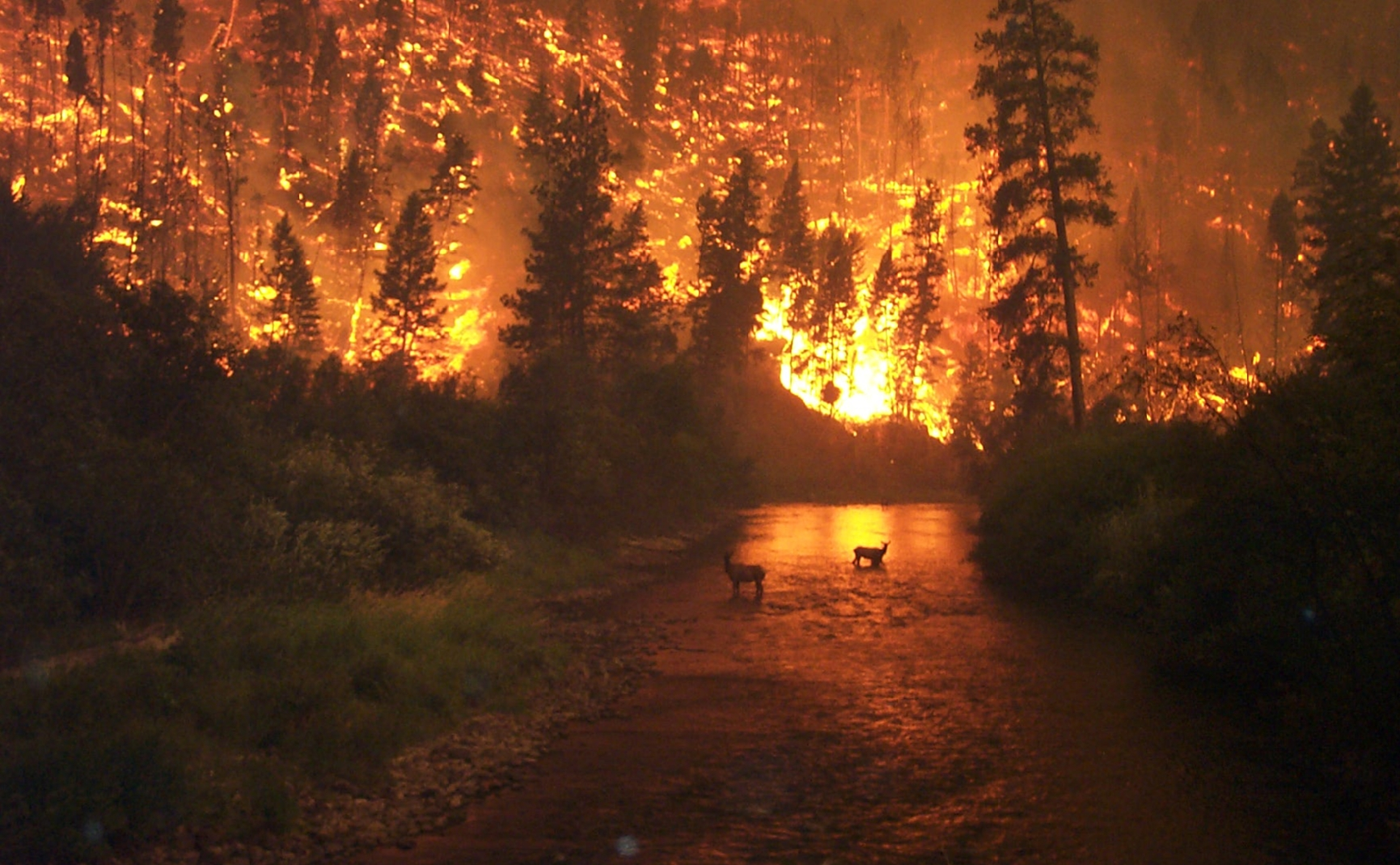
Wildfire in the forest as photographed on August 6, 2000

Bitterroot National Forest comprises 1.587 million acres (6,423 km^{2}) in west-central Montana and eastern Idaho of the United States. It is located primarily in Ravalli County, Montana (70.26% of the forest), but also has acreage in Idaho County, Idaho (29.24%), and Missoula County, Montana (0.49%).

Founded in 1898, the forest is located in the Bitterroot and Sapphire Mountains with elevations ranging from 2,200 feet (650 m) along the Salmon River in Idaho to 10,157 foot (3,100 m) Trapper Peak. Roughly half the forest (743,000 acres, 3,000 km^{2}) make up part or all of three distinct Wilderness areas. These areas include the Anaconda–Pintler, Selway–Bitterroot and Frank Church River of No Return Wildernesses. The distinction is that in wilderness areas, no roads, logging, mining or other construction is permitted and all access must be done either on foot or horseback; even bicycles are not permitted. Hunting, however is allowed forest-wide including wilderness areas.

== History ==
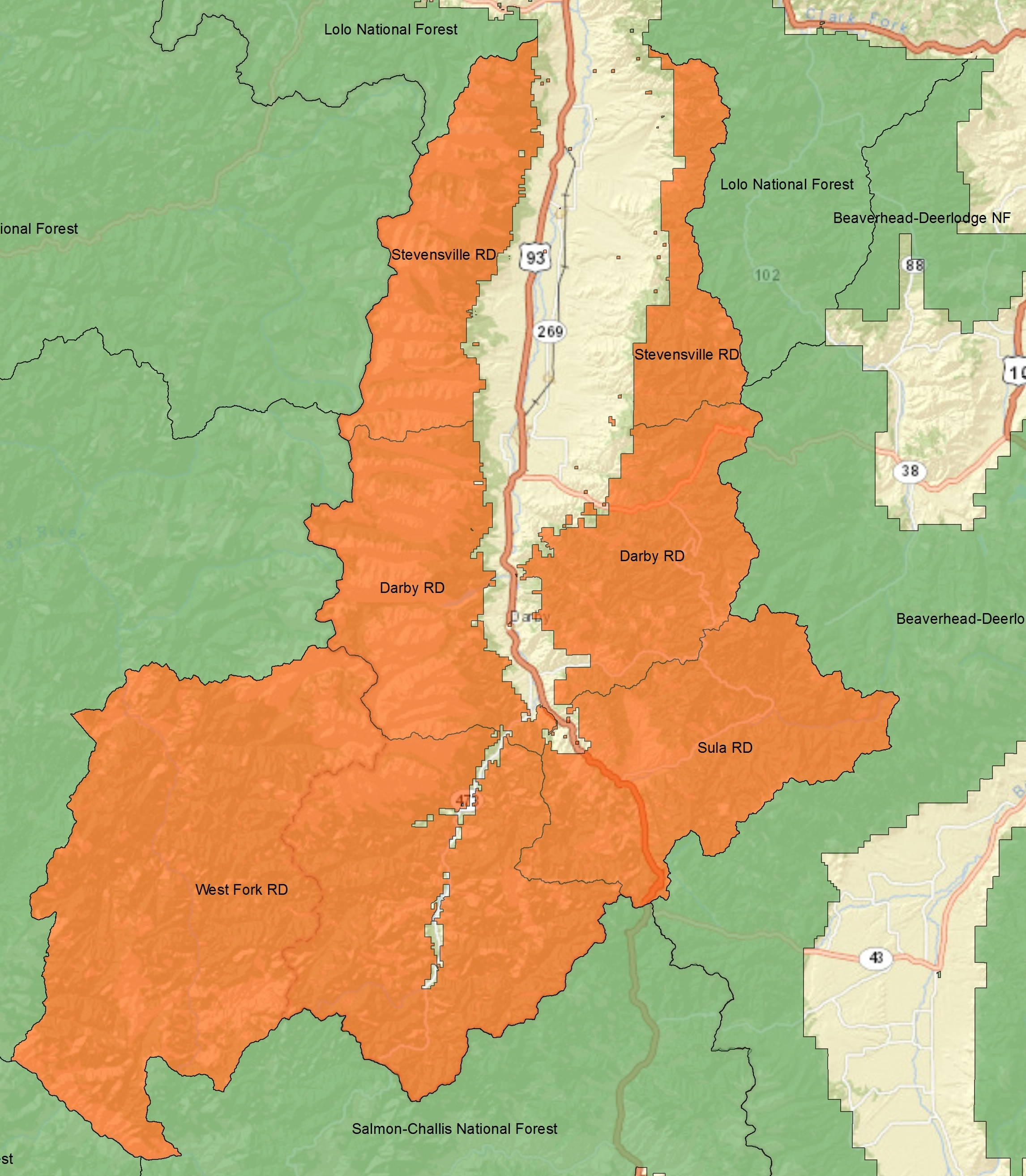
A map of Bitterroot National Forest

The Lewis and Clark Expedition in 1805 passed through parts of future forest lands. After the discovery of gold in Idaho and then Montana in the 1860s, numerous mining towns were built, some of which dwindled into ghost towns. The Nez Perce National Historic Trail passes through a portion of the forest, following the route of the retreating Nez Perce on their historic path that led from Idaho to north central Montana in 1877. Heavy logging and other resource depletion beginning in the 1880s led conservationists to push for the preservation of the forest.

The Bitter Root Forest Reserve was established by the United States General Land Office on March 1, 1898, with 4,147,200 acres (16,783 km^{2}). It was transferred to the U.S. Forest Service in 1906. On July 1, 1908, the name was changed to Bitterroot National Forest, with lands added from Big Hole National Forest and Hell Gate National Forest. Other lands were transferred from Bitterroot to Beaverhead, Clearwater, Nez Perce and Salmon National Forests. On October 29, 1934, part of Selway National Forest was added.

In August 2016, a wildfire burned down fourteen houses.

== Wildlife ==
The forest is home to many species of wildlife species including mule deer, white-tailed deer, elk, bighorn sheep, mountain goat, gopher, a variety of chipmunks, beaver, porcupine, woodchuck, rabbits, a variety of squirrels, moose, black bear, and cougar in addition to many varieties of birds.

== Composition ==
The forest is a combination of both grasslands and forested zones. Grazing rights are leased to private landowners in the lower altitudes where grasses and shrublands are dominant. Higher up, Douglas fir, larch, and lodgepole pine slowly give way to Engelmann Spruce and whitebark pine as the altitude increases. Above the treeline at 8,000 feet (2,400 m) the trees abruptly end and alpine flowers and grasses are found. A small grizzly bear population is located in the wilderness zones of the forest with black bear, mountain goat, bighorn sheep, elk and moose found all over this forest. An active effort to reintroduce the grizzly bear to the region concluded in 2000 with a plan to release 25 bears into the wilderness zones over a five-year period beginning in 2003.

There are 1,600 mi (2,500 km) of trails and 18 improved campgrounds within the forest. Outstanding fishing is found in the dozens of rivers and streams and lakes. The forest headquarters is located in Hamilton, Montana. There are local ranger district offices in Darby, Stevensville, and Sula. The largest nearby city is Missoula, Montana. The scenic Blodgett Canyon is but one of many steep canyons located in the forest. U.S. Highway 93 passes through portions of the forest.

== Wilderness areas ==
There are three officially designated wilderness areas in Bitterroot National Forest that are part of the National Wilderness Preservation System. All of them, however, lie mostly in neighboring National Forests (or in Bureau of Land Management land), as indicated.

- Anaconda–Pintler Wilderness (partly in Beaverhead NF, Deerlodge NF)
- Frank Church–River of No Return Wilderness (partly in Payette NF, Challis NF, Salmon NF, Boise NF, Nez Perce NF, or on BLM land)
- Selway–Bitterroot Wilderness (partly in Nez Perce NF, Clearwater NF, Lolo NF)

== Unprotected roadless areas ==
Much of the forest outside of designated wilderness areas is still roadless and undeveloped. In addition to roadless acreage adjacent to designated wildernesses, a large roadless area 164,000 acres in size (as of 1992) and straddling the Montana–Idaho state line exists just west of Lost Trail Pass. This area, named for 9,154' Allan Mountain (in Idaho), lies mostly in Montana and is critical to the migration of wildlife between the wildlands of central Idaho and the Greater Yellowstone Ecosystem. The Allan Mountain area is a lower-elevation part of the Bitterroot Range that features extensive coniferous forests, steep canyons, and pockets of old-growth ponderosa pine and Douglas-fir. Within the area is Overwhich Falls, a popular attraction; hiker's gentian (Gentianopsis simplex) and primrose monkey flower (mimulus primuloides), sensitive plants, are found here in wet meadows. Elk, black bear, mountain goat, pine marten, and pileated woodpecker are residents.

== See also ==
- List of national forests of the United States
- 2000–01 fires in the Western United States
- 2016 Nevada wildfire
- Bitterroot Mountains
- List of forests in Montana
