= Salmon River National Forest =

Former national forest in Idaho

Salmon River National Forest was established as the Salmon River Forest Reserve by the U.S. Forest Service in Idaho on November 5, 1906 with 1,879,680 acres (7,606.8 km^{2}). It became a National Forest on March 4, 1907. On July 1, 1908 part of the forest was combined with Challis National Forest and part with Salmon National Forest and the name was discontinued.

== See also ==
- Salmon National Forest
