= Henry's Lake National Forest =

National Forest in Idaho, U.S.

Henry's Lake National Forest was established as the Henry's Lake Forest Reserve by the U.S. Forest Service in Idaho on May 23, 1905 with 798,720 acres (3,232.3 km^{2}). It became a National Forest on March 4, 1907. On July 1, 1908 the entire forest was combined with a portion of Yellowstone National Forest to establish Targhee National Forest and the name was discontinued.
