= Idaho Panhandle National Forests =

National forests in Idaho, United States

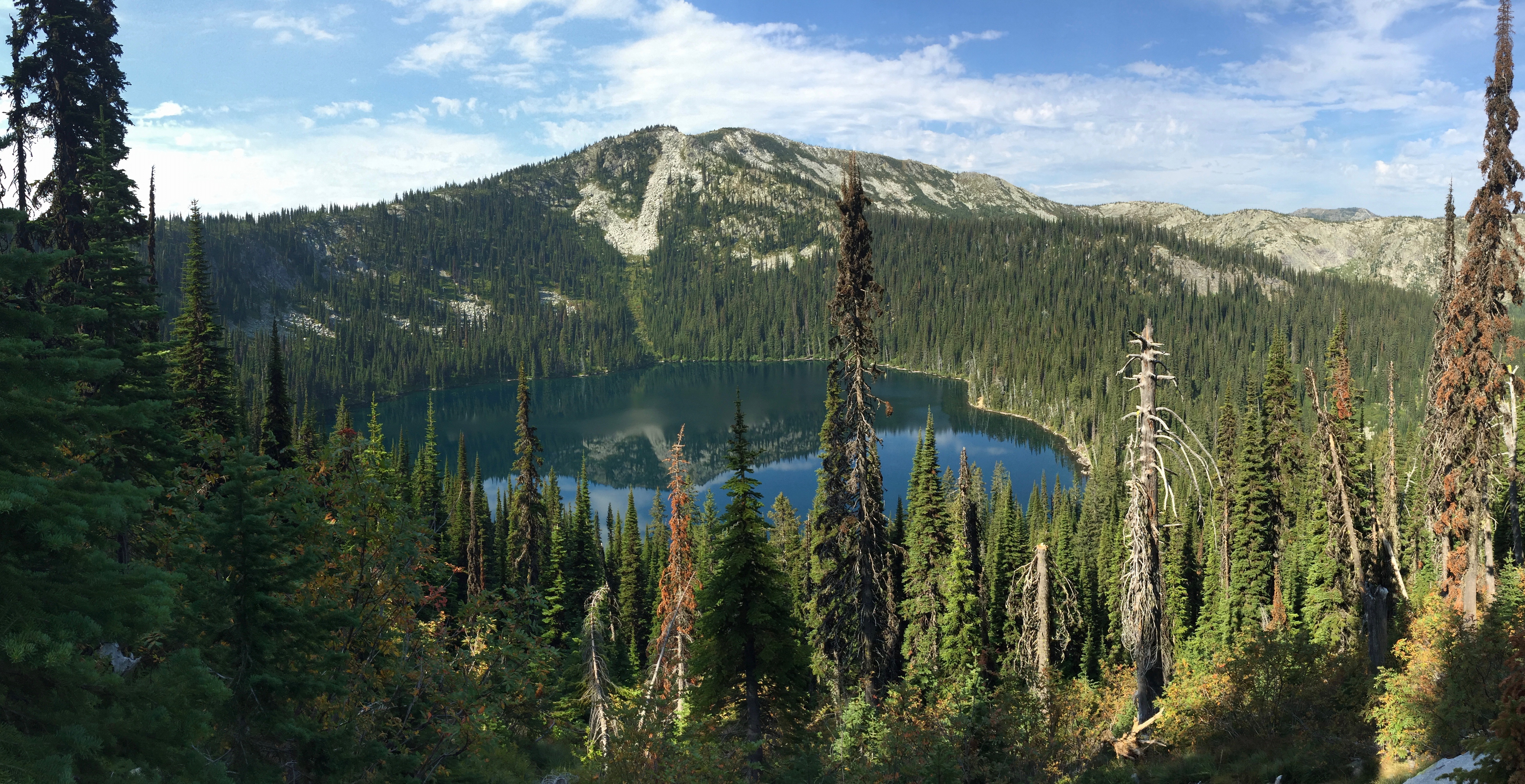
- Hidden Lake in Idaho Panhandle National Forest

- Location within the United States
- Location: Idaho-Montana-Washington, United States
- Nearest city: Spokane, WA
- Coordinates: 47°43′N 116°13′W
- Area: 3,220,000 acres (13,000 km^{2})
- Established: 1912
- Governing body: U.S. Forest Service
- Website: Idaho Panhandle National Forests

The Idaho Panhandle National Forests are a jointly administered set of three national forests located mostly in the U.S. state of Idaho. In 1973, major portions of the Kaniksu, Coeur d'Alene, and St. Joe National Forests were combined to be administratively managed as the Idaho Panhandle National Forests (IPNF). The IPNF consists of more than 2.5 million acres (10,000 km^{2}) of public lands in the panhandle of north Idaho, with small areas extending into eastern Washington (4.7%) and western Montana (1.2%). The northernmost portion of the IPNF share a boundary with Canada. The Forest Supervisor's office is located in Coeur d'Alene, Idaho with district office's in Bonners Ferry, Sandpoint, Priest River (Priest Lake Ranger District), Fernan and Smelterville (Coeur d'Alene River Ranger District), and St. Maries and Avery (St. Joe Ranger District).

== Geography ==
Elevations on the IPNF range from 2,100 to 7,600 feet with as much as 80 inches of precipitation at high elevations. The IPNF is characterized by several mountain ranges including the Selkirk Mountains, Cabinet Mountains, Purcell Mountains, Coeur d'Alene Mountains, and Bitterroot Range, interspersed with large lakes such as Lakes Coeur d'Alene, Pend Oreille, and the upper and lower Priest. Major river valleys consist of the St. Joe, Coeur d'Alene, Priest, Pend Oreille, Clark Fork, and Kootenai.

== Wildlife ==
The Idaho Panhandle National Forests contain a wide variety of wildlife. White-tailed deer, mule deer, raccoons, elk, grizzly bears, moose, black bears, coyotes, timber wolves, skunks, cougars, marten, beavers, river otters, bobcats, minks, and wolverines are often seen by visitors.

Bird species include ravens, wild turkey, blue jays, California quail, numerous species of grouse, osprey, golden eagle, bald eagle and numerous types of owls. The rivers and lakes in the Panhandle hold some of the best fishing locations in the world.

== Wilderness areas ==
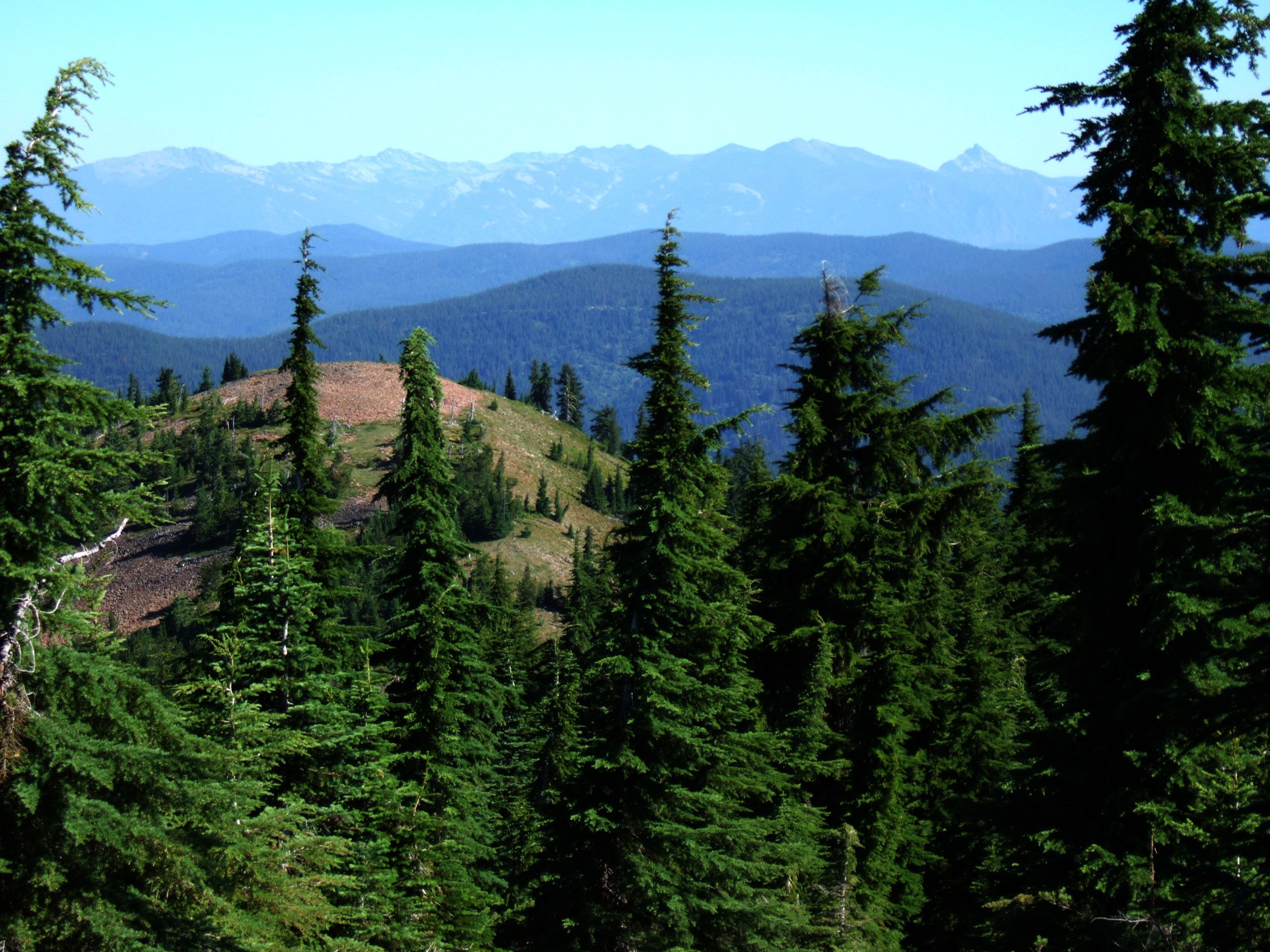
Scotchman Peaks

There is one officially designated wilderness area within the IPNF that is a part of the National Wilderness Preservation System. The Salmo-Priest Wilderness lies partially within the Priest Lake Ranger District of the IPNF and extends into the neighboring Colville National Forest. Four roadless areas are currently proposed for wilderness totaling 146,700 acres (590 km^{2}):

- Salmo-Priest Roadless Area (Idaho Portion)
- Selkirk Crest
- Scotchman Peaks
- Mallard-Larkins

== Recreation ==
The IPNF manages for a diversity of recreational opportunities, and there are extensive trail networks for stock, OHVs, hiking, and winter snowmobile and cross country skiing. Over 1,400 miles (2,250 km) of trails are maintained for hiking and 800 (1,290 km) miles for ATV use. Notable trails include the Pulaski Tunnel Trail, which explores the history of the Great Fire of 1910 and the firefighters who battled them, and the Route of the Hiawatha, a 15-mile (24-km) rails-to-trails route which includes the 1.7 mile (2.7 km) Taft Tunnel. The Emerald Creek Garnet Area provides an opportunity to collect star garnets and is one of only two places in the world where these gems can be found. The forests contain two groves of old growth ancient Giant western red cedar, Settler's Grove of Ancient Cedars near Murray, Idaho and Roosevelt Grove of Ancient Cedars near Nordman, Idaho, both of which are popular hiking trails.

== Photos ==
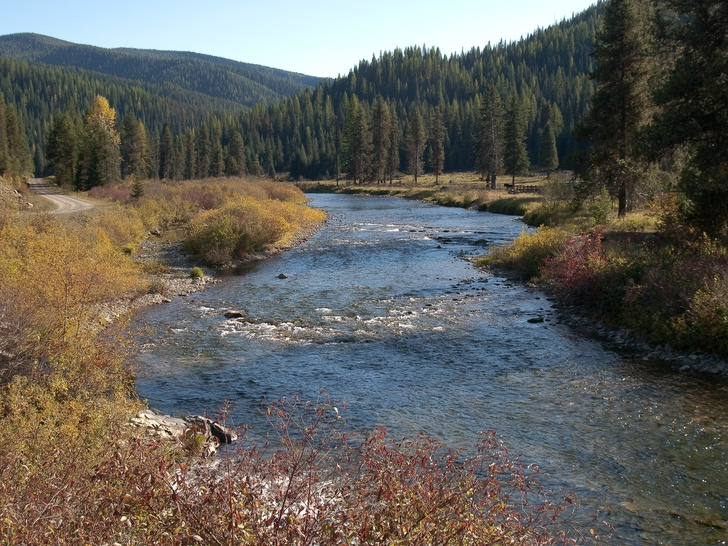
The St. Joe River at Red Ives

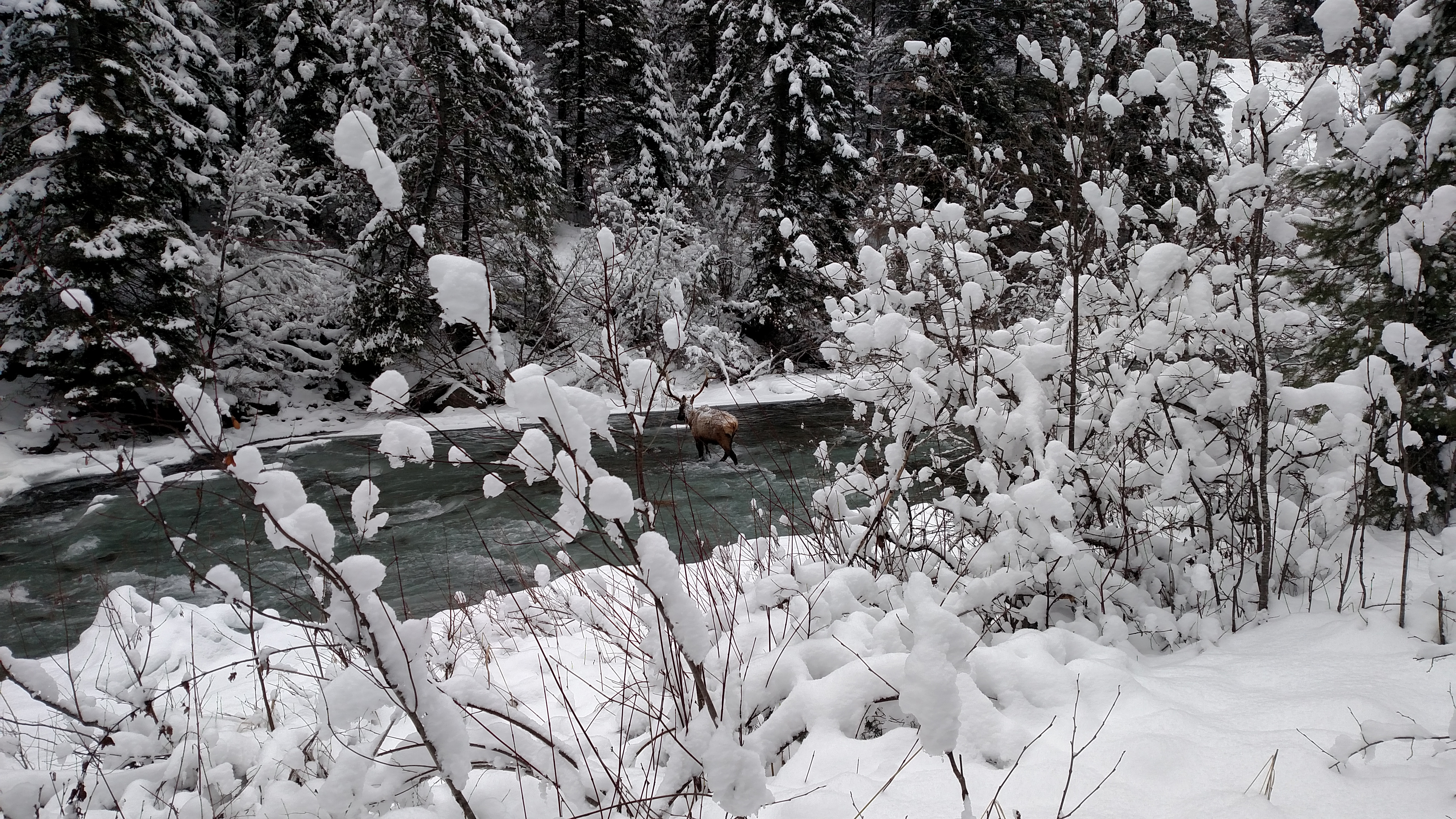
Winter on the North Fork of the St. Joe River

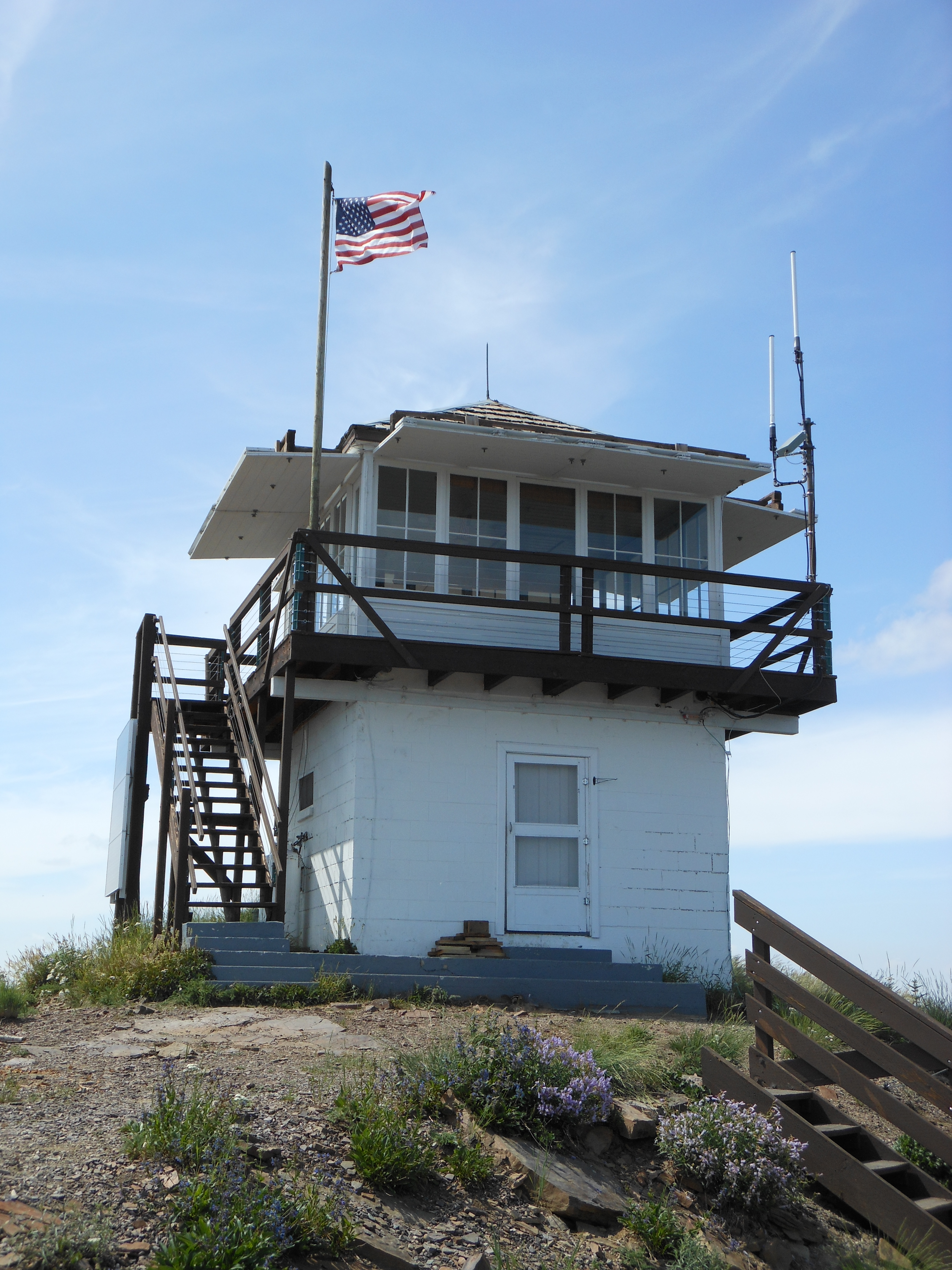
Little Guard Lookout in the Coeur d'Alene River area

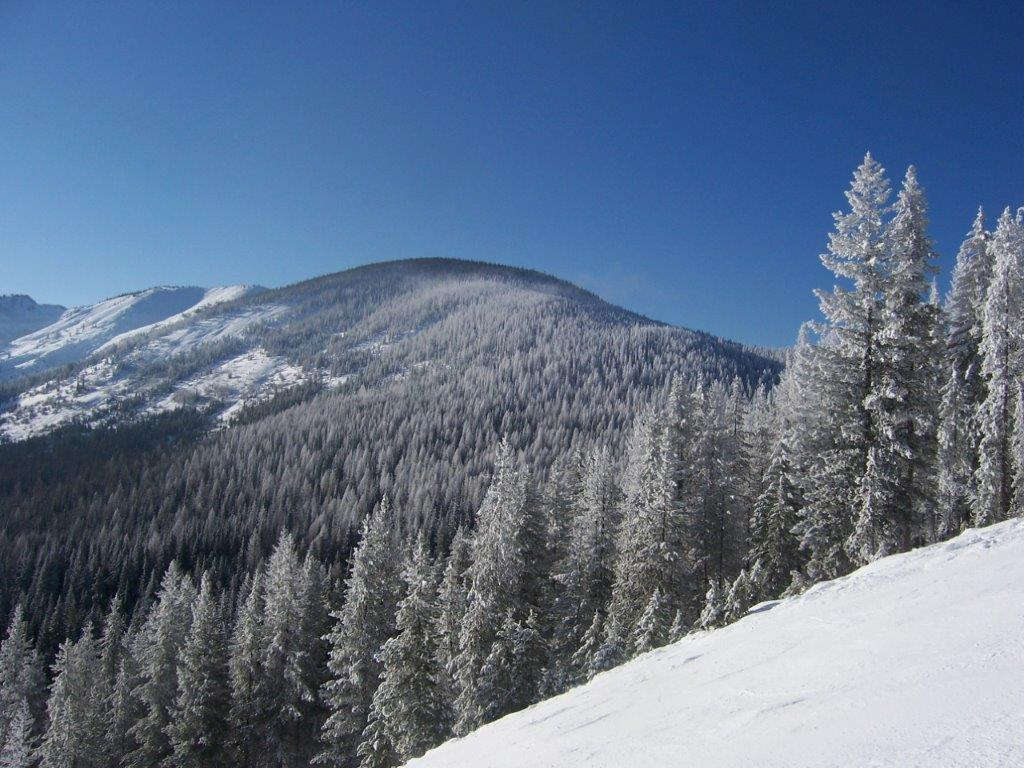
Winter view from near the Lookout Pass Ski Area

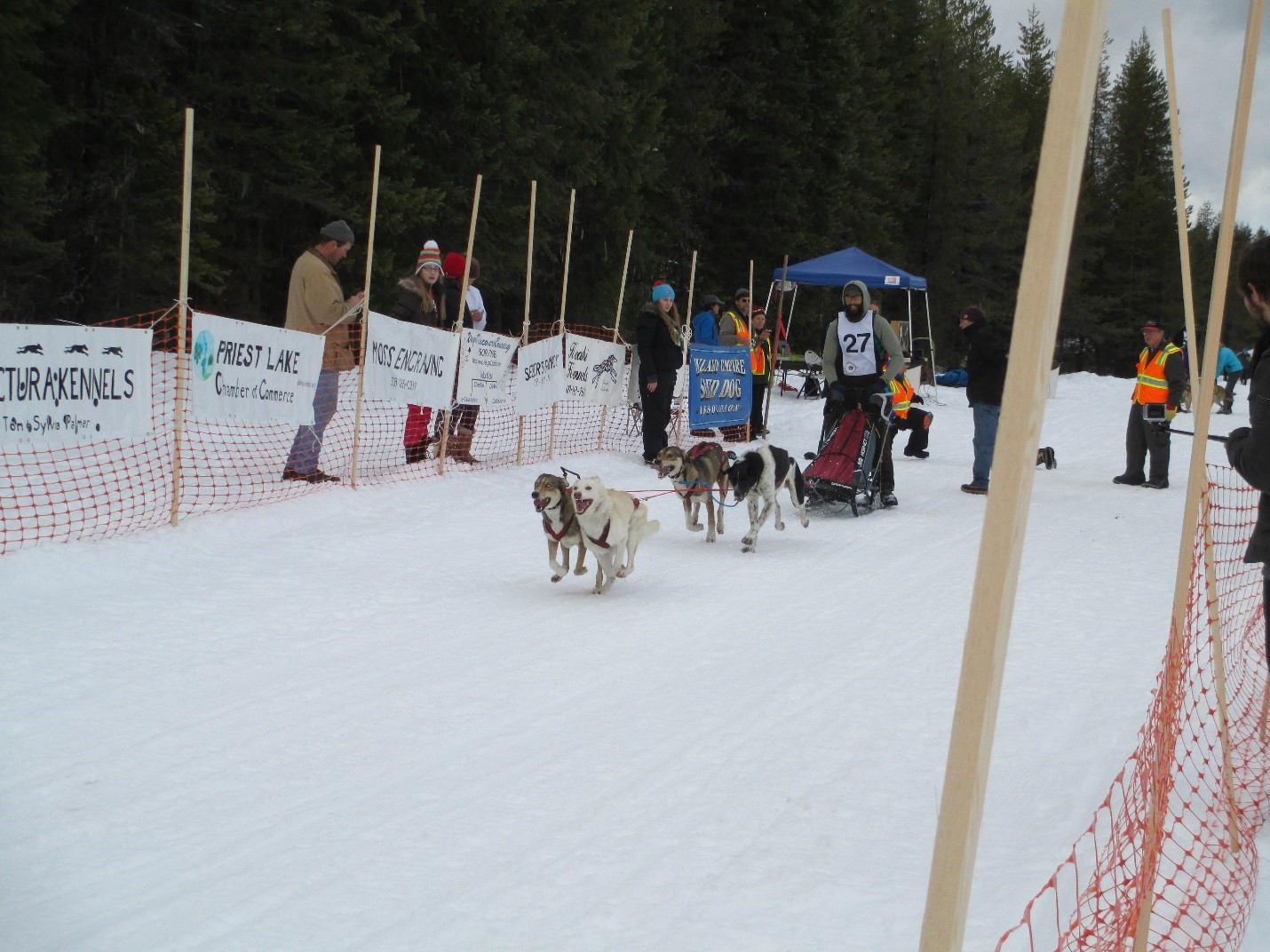
2017 Inland Empire dog races near Priest Lake

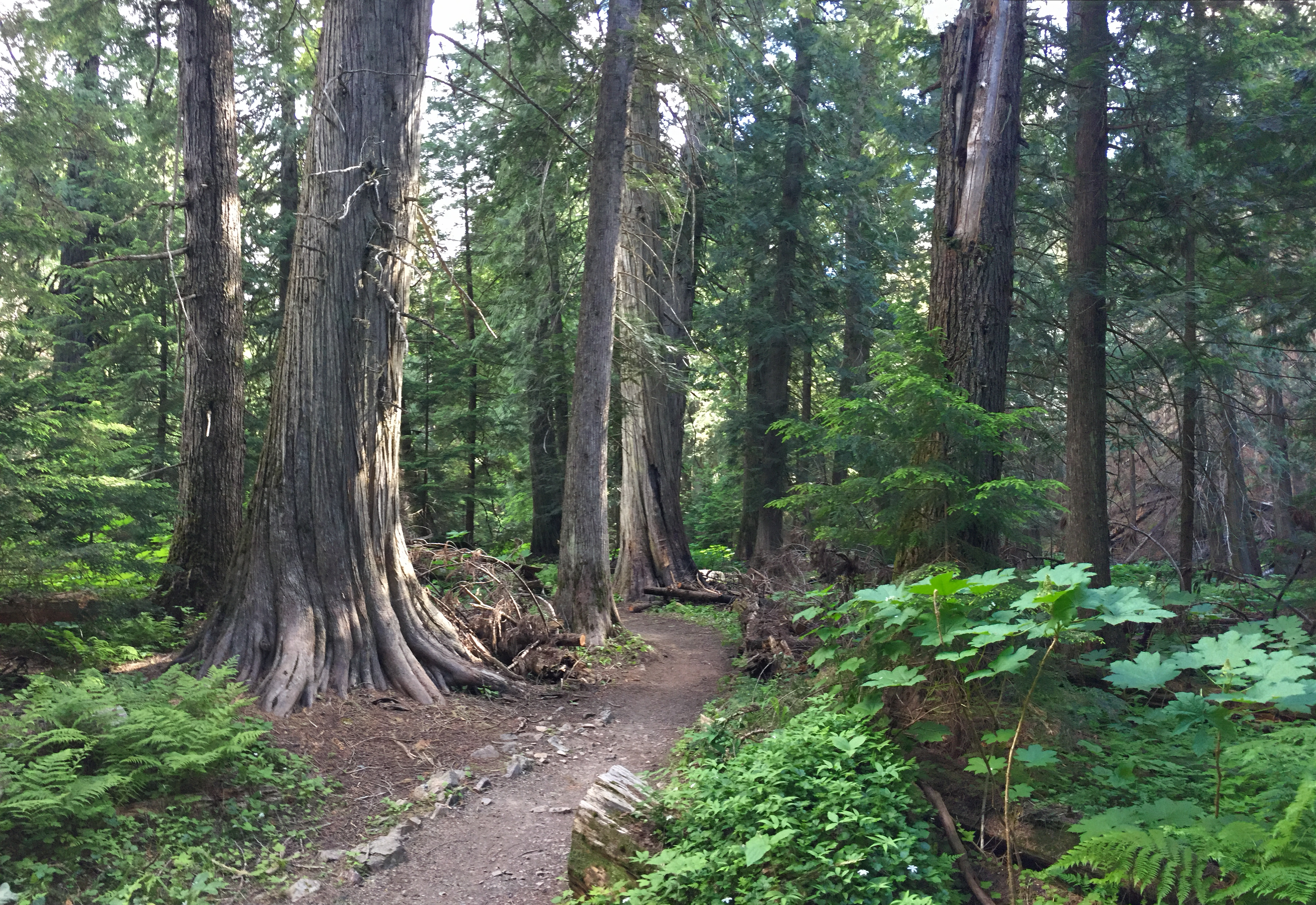
Settlers Grove of Ancient Cedars

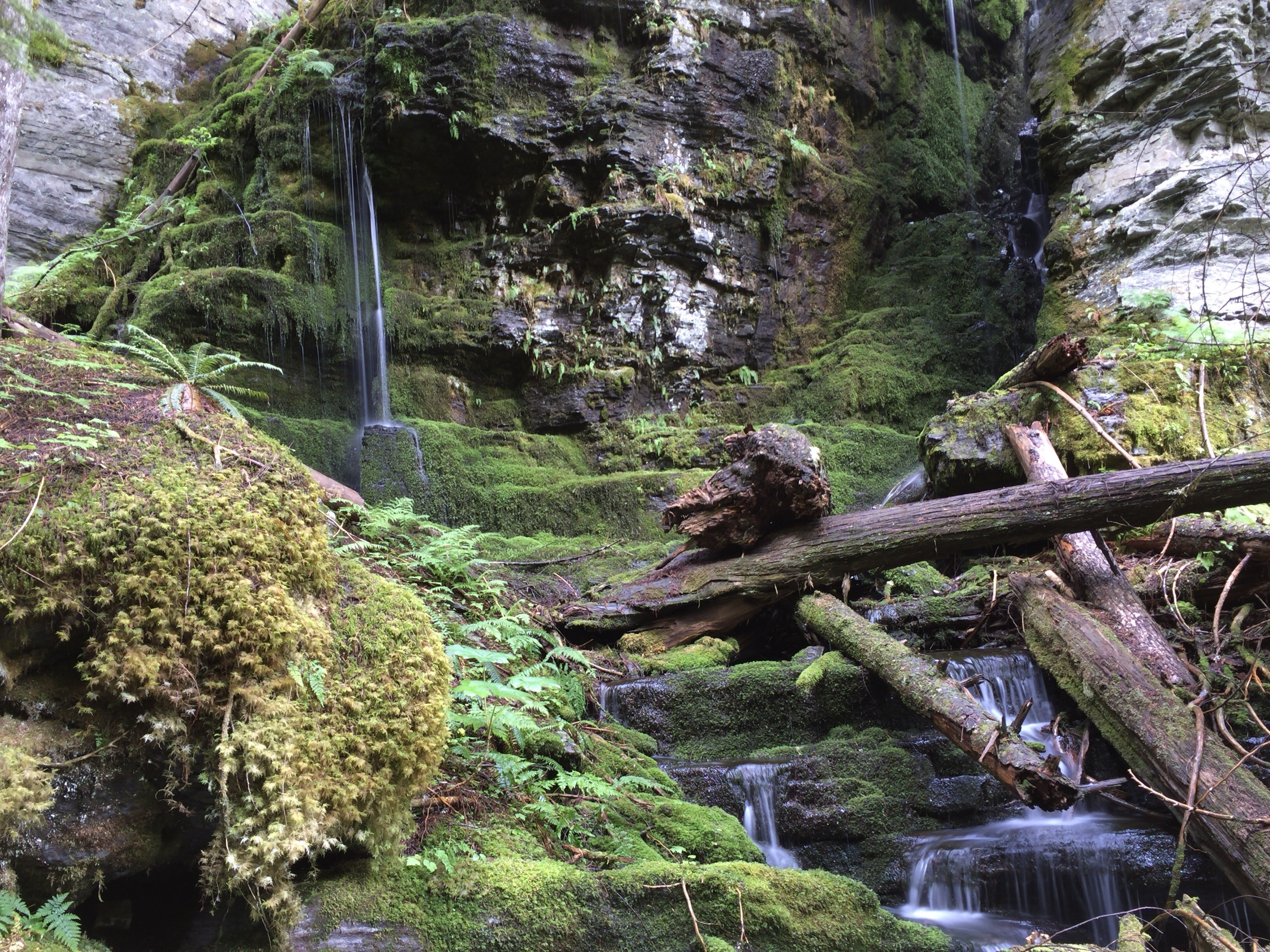
Stream running into Coal Creek

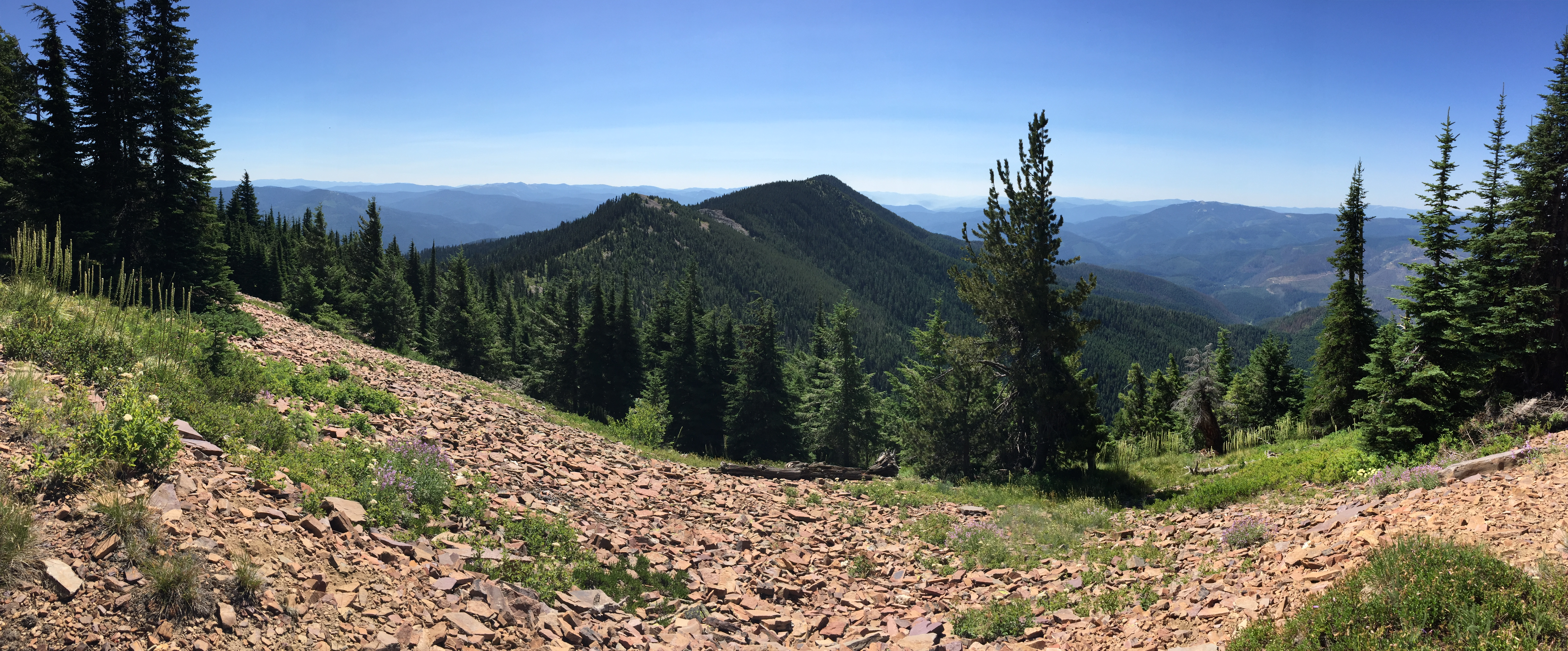
Shoshone Ridge from Pond Peak

== See also ==
- List of national forests of the United States
