= Raft River National Forest =

Former national forest in Utah and Idaho

Coordinates: 43°54′N 115°00′W

Raft River National Forest was established as the Raft River Forest Reserve in Utah and Idaho on November 5, 1906 with 410,247 acres (1,660.21 km^{2}). It became a National Forest on March 4, 1907 and was named after the Raft River Mountains, which it contained. On July 1, 1908 it was combined with Cassia National Forest to create Minidoka National Forest. The name was discontinued. The land is now part of Sawtooth National Forest as the Raft River Division of the Minidoka Ranger District.
