= Selway National Forest =

Former national forest in Idaho

Coordinates: 46.17698°N 115.21500°W

Selway National Forest was established by the U.S. Forest Service in Idaho on July 1, 1911 with 1,802,000 acres (7,290 km^{2}) from parts of Clearwater National Forest and Nez Perce National Forest. On October 29, 1934 the entire forest was divided between Bitterroot, Clearwater, Lolo and Nez Perce, and the name was discontinued.
