= Port Neuf National Forest =

Former national forest in Idaho

Port Neuf National Forest was established by the U.S. Forest Service in Idaho on March 2, 1907, with 99,508 acres (402.69 km^{2}). On July 1, 1908, the forest was combined with Pocatello National Forest and the name was discontinued. The lands are presently included in Caribou National Forest.
