= Lemhi National Forest =

National Forest in Idaho, United States

Lemhi National Forest was established as the Lemhi Forest Reserve by the U.S. Forest Service in Idaho on November 5, 1906 with 1,344,800 acres (5,442 km^{2}). It became a National Forest on March 4, 1907. On October 8, 1938 the entire forest was divided between Challis National Forest and Salmon National Forest and the name was discontinued.
