= Priest River National Forest =

Former national forest in Idaho and Washington

Priest River National Forest was established as the Priest River Forest Reserve by the United States General Land Office in Idaho and Washington on February 22, 1897 with 645,120 acres (2,610.7 km^{2}). After the transfer of federal forests to the U.S. Forest Service in 1905, it became a National Forest on March 4, 1907. On July 1, 1908 the entire forest was divided to establish Kaniksu National Forest and Pend Oreille National Forest and the name was discontinued.
