= Pocatello National Forest =

Former National Forest of the United States

Pocatello National Forest was established as the Pocatello Forest Reserve by the United States General Land Office in Idaho and Utah on September 5, 1903, with 49,920 acres (202.0 km^{2}). After the transfer of federal forests to the U.S. Forest Service in 1905, it became a National Forest on March 4, 1907. On July 1, 1908, Port Neuf National Forest and part of Bear River National Forest were added. On July 1, 1915, the entire forest was transferred to Cache National Forest and the name was discontinued. The lands are presently included in Caribou National Forest and Uinta-Wasatch-Cache National Forest.
