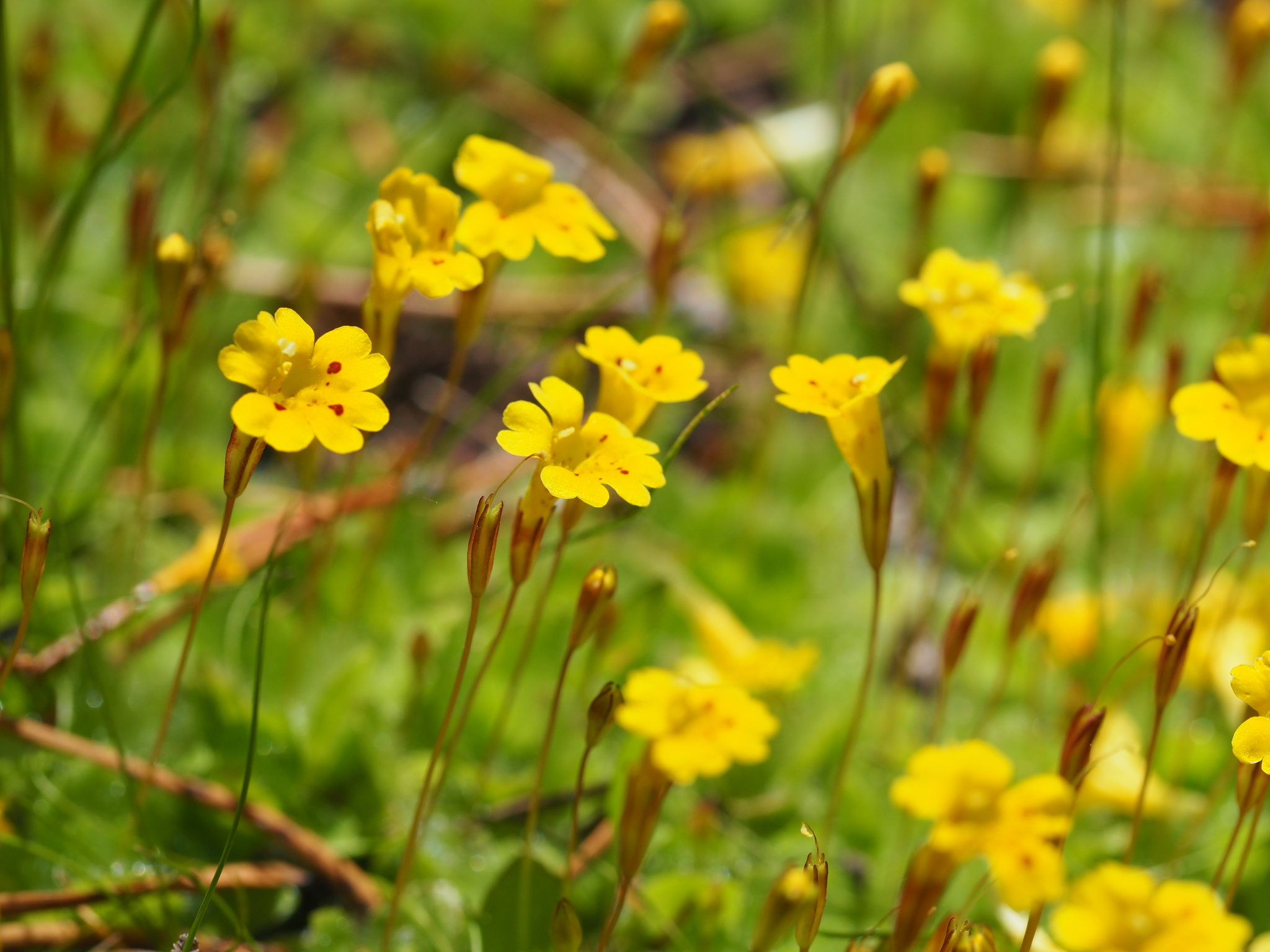
- Sequoia National Forest, 2020

Conservation status
- Apparently Secure (NatureServe)

Scientific classification
- Kingdom: Plantae
- Clade: Embryophytes
- Clade: Tracheophytes
- Clade: Angiosperms
- Clade: Eudicots
- Clade: Asterids
- Order: Lamiales
- Family: Phrymaceae
- Genus: Erythranthe
- Species: E. primuloides

Binomial name
- Erythranthe primuloides (Benth.) G.L.Nesom & N.S.Fraga

Synonyms
- Mimulus nevadensis Gand.; Mimulus pilosellus Greene; Mimulus primuloides Benth.; Mimulus primuloides var. minimus M.Peck; Mimulus primuloides var. pilosellus (Greene) Smiley

= Erythranthe primuloides =

Species of flowering plant

Erythranthe primuloides is a Western United States perennial plant in the lopseed family (Phrymaceae), known by the common name primrose monkeyflower. It was formerly known as Mimulus primuloides.

== Range and habitat ==
It is native to the western United States, including California. It grows in wet habitat in mountains and plateau areas, such as stream banks. In the eastern Sierra Nevada, it can be found in a very wide range of elevations, from 2,000 to 11,000 feet (610 to 3,350 m).

== Description ==
Erythranthe primuloides is a perennial herb growing in low patches or mosslike mats and spreading via rhizome and stolon.

The stem is no more than about 12 centimeters long. The oppositely arranged leaves are variable in shape, variable in color from green to purple-green, shaggy-hairy to hairless, and up to 5 centimeters long.

The flower arises on an erect pedicel. The tubular base of the flower is encapsulated in a hairless calyx of sepals. The bright yellow flower is up to 2 centimeters long. It is divided into an upper lip with two lobes and a lower lip with three. Each of the three lower lobes are usually dotted with red.
