= Minidoka National Forest =

Former national forest in Idaho and Utah

Coordinates: 42.167°N 114.211°W

Minidoka National Forest was established in Idaho and Utah on July 1, 1908 with 736,407 acres (2,980.13 km^{2}) from consolidation of Cassia National Forest and Raft River National Forest, primarily in Idaho. On July 1, 1953 Minidoka was absorbed by Sawtooth National Forest and is now the Sawtooth's Minidoka Ranger District.
