= Cache National Forest =

National forest in the United States

Coordinates: 41°41′04″N 111°38′04″W

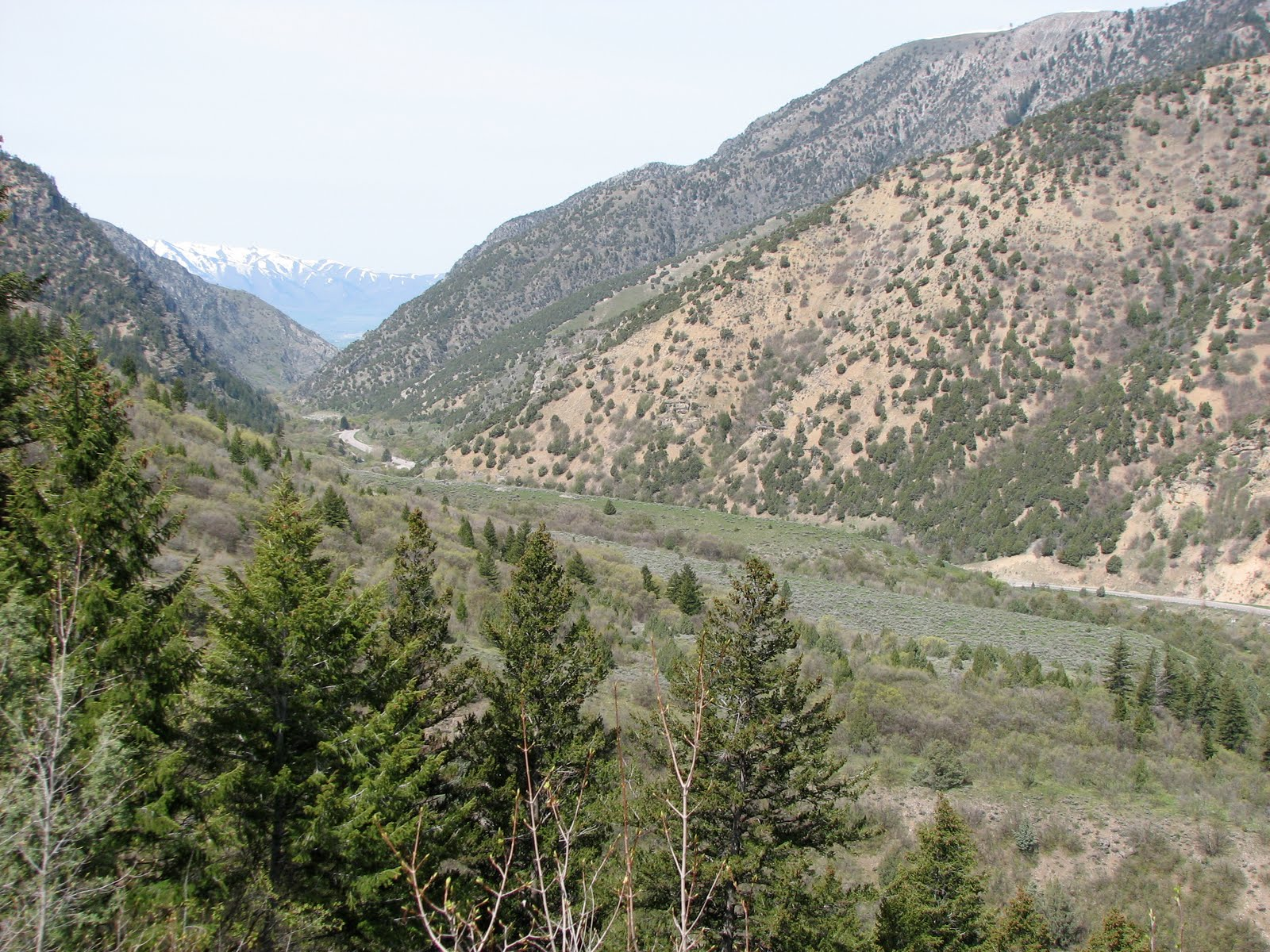
Cache National Forest along U.S. Highway 89 near Logan, Utah

Cache National Forest is a 533,840-acre area of National Forest System land in Idaho and Utah. It was established on July 1, 1908, by the U.S. Forest Service. The majority of its area is in Utah, and was initially created when the Bear River National Forest was disbanded. On July 1, 1915, all of Pocatello National Forest was added. In 1973 the Idaho portion was transferred to the administration of Caribou National Forest, while the Utah portion was combined administratively with Wasatch National Forest, creating the Wasatch-Cache National Forest. In descending order of forestland area, the Cache National Forest portion is located in Cache, Bear Lake, Franklin, Weber, Rich, Box Elder, Caribou, and Morgan counties. (Bear Lake, Franklin, and Caribou counties are in Idaho, and the rest in Utah.) The forest has a current area of 701,453 acres (2,838.68 km^{2}), which comprises 43.56% of the combined Wasatch-Cache's total acreage. The forest is administered from Salt Lake City, Utah as part of the Wasatch-Cache National Forest, but there are local ranger district offices in Logan and Ogden. From circa 1911 until August 1923, the area was roamed by Old Ephraim.

== Wilderness areas ==
There are two officially designated wilderness areas within the former Cache National Forest that are part of the National Wilderness Preservation System.

- Mount Naomi Wilderness
- Wellsville Mountain Wilderness
