= Salmo-Priest Wilderness =

Wilderness area in the northeast corner of Washington state

- IUCN category Ib (wilderness area)
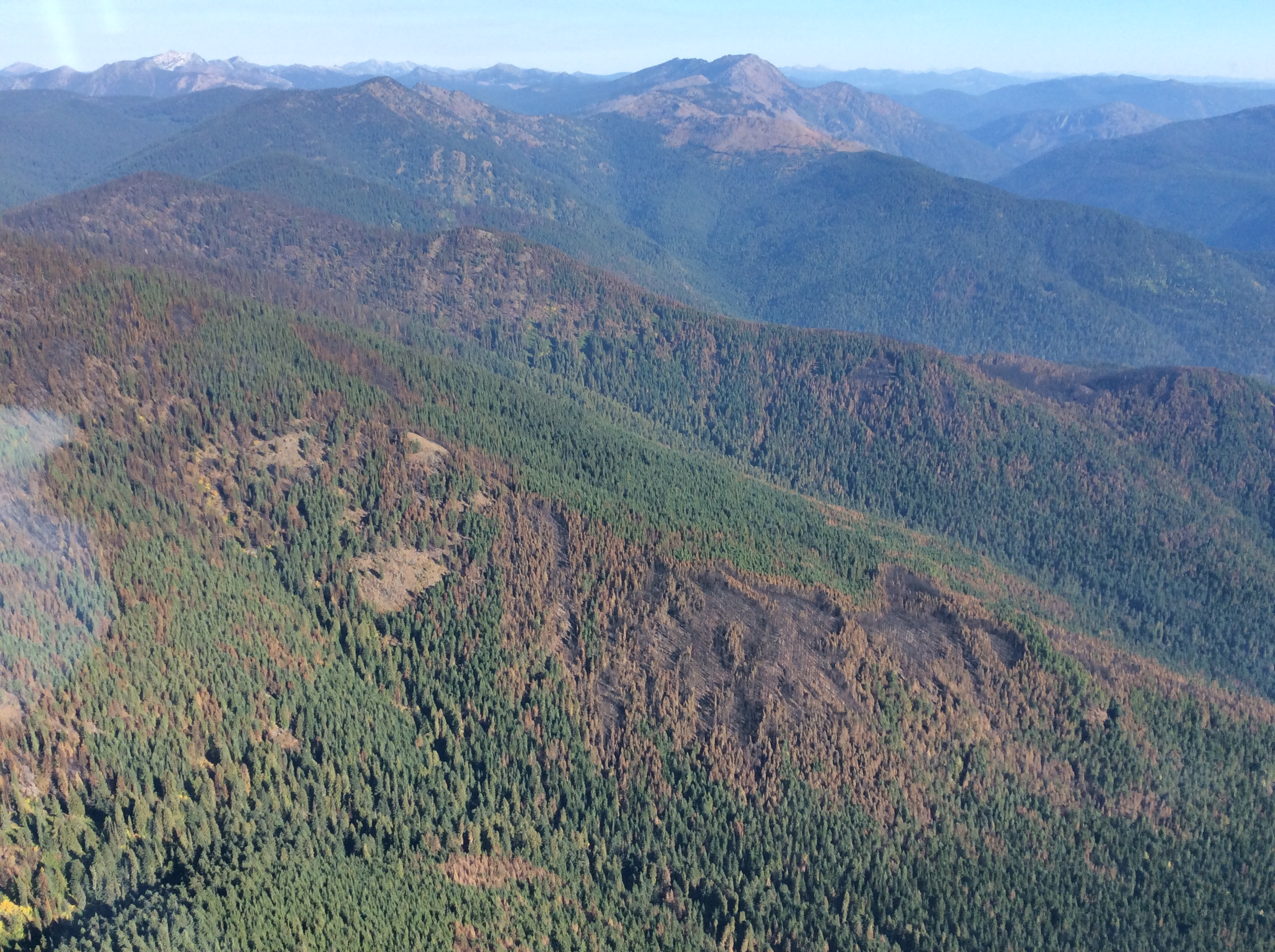

- Location within the United States
- Location: Pend Oreille County, Washington, United States
- Nearest city: Metaline Falls, Washington
- Coordinates: 48°55′40″N 117°10′15″W
- Area: 41,335 acres (167.28 km^{2})
- Established: 1984
- Governing body: U.S. Forest Service

Salmo-Priest Wilderness is a 41,335-acre (16,728 ha) wilderness area located in the Selkirk Mountains in the northeast corner of Washington state, within the Colville National Forest and the Kaniksu National Forest. It was established in 1984.

== History ==
The Salmo-Priest Wilderness was one of 19 new wilderness areas designated under the Washington Wilderness Act, which was signed into federal law in 1984. Its creation was the result of a 20-year campaign by Spokane Mountaineers club president Ray Kresek and local conservationists, who sought to protect the area from logging and development. Salmo-Priest was chosen ahead of a proposal in the Kettle River Range to the west because of its boreal woodland caribou habitat, the last remaining in the contiguous United States.

== Topography ==
The high-country Salmo-Priest Wilderness is a somewhat wishbone-shaped area atop two Selkirk Range ridges that intersect at 6,828-foot (2,081 m) Salmo Mountain. The eastern ridge is somewhat lower, more wooded, more rounded off, and therefore more accessible than the steep-sided, rocky-crested western ridge. Streams have cut deep drainages into both ridges, which flow into Idaho's Priest River on the east and Sullivan Creek and the Salmo River into the Pend Oreille River on the west.

== Climate ==
The Salmo-Priest Wilderness receives 45 to 55 inches of precipitation each year. Winters are long and snowy, with snow not leaving the ground until July in some areas.

== Wildlife ==
This rugged area is home to several endangered and threatened species, including woodland caribou, grizzly bears, and gray wolves. The Selkirk Mountains are the last remaining refuge for woodland caribou in the contiguous United States, particularly the Salmo-Priest Wilderness. Common wildlife include mule deer, white-tailed deer, elk, black bears, cougars, bobcats, badgers, pine martens, lynx, bighorn sheep, and moose.

== Vegetation ==
Vegetation in the Salmo-Priest Wilderness is primarily dominated by Subalpine Fir Zone with Alpine zones on the ridgelines, and Western Red Cedar/Western Hemlock in valley bottoms (primarily of the South Salmo River). The wilderness contains the largest old growth forest in eastern Washington. Tree species include western red cedar, western hemlock, Douglas fir, ponderosa pine, grand fir, western larch, subalpine fir, whitebark pine, Engelmann spruce, quaking aspen, and cottonwood. Plant association groups include Pseudotsuga menziesii/Symphoricarpos albus, Abies lasiocarpa/Clintonia uniflora, Abies lasiocarpa/Rhododendron albiflorum, Abies lasiocarpa/Rhododendron albiflorum-Xerophyllum tenax, Abies lasiocarpa/Xerophyllum tenax, Tsuga heterophylla/CUntonia uniflora, Tsuga heterophylla/Gymnocarpium dryopteris, Tsuga heterophylla/Menziesia ferruginea, Tsuga heterophylla/Rubus pedatus, Tsuga heterophylla/Xerophyllum tenax, Thuja plicata/Clintonia uniflora, Thuja plicata/Vaccinium membranaceum, and Pinus albicaulis.

In late-summer both the wildflowers and huckleberries on the ridges are spectacular.

== Other protected areas ==
The Pacific Northwest National Scenic Trail traverses the Salmo-Priest Wilderness. Approximately 23 miles of the 1,200 mile PNT lie within the wilderness. The 29.7-mile (47.8 km) Shedroof Divide Trail, designated a National Recreation Trail in 1981, also lies in the wilderness.

While the officially designated Salmo-Priest Wilderness ends at the Idaho border, the 20,000 acre Salmo/Priest Inventoried Roadless Area borders the wilderness. In Washington, three Inventoried Roadless Areas also border the wilderness, some of which are recommended wilderness in the 2019 Colville National Forest Land Management Plan. The area of contiguous Inventoried Roadless Areas and Wilderness is approximately 75,000 acres.

== See also ==
- List of U.S. wilderness areas
- Wilderness Act
- List of old growth forests
