= Cassia National Forest =

Protected land in Idaho, United States

Coordinates: 42.167°N 114.211°W

Cassia National Forest was established as the Cassia Forest Reserve in Idaho by the U.S. Forest Service on June 12, 1905, with 326,260 acres (1,320.3 km^{2}). It became a National Forest on March 4, 1907. On July 1, 1908, it was combined with Raft River National Forest to establish Minidoka National Forest, when the name was discontinued. The land is now part of Sawtooth National Forest.
