= St. Joe National Forest =

National Forest in Idaho, US

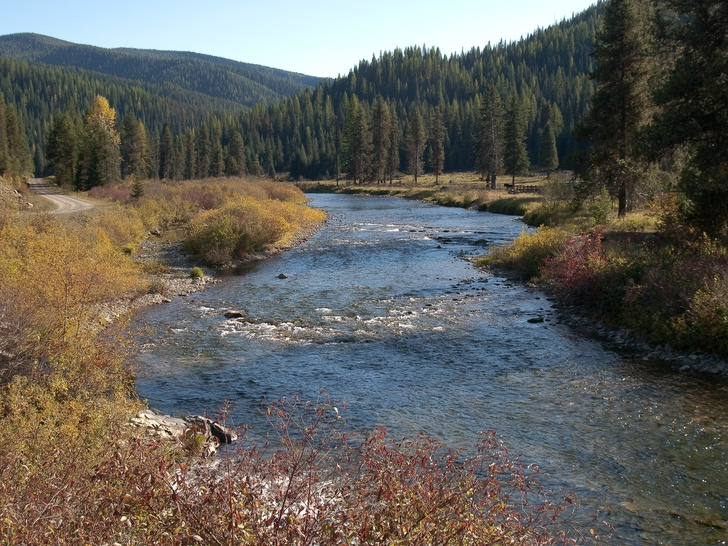
- St. Joe River in St. Joe National Forest

- Location within the United States
- Location: Idaho, United States
- Nearest city: Coeur d'Alene, ID
- Coordinates: 47°10′08″N 115°40′08″W
- Area: 867,882 acres (3,512.19 km^{2})
- Established: July 1, 1908
- Governing body: U.S. Forest Service
- Website: Idaho Panhandle National Forests

The St. Joe National Forest is a U.S. National Forest located in the Idaho panhandle and is one of three forests that are aggregated into the Idaho Panhandle National Forests (the other two are the Coeur d'Alene and Kaniksu National Forests). In descending order of land area St. Joe National Forest is located in parts of Shoshone, Latah, Clearwater, and Benewah counties. It has a total area of 867,882 acres (3,512 km^{2}).

== Description ==
St. Joe is home to a numerous variety of mammalian species including white-tailed deer, mule deer, raccoon, elk, moose, black bear, grizzly bear, coyote, skunk, timber wolf, cougar, marten, beaver, bobcat, river otter, mink, and wolverine. Bird species include wild turkey, grouse, ravens, blue jays, bald eagle, osprey, golden eagle, California quails, and numerous types of owls.

The forest headquarters is located in Coeur d'Alene, Idaho. There are local ranger district offices located in Avery and St. Maries.

== See also ==
- List of national forests of the United States
