= Kaniksu National Forest =

National forest in the northwestern United States

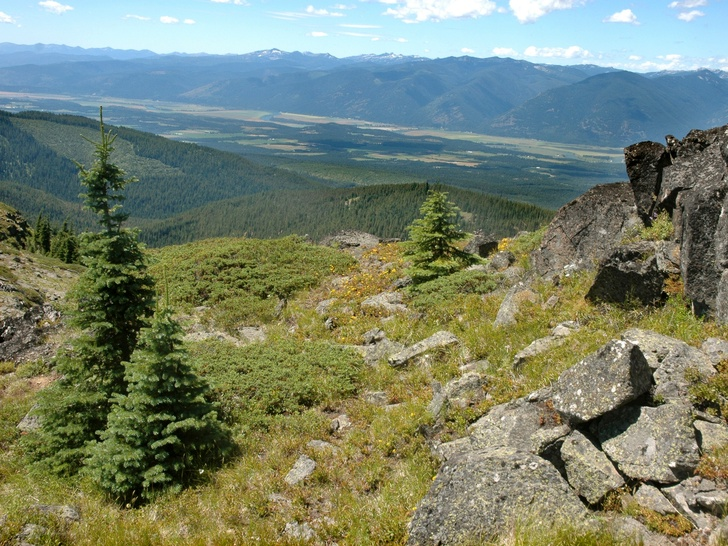
- Kootenai River Valley in Kaniksu National Forest

- Location within the United States
- Location: Idaho / Montana / Washington, United States
- Nearest city: Coeur d'Alene, ID
- Coordinates: 48.317°N 116.152°W
- Area: 1,627,833 acres (6,587.61 km^{2})
- Established: July 1, 1908
- Governing body: U.S. Forest Service
- Website: Idaho Panhandle National Forests

The Kaniksu National Forest (pronounced kə-NIK-soo, /kə.ˈnɪk.su/) is a U.S. National Forest located in northeastern Washington, the Idaho Panhandle, and northwestern Montana. It is one of three forests that are aggregated into the Idaho Panhandle National Forests, along with the Coeur d'Alene National Forest and St. Joe National Forest. Kaniksu National Forest has a total area of 1,627,833 acres (6,587.6 km^{2}). About 55.7% is in Idaho, 27.9% in Montana, and 16.4% in Washington.

The name Kaniksu is from a Kalispel Indian word which means "black robe." It was used to refer to the Jesuit missionaries who brought their faith to North Idaho and Eastern Washington.

== History ==
Kaniksu National Forest was established on July 1, 1908, from a portion of Priest River National Forest. On September 30, 1933, a portion of Pend Oreille National Forest was added, and on July 1, 1954, part of Cabinet National Forest was added. Kaniksu was administratively combined with Coeur d'Alene and St. Joe National Forests on July 1, 1973.

The forest headquarters are located in Coeur d'Alene, Idaho. There are local ranger district offices located in Bonners Ferry, Priest Lake, and Sandpoint (all in Idaho).

A portion of the Salmo-Priest Wilderness lies within Kaniksu National Forest; however, most of it lies within neighboring Colville National Forest, to the west. Also, a portion (47%) of the Cabinet Mountains Wilderness lies within Kaniksu, with most of it (53%) lying within Kootenai National Forest to its north.

== Counties ==
In descending order of land area

- Boundary County, Idaho
- Sanders County, Montana
- Bonner County, Idaho
- Pend Oreille County, Washington
- Lincoln County, Montana
- Stevens County, Washington
- Kootenai County, Idaho

== See also ==
- List of national forests of the United States
- List of forests in Montana
