= Cabinet National Forest =

Former national forest in Idaho and Montana, United States

Coordinates: 48°N 116°W

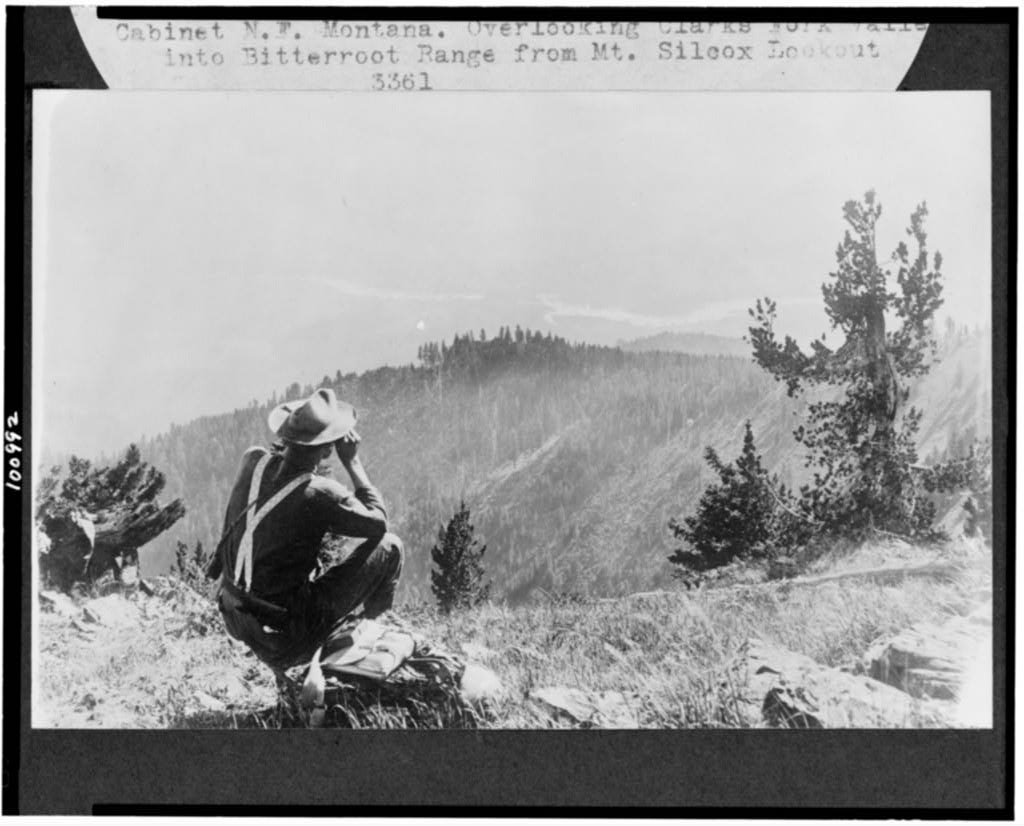

Cabinet National Forest was established in Idaho and Montana by the U.S. Forest Service on March 2, 1907, with 2,060,960 acres (8,340.4 km^{2}), mostly in Montana. On July 1, 1954, it was divided among Kaniksu, Kootenai and Lolo National Forests.

== See also ==
- List of forests in Montana
