= Coeur d'Alene National Forest =

U.S. National Forest in Idaho

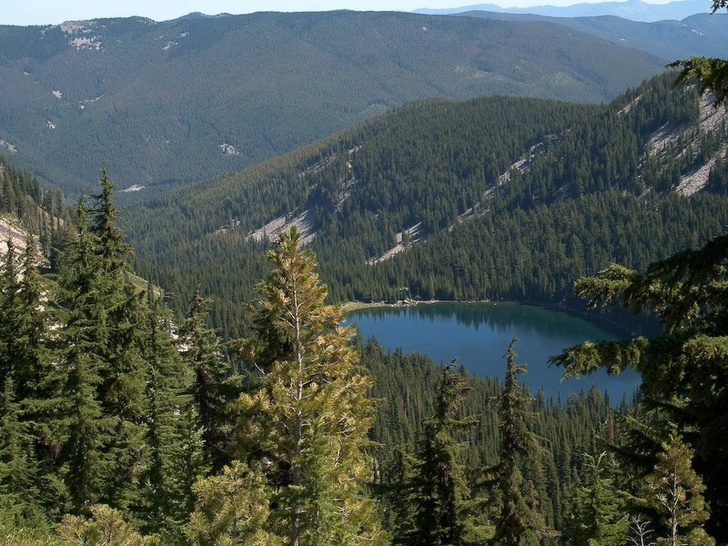
- Revett Lake in Coeur d'Alene National Forest

- Location within the United States
- Location: Idaho, United States
- Nearest city: Coeur d'Alene, Idaho
- Coordinates: 47.8°N 116.3°W
- Area: 726,362 acres (2,939.48 km^{2})
- Established: November 6, 1906
- Governing body: U.S. Forest Service
- Website: Idaho Panhandle National Forests

The Coeur d'Alene National Forest is a U.S. National Forest located in the Idaho panhandle and is one of three forests that are aggregated into the Idaho Panhandle National Forests (the other two are the Kaniksu and St. Joe National Forests). Located in Shoshone, Kootenai, and Bonner counties in northern Idaho, it has a total area of 726,362 acres (1,135 sq mi or 2,940 km^{2}).

The forest headquarters is located in Coeur d'Alene, Idaho. There are local ranger district offices located in Coeur d'Alene and Silverton.

== See also ==
- List of national forests of the United States
