= National Register of Historic Places listings in Clearwater County, Idaho =

Location of Clearwater County in Idaho

This is a list of the National Register of Historic Places listings in Clearwater County, Idaho.

This is intended to be a complete list of the properties and districts on the National Register of Historic Places in Clearwater County, Idaho, United States. Latitude and longitude coordinates are provided for many National Register properties and districts; these locations may be seen together in a map.

There are 9 properties and districts listed on the National Register in the county, including 2 National Historic Landmarks. More may be added; properties and districts nationwide are added to the Register weekly.

This National Park Service list is complete through NPS recent listings posted September 26, 2025.

== Current listings ==
	Name on the Register	Image	Date listed	Location	City or town	Description
1	Brown's Creek CCC Camp Barracks	Brown's Creek CCC Camp Barracks	July 5, 1984 (#84001114)	105 1st St., E. 46°22′34″N 115°56′10″W	Weippe	
2	Lolo Trail	Lolo Trail	October 15, 1966 (#66000309)	Parallel to U.S. Route 12 on ridges of the Bitterroot Mountains, from Lolo Pass to Weippe; 46°38′00″N 114°34′46″W	Weippe	
3	Moore Gulch Chinese Mining Site (10-CW-159)	Moore Gulch Chinese Mining Site (10-CW-159)	January 27, 1983 (#83000285)	Address restricted	Pierce	
4	Nez Perce National Historical Park	Nez Perce National Historical Park	October 15, 1966 (#66000310)	Along U.S. Route 12 southeast of Kamiah; 46°12′39″N 116°00′00″W	Kamiah	One of several separate parts of the Park in Idaho, but the only one listed on the National Register
5	Orofino Historic District	Orofino Historic District	October 29, 1982 (#82000384)	2nd, Dewey, Main, Johnson, and 6th Sts. 46°28′32″N 116°15′06″W	Orofino	
6	Pierce Courthouse	Pierce Courthouse	November 3, 1972 (#72000100)	State Highway 11; 46°29′25″N 115°47′53″W	Pierce	
7	U.S. Post Office – Orofino Main	U.S. Post Office – Orofino Main	March 16, 1989 (#89000133)	320 Michigan Ave. 46°28′49″N 116°15′09″W	Orofino	
8	Weippe Community Hall	Weippe Community Hall	September 23, 2025 (#100012272)	216 East First Street; 46°22′39″N 115°56′13″W	Weippe	
9	Weippe Prairie	Weippe Prairie	October 15, 1966 (#66000311)	South of Weippe and State Highway 11; 46°21′22″N 115°55′21″W	Weippe	

== See also ==
- List of National Historic Landmarks in Idaho
- National Register of Historic Places listings in Idaho
