= Bald Mountain Ski Area =

Ski area in Idaho, United States

Bald Mountain
- Location in the United States Location in Idaho
- Location: Clearwater County, Idaho, U.S.
- Nearest city: Pierce - 10 mi (16 km); Orofino - 28 mi (45 km); Lewiston - 72 mi (116 km)
- Coordinates: 46.57°N 115.87°W
- Vertical: 684 ft (208 m)
- Top elevation: 4,400 ft (1,341 m)
- Base elevation: 3,716 ft (1,133 m); 4,000 ft (1,219 m) main lodge
- Skiable area: 140 acres (0.57 km^{2})
- Trails: 15: 25% easiest; 40% more difficult; 35% most difficult
- Lift system: 1 T-bar, 1 rope tow
- Snowfall: 100 inches (250 cm)
- Snowmaking: none
- Night skiing: none
- Website: Ski Bald Mountain.com

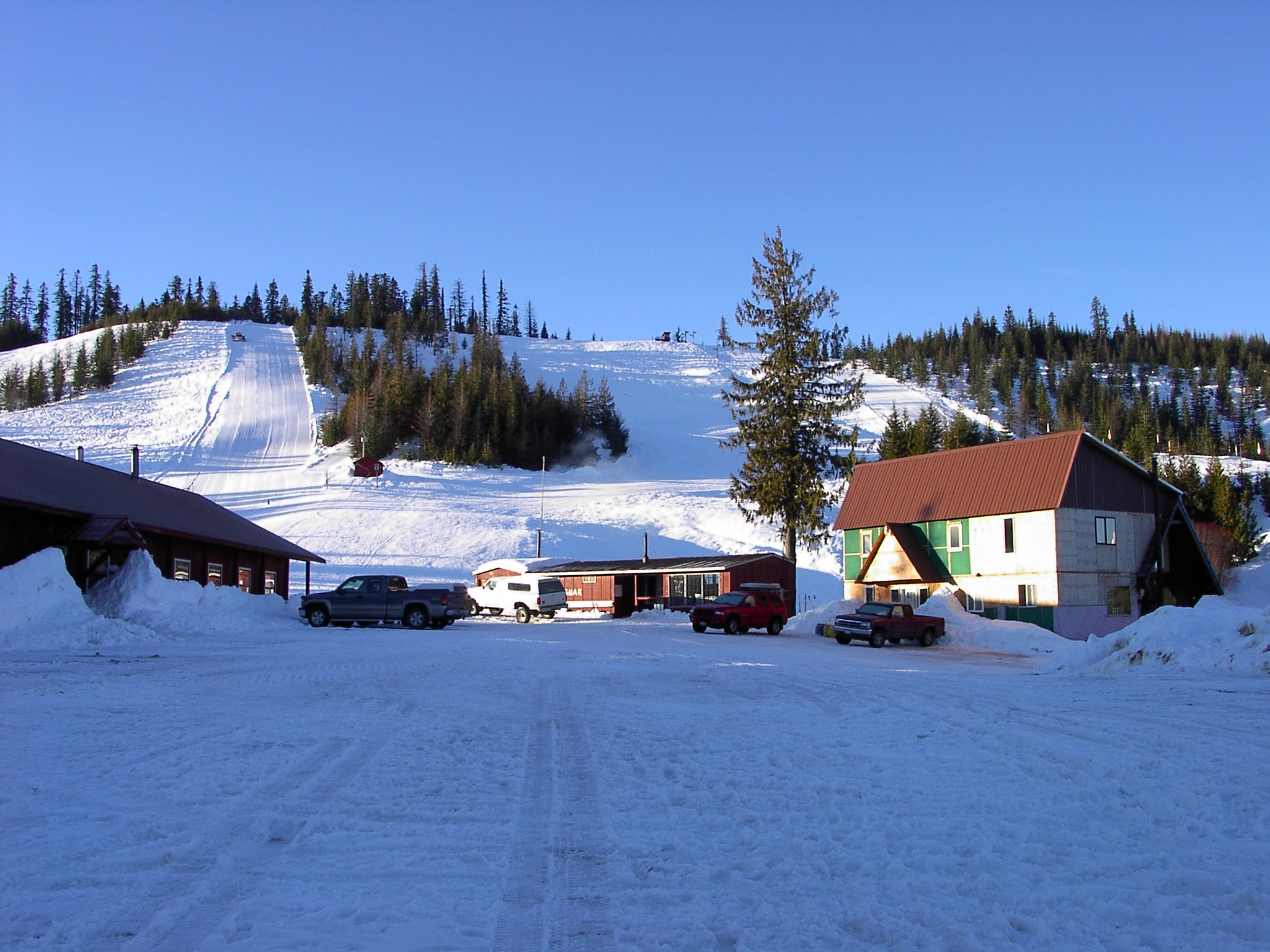
Bald Mountain Ski Area

Bald Mountain Ski Area is a small ski area in north central Idaho, located ten miles (16 km) northwest of Pierce in Clearwater County. The area first opened 66 years ago in January 1960, with a cotton rope tow powered by a gasoline engine. Originally for employees of the Potlatch Corporation (forest products) in the village of Headquarters, it opened to the public in the 1960s.

The summit elevation is 4,400 feet (1,341 m) above sea level, with a vertical drop of 684 feet (208 m). The north-facing slopes are served by two surface lifts: a T-bar and a rope tow, and the main lodge and parking area are at mid-mountain. The area is open only on weekends and the average snowfall is 100 inches (250 cm). The T-bar made its debut in late January 1969, and the A-frame lodge was built in 1971.

This ski area is independent of the much larger Bald Mountain, the primary ski mountain at Sun Valley, a major ski resort in southern Idaho's Blaine County.
