= Greer, Idaho =

Unincorporated community in the state of Idaho, United States

- Unincorporated community
- Location within Idaho Location within the United States
- Coordinates: 46°23′24″N 116°10′31″W
- Country: United States
- State: Idaho
- County: Clearwater
- Elevation: 1,102 ft (336 m)
- Time zone: UTC-8 (Pacific (PST))
  - Summer (DST): UTC-7 (PDT)
- Area codes: 208, 986
- GNIS feature ID: 396591

Greer is an unincorporated community in Clearwater County, Idaho, on the Nez Perce Indian Reservation. Greer is located along the Clearwater River and Idaho State Highway 11, near the junction with U.S. Route 12 (also known as the Northwest Passage Scenic Byway), seven miles (11 km) southeast of Orofino.

The serpentine Highway 11 gains over 2,000 feet (600 m) in elevation up the canyon grade to the Weippe Prairie, where the starving Lewis and Clark Expedition first met the Nez Perce in September 1805, south of present-day Weippe.

== History ==
The former unincorporated community of Fraser was located about three miles (5 km) west of Greer.

Greer's population was 70 in 1960.
