= Idaho State Highway 11 =

State highway in Idaho, United States

State Highway 11
- Gold Rush Historic Byway
- SH-11 highlighted in red

Route information
- Maintained by ITD
- Length: 42.481 mi (68.367 km)

Major junctions
- South end: US 12 in Greer
- North end: Forest Service Roads 246 and 247 near Headquarters

Location
- Country: United States
- State: Idaho

Highway system
- Idaho State Highway System; Interstate; US; State
← SH-9	→ US 12

Idaho State Highway 11 (SH-11) is a state highway in north central Idaho. It runs 42.481 miles (68.37 km) from U.S. Route 12 (US 12) near Greer, north to Forest Service Roads 246 and 247 near Headquarters.

== Route description ==
SH-11 begins at an intersection with US 12 in Lewis County, then heads east across the Clearwater River into Clearwater County, running through Greer, and climbs 2,000 vertical feet (610 m) out of the Clearwater valley in a series of switchbacks. It then heads east, exiting the Nez Perce Indian Reservation, and continues to Weippe, passing a historic marker indicating the point the Lewis and Clark expedition met the Nez Perce.

SH-11 then turns northeast out of Weippe. Shortly before entering Pierce, it passes three historical markers. The first indicates the site of the lynching of five Chinese people in 1885. The second marker indicates Canal Gulch, the site of the first gold strike in Idaho. The third marker indicates the site of the original Orofino.

SH-11 then passes through Pierce and continues generally northeast. It ends at an intersection with National Forest Roads 246 and 247 in Headquarters.

== History ==
The original grade at Greer was a Nez Perce trail. During the Pierce gold rush of 1861, the first wagon roadbed on the grade was built by the Walla Walla–Clearwater Road Co., under a contract with the legislature of Washington Territory. The Idaho Territory was established in March 1863.

== Major intersections ==
County	Location	mi	km	Destinations	Notes
Lewis	Greer	0.000	0.000	US 12 – Orofino	Southern terminus
Clearwater	Headquarters	42.540	68.461	National Forest Roads 246 & 247	Northern terminus
1.000 mi = 1.609 km; 1.000 km = 0.621 mi

== See also ==
- List of state highways in Idaho
- List of highways numbered 11
