= Moore Gulch Chinese Mining Site =

- Moore Gulch Chinese Mining Site (10-CW-159)
- U.S. National Register of Historic Places
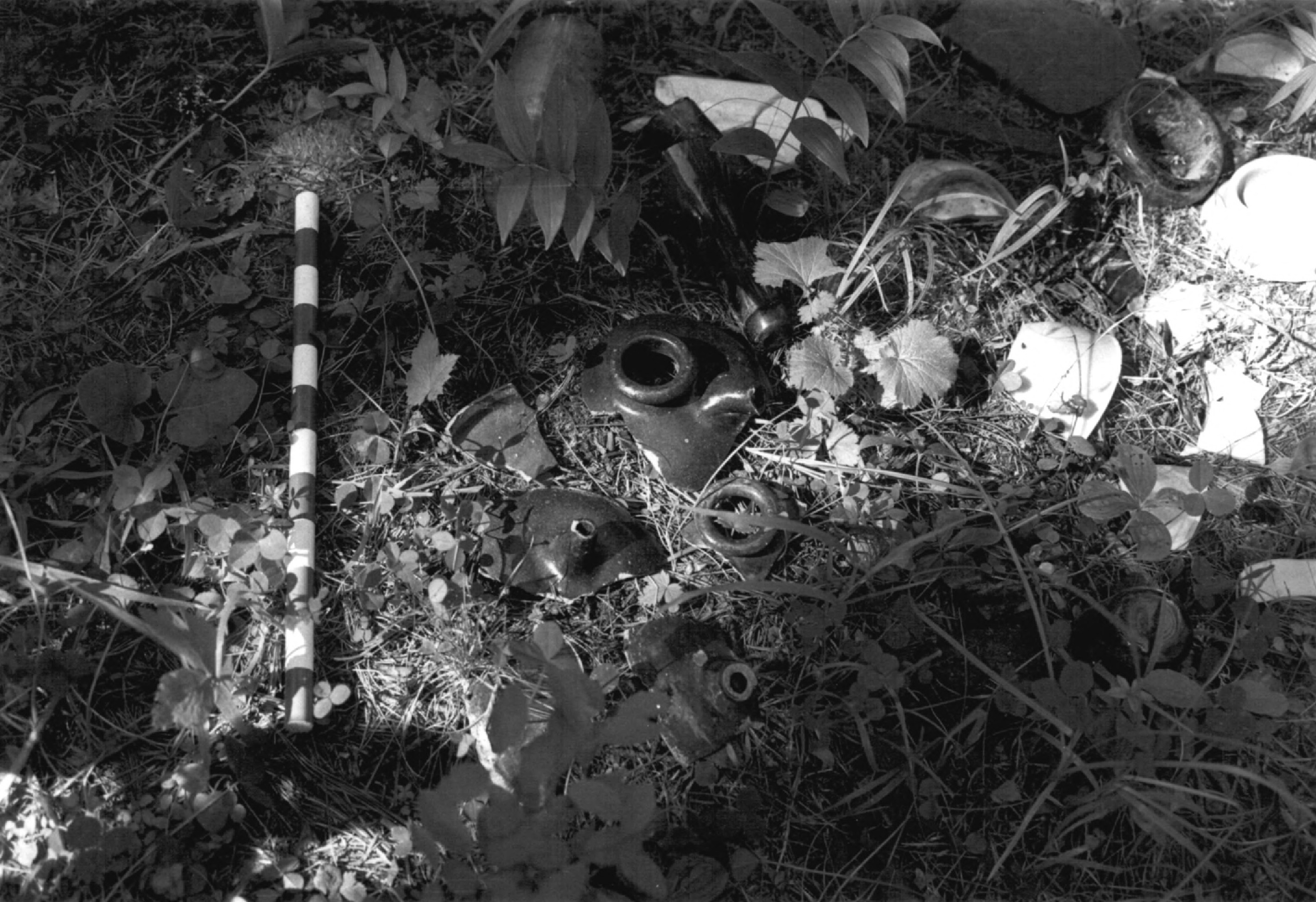
- Nearest city: Pierce, Idaho
- Area: 73 acres (30 ha)
- NRHP reference No.: 83000285
- Added to NRHP: January 27, 1983

The Moore Gulch Chinese Mining Site, site 10-CW-159, is an archeological site in Clearwater County, Idaho which was listed on the National Register of Historic Places in 1983.

The site included 16 contributing structures and one contributing site.

It was studied by archeologists in 1979–1981. The NRHP nomination states:

The site is significant because it represents a complete mining complex containing living quarters, a trash dump, mine tailings, ditches, and the like relative to a Chinese mining community existing from 1870 to 1900. Chinese mining methods, a specialized system of mineral production can be studied here. It also contributes information important to the history of Chinese consumption of American-made goods, their assimilation into the American economy, and their reliance upon the China trade for goods desired but not available on the American market.

== See also ==
- History of Chinese Americans in Idaho
- National Register of Historic Places listings in Clearwater County, Idaho
