= Nez Perce (disambiguation) =

Nez Perce may refer to:

== A people and their customs ==
- Nez Perce people, Native American people living in the Pacific Northwest region of the United States
- Nez Perce language, their language
- Nez Perce War, an 1877 war between the Nez Perce tribe and U.S. Government

== Geographical locations ==
- Nez Perce Traditional Site, Wallowa Lake, a Nez Perce cemetery near Joseph, Oregon
- Nez Perce County, Idaho, a county in Idaho
- Nezperce, Idaho, a city in Lewis County, Idaho
- Nez Perce National Forest, a U.S. National Forest in Idaho
- Nez Perce Peak, a mountain in Grand Teton Nation Park
- Nez Perce Pass, a mountain pass in the Bitterroot mountains of Idaho and Montana
- Fort Nez Percés, a fur trading post in Washington Territory

== Historical locations ==
- Nez Perce National Historical Park, a multi-state U.S. National Historic Park
- Nez Perce National Historic Trail, a trail commemorating the Nez Perce War

== Nomenclature using Nez Perce ==
- Nez Perce Chief (sternwheeler), an 1860–1870s steamboat operating on the Columbia River
- The Nez Perce, a Douglas C-47 transport aircraft that was converted into a glider
- Nez Percé Stake Race, a type of competitive speed event for horses said to be inspired by the Nez Perce tribe
- Nez Perce Horse, a breed of horse used by the Nez Perce tribe

== See also ==
- Nez (disambiguation)
