= Iwetemlaykin State Heritage Site =

State park in Oregon, United States

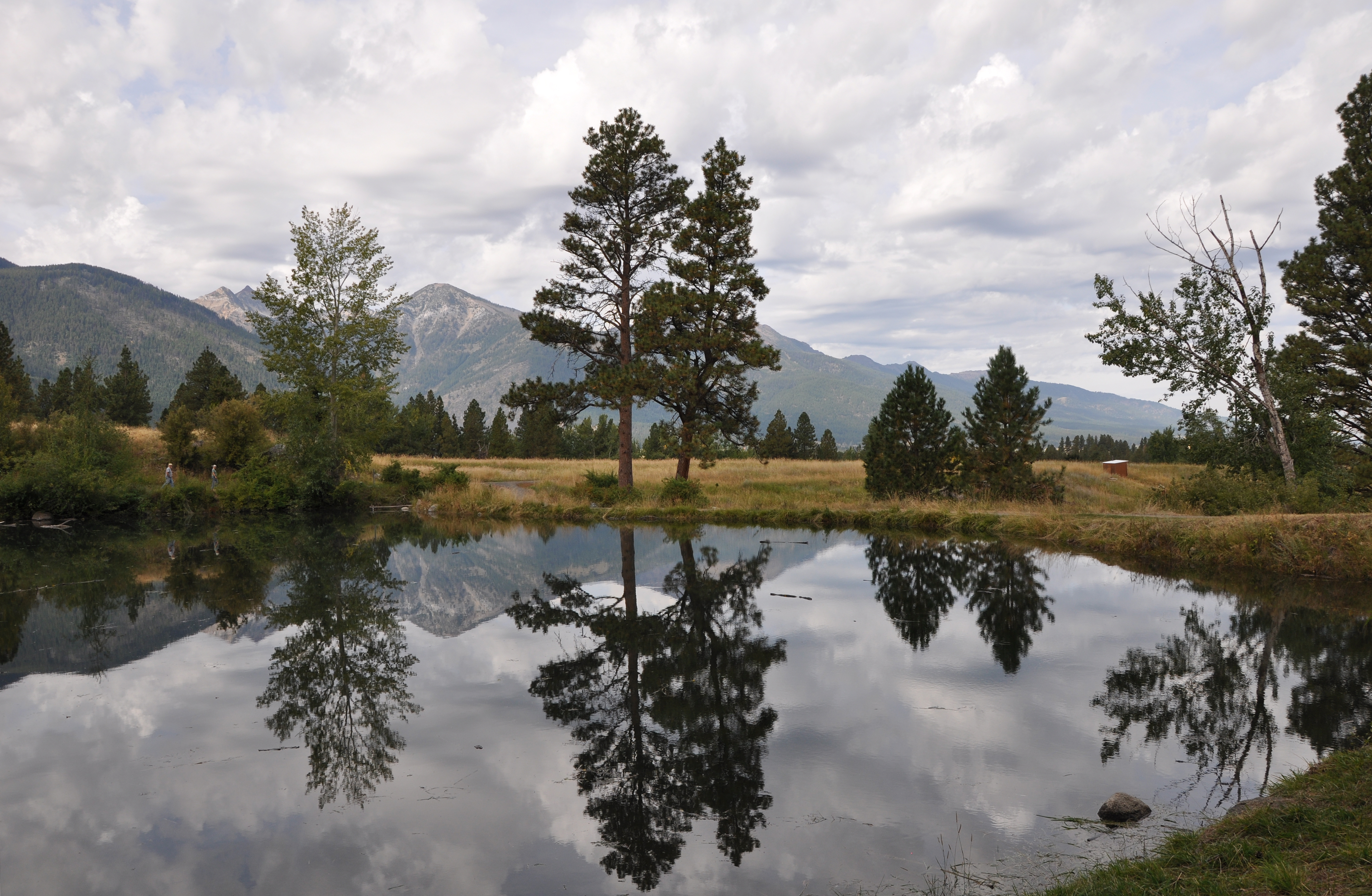
- Knight's Pond at Iwetemlaykin

- Location within Oregon
- Location: Wallowa County, Oregon, United States
- Coordinates: 45°20′30″N 117°13′25″W
- Area: 62 acres (25 ha)
- Established: 2009
- Operator: Oregon Parks and Recreation Department
- Named for: Nez Perce for "at the edge of the lake"
- Website: Iwetemlaykin State Heritage Site

Iwetemlaykin State Heritage Site, a public park in the U.S. state of Oregon, is on the south edge of Joseph, along Oregon Route 351.

== Origin of the name ==
Its name comes from the Nez Perce place name, Iwetemlaykin (pronounced ee-weh-TEMM-lye-kinn), which means "at the edge of the lake". The park, near Wallowa Lake, is adjacent to one of the 38 sites of the Nez Perce National Historical Park, the site of the Old Chief Joseph grave and cemetery.

== Historic landmark ==
Established in 2009, the park lies on 62 acres (25 ha) of land in an area that was once part of the homeland of the Nez Perce. Park amenities include a walking trail, Knight's pond, wildlife watching, native plants, views of the Wallowa Mountains, parking, and a restroom.

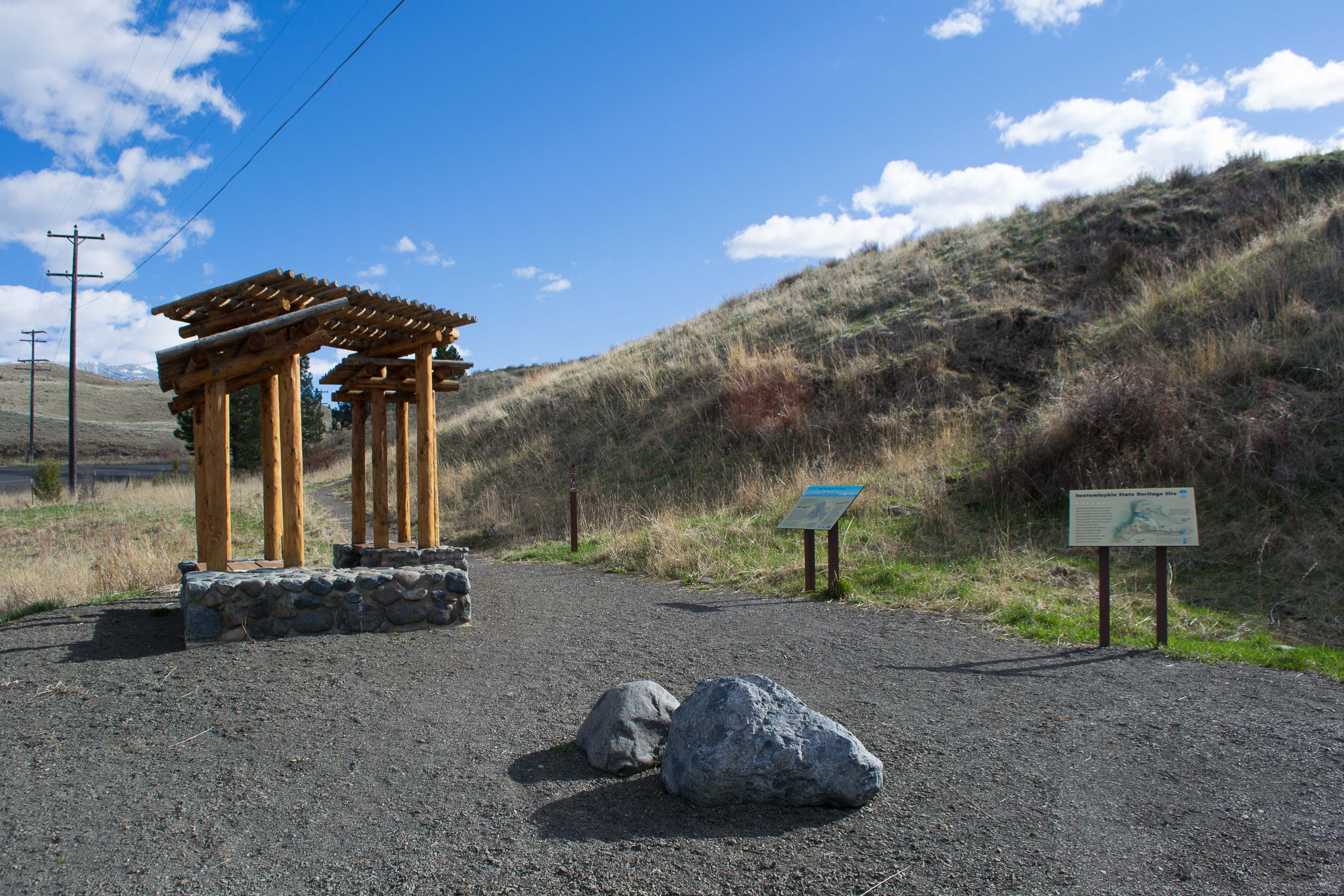
Iwetemlaykin State Heritage Site monument and reader boards

== See also ==
- List of Oregon state parks
- Nez Perce Traditional Site, Wallowa Lake
