= Camp Chopunnish =

Lewis and Clark Expedition camp in Idaho

Coordinates: 46.22246°N 116.00963°W

Camp Chopunnish was the first major camp on the Lewis and Clark Expedition's return voyage. It is located in Idaho County, Idaho, along the north bank of the Clearwater River, it is now part of the Nez Perce National Historical Park. It was named after Lewis' name for the Nez Perces tribe native there. In the expedition journals it was also called Long Camp (because of the duration of the stay) and Camp Kamiah (for its location).

== History ==
The expedition departed Fort Clatsop, near present-day Astoria, Oregon, in March 1806, after a dismal winter near the Pacific coast. By May 3, they had arrived back among the Nez Perce tribe, but determined that because of snow it was too early to cross the mountains on the Lolo Trail over the Bitterroot Mountains. From mid-May to mid-June the expedition stopped at Camp Chopunnish, stocking food for the mountain crossing.

On June 10 the group moved to a camp on Weippe Prairie in preparation for crossing the Lolo Trail, which, after an initial failure, was crossed in the last week in June.

In 1902, when historian Olin D. Wheeler visited the site, he could still see the sunken circular ring where Lewis and Clark had established their camp. Since that time, however, the integrity of the site has been destroyed. A large sawmill now covers it, and numerous other buildings are located in the vicinity. The area may be viewed from an unmarked turnout on U.S. 12 along the opposite, or southside of the river.
