= Cavendish, Idaho =

Unincorporated community in the state of Idaho, United States

Coordinates: 46°33′37″N 116°26′03″W

Cavendish is an unincorporated community in Clearwater County, Idaho, United States, in the mountains between the towns of Orofino and Kendrick. Cavendish contains an elementary school (Cavendish-Teakean Elementary School), a cemetery, and a park (LeBaron Park).

== History ==
Cavendish was said to have gotten its name from a traveler who compared the severity of the weather to Cavendish, Vermont. Cavendish consists mainly of farm ground and small areas of forestry.

Cavendish's population was 13 in 1909, and was 25 in 1960.
