= Clearwater County, Idaho =

County in Idaho, United States

- County
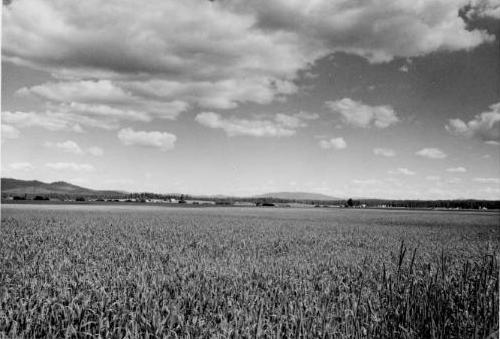
- Weippe Prairie

- Seal

- Location within the U.S. state of Idaho
- Coordinates: 46°40′N 115°40′W
- Country: United States
- State: Idaho
- Founded: February 27, 1911
- Named for: Clearwater River
- Seat: Orofino
- Largest city: Orofino

Area
  - Total: 2,488 sq mi (6,440 km^{2})
  - Land: 2,457 sq mi (6,360 km^{2})
  - Water: 31 sq mi (80 km^{2}) 1.2%

Population (2020)
  - Total: 8,734
  - Estimate (2025): 9,118 ▲
  - Density: 3.555/sq mi (1.372/km^{2})
- Time zone: UTC−8 (Pacific)
  - Summer (DST): UTC−7 (PDT)
- Congressional district: 1st
- Website: www.clearwatercounty.org

Clearwater County is a county located in the U.S. state of Idaho. As of the 2020 census, the population was 8,734. The county seat is Orofino. Established in 1911, the county was named after the Clearwater River. The county is home to North Fork of the Clearwater River, and a small portion of the South Fork and the main Clearwater. Also in the county are the Dworshak Reservoir, Dworshak State Park, Dworshak National Fish Hatchery, and the Dworshak Dam, third highest in the U.S. The modest Bald Mountain ski area is located between Orofino and Pierce.

== History ==
The Clearwater River and Lolo Pass, in the southeast corner of the county, were made famous by the exploration of Lewis and Clark in the early 19th century. Following an arduous trek through the Bitterroot Mountains, suffering through a mid-September snowstorm and near starvation, the Corps of Discovery expedition camped with the Nez Perce tribe on the Weippe Prairie outside of present-day Weippe in 1805. With the assistance of the Nez Perce, the expedition recuperated and constructed burned-out canoes at Canoe Camp in October 1805 and then paddled down the Clearwater, Snake, and Columbia rivers and met the Pacific Ocean a month later at present-day Astoria, Oregon.

Elias D. Pierce and Wilbur F. Bassett made the first discovery of gold in Idaho, on Orofino Creek (Canal Gulch) in 1860, 1 mile (2 km) north of present-day Pierce.

Until 1904, Clearwater County was part of Shoshone County to the north. It was annexed by Nez Perce County for several years and then was established as a new county in 1911. The original county seat of Shoshone County was Pierce, in today's Clearwater County. It was the first gold rush area of present-day Idaho (then Washington Territory) in 1860 and was made the county seat of a vast Shoshone County in 1861, two years prior to the establishment of the Idaho Territory. When the Silver Valley population rose dramatically in the 1880s, the seat was moved to Murray in 1884 (and to Wallace in 1898) to better serve the majority of the county's population. The population of the southern area increased with homesteading in the Weippe area in the late 1890s. The vast distance and time required for travel to Wallace from the Clearwater River area prompted the move of the southern portion to Nez Perce County.

== Geography ==
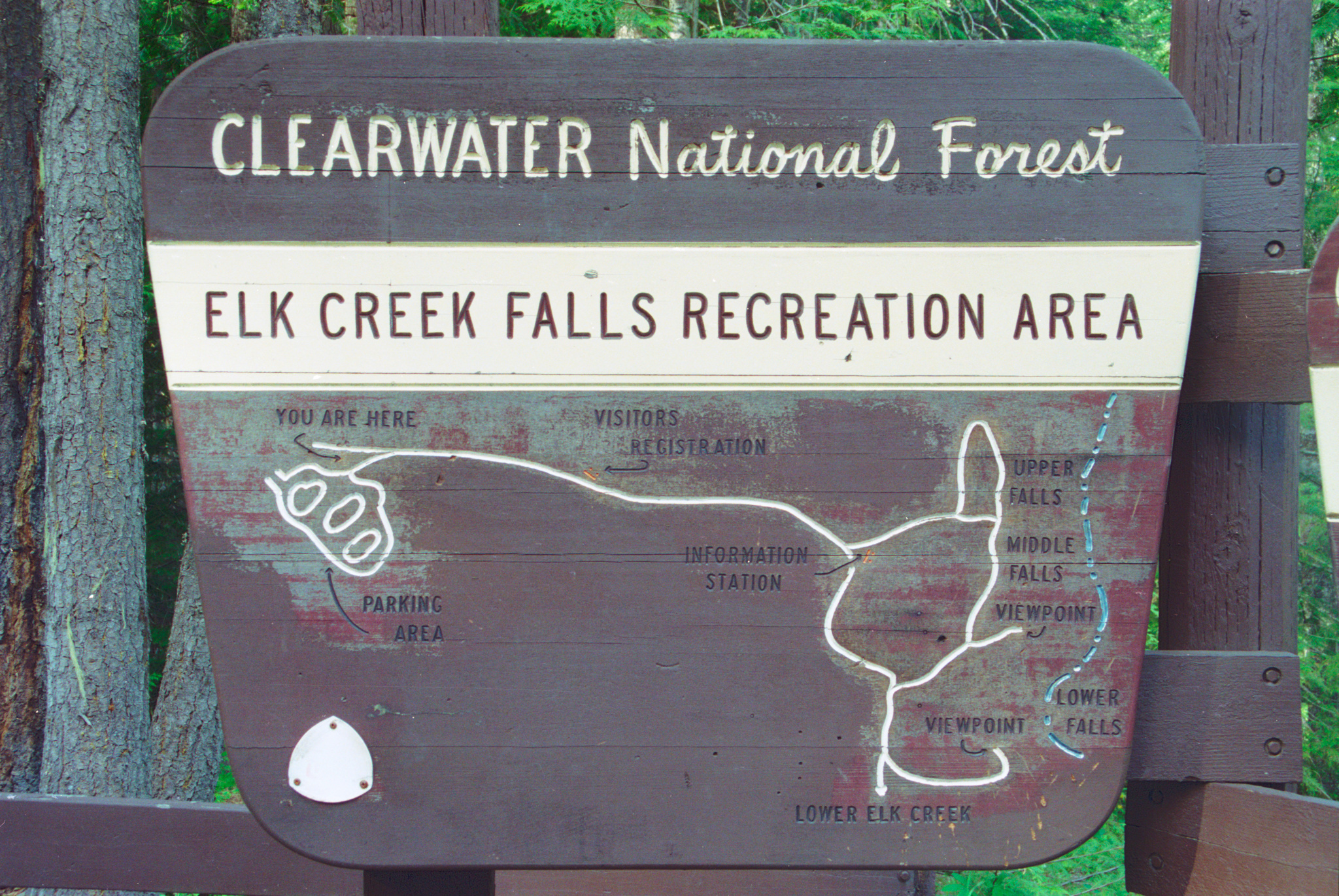
Elk Creek Falls

According to the U.S. Census Bureau, the county has a total area of 2,488 square miles (6,440 km^{2}), of which 2,457 square miles (6,360 km^{2}) is land and 31 square miles (80 km^{2}) (1.2%) is water. It is part of the Palouse, a wide and rolling prairie-like region of the middle Columbia basin.

=== Adjacent counties ===
- Shoshone County – north
- Mineral County, Montana – northeast/Mountain Time Border
- Missoula County, Montana– east/Mountain Time Border
- Idaho County – south
- Lewis County – southwest
- Nez Perce County – southwest
- Latah County – west

=== Major highways ===
- US-12
- SH-7
- SH-8
- SH-11

=== National protected areas ===
- Clearwater National Forest (part)
  - Mallard-Larkins Pioneer Area
  - Lolo Trail National Historic Landmark (part)
- Nez Perce National Historical Park (part)
  - Canoe Camp
  - Musselshell Meadow
  - Pierce Courthouse
  - Weippe Prairie
- St. Joe National Forest (part)

=== Ski area ===
- Bald Mountain Ski Area

== Government and infrastructure ==
The Idaho Department of Correction operates the Idaho Correctional Institution-Orofino in Orofino.

== Demographics ==
Historical population
Census	Pop.	Note	%±
1920	4,993		—
1930	6,599		32.2%
1940	8,243		24.9%
1950	8,217		−0.3%
1960	8,548		4.0%
1970	10,871		27.2%
1980	10,390		−4.4%
1990	8,505		−18.1%
2000	8,930		5.0%
2010	8,761		−1.9%
2020	8,734		−0.3%
2025 (est.)	9,118	▲	4.4%
U.S. Decennial Census; 1790–1960 1900–1990; 1990–2000 2010–2020 2020

=== Racial and ethnic composition ===
Clearwater County, Idaho – Racial and ethnic composition Note: the US Census treats Hispanic/Latino as an ethnic category. This table excludes Latinos from the racial categories and assigns them to a separate category. Hispanics/Latinos may be of any race.
Race / Ethnicity (NH = Non-Hispanic)	Pop 1980	Pop 1990	Pop 2000	Pop 2010	Pop 2020	% 1980	% 1990	% 2000	% 2010	% 2020
White alone (NH)	10,141	8,191	8,378	8,063	7,882	97.60%	96.31%	93.82%	92.03%	90.25%
Black or African American alone (NH)	2	8	13	16	40	0.02%	0.09%	0.15%	0.18%	0.46%
Native American or Alaska Native alone (NH)	156	175	177	184	133	1.50%	2.06%	1.98%	2.10%	1.52%
Asian alone (NH)	18	19	31	61	45	0.17%	0.22%	0.35%	0.70%	0.52%
Native Hawaiian or Pacific Islander alone (NH)	x	x	5	9	2	x	x	0.06%	0.10%	0.02%
Other race alone (NH)	2	0	4	5	35	0.02%	0.00%	0.04%	0.06%	0.40%
Mixed race or Multiracial (NH)	x	x	157	155	297	x	x	1.76%	1.77%	3.40%
Hispanic or Latino (any race)	71	112	165	268	300	0.68%	1.32%	1.85%	3.06%	3.43%
Total	10,390	8,505	8,930	8,761	8,734	100.00%	100.00%	100.00%	100.00%	100.00%

=== 2020 census ===
As of the 2020 census, the county had a population of 8,734, a median age of 52.1 years, 16.4% of residents were under the age of 18, 29.0% were 65 years of age or older, and there were 120.4 males for every 100 females (121.0 males per 100 females age 18 and over). The population density was 3.6 people per square mile.

The racial makeup of the county was 91.2% White, 0.5% Black or African American, 1.7% American Indian and Alaska Native, 0.5% Asian, 0.0% Native Hawaiian and Pacific Islander, 1.4% from some other race, and 4.7% from two or more races. Hispanic or Latino residents of any race comprised 3.4% of the population.

There were 3,634 households in the county, of which 20.5% had children under the age of 18 living with them and 19.0% had a female householder with no spouse or partner present. About 29.7% of all households were made up of individuals and 16.3% had someone living alone who was 65 years of age or older.

There were 4,552 housing units, of which 20.2% were vacant. Among occupied housing units, 78.4% were owner-occupied and 21.6% were renter-occupied. The homeowner vacancy rate was 1.5% and the rental vacancy rate was 7.4%. 0.0% of residents lived in urban areas, while 100.0% lived in rural areas.

=== 2010 census ===
As of the 2010 United States census, there were 8,761 people, 3,660 households, and 2,397 families living in the county. The population density was 3.6 inhabitants per square mile (1.4/km^{2}). There were 4,453 housing units at an average density of 1.8 units per square mile (0.69 units/km^{2}). The racial makeup of the county was 93.9% white, 2.2% American Indian, 0.7% Asian, 0.2% black or African American, 0.1% Pacific islander, 0.8% from other races, and 2.1% from two or more races. Those of Hispanic or Latino origin made up 3.1% of the population. In terms of ancestry, 29.3% were German, 17.8% were Irish, 13.8% were English, 6.7% were American, and 6.2% were Norwegian.

Of the 3,660 households, 22.8% had children under the age of 18 living with them, 54.7% were married couples living together, 6.4% had a female householder with no husband present, 34.5% were non-families, and 29.3% of all households were made up of individuals. The average household size was 2.23 and the average family size was 2.71. The median age was 49.0 years.

The median income for a household in the county was $41,835 and the median income for a family was $46,415. Males had a median income of $42,568 versus $30,048 for females. The per capita income for the county was $20,507. About 9.0% of families and 11.7% of the population were below the poverty line, including 14.7% of those under age 18 and 7.6% of those age 65 or over.

=== 2000 census ===
As of the census of 2000, there were 8,930 people, 3,456 households, and 2,481 families living in the county. The population density was 3.6 people per square mile (1.4 people/km^{2}). There were 4,144 housing units at an average density of 2 units per square mile (0.77 units/km^{2}). The racial makeup of the county was 94.82% White, 0.15% Black or African American, 2.03% Native American, 0.37% Asian, 0.06% Pacific Islander, 0.63% from other races, and 1.96% from two or more races. 1.85% of the population were Hispanic or Latino of any race. 24.0% were of German, 14.0% English, 11.7% Irish and 10.5% American ancestry.

There were 3,456 households, out of which 28.90% had children under the age of 18 living with them, 60.50% were married couples living together, 6.90% had a female householder with no husband present, and 28.20% were non-families. 24.00% of all households were made up of individuals, and 10.00% had someone living alone who was 65 years of age or older. The average household size was 2.41 and the average family size was 2.84.

In the county, the population was spread out, with 23.00% under the age of 18, 5.90% from 18 to 24, 26.30% from 25 to 44, 29.20% from 45 to 64, and 15.60% who were 65 years of age or older. The median age was 42 years. For every 100 females there were 113.40 males. For every 100 females age 18 and over, there were 115.90 males.

The median income for a household in the county was $32,071, and the median income for a family was $37,259. Males had a median income of $31,426 versus $21,694 for females. The per capita income for the county was $15,463. About 9.70% of families and 13.50% of the population were below the poverty line, including 18.90% of those under age 18 and 8.20% of those age 65 or over.

== Communities ==
=== Cities ===
- Elk River
- Orofino
- Pierce
- Weippe

=== Unincorporated communities ===
- Ahsahka
- Cardiff
- Cavendish
- Dent
- Grangemont
- Greer
- Headquarters
- Hollywood
- Judge Town
- Konkolville
- Moose City
- Teakean

=== Ghost town ===
- Fraser

=== Population ranking ===
The population ranking of the following table is based on the 2010 census of Clearwater County.

† county seat

Rank	City/Town/etc.	Municipal type	Population (2010 Census)
1	† Orofino	City	3,142
2	Pierce	City	508
3	Weippe	City	441
4	Elk River	City	125

== Politics ==
United States presidential election results for Clearwater County, Idaho
Year	Republican		Democratic		Third party(ies)	
Year	No.	%	No.	%	No.	%
1912	373	23.71%	549	34.90%	651	41.39%
1916	839	47.37%	678	38.28%	254	14.34%
1920	947	66.22%	482	33.71%	1	0.07%
1924	946	47.47%	725	36.38%	322	16.16%
1928	1,195	57.62%	852	41.08%	27	1.30%
1932	822	32.20%	1,699	66.55%	32	1.25%
1936	812	27.75%	1,959	66.95%	155	5.30%
1940	1,128	32.90%	2,284	66.61%	17	0.50%
1944	865	32.94%	1,744	66.41%	17	0.65%
1948	820	32.17%	1,571	61.63%	158	6.20%
1952	1,494	44.91%	1,826	54.88%	7	0.21%
1956	1,508	42.70%	2,024	57.30%	0	0.00%
1960	1,193	33.14%	2,407	66.86%	0	0.00%
1964	767	23.87%	2,446	76.13%	0	0.00%
1968	1,287	37.11%	1,838	53.00%	343	9.89%
1972	1,590	50.67%	1,412	45.00%	136	4.33%
1976	1,469	44.01%	1,752	52.49%	117	3.51%
1980	2,178	50.49%	1,699	39.38%	437	10.13%
1984	2,176	56.55%	1,608	41.79%	64	1.66%
1988	1,659	45.87%	1,861	51.45%	97	2.68%
1992	1,152	30.87%	1,433	38.40%	1,147	30.73%
1996	1,658	42.70%	1,507	38.81%	718	18.49%
2000	2,885	74.05%	841	21.59%	170	4.36%
2004	2,839	70.38%	1,117	27.69%	78	1.93%
2008	2,569	65.77%	1,211	31.00%	126	3.23%
2012	2,541	68.75%	1,032	27.92%	123	3.33%
2016	2,852	75.03%	704	18.52%	245	6.45%
2020	3,453	78.14%	877	19.85%	89	2.01%
2024	3,550	80.32%	774	17.51%	96	2.17%

== See also ==
- National Register of Historic Places listings in Clearwater County, Idaho
