= Nez Perce National Historical Park =

Series of federally protected historic sites in the northwestern United States

- IUCN category III (natural monument or feature)
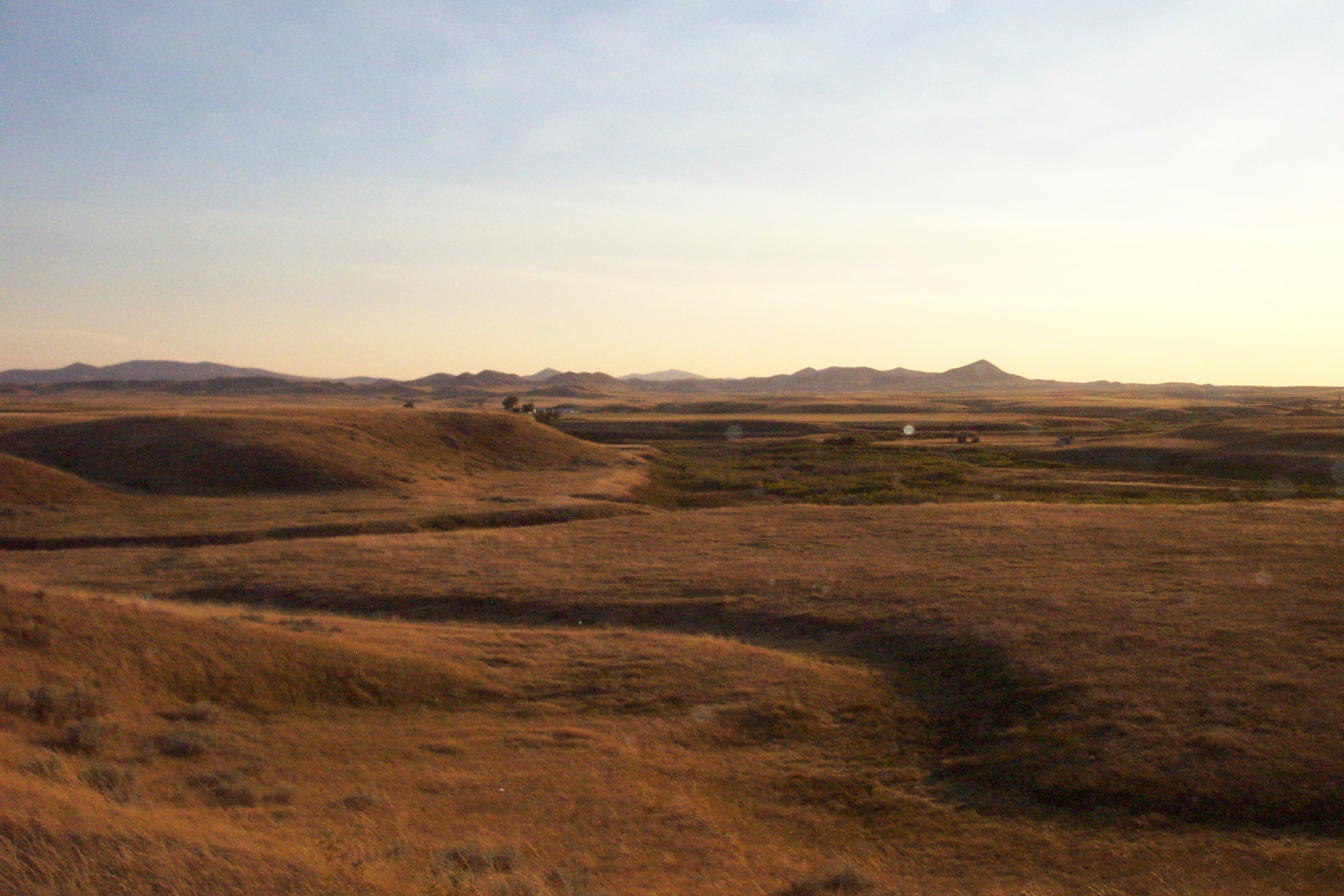
- Bear Paw Battlefield in Montana

- Location within the United States Location within Idaho
- Location: Idaho, Montana, Oregon, Washington, United States
- Nearest city: Lewiston, Idaho
- Coordinates: 46°26′49″N 116°49′23″W
- Area: 4,561 acres (18.46 km^{2})
- Established: May 15, 1965
- Visitors: 344,517 (in 2022)
- Governing body: National Park Service
- Website: Nez Perce National Historical Park

The Nez Perce National Historical Park is a United States National Historical Park comprising 38 sites located across the states of Idaho, Montana, Oregon, and Washington, which include traditional aboriginal lands of the Nez Perce people. The sites are strongly associated with the resistance of Chief Joseph and his band, who in June 1877 migrated from Oregon in an attempt to reach freedom in Canada and avoid being forced on to a reservation. They were pursued by U.S. Army cavalry forces and fought numerous skirmishes against them during the so-called Nez Perce War, which eventually ended with Chief Joseph's surrender in the Montana Territory.

Nez Perce National Historical Park was established in 1965, and a museum was opened at the park headquarters in Spalding, Idaho, in 1983. The 38 discontiguous sites span three main ecoregions, covering a wide range of elevations and climate. Numerous animal species inhabit the park areas, including several that are considered sensitive.

== History ==
The park commemorates the history, culture, and stories of the Nez Perce. It includes sites associated with the Nez Perce War of 1877, when the people resisted takeover by the United States, and the flight of Chief Joseph and his band. The park is administered overall by the National Park Service, and a number of the sites are managed by other federal and state agencies as well as local communities; the park's headquarters are located in Spalding, Idaho, east of Lewiston.

The park was established by Congress in 1965. Construction of the planned headquarters site and museum at Spalding were delayed by land acquisition and federal funding problems. Soon after construction began in September 1979, Native American graves were discovered at the site; remains and artifacts were preserved in consultation with the Nez Perce. Construction of the visitor center and museum was later restarted, and the museum opened in June 1983.

== Sites ==
The Nez Perce National Historic Park does not follow the format of most national parks, in that it is composed of dozens of sites spread over four states. The 38 sites are linked by the history of the Nez Perce people, rather than by geographic location. Twenty-six of the sites are on or near the Nez Perce Indian Reservation in Idaho and can be toured in one day. Adjacent states hold the other twelve sites.

Several of the sites are connected by the Nez Perce National Historic Trail, managed by the United States Forest Service. It preserves the route taken by Chief Joseph and his band when they tried to reach Canada in 1877.

The sites include:

- Battle of Bear Paw – Blaine County, Montana
- Battle of Canyon Creek - Yellowstone County, Montana
- Battle of the Clearwater – Idaho County, Idaho
- Battle of White Bird Canyon – Idaho County, Idaho
- Big Hole National Battlefield – Beaverhead County, Montana
- Camas Meadows Battle Sites – Clark County, Idaho
- Camas Prairie – Idaho County and Lewis County, Idaho
- Camp Chopunnish – Idaho County, Idaho
- Cottonwood Skirmishes – Idaho County, Idaho
- Heart of the Monster – Idaho County, Idaho
- Joseph Canyon – Wallowa County, Oregon and Asotin County, Washington
- Lolo Pass – Idaho County, Idaho and Missoula County, Montana
- Looking Glass Camp – Idaho County, Idaho
- Old Chief Joseph Gravesite – Wallowa County, Oregon
- Pierce Courthouse – Clearwater County, Idaho
- St. Joseph's Mission – Nez Perce County, Idaho
- Tolo Lake – Idaho County, Idaho
- Weippe Prairie – Weippe, Idaho

== Ecology ==
The NPNHP sites cover three main ecoregions. The first, found at the sites in the Palouse grasslands and Missouri Basin, is shortgrass prairie. These flat or slightly rolling prairies include rivers and streams, and have an altitude of about 1,000 to 3,500 feet (300 to 1,070 m). The second, found in the plateaus of the Columbia and Snake rivers, is sagebrush steppe at around 3,000 ft in altitude; it includes lava fields and flows. The third, found in the sites in the Blue Mountains, Salmon River Mountains, southwestern Montana and northern Rocky Mountains, is conifer and alpine meadows. These high-elevation sites have lower temperatures and greater precipitation than the other ecoregions.

Numerous species of mammals, amphibians, reptiles, birds and invertebrates inhabit the various park sites. Several of these species are classified in terms of their status as "threatened", "endangered" or "sensitive" at the state level. Montana Arctic grayling, mountain plover, swift fox, great grey owl, boreal owl and several fish species are all sensitive species that inhabit the park, while gray wolf and bald eagles are sometimes seen. Managers of the park have several ecological concerns including issues of invasive plant species, the degradation of animal habitat due to human activity, the protection of endangered species, and dealing with effects of climate change.

== See also ==
- Henry H. and Eliza Hart Spalding, Presbyterian missionaries to the Nez Perce
- National Parks in Idaho

== Additional Resources ==
- "Master Plan Nez Perce National Historic Park". National Park Service. 1968.
- Ted Catton (1996). "Administrative History-Nez Perce National Historic Park". National Park Service. Archived from the original on November 2, 2007.
- John Dishon McDermott (1968). "Forlorn Hope-A Study of the Battle of White Bird Canyon Idaho and the Beginning of the Nez Perce Indian War". National Park Service.
- Robert Applegate (2005). "Museum Management Plan-Nez Perce National Historical Park" (PDF). National Park Service. Archived from the original (PDF) on September 21, 2008.
