= E. William Gollings =

American painter

Elling William Gollings (17 March 1878 – 16 April 1932) was an American painter who was born in Pierce, Idaho. His works are displayed in American institutions such as the Gilcrease Museum in Oklahoma, the Buffalo Bill Historical Center in Cody, Wyoming, and the National Museum of Wildlife Art.

== Illustrations by E. William Gollings for The Foreman of the J.A.6. by E. Joy Johnson ==
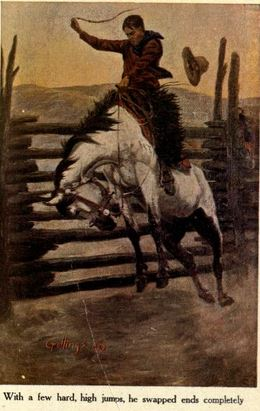

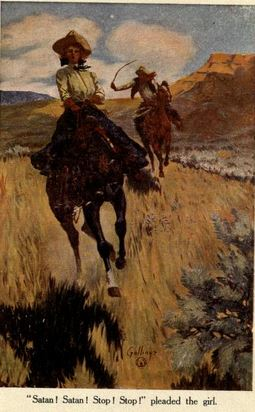

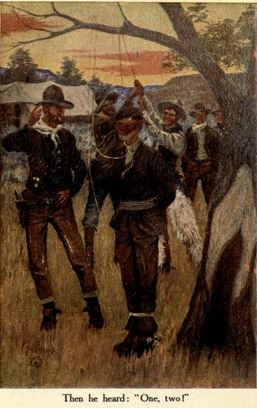

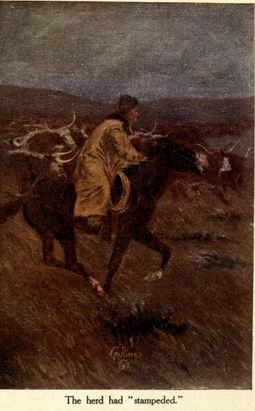

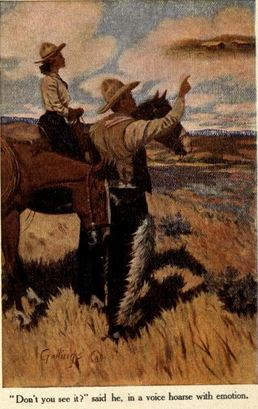

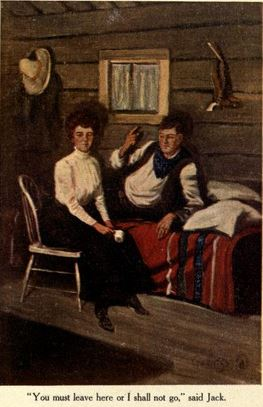
