= Dent, Idaho =

Unincorporated community in the state of Idaho, United States

Coordinates: 46°37′26″N 116°12′12″W

Dent is an unincorporated community in Clearwater County, Idaho.

== History ==
A post office called Dent was established in 1896, and remained in operation until 1954. One Mr. Dent, an early postmaster, gave the community his last name.
