= Walla Walla Council =

1855 meeting between the United States and Native Americans

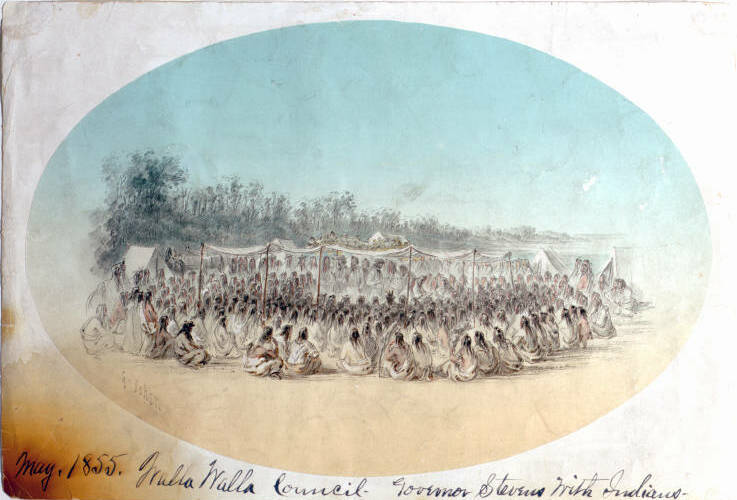
The Walla Walla Council.

The Walla Walla Council (1855) was a meeting in the Pacific Northwest between the United States and sovereign tribal nations of the Cayuse, Nez Perce, Umatilla, Walla Walla, and Yakama. The council occurred on May 29 – June 11; the treaties signed at this council on June 9 were ratified by the U.S. Senate four years later, in 1859.

These treaties codified the constitutional relationship between the people living on the Nez Perce, Umatilla, and Yakama reservations; it was one of the earliest treaties obtained in the Pacific Northwest.

Washington Territory's first governor Isaac I. Stevens secured this treaty, allowing larger portions of the land to be given to the two largest and most powerful tribes: Yakama and Nez Perce; these reservations encompassed most of their traditional hunting grounds. The smaller tribes moved to the smaller of the three reservations. Stevens was able to acquire forty-five thousand square miles (120,000 km^{2}) of land.

== 1855-9 violations ==
The three tribes were assured that they would retain total control of their territory until the treaties were ratified by Congress, which Stevens assured them would take two or three years, during which time the tribes could prepare to move their settlements onto the reservations. Simultaneously, Stevens prepared an account of the treaties and sent it to the local newspapers, which announced that the ceded lands were now open for white settlement. This was inaccurate, but illegal settlement started immediately. The Yakima defended their as-yet unceded territory, leading to the Yakima War.

In 1859, Congress ratified the treaty, but never paid the agreed sum for the ceded land.

== 1860-3 violations ==
In August 1860, Elias D. Pierce snuck onto the Nez Perce reservation disguised as an itinerant trader and found gold there. Following this, thousands of whites streamed onto the reservation, founding the illegal settlement of Lewiston, Idaho. In December 1861, Washington Territory illegally annexed large regions of the Nez Perce reservation, creating Nez Perce County, Shoshone County, Idaho County, and Missoula County. Washington Territory claimed no legal right to do this; the Nez Perce territory was simply seized in violation of the treaties.

In 1863, an autonomous band of Nez Perce signed away a large portion of the reservation in a new treaty, against the wishes of the remainder of the Nez Perce. This eventually led to the Nez Perce War.

== See also ==
- Cayuse War (1847–55)
- Yakima War (1855–58)
- Palouse War (1858)
- Nez Perce War (1877)
