= Nez =

Nez or NEZ may refer to:

== People ==
- Nez (singer) (born 1979), Turkish singer and dancer Nezihe Kalkan
- Nez, pseudonym of a member of the English alt-rock band Heavy Stereo
- Nez & Rio, an American record production team
- Grace Henderson Nez (1913–2006), Navajo weaver
- Jonathan Nez (born 1975), ninth president of the Navajo Nation
- Phefelia Nez, first lady of the Navajo Nation

== Other uses ==
- NEZ, acronym for "no escape zone", the effective range of an air-to-air missile
- Nez Cassé, a series of French railroad locomotives
- Nez Perce (disambiguation), multiple uses

== See also ==
- Pince-nez, a style of eyeglasses
