= Boomershoot =

American long-range precision rifle event

Coordinates: 46°32′36″N 116°23′28″W

Boomershoot is a long-range precision rifle event held near Orofino, Idaho each year in late spring. Participants fire long-range rifles at explosive-filled targets from 375 to 700 yd (343 to 640 m). A centerfire rifle capable of delivering accuracy of at least one minute of angle with velocity at the target of at least 1,500 ft/s (460 m/s) is required to reliably detonate the targets.

The smallest and closest targets are 4 in (100 mm) square boxes filled with potassium chlorate-based explosive paste. The longer range targets larger, 7 in (180 mm) square boxes, with more explosive. In 2019, over a ton of explosives were mixed on site and used in the three day event.

On the two days prior to the main event a precision rifle clinic is held at the same location using steel as well as exploding targets.
