= E. Joy Johnson =

American novelist

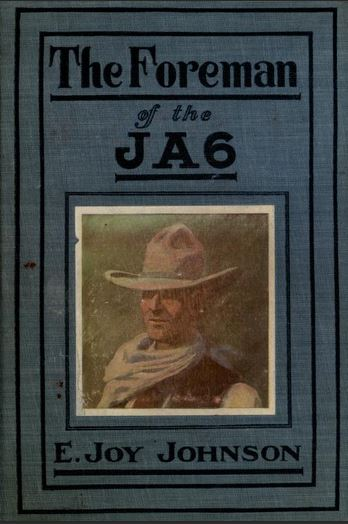
The foreman of the J.A.6, cover

Edith Hancock Johnson (February 9, 1876 – June 1, 1946), who wrote under the pen-name of E. Joy Johnson, was an American novelist of the early 20th century.

== Early life ==
Edith Hancock Johnson was born at New Tredegar, South Wales, on February 9, 1876, to the reverend Joseph J. Hancock and Elizabeth Hamlin. The family moved to New York State when Johnson was six years old.

Johnson trained as a singer in New York City, but performed only privately for family and friends. She was a graduate of Blackford School of Character Analysis.

== Career ==
Before marrying, Edith Hancock was an assistant at the Lusk post office and a typesetter at the Lusk Herald office, a newspaper belonging to J.E. Mayes, her brother-in-law. She was also among the first women in Wyoming to own a drug store, but she gave it up when she married.

E. Joy Johnson wrote Western poetry and prose. She was the author of The Foreman of the J.A.6. (1911), dedicated to the people of the West, with a preface by former governor Bryant Butler Brooks. The illustrations were by the artist E. William Gollings. Together with her husband, she owned the J.A.6. ranch and the novel was an account of their experience running a ranch in Eastern Wyoming in the 19th century. After the J.A.6. the Johnsons bought the Cross A ranch.

In 1987, Johnson's daughter, Ihla, published The Cowboy's Alphabet with texts by her mother and illustrations again by Gollings.

== Personal life ==
Edith Hancock was a resident of Wyoming since 1888 when her father, a missionary of the Congregational Church, moved the family there. She lived in Lusk, Wyoming. Rev. Hancock claimed the land that is currently the Mayes Addition, south of Lusk. She married Lawrence Johnson (1873–1957) on July 3, 1894. The couple had three children: Harleigh L. (1896–1953), Ihla G. (1902–1999, married Anderson) and Avaley Lorain (1912–1981, married Outhouse).

When Theodore Roosevelt visited Cheyenne, Wyoming during his presidency, Hancock, an expert horsewoman, rode at the front of the parade.

Johnson died on June 1, 1946, at Lusk, Wyoming, and is buried at Lusk Cemetery.

== Gallery ==
Illustrations by E. William Gollings for The Foreman of the J.A.6.

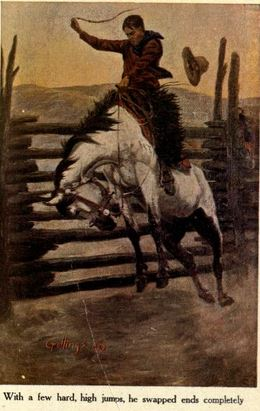

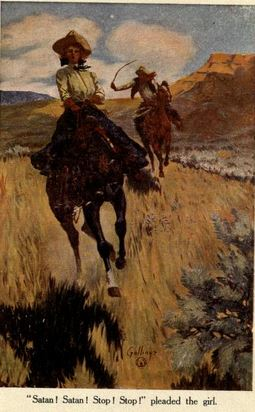

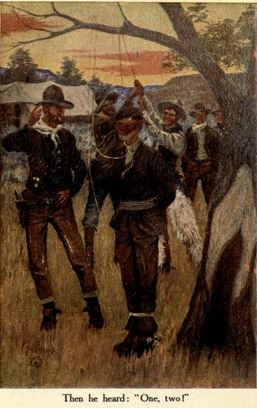

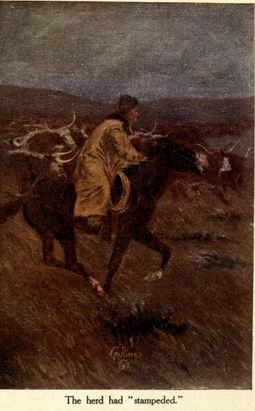

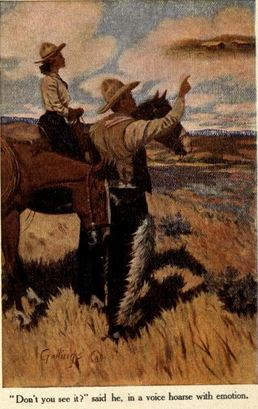

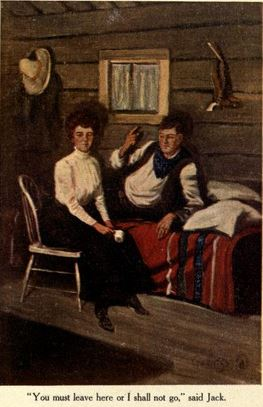
