= Headquarters, Idaho =

Unincorporated community in the state of Idaho, United States

- Unincorporated community
- Location within Idaho Location within the United States
- Coordinates: 46°37′48″N 115°48′34″W
- Country: United States
- State: Idaho
- County: Clearwater
- Elevation: 3,160 ft (960 m)
- Time zone: UTC-8 (Pacific (PST))
  - Summer (DST): UTC-7 (PDT)
- Area codes: 208, 986
- GNIS feature ID: 396638

Headquarters is an unincorporated community in Clearwater County, Idaho, United States. Headquarters is located on State Highway 11, 10 miles (16 km) north of Pierce.

== History ==
A company town of Potlatch Corp., it was originally established as a fire protection station in 1906. Headquarters was the northeastern terminus of the Camas Prairie Railroad.

Headquarters' population was estimated at 300 in 1960.

The closure of lumber mills in the area in the 1980s and 1990s eliminated many jobs and severely impacted its population.

== Climate ==
According to the Köppen climate classification system, Grangeville qualifies as having a dry-summer humid continental climate (Köppen Dsb).

Climate data for Headquarters, Idaho 1991–2020 normals, 1959-2020 extremes: 3200ft (975m)
Month	Jan	Feb	Mar	Apr	May	Jun	Jul	Aug	Sep	Oct	Nov	Dec	Year
Record high °F (°C)	55 (13)	64 (18)	72 (22)	88 (31)	97 (36)	97 (36)	102 (39)	108 (42)	99 (37)	85 (29)	69 (21)	55 (13)	108 (42)
Mean maximum °F (°C)	46.2 (7.9)	53.0 (11.7)	62.1 (16.7)	74.5 (23.6)	82.5 (28.1)	89.0 (31.7)	93.0 (33.9)	93.8 (34.3)	88.3 (31.3)	75.2 (24.0)	55.9 (13.3)	44.3 (6.8)	93.8 (34.3)
Mean daily maximum °F (°C)	35.0 (1.7)	39.4 (4.1)	45.5 (7.5)	52.4 (11.3)	63.2 (17.3)	69.7 (20.9)	80.1 (26.7)	79.6 (26.4)	70.3 (21.3)	55.5 (13.1)	41.6 (5.3)	33.2 (0.7)	55.5 (13.0)
Daily mean °F (°C)	26.7 (−2.9)	29.9 (−1.2)	34.3 (1.3)	39.5 (4.2)	48.6 (9.2)	55.0 (12.8)	62.0 (16.7)	60.6 (15.9)	52.6 (11.4)	41.8 (5.4)	33.2 (0.7)	26.4 (−3.1)	42.6 (5.9)
Mean daily minimum °F (°C)	18.5 (−7.5)	20.3 (−6.5)	23.1 (−4.9)	26.5 (−3.1)	33.9 (1.1)	40.3 (4.6)	44.0 (6.7)	41.5 (5.3)	35.0 (1.7)	28.1 (−2.2)	24.7 (−4.1)	19.6 (−6.9)	29.6 (−1.3)
Mean minimum °F (°C)	−1.9 (−18.8)	3.3 (−15.9)	12.1 (−11.1)	21.1 (−6.1)	25.0 (−3.9)	31.8 (−0.1)	36.4 (2.4)	35.2 (1.8)	26.5 (−3.1)	18.6 (−7.4)	10.6 (−11.9)	−0.1 (−17.8)	−9.1 (−22.8)
Record low °F (°C)	−27 (−33)	−21 (−29)	−11 (−24)	4 (−16)	19 (−7)	25 (−4)	26 (−3)	28 (−2)	18 (−8)	1 (−17)	−22 (−30)	−28 (−33)	−28 (−33)
Average precipitation inches (mm)	4.75 (121)	4.17 (106)	4.57 (116)	3.66 (93)	3.49 (89)	2.66 (68)	0.90 (23)	1.03 (26)	1.43 (36)	3.42 (87)	5.23 (133)	5.58 (142)	40.89 (1,040)
Average snowfall inches (cm)	32.80 (83.3)	16.60 (42.2)	16.50 (41.9)	4.20 (10.7)	0.80 (2.0)	0.00 (0.00)	0.00 (0.00)	0.00 (0.00)	0.00 (0.00)	0.20 (0.51)	16.00 (40.6)	31.60 (80.3)	118.7 (301.51)
Source 1: NOAA
Source 2: XMACIS2 (temp records & 1981-2010 monthly max/mins)

Climate data for Headquarters (1959-2010)
Month	Jan	Feb	Mar	Apr	May	Jun	Jul	Aug	Sep	Oct	Nov	Dec	Year
Record high °F (°C)	55 (13)	64 (18)	72 (22)	88 (31)	97 (36)	97 (36)	102 (39)	108 (42)	99 (37)	85 (29)	69 (21)	55 (13)	108 (42)
Mean daily maximum °F (°C)	35 (2)	39.9 (4.4)	45.2 (7.3)	53.1 (11.7)	62.8 (17.1)	70.9 (21.6)	80.8 (27.1)	80.6 (27.0)	70.4 (21.3)	57 (14)	42.6 (5.9)	34.3 (1.3)	56.1 (13.4)
Mean daily minimum °F (°C)	18.8 (−7.3)	19.6 (−6.9)	23.3 (−4.8)	28.7 (−1.8)	34.9 (1.6)	42 (6)	45.1 (7.3)	43.4 (6.3)	36.5 (2.5)	29.9 (−1.2)	25.2 (−3.8)	19.3 (−7.1)	30.6 (−0.8)
Record low °F (°C)	−27 (−33)	−24 (−31)	−11 (−24)	4 (−16)	19 (−7)	25 (−4)	26 (−3)	28 (−2)	18 (−8)	1 (−17)	−5 (−21)	−28 (−33)	−28 (−33)
Average precipitation inches (mm)	5.41 (137)	3.79 (96)	3.94 (100)	3.26 (83)	3.26 (83)	2.53 (64)	1.06 (27)	1.24 (31)	1.69 (43)	3 (76)	5.15 (131)	5.4 (140)	39.74 (1,009)
Average snowfall inches (cm)	29.9 (76)	15.9 (40)	13 (33)	4 (10)	0.4 (1.0)	0 (0)	0 (0)	0 (0)	0 (0)	0.6 (1.5)	14.1 (36)	28.6 (73)	106.5 (271)
Average precipitation days	17	14	15	14	13	11	5	5	7	10	16	17	144
Source: WRCC
