= Old Chief Joseph Gravesite =

- Wallowa Lake Site
- U.S. National Register of Historic Places
- U.S. National Historic Landmark
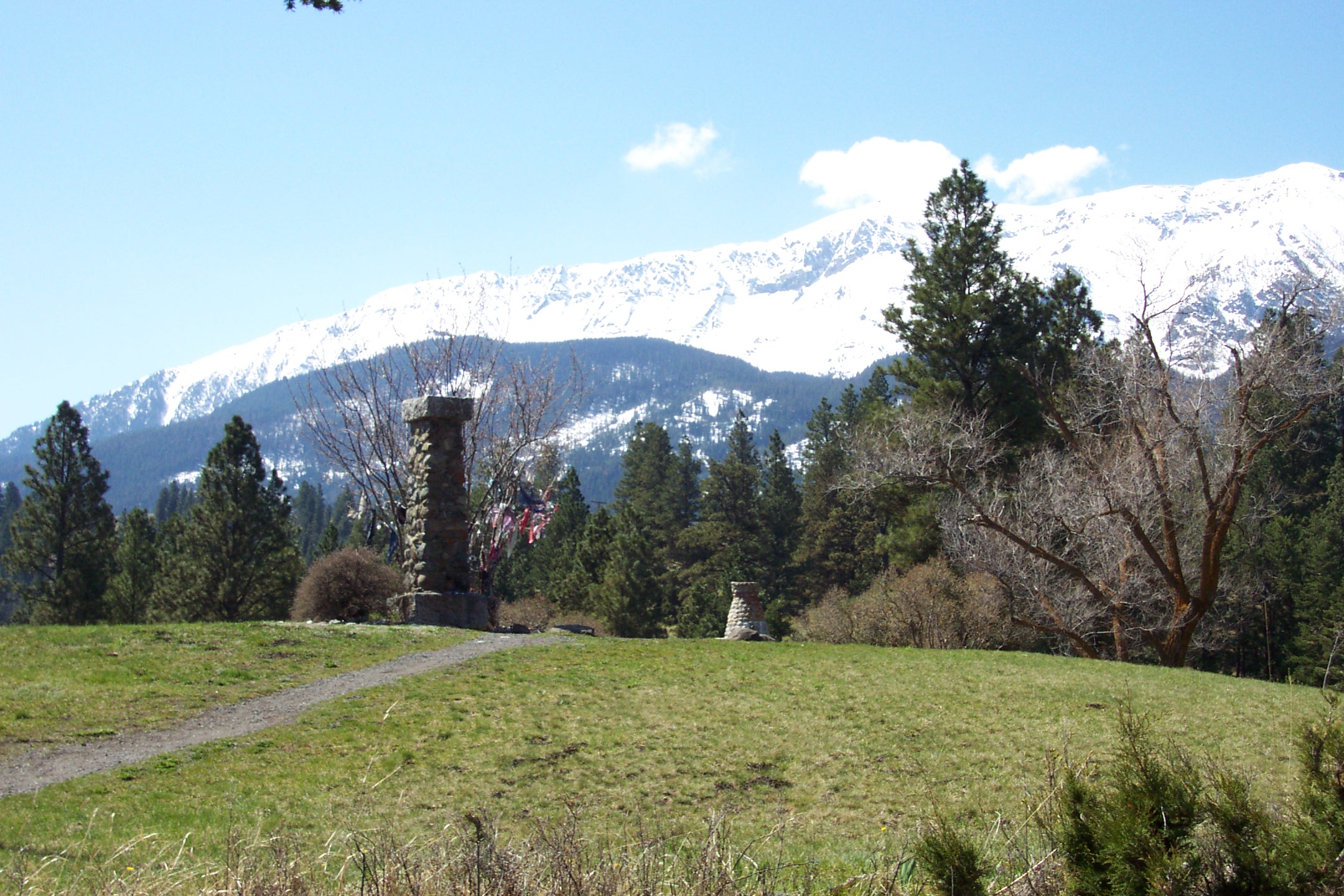
- Gravesite of Old Joseph

- Location within Oregon Location within the United States
- Location: Wallowa County, Oregon, USA
- Nearest city: Joseph, Oregon
- Coordinates: 45°20′11″N 117°13′20″W
- Area: 5 acres (2.0 ha)
- Built: 1877
- NRHP reference No.: 89001082

Significant dates
- Added to NRHP: October 15, 1966
- Designated NHL: May 5, 1985

The Old Chief Joseph Gravesite, also known as Nez Perce Traditional Site, Wallowa Lake, Chief Joseph Cemetery and Joseph National Indian Cemetery is a Native American cemetery near Joseph, Oregon. The area was also a traditional campsite of the Nez Perce and may be archaeologically significant. It was declared a National Historic Landmark in 1985, listed as Wallowa Lake Site. It is a component of the Nez Perce National Historical Park.

== Setting ==
The Old Chief Joseph Gravesite is located at the northern end of Wallowa Lake, on a 5-acre (2.0 ha) site with commanding views of the lake and surrounding mountains. It is just south of Oregon Highway 351, from which an unpaved drive enters the property through a gateway in a stone wall. The main feature is a circular earthen platform, lined with a low stone retaining wall. At its center is the memorial marker to Old Chief Joseph, a mortared stone pillar, with a bronze relief of the chief's head on one side. Other features of the property include a flagpole, and the grave of an early white settler of the area.

== History ==
Old Chief Joseph was the mid-19th century leader of the Wallowa band of the Nez Perce tribe, one of several that had refused to sign treaties in the 1850s and 1860s that would have forced them onto reservation land in Idaho. The Wallowa Lake area was part of the homeland of this band, and both Old Chief Joseph and his successor Chief Joseph, were steadfast in their refusal to abandon the land. When Old Joseph died in 1871, he had a traditional burial at the forks of the Lostine and Wallowa rivers. The Wallowa band were infamously forced off the land in the Nez Perce War in 1877.

In 1886, Old Chief Joseph's grave was desecrated by local property owners and his skull was removed as a souvenir. In 1926, his grave was moved, with permission from the Nez Perce, to this location, and the stone marker was placed. In the 1930s, the Works Progress Administration funded work performed by members of the Nez Perce tribe to make a number of improvements, including the stone wall at the highway, and the retaining wall. The cemetery is a sacred place for the Nez Perce people, and is held in trust for them by the United States government.

== See also ==
- Iwetemlaykin State Heritage Site
- List of National Historic Landmarks in Oregon
- National Register of Historic Places listings in Wallowa County, Oregon
- Nez Perce National Historic Trail
- Nez Perce National Historical Park
