= Heart of the Monster =

Coordinates: 46.2133°N 116.0059°W

Heart of the Monster (in the Nez Perce language timʼnépe) is a geological monument near Kamiah, Idaho that is central to an origin story told by the Nez Perce people.

The mound marks the spot where Coyote discarded the heart of a monster he killed after he found it eating all the animals. Coyote distributed the other remains of the monster in all directions, and from those remains sprang the Nez Perce peoples.

The site is one of three Nez Perce legend sites maintained by the National Park Service.

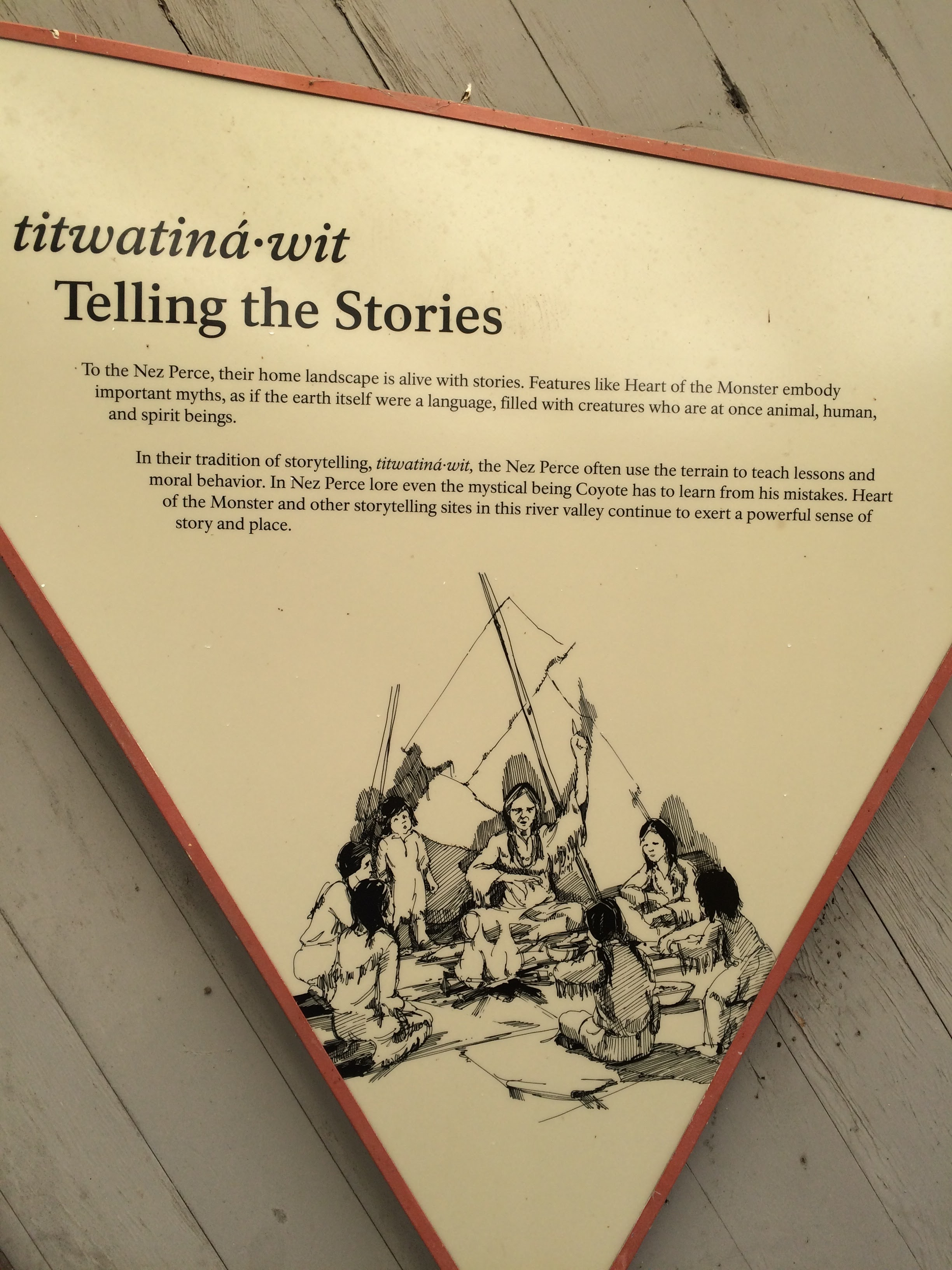
Historical Marker

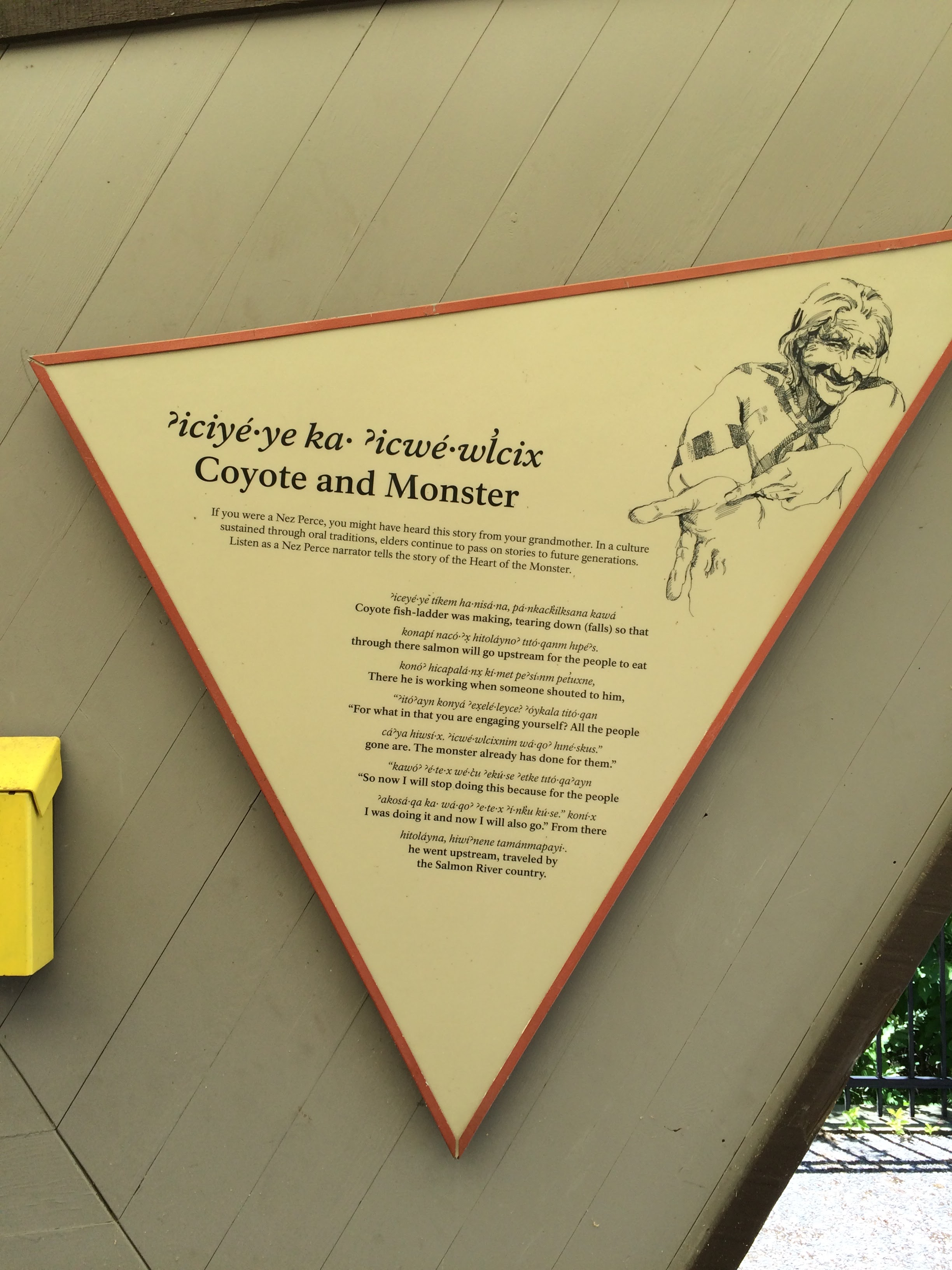
Historical Marker

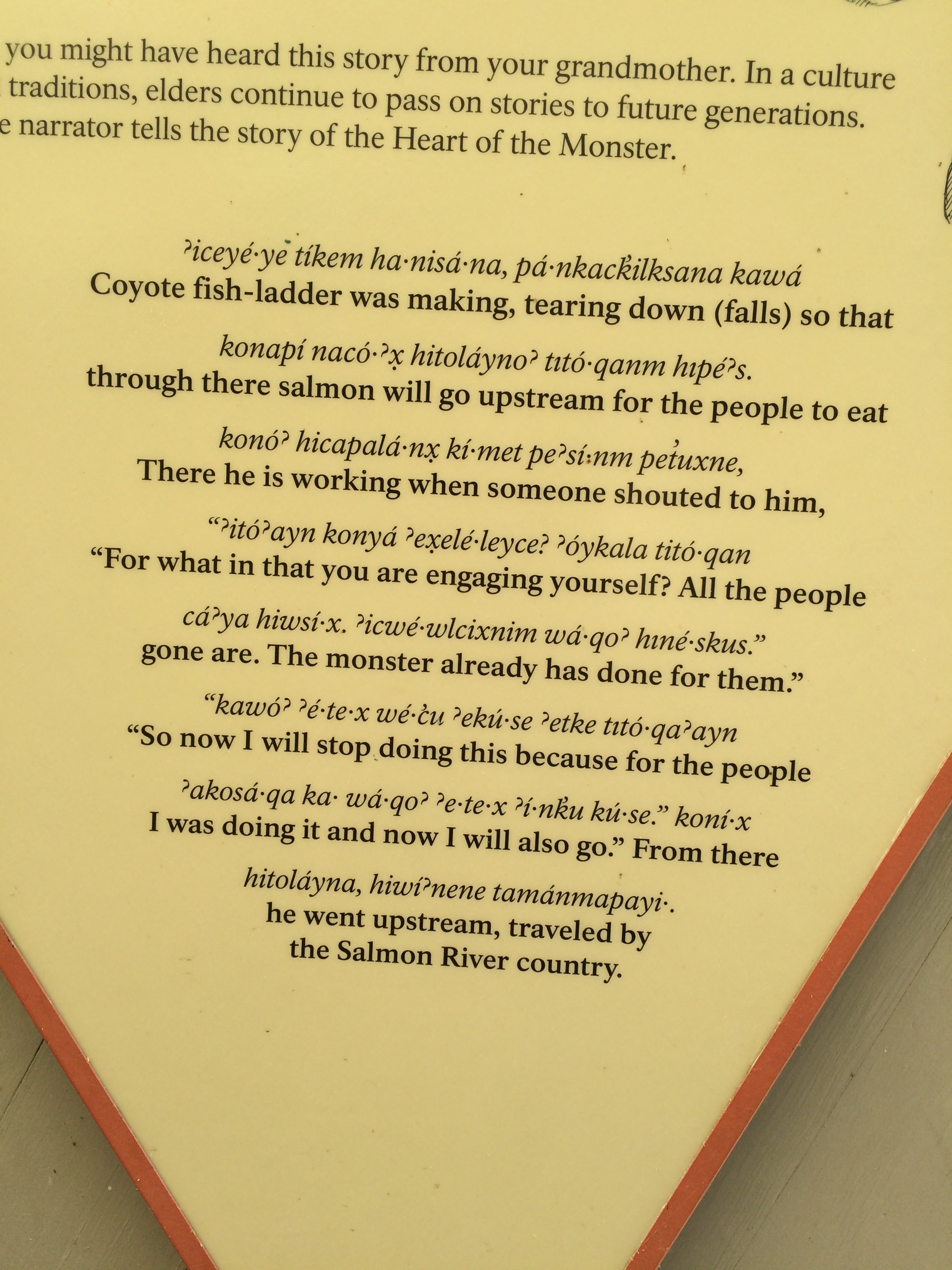
Historical Marker

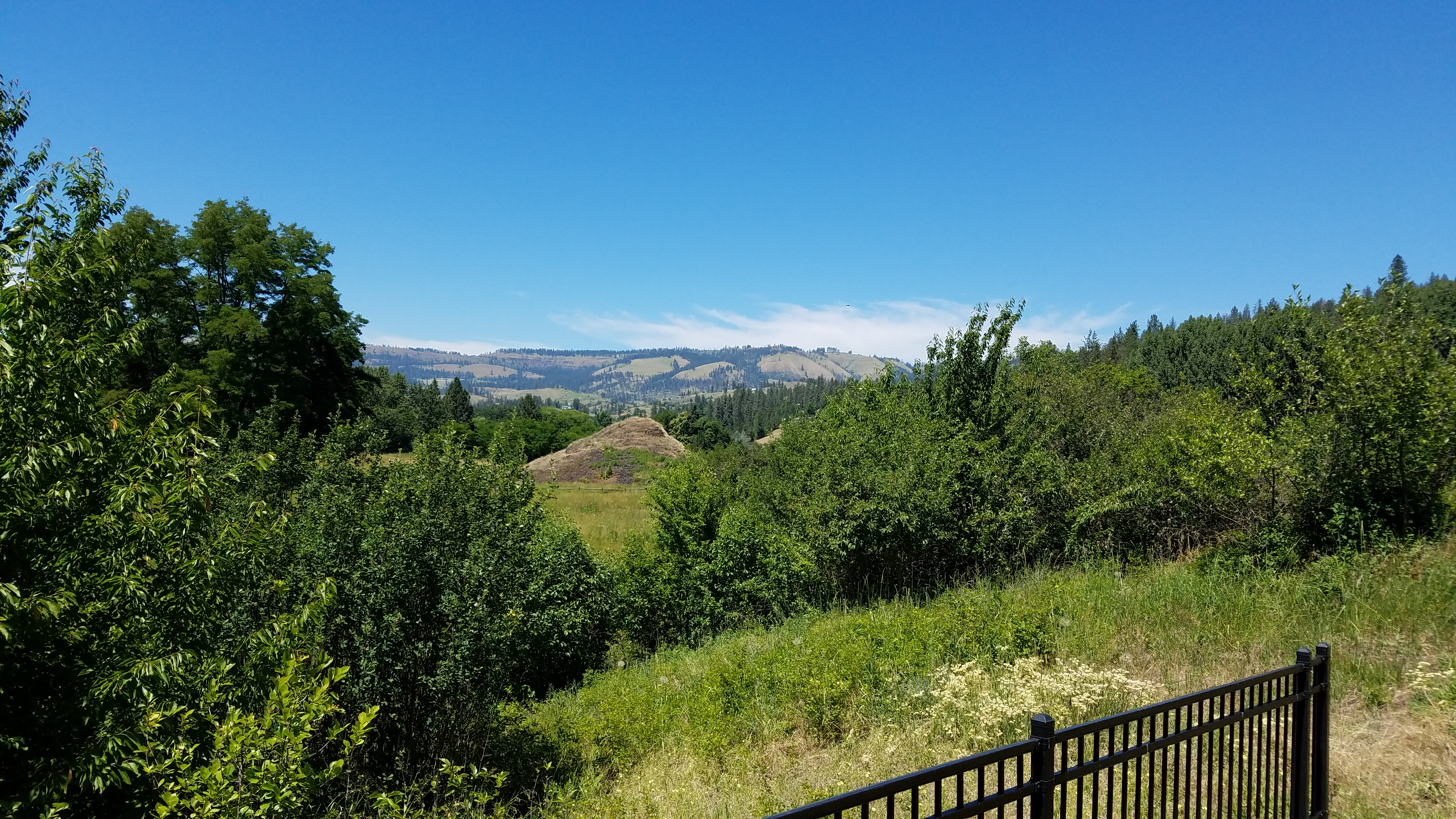
Heart of the Monster 2017

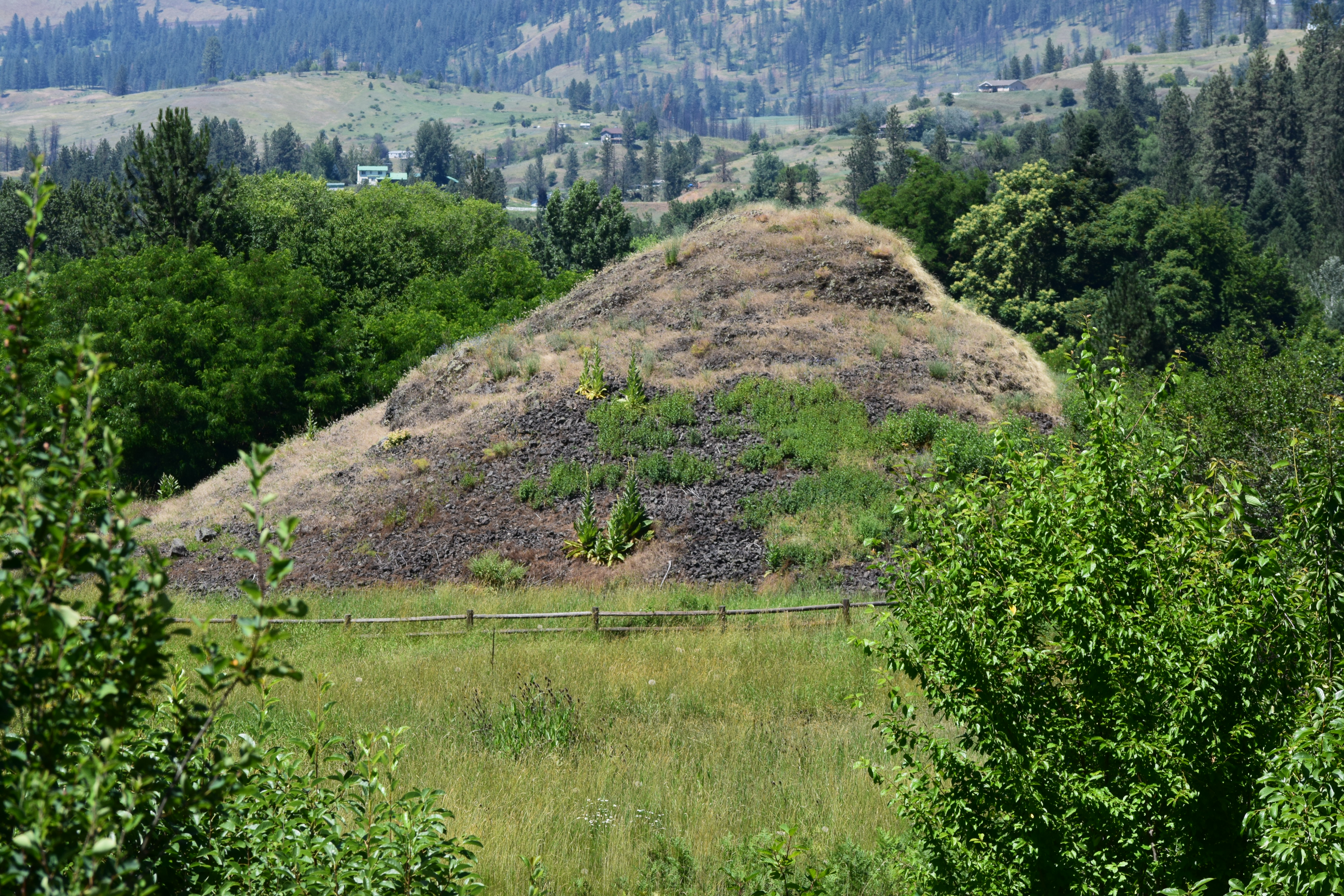
Heart of the Monster 2017

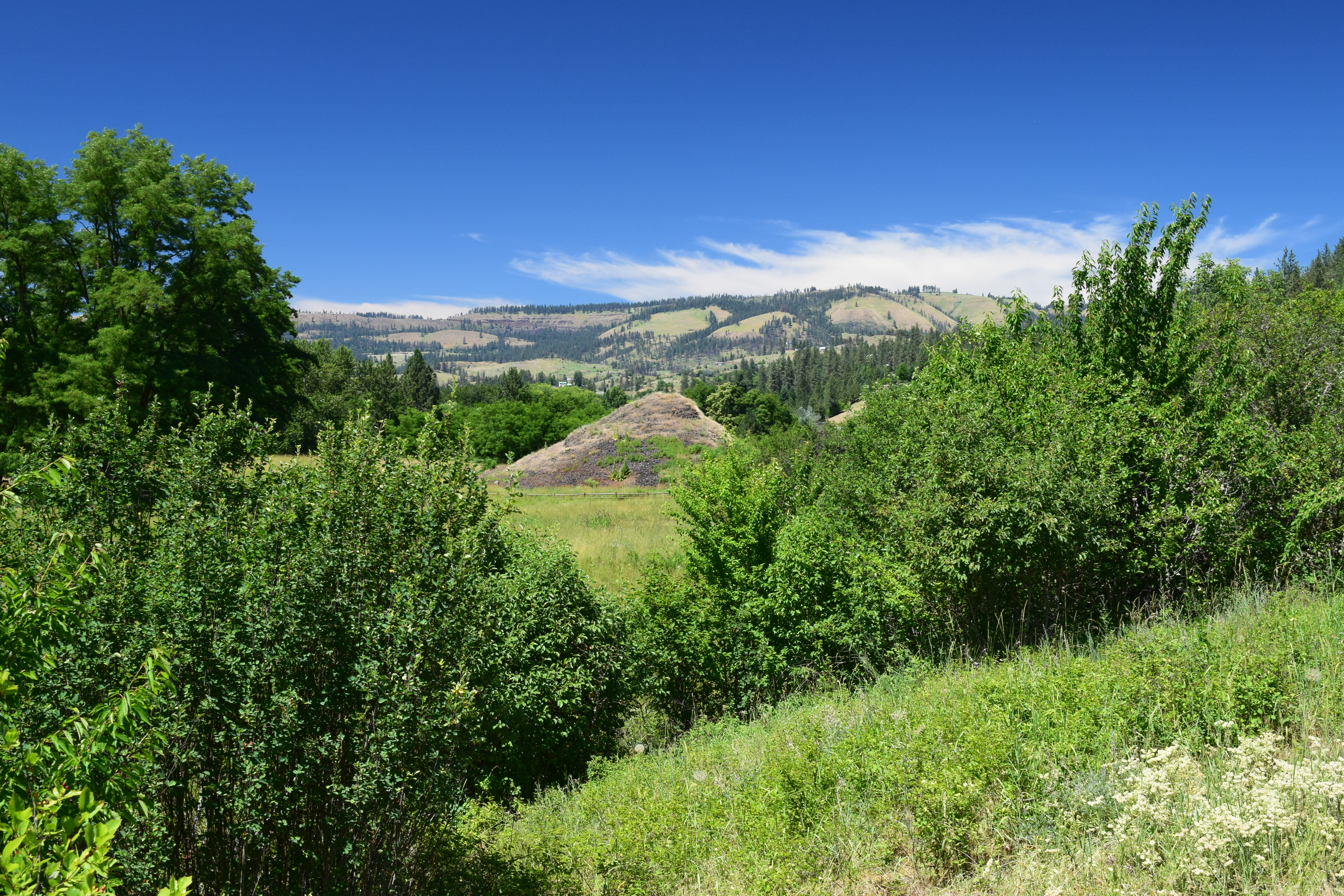
Heart of the Monster 2017

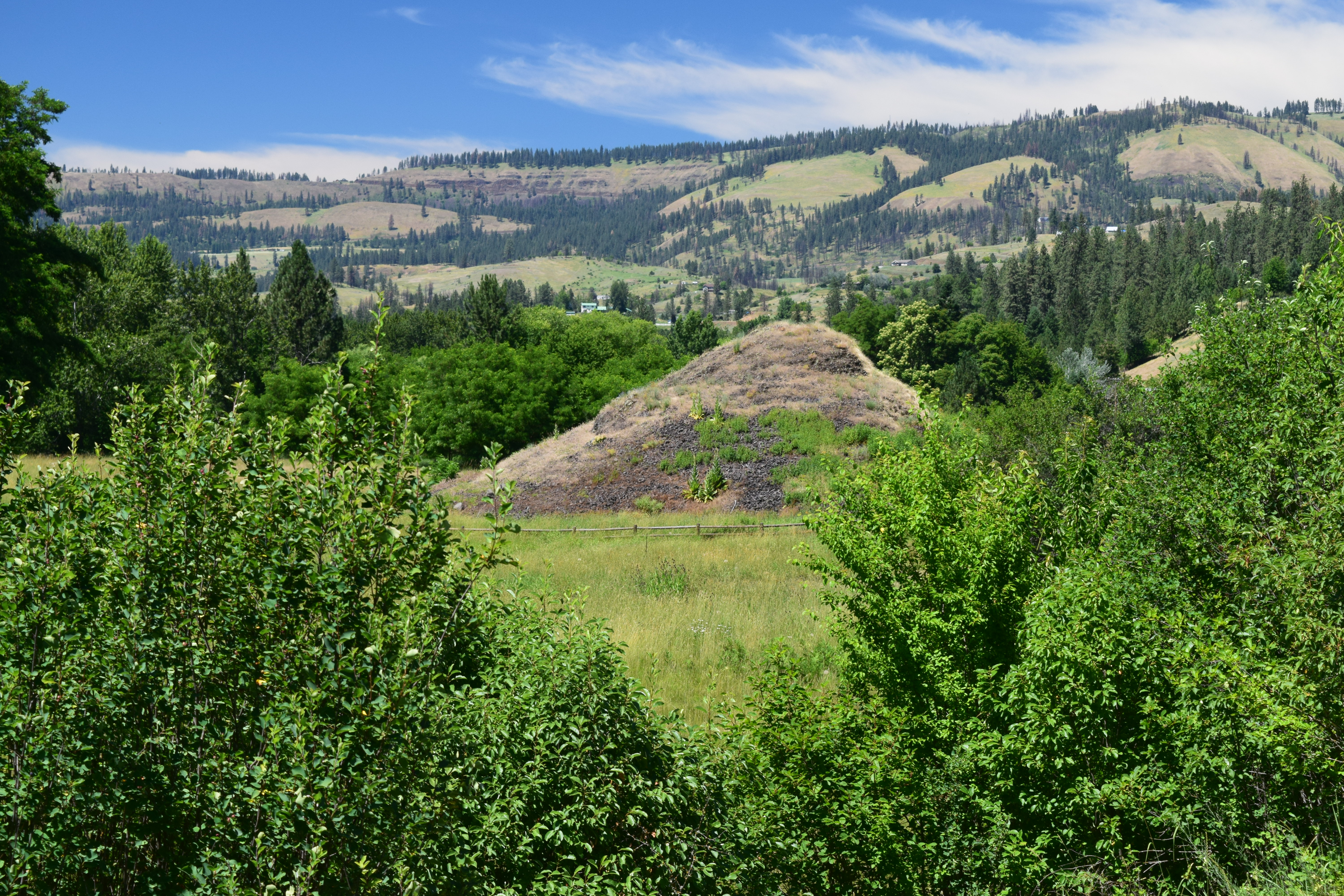
Heart of the Monster 2017

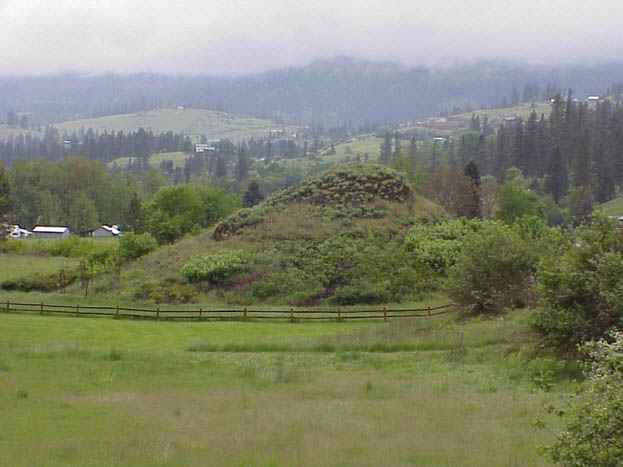
"The Heart of the Monster", described in the Nez Perce origin story
