= Pierce Courthouse =

- U.S. National Register of Historic Places
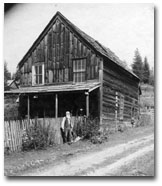
- Pierce Courthouse, 1920
- Location: Pierce, Idaho
- Coordinates: 46°29′25″N 115°47′53″W
- Built: 1862
- NRHP reference No.: 72000100
- Added to NRHP: November 3, 1972

Pierce Courthouse, also known as Pierce Historic Site, is a historic wooden building located in Pierce, Idaho. It was built in 1862 and listed on the National Register of Historic Places in 1972.

The courthouse, and the town of Pierce itself, is named after Elias D. Pierce, a local metal prospector active in the mid-19th century. Later the town of Pierce became the Shoshone County (Washington Territory) seat. The Pierce Courthouse housed governmental functions until 1885.

The site is operated by the Idaho State Historical Society.
