= Elias D. Pierce =

American politician

Elias Davidson Pierce (1824—1897) was one of the key figures in the Idaho Gold Rush in 1860 (which occurred in what was then Washington Territory).

While it is said that Elias D. Pierce was born in Northern Ireland, no official U.S. government document supports this claim. All details, as stated in his memoir and by federal authorities, point towards his birth in Harrison County, Virginia (now in West Virginia) in 1824. In 1844 he purchased land in Indiana and relocated to Hartford City, where he studied law, becoming an attorney before enlisting as a volunteer during the Mexican War. After serving 8 months in Mexico, primarily on guard duty, he returned to Indiana, near death from dysentery, and was discharged in July 1848. In 1849, he went to California as part of the gold rush. Pierce worked as a trader until he served in the California House of Representatives in 1852.

== Discovering Gold in Idaho ==
Elias D. Pierce then became dedicated to finding and retrieving gold in the Nez Perce Indian region in Northern-Central Idaho, leading to the establishment of Pierce, Idaho. Pierce had joined a former Hudson Bay Company trapper in a trading expedition which led him to settle in the region. Pierce spent the winter at Lewis and Clark's Canoe Campsite on the Clearwater River with Nez Perce Indian, Wislanaeqa. In 1859 when panning for gold with Wislanaeqa in Clearwater, Pierce discovered flakes of gold. Now with proof of its existence in Idaho, Pierce was determined to excavate for gold in the region despite legal implications from the Nez Perce Indians, which banned them from mining in the area. Additionally, many settlers rejected Pierce's idea to retrieve the gold in the region because they believed that it would provoke an all out war with the Indian residents. However, from his mining base called Walla Walla on August 12th, 1860, Pierce and 11 others snuck across the reservation to collect the gold, camping on Canal Gulch near where the town of Pierce would later be established. Moving slowly, as not to be caught by the Nez Perce Indians, the men took six weeks to make a one-week trip to the site of gold. On December 3, 1860, a second party came into the region to continue the extraction of gold, which Pierce had started, and to found the town of Pierce, Idaho. By early the next year, Pierce's discovery had attracted several thousand unemployed gold hunters to the region and by June 8th, 1861 the county seat approved the city of Pierce as a permanent community. As for Pierce who was more interested in discovery than mining itself, he left Idaho in an attempt to find gold elsewhere but was mostly unsuccessful.

== Bibliography ==
- Leonard J. Arrington. History of Idaho, Vol. 1. (Moscow, Idaho: University of Idaho Press, 1994) p. 183.
