= Weippe Prairie =

Historic site in the U.S. state of Idaho

Coordinates: 46°22′N 115°56′W

- U.S. National Register of Historic Places
- U.S. National Historic Landmark
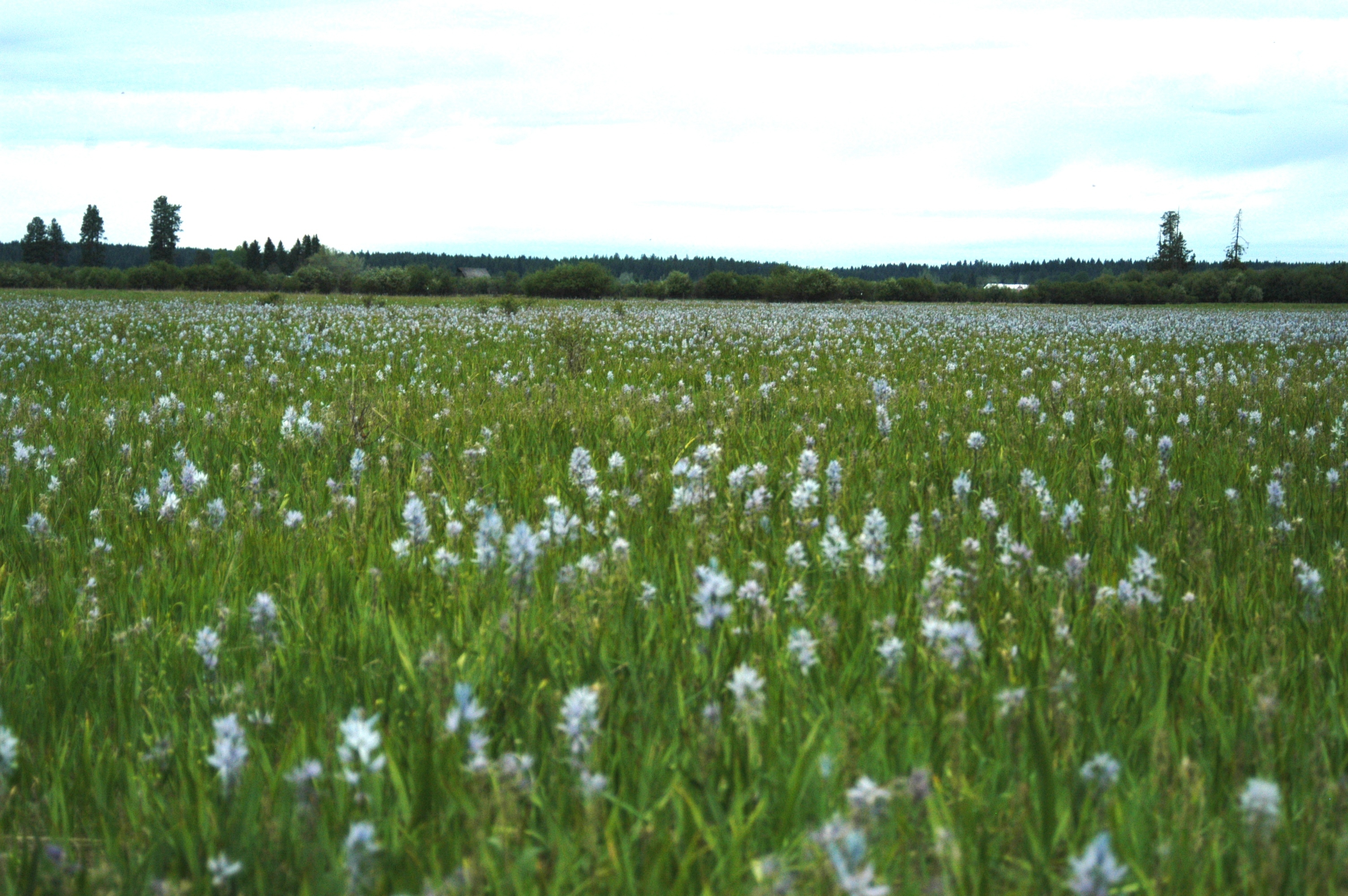
- Camas flower field, Weippe Prairie, Idaho

- Location within Idaho Location within the United States
- Nearest city: Weippe, Idaho
- Built: 1805
- NRHP reference No.: 66000311

Significant dates
- Added to NRHP: October 15, 1966
- Designated NHL: May 23, 1966

Weippe Prairie is a large clearing, a "beautiful upland prairie field of about two by three miles bordered by farmland made from cleared pine forests", just north of the Middle Fork Clearwater River at 3,000 feet elevation near the town of Weippe in Clearwater County, Idaho. Camas flowers grow well there and historically attracted native gatherers of the camas roots. This location is where the Lewis and Clark Expedition emerged from crossing the Bitterroot Mountains on the Lolo Trail and first met the Nez Perce tribe of Native Americans, in September 1805. The site was declared a National Historic Landmark in 1966 and is now part of Nez Perce National Historical Park.

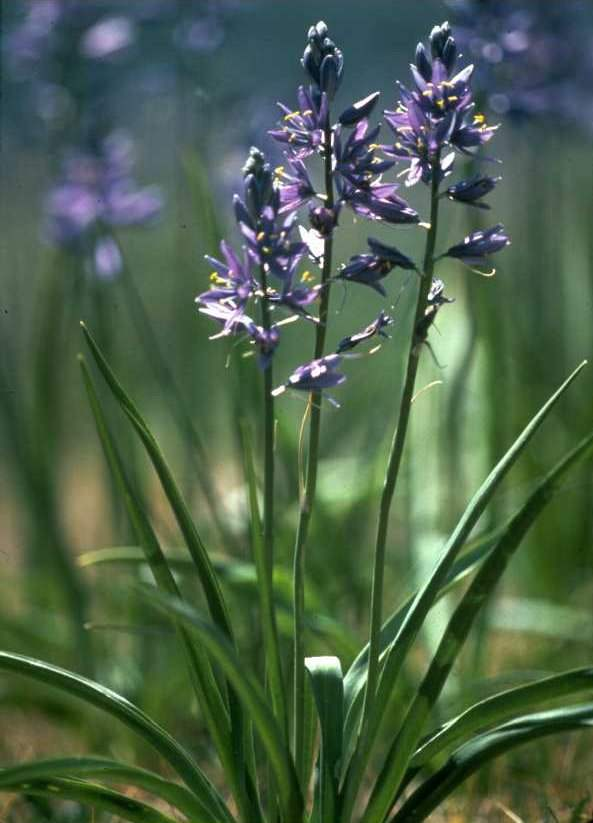
Indian Camas (Camassia quamash)

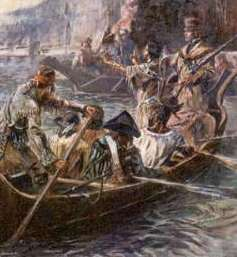
Lewis and Sacajawea on the Columbia River later in 1805, wearing buckskins

On September 20, 1805, the first members of Lewis and Clark's Corps of Discovery, including Clark himself, emerged starving and weak onto the Weippe Prairie. There they encountered a large Nez Perce encampment, who were attracted to the area by the abundant hunting as well as the fields of camas flowers (Camassia spp.), whose roots were a staple of their diet. The Nez Perce "had never before seen white men", and "proved to be the most helpful of the tribes which the explorers encountered in their travels".

By September 22, 1805, Lewis and the rest of the expedition arrived at Weippe Prairie. Lewis and Clark met many of the Nez Perce chiefs, including Twisted Hair, the leader of the encampment. Another chief, Red Bear, gave them dressed buckskins. Lewis and Clark reciprocated with presents of "beads and a few other articles", though the Nez Perce "later found the white man's gifts to be cheap."

The Nez Perce purportedly were predisposed to be friendly to the white explorers due to the positive stories told by a young woman of their tribe who had been kidnapped and sold into slavery by other tribes, eventually sold to and lived with white traders, and later returned to the Nez Perce. According to oral tradition, this woman, named Watkuweis (meaning "returned from a faraway country"), when hearing of the arrival of Lewis and Clark, pleaded that they not be harmed. Her tales of the kindness she had experienced from white people reportedly convinced the Nez Perce to offer friendship to the explorers. The Nez Perce provided camas root cakes and other food, helped the expedition build canoes for their continued westward journey, and mapped out the water route the expedition would follow to the Pacific Ocean. The expedition cached some materials nearby and found the caches untouched when they returned in the spring of 1806. They also left the expedition's horses. The Nez Perce were divided about returning the horses when the expedition returned, but the Corps eventually regained most of them. Upon their return in 1806, the Lewis and Clark expedition spent an extended time with the Nez Perce, from May to late June, due to the late spring in the Bitterroot Mountains.

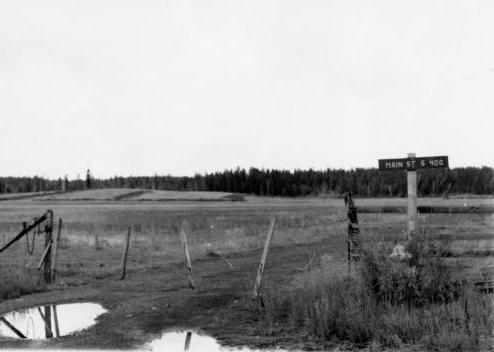
View southwest from Weippe, Idaho, toward the site of the westernmost Nez Perce 1805 village

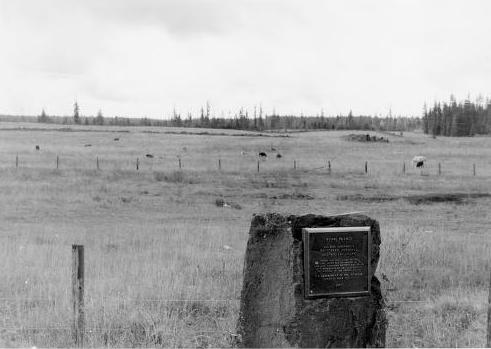
National Historic Landmark plaque overlooking the site of the western Nez Perce 1805 village

The part of Weippe Prairie most associated with the Lewis and Clark expedition, covered with camas and close to the town of Weippe, Idaho, was declared a National Historic Landmark in 1966. It is one of 38 separate sites scattered throughout Washington, Oregon, Idaho, and Montana which were later combined into the Nez Perce National Historical Park, which interprets the site. The name Weippe (pronounced 'WEE-ipe') is derived from a Nez Perce name whose meaning has been variously reported as a "very old place" or as referring to a spring of water or the camas grounds. A literal translation has not been found.

Weippe Prairie is also associated with the Nez Perce War of 1877, in which the U.S. Army attempted to force a band of Nez Perce under Chief Joseph to move onto reservation lands. The nontreaty bands held a council on Weippe Prairie following the nearby Battle of the Clearwater.

== See also ==
- List of National Historic Landmarks in Idaho
- National Register of Historic Places listings in Clearwater County, Idaho
