= Pierce, Idaho =

- City
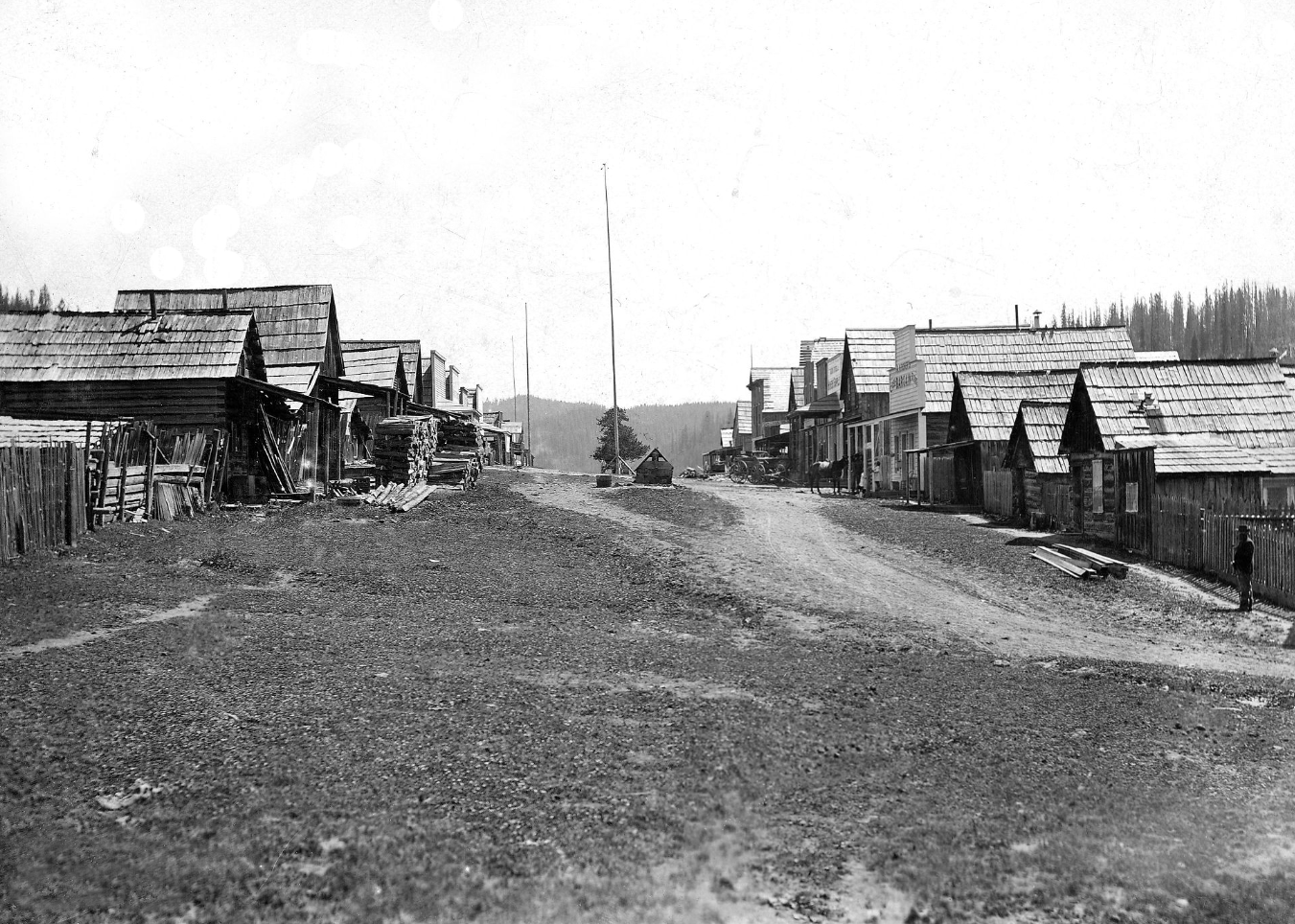
- Pierce, 1860

- Location of Pierce in Clearwater County, Idaho.
- Coordinates: 46°29′45″N 115°48′04″W
- Country: United States
- State: Idaho
- County: Clearwater

Area
  - Total: 0.83 sq mi (2.14 km^{2})
  - Land: 0.83 sq mi (2.14 km^{2})
  - Water: 0 sq mi (0.00 km^{2})
- Elevation: 3,068 ft (935 m)

Population (2020)
  - Total: 467
  - Density: 565/sq mi (218/km^{2})
- Time zone: UTC-8 (Pacific (PST))
  - Summer (DST): UTC-7 (PDT)
- ZIP code: 83546
- Area code: 208
- FIPS code: 16-62740
- GNIS feature ID: 2411420
- Website: www.cityofpierce.net

Pierce is a city in the northwest United States, located in Clearwater County, Idaho. The population was 467 at the 2020 census, down from 508 in 2010.

== History ==
The first discovery of gold in Idaho (then Washington Territory) was made by Elias D. Pierce and Wilbur F. Bassett on Orofino Creek (Canal Gulch) in October 1860, a mile (1.6 km) north of Pierce. On land ceded to the Nez Perce people at the Walla Walla Council in 1855 (with a 1859 treaty), the gold discovery led to significant reduction of that agreement in 1863, and the Nez Perce War in 1877.

Pierce was the first county seat for Shoshone County, which was established in January 1861 in Washington Territory and for most of its first year included most of present-day Idaho and Wyoming. The Pierce Courthouse, constructed in 1862, is Idaho's oldest public building. Idaho Territory was established in 1863, and the county seat moved north to the Silver Valley in Murray in 1884 (and to Wallace in 1898). Present-day Clearwater County, formed in 1911, was part of Shoshone County until 1904, when it was annexed by Nez Perce County.

== Lynching ==
Lee Kee Nam and 4 other unidentified Chinese men were lynched in Pierce City in September of 1885. They were accused of murder and subsequently lynched attempting to leave north out of Clearwater County.

== Geography ==
Pierce is located about 9 miles northeast of the Weippe Prairie, north of the Clearwater River canyon.

According to the United States Census Bureau, the city has a total area of 0.82 square miles (2.12 km^{2}), all of it land.

=== Climate ===
Pierce has a humid continental climate (Dfb) according to the Köppen climate classification system.

Climate data for Pierce, Idaho, 1991–2020 normals, extremes 1922–present
Month	Jan	Feb	Mar	Apr	May	Jun	Jul	Aug	Sep	Oct	Nov	Dec	Year
Record high °F (°C)	59 (15)	61 (16)	77 (25)	93 (34)	97 (36)	102 (39)	107 (42)	108 (42)	103 (39)	88 (31)	69 (21)	59 (15)	108 (42)
Mean maximum °F (°C)	43.8 (6.6)	50.6 (10.3)	62.6 (17.0)	74.4 (23.6)	83.6 (28.7)	89.5 (31.9)	95.4 (35.2)	96.1 (35.6)	89.6 (32.0)	77.8 (25.4)	56.5 (13.6)	41.9 (5.5)	97.5 (36.4)
Mean daily maximum °F (°C)	35.0 (1.7)	39.4 (4.1)	46.8 (8.2)	54.4 (12.4)	64.3 (17.9)	71.2 (21.8)	82.5 (28.1)	82.5 (28.1)	72.7 (22.6)	57.6 (14.2)	42.1 (5.6)	33.5 (0.8)	56.8 (13.8)
Daily mean °F (°C)	26.7 (−2.9)	29.5 (−1.4)	35.2 (1.8)	41.8 (5.4)	50.1 (10.1)	56.5 (13.6)	63.9 (17.7)	62.7 (17.1)	54.4 (12.4)	43.6 (6.4)	33.2 (0.7)	26.0 (−3.3)	43.6 (6.5)
Mean daily minimum °F (°C)	18.5 (−7.5)	19.7 (−6.8)	23.6 (−4.7)	29.2 (−1.6)	35.9 (2.2)	41.7 (5.4)	45.3 (7.4)	42.8 (6.0)	36.1 (2.3)	29.6 (−1.3)	24.3 (−4.3)	18.5 (−7.5)	30.4 (−0.9)
Mean minimum °F (°C)	−1.9 (−18.8)	2.7 (−16.3)	10.7 (−11.8)	21.2 (−6.0)	25.7 (−3.5)	31.6 (−0.2)	35.5 (1.9)	33.8 (1.0)	26.8 (−2.9)	18.1 (−7.7)	9.6 (−12.4)	1.7 (−16.8)	−6.9 (−21.6)
Record low °F (°C)	−34 (−37)	−44 (−42)	−24 (−31)	4 (−16)	21 (−6)	25 (−4)	29 (−2)	24 (−4)	10 (−12)	1 (−17)	−19 (−28)	−33 (−36)	−44 (−42)
Average precipitation inches (mm)	5.50 (140)	4.09 (104)	4.35 (110)	4.03 (102)	3.83 (97)	3.34 (85)	1.27 (32)	1.01 (26)	1.61 (41)	3.42 (87)	4.91 (125)	5.70 (145)	43.06 (1,094)
Average snowfall inches (cm)	32.2 (82)	23.4 (59)	10.8 (27)	4.5 (11)	0.0 (0.0)	0.0 (0.0)	0.0 (0.0)	0.0 (0.0)	0.0 (0.0)	0.4 (1.0)	10.7 (27)	31.6 (80)	113.6 (287)
Average extreme snow depth inches (cm)	29.0 (74)	29.7 (75)	22.9 (58)	6.8 (17)	0.5 (1.3)	0.0 (0.0)	0.0 (0.0)	0.0 (0.0)	0.0 (0.0)	0.4 (1.0)	6.5 (17)	19.5 (50)	38.4 (98)
Average precipitation days (≥ 0.01 in)	16.1	14.0	15.3	14.4	12.3	11.7	4.8	4.3	6.2	12.0	14.9	17.6	143.6
Average snowy days (≥ 0.1 in)	10.7	8.9	6.3	2.2	0.1	0.0	0.0	0.0	0.0	0.4	4.9	11.7	45.2
Source 1: NOAA
Source 2: National Weather Service

== Demographics ==
Historical population
Census	Pop.	Note	%±
1940	381		—
1950	544		42.8%
1960	522		−4.0%
1970	1,218		133.3%
1980	1,060		−13.0%
1990	746		−29.6%
2000	617		−17.3%
2010	508		−17.7%
2020	467		−8.1%
U.S. Decennial Census

As of 2000 the median income for a household in the city was $34,318, and the median income for a family was $36,667. Males had a median income of $36,250 versus $24,375 for females. The per capita income for the city was $13,980. About 14.7% of families and 18.5% of the population were below the poverty line, including 27.4% of those under age 18 and none of those age 65 or over.

=== 2010 census ===
As of the census of 2010, there were 508 people, 235 households, and 150 families residing in the city. The population density was 619.5 inhabitants per square mile (239.2/km^{2}). There were 296 housing units at an average density of 361.0 per square mile (139.4/km^{2}). The racial makeup of the city was 94.3% White, 1.8% Native American, 0.2% Asian, 1.8% from other races, and 2.0% from two or more races. Hispanic or Latino of any race were 3.1% of the population.

There were 235 households, of which 18.7% had children under the age of 18 living with them, 57.4% were married couples living together, 3.8% had a female householder with no husband present, 2.6% had a male householder with no wife present, and 36.2% were non-families. 30.2% of all households were made up of individuals, and 13.2% had someone living alone who was 65 years of age or older. The average household size was 2.16 and the average family size was 2.67.

The median age in the city was 51 years. 16.7% of residents were under the age of 18; 4.8% were between the ages of 18 and 24; 15.9% were from 25 to 44; 39.8% were from 45 to 64; and 22.6% were 65 years of age or older. The gender makeup of the city was 54.7% male and 45.3% female.

=== Population history ===
- 1863 - 275
- 1864 - 131

== Notable people ==
- E. William Gollings – American painter of western life
