= Orofino, Idaho =

- City
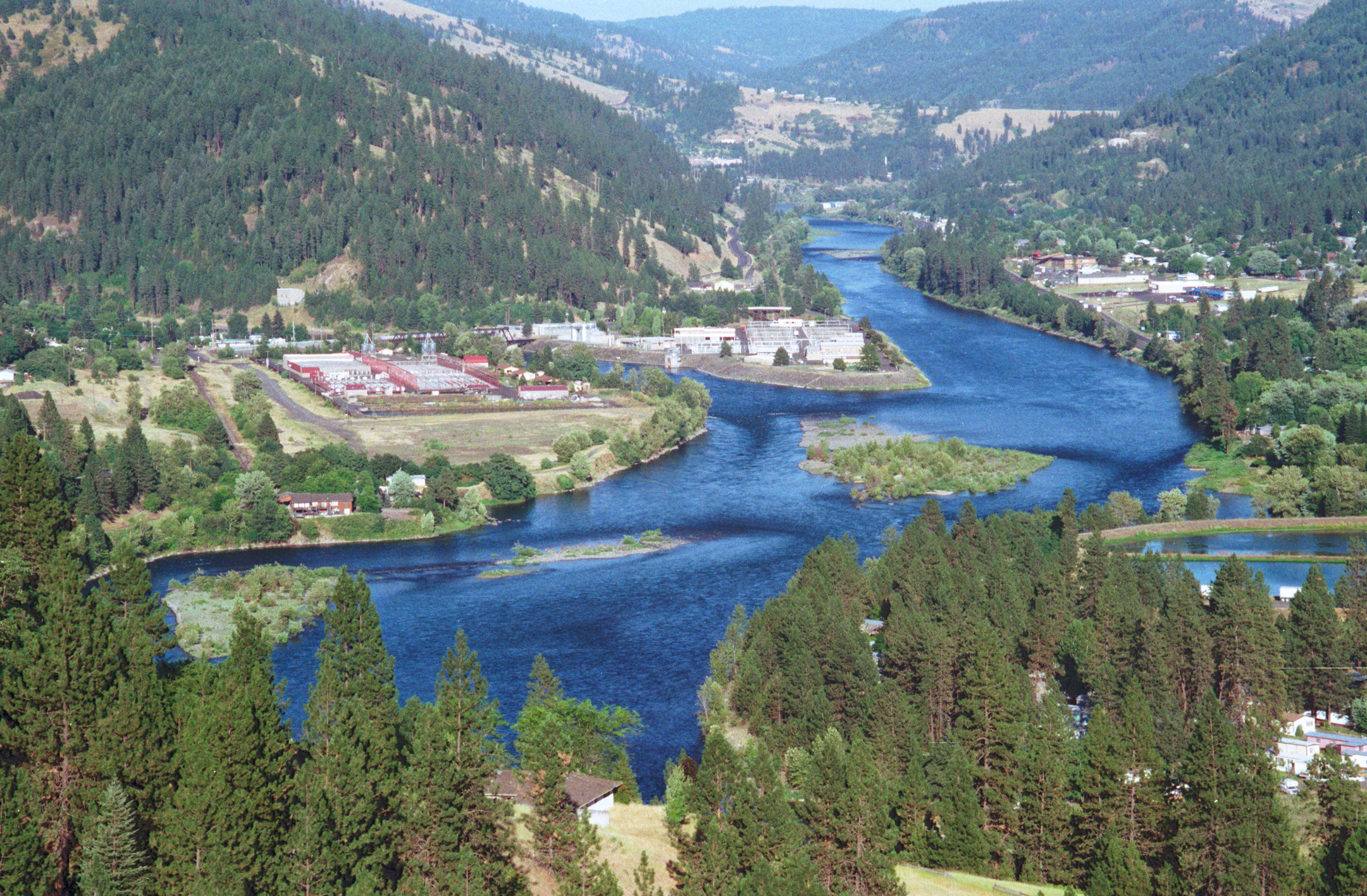
- Clearwater River near Orofino

- Location of Orofino in Clearwater County, Idaho.

- Location in the United States
- Coordinates: 46°29′08″N 116°14′32″W
- Country: United States
- State: Idaho
- County: Clearwater

Area
  - Total: 2.61 sq mi (6.76 km^{2})
  - Land: 2.46 sq mi (6.38 km^{2})
  - Water: 0.15 sq mi (0.38 km^{2})
- Elevation: 1,286 ft (392 m)

Population (2020)
  - Total: 2,656
  - Density: 1,257.8/sq mi (485.63/km^{2})
- Time zone: UTC-8 (Pacific (PST))
  - Summer (DST): UTC-7 (PDT)
- ZIP code: 83544
- Area code: 208
- FIPS code: 16-59320
- GNIS feature ID: 2411336
- Website: www.cityoforofino.org

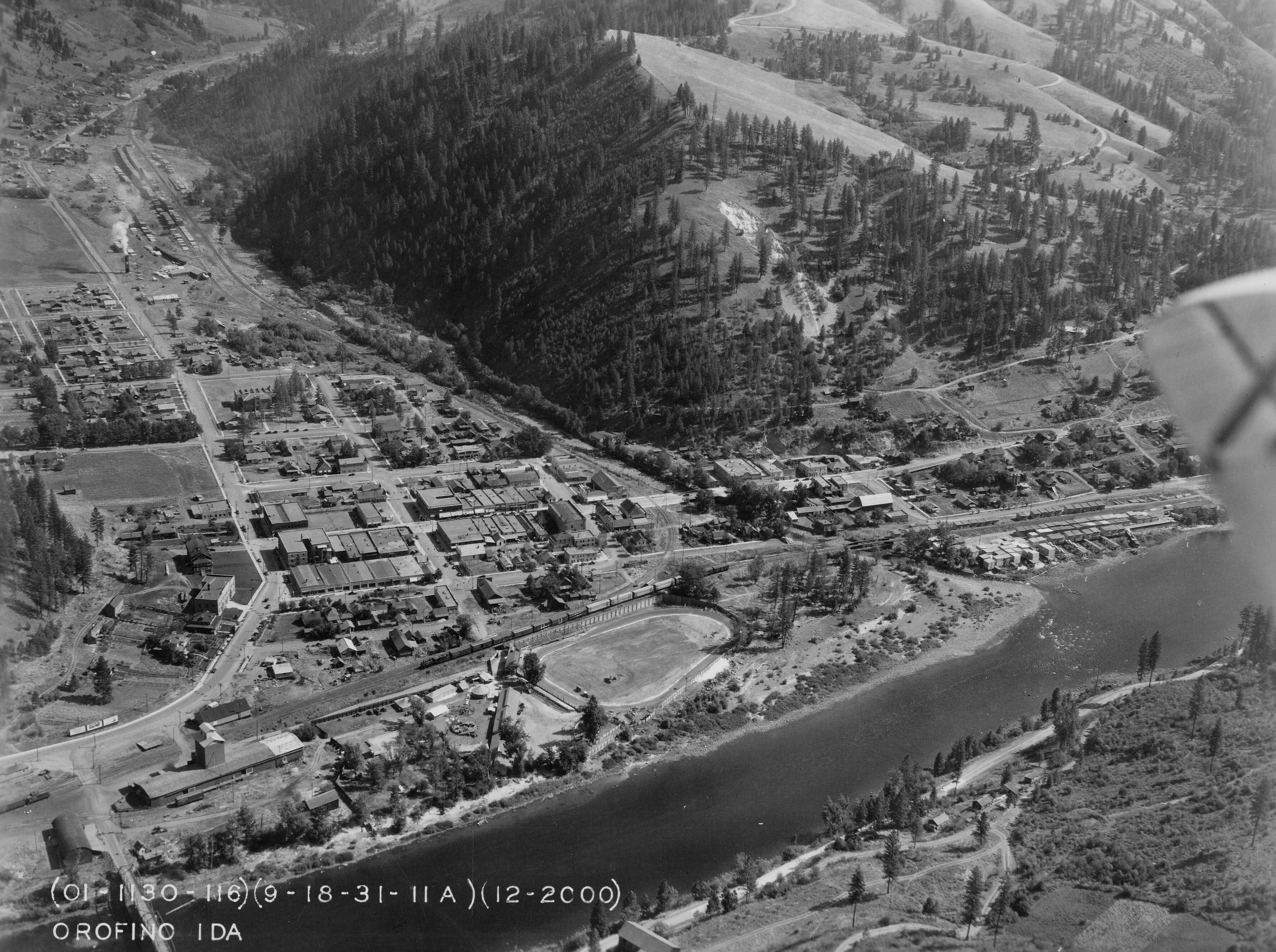
View of Orofino, 1931

Orofino oro-FEE-noh; ("fine gold" [ore] in Spanish) is a city in and the county seat of Clearwater County, Idaho, United States, along Orofino Creek and the north bank of the Clearwater River. It is the major city within the Nez Perce Indian Reservation. The population was 2,656 at the time of the 2020 census.

Nearby is the historical "Canoe Camp," where the Lewis and Clark expedition built five new dugout canoes and embarked on October 7, 1805, downstream to the Pacific Ocean. Some four miles (6 km) north is the Dworshak Dam, third-highest dam in the United States, completed in the early 1970s. Nearby is the Dworshak National Fish Hatchery, started to try to compensate for the loss of migratory fish upstream after the dam was constructed.

Originally the name was two words, Oro Fino, applied to a gold mining camp established in 1861 two miles (3 km) south of Pierce. When the United States government opened up the Nez Percé reservation to non-tribal settlers in 1895, thousands of European Americans rushed to lay claims to land. Clifford Fuller set up a trading post on his new homestead. The town (Orofino-on-the-Clearwater) was established the next year. The railroad, later part of the Camas Prairie Railroad, was constructed from Lewiston in 1899.

Orofino is home to state institutions: Idaho State Hospital North and the Idaho Correctional Institution–Orofino. These two facilities are located adjacent to Orofino High School, which includes the junior high or middle school grades, and whose mascot is the Maniac.

Orofino hosts an annual July 4 celebration, as well as the Clearwater County Fair and Lumberjack Days in late summer. Each spring, Boomershoot, an annual precision rifle event, is held nearby.

== Geography ==
According to the United States Census Bureau, the city has a total area of 2.47 square miles (6.40 km^{2}), of which 2.33 square miles (6.03 km^{2}) is land and 0.14 square miles (0.36 km^{2}) is water.

=== Climate ===
The city has a climate typical of low-elevation areas in Idaho and eastern Washington. Orofino has a dry-summer continental climate (Köppen Dsb). Due to the warm summers, it nearly qualifies as a continental Mediterranean climate (Dsa). Idaho's all-time highest temperature of 118 °F or 47.8 °C was recorded at Orofino on July 28, 1934.

Climate data for Orofino, Idaho (1971-2000)
Month	Jan	Feb	Mar	Apr	May	Jun	Jul	Aug	Sep	Oct	Nov	Dec	Year
Record high °F (°C)	62 (17)	68 (20)	82 (28)	98 (37)	105 (41)	115 (46)	118 (48)	116 (47)	107 (42)	92 (33)	71 (22)	62 (17)	118 (48)
Mean daily maximum °F (°C)	37.7 (3.2)	45.8 (7.7)	55.4 (13.0)	64.0 (17.8)	72.0 (22.2)	79.7 (26.5)	88.9 (31.6)	90.2 (32.3)	78.8 (26.0)	63.2 (17.3)	46.1 (7.8)	37.3 (2.9)	63.3 (17.4)
Mean daily minimum °F (°C)	25.2 (−3.8)	28.0 (−2.2)	32.0 (0.0)	37.8 (3.2)	44.1 (6.7)	50.3 (10.2)	53.7 (12.1)	52.9 (11.6)	45.3 (7.4)	36.4 (2.4)	31.1 (−0.5)	26.2 (−3.2)	38.6 (3.7)
Record low °F (°C)	−11 (−24)	−9 (−23)	12 (−11)	27 (−3)	28 (−2)	35 (2)	41 (5)	39 (4)	28 (−2)	15 (−9)	1 (−17)	−15 (−26)	−15 (−26)
Average precipitation inches (mm)	2.91 (74)	2.66 (68)	2.53 (64)	2.40 (61)	2.59 (66)	1.67 (42)	1.06 (27)	0.88 (22)	1.24 (31)	1.98 (50)	3.38 (86)	3.29 (84)	26.59 (675)
Average snowfall inches (cm)	12.0 (30)	3.9 (9.9)	1.3 (3.3)	0.1 (0.25)	0.0 (0.0)	0.0 (0.0)	0.0 (0.0)	0.0 (0.0)	0.0 (0.0)	0.0 (0.0)	1.3 (3.3)	7.9 (20)	26.5 (66.75)
Source 1: NOAA (normals, 1971-2000)
Source 2: Western Regional Climate Centre (snowfall, 1948-1981)

== Demographics ==
Historical population
Census	Pop.	Note	%±
1910	384		—
1920	537		39.8%
1930	1,078		100.7%
1940	1,602		48.6%
1950	1,656		3.4%
1960	2,471		49.2%
1970	3,883		57.1%
1980	3,711		−4.4%
1990	2,868		−22.7%
2000	3,247		13.2%
2010	3,142		−3.2%
2020	2,656		−15.5%
U.S. Decennial Census

=== 2020 census ===
As of the 2020 census, Orofino had a population of 2,656. The median age was 45.7 years. 20.8% of residents were under the age of 18 and 27.4% of residents were 65 years of age or older. For every 100 females there were 102.3 males, and for every 100 females age 18 and over there were 95.7 males age 18 and over.

0.0% of residents lived in urban areas, while 100.0% lived in rural areas.

There were 1,103 households in Orofino, of which 26.4% had children under the age of 18 living in them. Of all households, 47.8% were married-couple households, 20.0% were households with a male householder and no spouse or partner present, and 23.8% were households with a female householder and no spouse or partner present. About 31.1% of all households were made up of individuals and 17.4% had someone living alone who was 65 years of age or older.

There were 1,236 housing units, of which 10.8% were vacant. The homeowner vacancy rate was 1.5% and the rental vacancy rate was 7.0%.

Racial composition as of the 2020 census
Race	Number	Percent
White	2,417	91.0%
Black or African American	8	0.3%
American Indian and Alaska Native	45	1.7%
Asian	20	0.8%
Native Hawaiian and Other Pacific Islander	2	0.1%
Some other race	37	1.4%
Two or more races	127	4.8%
Hispanic or Latino (of any race)	113	4.3%

=== 2010 census ===
As of the census of 2010, there were 3,142 people, 1,167 households, and 698 families residing in the city. The population density was 1,348.5 inhabitants per square mile (520.7/km^{2}). There were 1,285 housing units at an average density of 551.5 units per square mile (212.9 units/km^{2}). The racial makeup of the city was 91.7% White, 0.5% African American, 2.5% Native American, 1.4% Asian, 0.3% Pacific Islander, 1.2% from other races, and 2.4% from two or more races. Hispanic or Latino of any race were 4.3% of the population.

There were 1,167 households, of which 24.3% had children under the age of 18 living with them, 46.4% were married couples living together, 9.3% had a female householder with no husband present, 4.2% had a male householder with no wife present, and 40.2% were non-families. 34.8% of all households were made up of individuals, and 17.5% had someone living alone who was 65 years of age or older. The average household size was 2.17 and the average family size was 2.77.

The median age in the city was 43.7 years. 17% of residents were under the age of 18; 7.2% were between the ages of 18 and 24; 27.3% were from 25 to 44; 28.3% were from 45 to 64; and 20.1% were 65 years of age or older. The gender makeup of the city was 58.3% male and 41.7% female.

=== 2000 census ===
As of the census of 2000, there were 3,247 people, 1,137 households, and 767 families residing in the city. The population density was 1,349.0 inhabitants per square mile (520.9/km^{2}). There were 1,279 housing units at an average density of 531.4 units per square mile (205.2 units/km^{2}). The racial makeup of the city was 93.93% White, 0.37% African American, 2.13% Native American, 0.59% Asian, 0.09% Pacific Islander, 0.99% from other races, and 1.91% from two or more races. Hispanic or Latino of any race were 2.25% of the population.

There were 1,137 households, out of which 28.9% had children under the age of 18 living with them, 54.1% were married couples living together, 8.4% had a female householder with no husband present, and 32.5% were non-families. 27.6% of all households were made up of individuals, and 12.8% had someone living alone who was 65 years of age or older. The average household size was 2.33 and the average family size was 2.83.

In the city, the population was spread out, with 20.1% under the age of 18, 7.9% from 18 to 24, 30.4% from 25 to 44, 26.1% from 45 to 64, and 15.6% who were 65 years of age or older. The median age was 40 years. For every 100 females, there were 132.9 males. For every 100 females age 18 and over, there were 143.2 males.

The median income for a household in the city was $30,580, and the median income for a family was $36,908. Males had a median income of $30,386 versus $20,968 for females. The per capita income for the city was $14,563. About 7.6% of families and 12.1% of the population were below the poverty line, including 16.3% of those under age 18 and 7.1% of those age 65 or over.

== Government and infrastructure ==
The city government is small due to the limited number of residents.

Major facilities are run by the state, which operates the Idaho State Hospital North here. In addition, the Idaho Department of Correction operates the Idaho Correctional Institution-Orofino here.

The United States Postal Service operates the Orofino Post Office.

== Transportation ==
The city is served by US 12, a two-lane undivided highway on the south bank of the Clearwater River, connected to Orofino by a bridge. The highway connects to Lewiston to the west and Missoula, Montana (over Lolo Pass) to the east. The route is known as the "Northwest Passage Scenic Byway," a National Scenic Byway. The population is dependent on cars. Most areas have few or no sidewalks. Orofino Municipal Airport (KS68) is available for those traveling by small aircraft.
