= Weippe, Idaho =

- City

- Location of Weippe in Clearwater County, Idaho.
- Coordinates: 46°22′38″N 115°56′22″W
- Country: United States
- State: Idaho
- County: Clearwater

Area
  - Total: 0.40 sq mi (1.04 km^{2})
  - Land: 0.40 sq mi (1.03 km^{2})
  - Water: 0.0039 sq mi (0.01 km^{2})
- Elevation: 3,028 ft (923 m)

Population (2020)
  - Total: 400
  - Density: 1,000/sq mi (390/km^{2})
- Time zone: UTC-8 (Pacific (PST))
  - Summer (DST): UTC-7 (PDT)
- ZIP code: 83553
- Area code: 208
- FIPS code: 16-86050
- GNIS feature ID: 2412204
- Website: cityofweippe.org

Weippe (/ˈwiːaɪp/ or /wiˈaɪp/) is a city in Clearwater County, Idaho, United States. The population was 400 at the 2020 census, down from 441 in 2010. In September 1805, the starving Lewis and Clark Expedition first met the Nez Perce on the Weippe Prairie, south of the city.

== Geography ==
According to the United States Census Bureau, the city has a total area of 0.42 square miles (1.09 km^{2}), all of it land.

== Demographics ==
Historical population
Census	Pop.	Note	%±
1970	713		—
1980	828		16.1%
1990	532		−35.7%
2000	416		−21.8%
2010	441		6.0%
2020	400		−9.3%
U.S. Decennial Census

=== 2010 census ===
At the 2010 census there were 441 people in 198 households, including 121 families, in the city. The population density was 1,050.0 inhabitants per square mile (405.4/km^{2}). There were 230 housing units at an average density of 547.6 per square mile (211.4/km^{2}). The racial makeup of the city was 98.4% White, 0.7% Native American, 0.2% Asian, 0.2% from other races, and 0.5% from two or more races. Hispanic or Latino of any race were 1.8%.

Of the 198 households, 24.2% had children under the age of 18 living with them, 46.0% were married couples living together, 11.1% had a female householder with no husband present, 4.0% had a male householder with no wife present, and 38.9% were non-families. 31.3% of households were one person, and 16.2% were one person aged 65 or older. The average household size was 2.23 and the average family size was 2.77.

The median age was 48.4 years. 20.9% of residents were under the age of 18; 6% were between the ages of 18 and 24; 17.4% were from 25 to 44; 32% were from 45 to 64; and 23.6% were 65 or older. The gender makeup of the city was 48.5% male and 51.5% female.

=== 2000 census ===
At the 2000 census there were 416 people in 161 households, including 119 families, in the city. The population density was 1,009.8 inhabitants per square mile (389.9/km^{2}). There were 198 housing units at an average density of 480.6 per square mile (185.6/km^{2}). The; racial makeup of the city was 97.12% White, 0.24% African American, 1.20% Native American, 0.72% from other races, and 0.72% from two or more races. Hispanic or Latino of any race were 0.96%.

Of the 161 households, 36.6% had children under the age of 18 living with them, 56.5% were married couples living together, 12.9% had a female householder with no husband present, and 25.5% were non-families. 20.5% of households were built up of individuals, and 10.6% were one person aged 65 or older. The average household size was 2.58 and the average family size was 2.95.

The age distribution was 29.3% under the age of 18, 6.7% from 18 to 24, 22.1% from 25 to 44, 26.4% from 45 to 64, and 15.4% 65 or older. The median age was 38 years. For every 100 females, there were 101.9 males. For every 100 females age 18 and over, there were 90.9 males.

The median household income was $26,442 and the total income for a family was $28,281. Males had a median income of $30,694 versus $17,500 for females. The per capita income for the city was $13,175. About 16.8% of families and 24.8% of the population were below the poverty line, including 36.3% of those under age 18 and 19.7% of those age 65 or over.
