= Kooskia Internment Camp =

Former internment camp in Idaho, U.S.

- Idaho County, Idaho
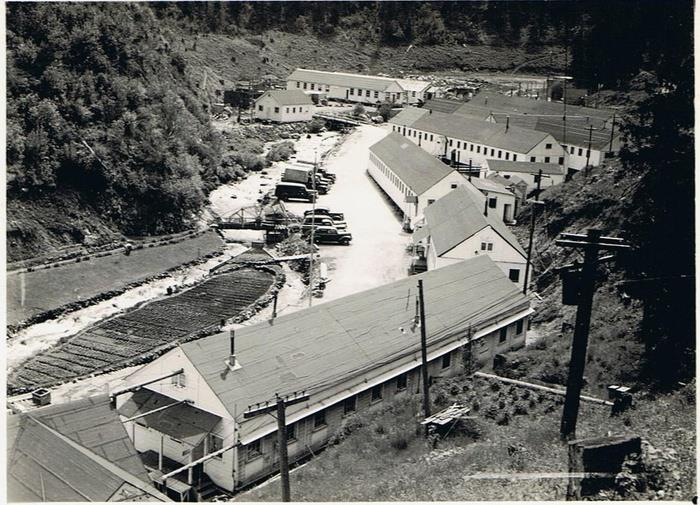

Site information
- Type: Japanese incarceration work camp
- Owner: U.S. Department of Justice
- Operator: Immigration and Naturalization Service (INS) 1943–1945; Federal Bureau of Prisons; 1935–1943

Location
- Coordinates: 46.21°N 115.543°W

Site history
- Built: 1933
- Built by: Civilian Conservation Corps

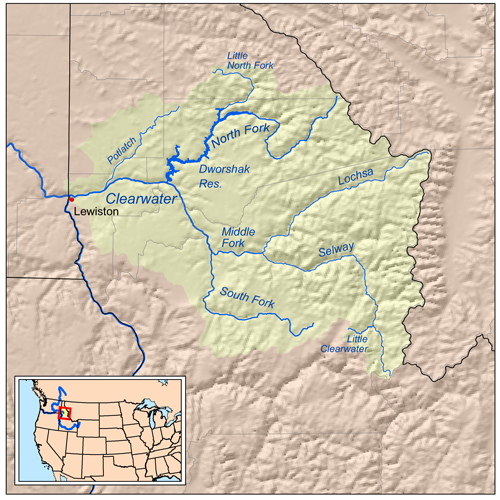
Clearwater River drainage in north central Idaho

The Kooskia Internment Camp (/ˈkuːskiː/ KOO-skee) is a former internment camp in the northwest United States, located in north central Idaho, about thirty miles (50 km) northeast of Kooskia in northern Idaho County. It operated during the final two years of World War II.

Originally a remote highway work camp (F-38) of the Civilian Conservation Corps in 1933, it became Federal Prison Camp No. 11 in 1935, run by the Federal Bureau of Prisons.

== World War II ==
During World War II in 1943, it was converted to house more than 250 interned Japanese men, most of whom were longtime U.S. residents, but not citizens, branded "enemy aliens." Because the camp was so remote in the western Bitterroot Mountains, fences and guard towers were unnecessary. It was run by the Immigration and Naturalization Service (INS) of the Department of Justice.

The government put the internees to labor work to construct the Lewis and Clark highway, where they were paid about fifty to sixty dollars per month. Most had volunteered from other camps to earn some money.

=== Location ===
An archaeological project of the University of Idaho in Moscow, the site is six miles (10 km) northeast of Lowell on U.S. Route 12, just above the north bank of the Lochsa River along Canyon Creek, at an approximate elevation of 1,600 feet (490 m) above sea level. The mouth of Canyon Creek is just below milepost 104 of US 12.

=== Notable internees ===
- Toraichi Kono

== After the war ==
The two-lane highway was completed seventeen years later in 1962, connecting to Montana at Lolo Pass at 5,233 feet (1,595 m) and eastward to Lolo and Missoula.

Originally labeled State Route 9, it was approved as US 12 in Idaho in June 1962. Its extension westward from Lewiston through Washington to Aberdeen was approved in 1967, taking over much of US 410, which was decommissioned.

== See also ==
- Minidoka War Relocation Center, in south central Idaho
