= U.S. Route 12 =

Numbered US Highway in the United States

U.S. Route 12
- US 12 highlighted in red

Route information
- Length: 2,482 mi (3,994 km)
- Existed: November 11, 1926–present

Major junctions
- West end: US 101 at Aberdeen, WA
- I-5 near Chehalis, WA; I-15 at Helena, MT; I-94 at various locations; I-29 / US 81 at Summit, SD; I-35W at Minneapolis, MN; I-35E / US 10 / US 52 at St Paul, MN; I-39 / I-90 at Madison, WI; I-55 at Hodgkins, IL; I-65 / I-90 at Gary, IN; I-69 at Coldwater, MI
- East end: Cass Avenue in Detroit, MI

Location
- Country: United States
- States: Washington, Idaho, Montana, North Dakota, South Dakota, Minnesota, Wisconsin, Illinois, Indiana, Michigan

Highway system
- United States Numbered Highway System; List; Special; Divided
← US 11	→ US 13

U.S. Route 12 or U.S. Highway 12 (US 12) is an east–west United States Numbered Highway, running from Aberdeen, Washington, to Detroit, Michigan, for almost 2,500 miles (4,000 km). The highway has mostly been superseded by Interstate 90 (I-90) and I-94, but, unlike most U.S. Highways that have been superseded by an Interstate, US 12 remains intact as an important link for local and regional destinations. The highway's western terminus in Aberdeen is at an intersection with US 101, while the highway's eastern terminus in Downtown Detroit is at the corner of Michigan and Cass avenues, near Campus Martius Park.

== Route description ==
Lengths
	mi	km
WA	431	694
ID	174	280
MT	598	962
ND	87	140
SD	319	513
MN	193	311
WI	339	546
IL	85	137
IN	46	74
MI	210	340
Total	2,482	3,994

=== Washington ===
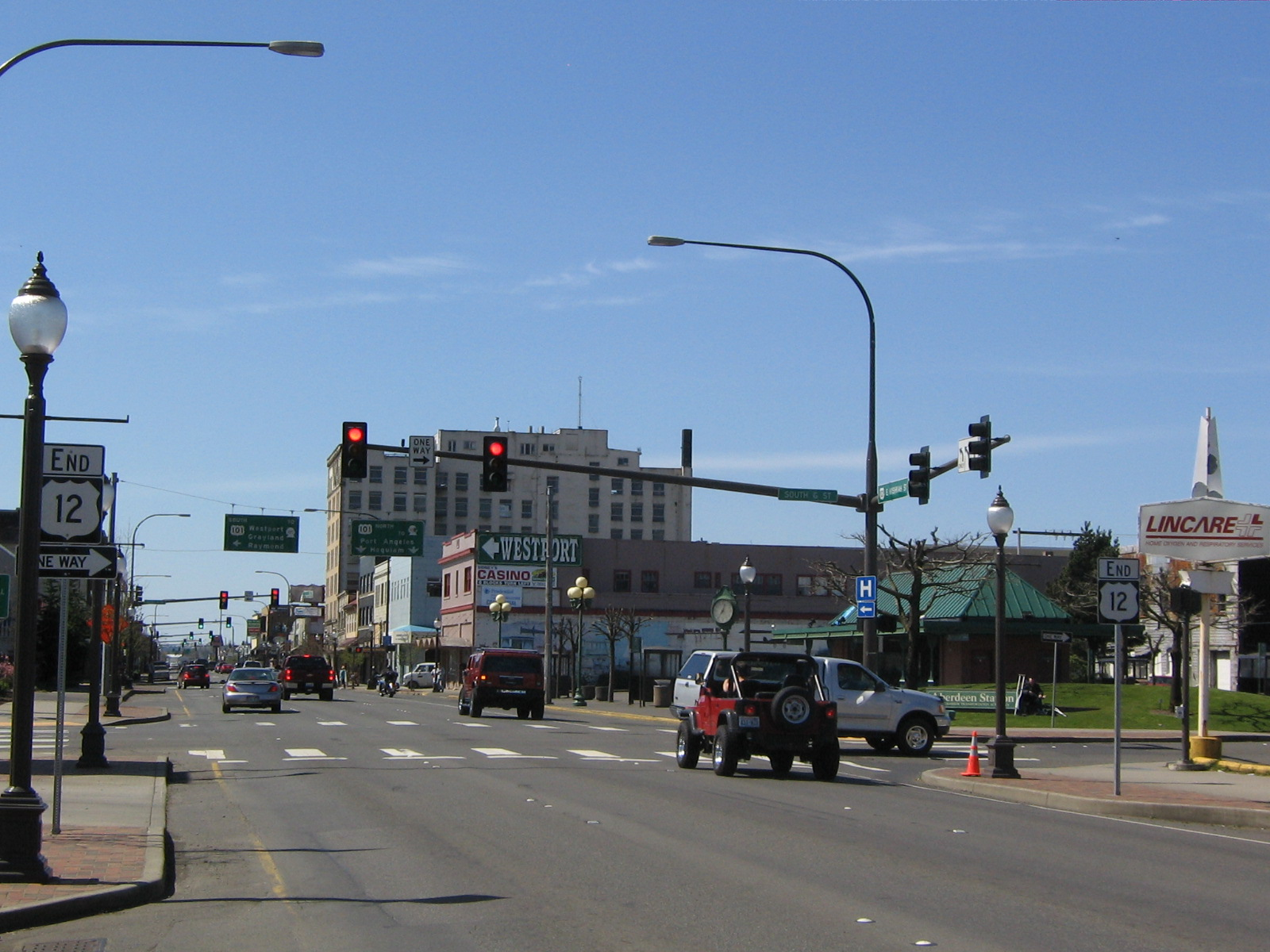
Western terminus at US 101 in Aberdeen, Washington

The western terminus of US 12 is located in Aberdeen. The highway loosely follows the eastbound leg of the Lewis and Clark Expedition, between Wallula and Clarkston, thus being marked as part of the Lewis and Clark National Historic Trail. The east end of the highway in the state is at Clarkston, where the highway crosses the Snake River into Idaho at Lewiston, Idaho.

The Washington section of US 12, other than a concurrency with I-5, is defined at Washington Revised Code § 47.17.055.

=== Idaho ===
US 12 enters the state at Lewiston, crossing the Snake River from Clarkston, Washington. It ascends the Clearwater River, running concurrently with US 95 for seven miles (11 km). It reduces to a two-lane undivided highway with signs that read "winding road next 99 miles [159 km]" and goes on to Orofino, continuing up the middle fork of that river to Lowell, the junction of the Lochsa and Selway rivers. It continues up the Lochsa and climbs to Lolo Pass at the Montana border. This portion of the highway is also designated as part of the Lewis and Clark National Historic Trail. Most of the highway in Idaho is within Clearwater National Forest. The eastern section of US 12, through remote mountain forest and up to Lolo Pass, was built in the early 1960s, making it the last U.S. Highway constructed. No services are available between Lowell and Powell, about 70 miles (110 km) further east.

=== Montana ===
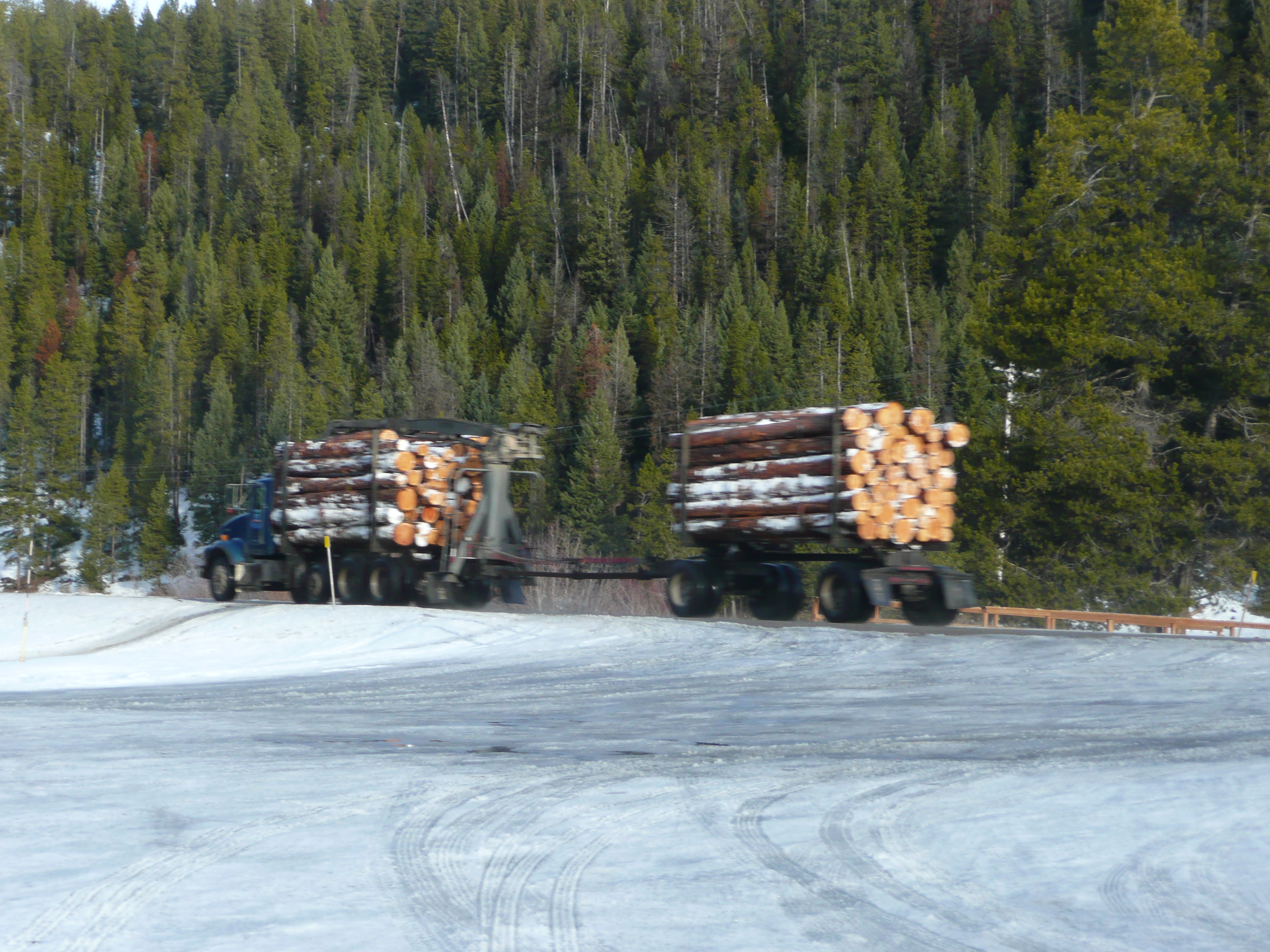
Logging truck at Lolo Hot Springs, Montana

US 12 in Montana has been defined as the Lewis and Clark Highway despite not being the route followed by Lewis and Clark across the state.

US 12's 598 miles (962 km) through Montana's mountains and plains is the greatest distance that US 12 traverses through any state. The highway enters Montana at Lolo Pass, seven miles (11 km) southwest of Lolo Hot Springs in Lolo National Forest. After passing Lolo Peak to the south and traveling east for 33 miles (53 km), it meets with US 93 at Lolo and continues as a concurrency northeast for 7.5 miles (12.1 km), where US 93 heads due north on Reserve Street, toward Glacier National Park. US 12 continues northeast through Missoula's downtown, eventually meeting I-90. It then overlaps I-90 for 69 miles (111 km) until Garrison, where it heads east toward Helena for 48.8 miles (78.5 km). This two-lane section of the trip passes through Avon and Elliston winding through Helena National Forest, over the Continental Divide at MacDonald Pass, and then through Montana's capital city, Helena. US 12 passes over I-15, at which point it joins US 287 south. US 12 overlaps US 287 and heads southeast, toward Townsend for 33.4 miles (53.8 km), where it splits from US 287, which heads south for 30 miles (48 km) toward the intersection of I-90 near the town of Three Forks. US 12 heads east toward White Sulphur Springs for 42.2 miles (67.9 km). The route joins US 89 for 8.4 miles (13.5 km) before entering White Sulphur Springs and for another three miles (4.8 km) east of town. US 89 splits north and US 12 continues east on its own for 233 miles (375 km), until the junction with I-94 at Forsyth as a concurrency northeast for 45.8 miles (73.7 km), to Miles City. At the east exit for Miles City, US 12 splits again from I-94 and heads almost directly east to the North Dakota border at a distance of 92.4 miles (148.7 km).

=== North Dakota ===
US 12 is a two-lane undivided highway that runs 87.47 miles (140.77 km), through Adams, Bowman, and Slope counties in southwest North Dakota. The speed limit is 65 mph (105 km/h) on rural segments, with slower posted speeds within the cities of Marmarth, Rhame, Bowman, Scranton, and Hettinger. US 12 meets with US 85 in Bowman, and the routes are concurrent for a short distance through the city.

=== South Dakota ===
US 12 enters South Dakota from North Dakota as a rural two-lane highway about 10 miles (16 km) west-northwest of Lemmon before entering the Standing Rock Indian Reservation. For approximately the next 70 miles (110 km), US 12 runs parallel to the border of North Dakota, sometimes within less than a mile (1.6 km). At Walker, US 12 heads southeast for 37 miles (60 km), where it crosses the Missouri River at Mobridge, exiting the reservation. From there, it continues east for 18 miles (29 km), until it meets with US 83 near Selby. It overlaps US 83 for seven miles (11 km). After leaving US 83, it turns due east and spends about 80 miles (130 km) as a rural two-lane highway again. A few miles before reaching Aberdeen, it becomes an at-grade expressway. After the junction with US 281, it goes back to being two lanes for a few miles through Aberdeen and past Aberdeen Regional Airport, before once again becoming a four-lane expressway, until two miles (3.2 km) before Waubay. East of Waubay, it becomes again an at-grade expressway until it meets with I-29 near Summit. The speed limit from Aberdeen to I-29 is 70 mph (110 km/h) except through the communities of Groton, Webster, and Waubay. From there, it heads southeast 22 miles (35 km) until Milbank. At Milbank, it continues east for 12 miles (19 km), until it crosses into Minnesota at Big Stone City, just south of Big Stone Lake. The South Dakota section of US 12 is legally defined at South Dakota Codified Laws § 31 April 132.

=== Minnesota ===
From the South Dakota–Minnesota state line at Ortonville to Wayzata, US 12 is mostly a rural two-lane highway with a 60-mile-per-hour (97 km/h) speed limit, with slower speed limits through towns and a four-lane surface arterial segment through the city of Willmar. From western Wayzata to I-394 in Minnetonka, US 12 is a six-lane freeway. East of I-494, US 12 is invisibly concurrent with I-394 and I-94 through Minneapolis and Saint Paul to the Minnesota–Wisconsin state line at Hudson.

The Minnesota section of US 12 is defined as Routes 149, 26, and 10 in Minnesota Statutes §§ 161.115(80) and 161.114(2).

=== Wisconsin ===
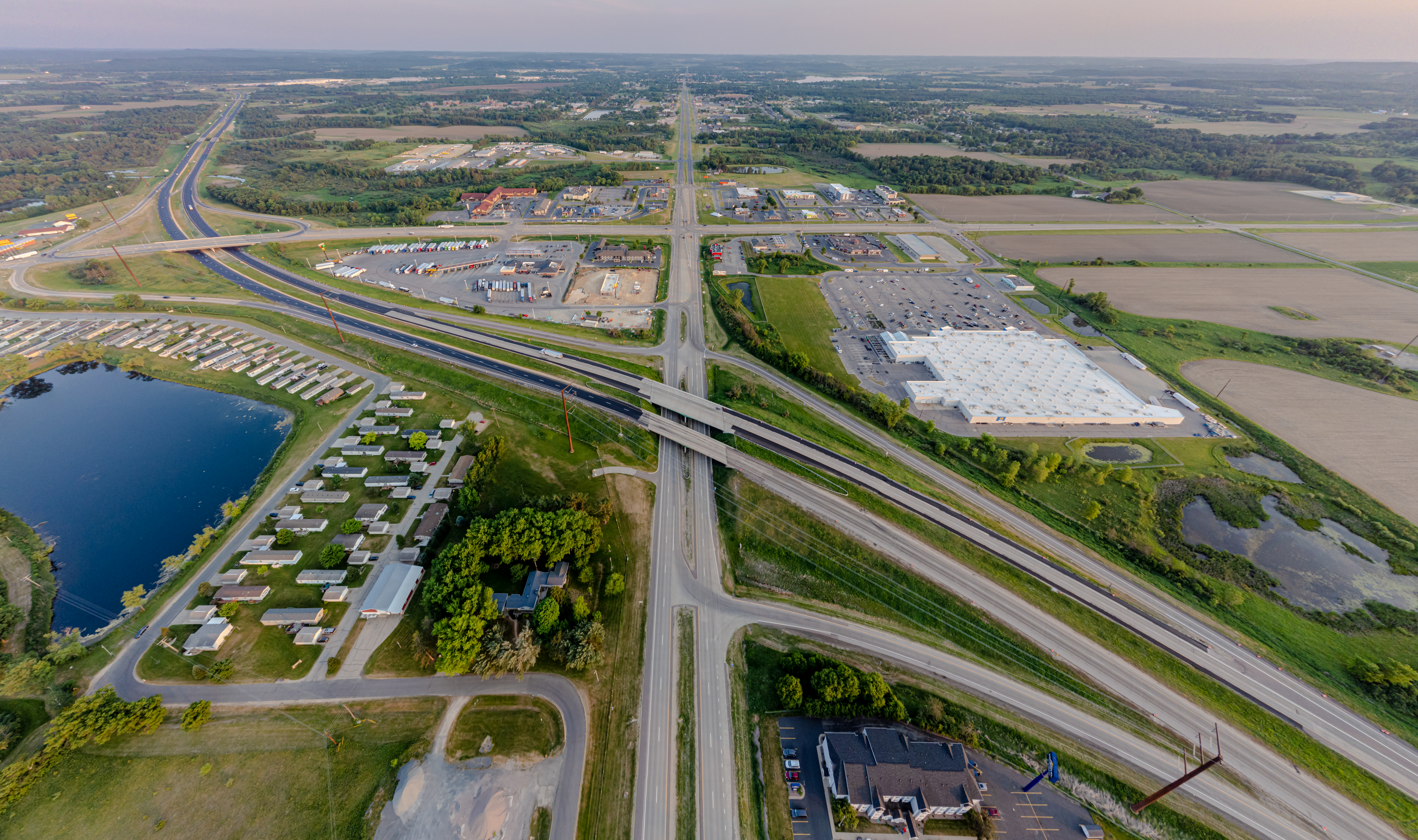
US 12 through Tomah, Wisconsin, looking south from I-94

US 12 crosses the St. Croix River from Lakeland, Minnesota, into Hudson, running concurrently with I-94 before splitting just east of the city. It mainly follows a similar path to I-94 to the north, before crossing under I-94 into downtown Menomonie before continuing in an easterly direction through Eau Claire. In Fall Creek, US 12 turns southeasterly toward Fairchild, it then runs concurrently with US 10 going east for just 2.5 miles (4.0 km) before returning to its course southeast bound. US 12 eventually recrosses I-94 into Black River Falls and then parallels I-94 in a southeastward direction. US 12 also runs through Millston and Kirby. Afterward, it turns directly south to Tomah, where it becomes North Superior Avenue. It alternates between a four- and two-lane road on its way through downtown. It then turns east for 4.5 miles (7.2 km), then parallels I-90/I-94 through Camp Douglas, New Lisbon, Mauston, and Lyndon Station before crossing under the pair of Interstates into downtown Wisconsin Dells. US 12 turns south to Baraboo and runs along the western edge of Devil's Lake State Park. In Sauk City, US 12 turns southeast toward Madison and runs along the city's western and southern edges. Here, it becomes a four- to eight-lane freeway with US 14 and US 18 known by the locals as "The Beltline". On the southeast side of the city, it crosses I-39/I-90 toward Cambridge. It turns southeast here and runs through Fort Atkinson and Whitewater. In Elkhorn, US 12 becomes a four-lane freeway with a 70-mile-per-hour (110 km/h) speed limit. It returns to a two-lane road at the Wisconsin–Illinois state line at Genoa City.

=== Illinois ===
In Illinois, US 12 is an arterial surface road that runs from Richmond, southeast to Des Plaines. It then turns due south, continuing through the Chicago metropolitan area, joining with US 45. In Stone Park, US 20 joins US 12/US 45. In Hickory Hills, US 45 continues south, while US 12/US 20 runs due east along 95th Street in the southwest suburbs. From Hickory Hills, US 12/US 20 runs east nearly to the Lake Michigan lakefront and then joins with US 41, as all three routes travel southeast into the state of Indiana.

US 12 is referred to as Rand Road in Chicago's northwest suburbs. Rand is an original name for the area around Des Plaines, the location where the road resumes its westerly direction. South of Des Plaines, US 12 follows Mannheim Road, La Grange Road, and then 95th Street, before merging with US 41 on Ewing and Indianapolis avenues toward the Indiana state line.

=== Indiana ===
In Indiana, US 12 is a historically significant route, that winds along the southern coast of Lake Michigan. It runs from an interchange with the Indiana Toll Road, concurrent with US 20 and US 41 in Whiting, to Michiana Shores, at the Michigan state line. A large portion of this segment is known as the Dunes Highway.

=== Michigan ===
US 12 is now the only U.S. Highway still serving Downtown Detroit, whose street grid was laid by Augustus B. Woodward, to have a five-way intersection of the roads that would become US 12, US 10, US 16, US 112 and US 25. US 24 still travels through Detroit from Puritan to 8 Mile Road (M-102) on the far west side.

As from the earliest days of its existence, US 12 enters Michigan from Indiana, southwest of New Buffalo, and continues to the old junction of US 12 and US 112 in New Buffalo. It is now assigned between New Buffalo and Detroit (except through Ypsilanti), along what was US 112 until 1962.

On May 4, 2004, the Michigan Department of Transportation (MDOT) designated 209 miles (336 km) of US 12 from New Buffalo to Detroit as a Michigan Heritage Route. The east–west corridor traverses the counties of Berrien, Cass, St. Joseph, Branch, Hillsdale, Lenawee, Washtenaw, and Wayne.

== History ==
Since the highway's creation in 1926, the eastern terminus has always remained within a few blocks of Cadillac Square in Downtown Detroit, Michigan.

- 1926: Cadillac Square at the convergence with US 10, US 16, US 25, and US 112; US 12 ran along Grand River. The original ending was at Miles City, Montana.
- 1939: The American Association of State Highway Officials (AASHO) approved a request to extend US 12 to Yellowstone National Park.
- 1956: US 12 was rerouted along the Lodge Freeway (M-10), ending on Jefferson Avenue; the terminus moved four blocks southeast, to the corner of Woodward Avenue (M-1/US 10) and Jefferson Avenue.
- 1959: Extended to Missoula, Montana.
- 1962: After I-94 was completed across Michigan, it was no longer cosigned with US 12. The US 12 route designation was moved to the former route of US 112, which was decommissioned. US 12 now runs along Michigan Avenue and again ends at Cadillac Square. It was extended to Lewiston, Idaho.
- 1967: Extended to Aberdeen, Washington, to its present terminus at US 101.
- 1970: US 10 was rerouted from Woodward to the Lodge Freeway and Jefferson Avenue. At this time US 12 was apparently extended along Woodward, to again terminate with US 10 at Woodward and Jefferson avenues, though with the designations flipflopped from their 1956 routing.
- 2001: The City of Detroit and MDOT, in a series of jurisdictional transfers, moved the terminus back four blocks, to again be at Cadillac Square.
- 2005: In another transfer, the US 12 terminus was truncated another four blocks, to end at the Patrick V. McNamara Federal Building, on the corner of Michigan and Cass avenues.

The western terminus was gradually extended westward, until it reached the Pacific Ocean.

=== Former ferry crossing ===
In 1925, US 12 in Michigan was originally proposed to run from Detroit to Ludington, across Lake Michigan, via the Pere Marquette Railway car ferry to Manitowoc, Wisconsin, and then continuing into Wisconsin, on what later became US 10, in those two states. The 1974 Golden Anniversary Celebration reprint of the 1926 Rand McNally Road Atlas shows US 12 following what later became the route of US 10 through Michigan, from Detroit, through Flint, Saginaw, Midland, and Clare on its way to Ludington.

=== Routing changes and proposals ===
US 12 was proposed to enter Wyoming on the current route of US 212 from Mammoth Hot Springs to a point northwest of Clark before its route in Montana was rerouted. It was also proposed to enter Oregon on the current route of US 730 from east-southeast of Boardman to a point northeast of Cold Springs, but that was canceled.

In the 1960s, a portion of US 12 in Western Washington was moved north to the town of Morton, when Mossyrock Dam was built on the Cowlitz River in Lewis County. A large portion of old, two-lane US 12 in the Yakima Valley was replaced by I-82 and I-182 in the 1980s, between Yakima and the Tri-Cities, though the freeways are still cosigned with the US 12 designation. The old two-lane highway now bears the name Wine Country Road.

== Major intersections ==
Washington
US 101 in Aberdeen
I-5 in Grand Mound. The highways travel concurrently to south-southeast of Napavine.
I-82 / US 97 in Yakima. I-82/US 12 travel concurrently to south of West Richland. US 12/US 97 travel concurrently to south of Union Gap.
I-82 / I-182 south of West Richland. I-182/US 12 travel concurrently to Pasco.
US 395 in Pasco. The highways travel concurrently through the city.
US 730 south-southwest of Wallula
Idaho
US 95 in Lewiston. The highways travel concurrently to north-northwest of Lapwai.
Montana
US 93 in Lolo. The highways travel concurrently to Missoula.
I-90 in Missoula. The highways travel concurrently to Garrison.
I-15 / US 287 in Helena. US 12/US 287 travel concurrently to Townsend.
US 89 south of White Sulphur Springs. The highways travel concurrently to northeast of White Sulphur Springs.
US 191 in Harlowton. The highways travel concurrently to east of Harlowton.
US 87 north of Klein. The highways travel concurrently to Roundup.
I-94 southwest of Forsyth. The highways travel concurrently to east-northeast of Miles City.
North Dakota
US 85 in Bowman. The highways travel concurrently through the city.
South Dakota
US 83 northwest of Selby. The highways travel concurrently to south of Selby.
US 281 in Aberdeen
I-29 / US 81 northwest of Summit
Minnesota
US 75 in Ortonville
US 59 north of Holloway
US 71 in Willmar
I-394 / I-494 in Minnetonka. I-394/US 12 travel concurrently to Minneapolis.
US 169 in St. Louis Park.
I-94 / I-394 / US 52 in Minneapolis. US 52 travel concurrently to Saint Paul. I-94/US 12 travel concurrently to east of Hudson.
I-35W in Minneapolis. The highways travel concurrently, on separate lanes, through the city.
I-35E in Saint Paul. The highways travel concurrently through the city.
I-35E / US 10 in Saint Paul. US 10/US 12 travel concurrently through the city.
US 61 in Saint Paul. The highways travel concurrently through the city.
I-494 / I-694 on the Woodbury–Oakdale city line.
Wisconsin
US 63 in Baldwin. The highways travel concurrently through the city.
I-94 northwest of Elk Mound
US 53 on the Eau Claire–Altoona city line
US 10 south of Fairchild. The highways travel concurrently to east-southeast of Fairchild.
I-94 in Black River Falls
I-94 in Tomah
I-90 in Tomah
I-90 / I-94 in the Town of Lyndon
I-90 / I-94 on the Lake Delton–Delton town line
US 14 in Middleton. The highways travel concurrently to Madison.
US 18 / US 151 in Madison. US 12/US 18 travel concurrently to Cambridge. US 12/US 151 travel concurrently through the city.
I-39 / I-90 in Madison
I-43 in Elkhorn
Illinois
US 45 in Des Plaines. The highways travel concurrently to west of the Palos Hills–Hickory Hills, Illinois city line.
US 14 in Des Plaines
I-190 west of Rosemont
US 20 on the Melrose Park–Stone Park city line. The highways travel concurrently to East Chicago, Indiana.
I-290 on the Westchester–Hillside–Bellwood city line
US 34 in La Grange
I-55 on the Countryside–Hodgkins city line
I-294 in Willow Springs
I-294 on the Hickory Hills–Bridgeview city line
US 41 in Chicago. The highways travel concurrently to northwest of Whiting, Indiana.
Indiana
I-90 northwest of Whiting
US 20 on the Hammond–Gary city line. The highways travel concurrently into Gary proper.
I-65 in Gary
I-90 in Gary
Michigan
I-94 in New Buffalo Township
US 31 in Bertrand Township
US 131 in White Pigeon
I-69 in Coldwater
US 127 in Woodstock Township
US 23 in Pittsfield Charter Township
I-94 in Ypsilanti Township. The highways travel concurrently through the township, passing through Ypsilanti.
I-275 in Canton
US 24 in Dearborn
I-94 in Dearborn
Cass Avenue in Detroit

== See also ==
- List of United States Numbered Highways
- U.S. Route 410
- Special routes of U.S. Route 12
