= Glade Creek =

Glade Creek may refer to:

- Glade Creek (Georgia), a stream in the US state of Georgia
- Glade Creek (Idaho), a stream in Idaho
- Glade Creek (Manns Creek), a tributary of Manns Creek, in its turn a New River tributary, in Fayette County, West Virginia
  - Glade Creek Grist Mill in Babcock State Park is on this stream
- Glade Creek (New River), a major tributary of the New River in Raleigh County, West Virginia
  - Phil G. McDonald Memorial Bridge, also known as the Glade Creek Bridge, a bridge on this river
- Glade Creek Township, Alleghany County, North Carolina, one of seven townships in Alleghany County, North Carolina, United States
