= Lewiston Dam =

Lewiston Dam may refer to:

- Lewiston Dam (California), on the Trinity River
- Lewiston Dam (Idaho), on the Clearwater River, a removed dam in Idaho
