= Lolo Pass (Idaho–Montana) =

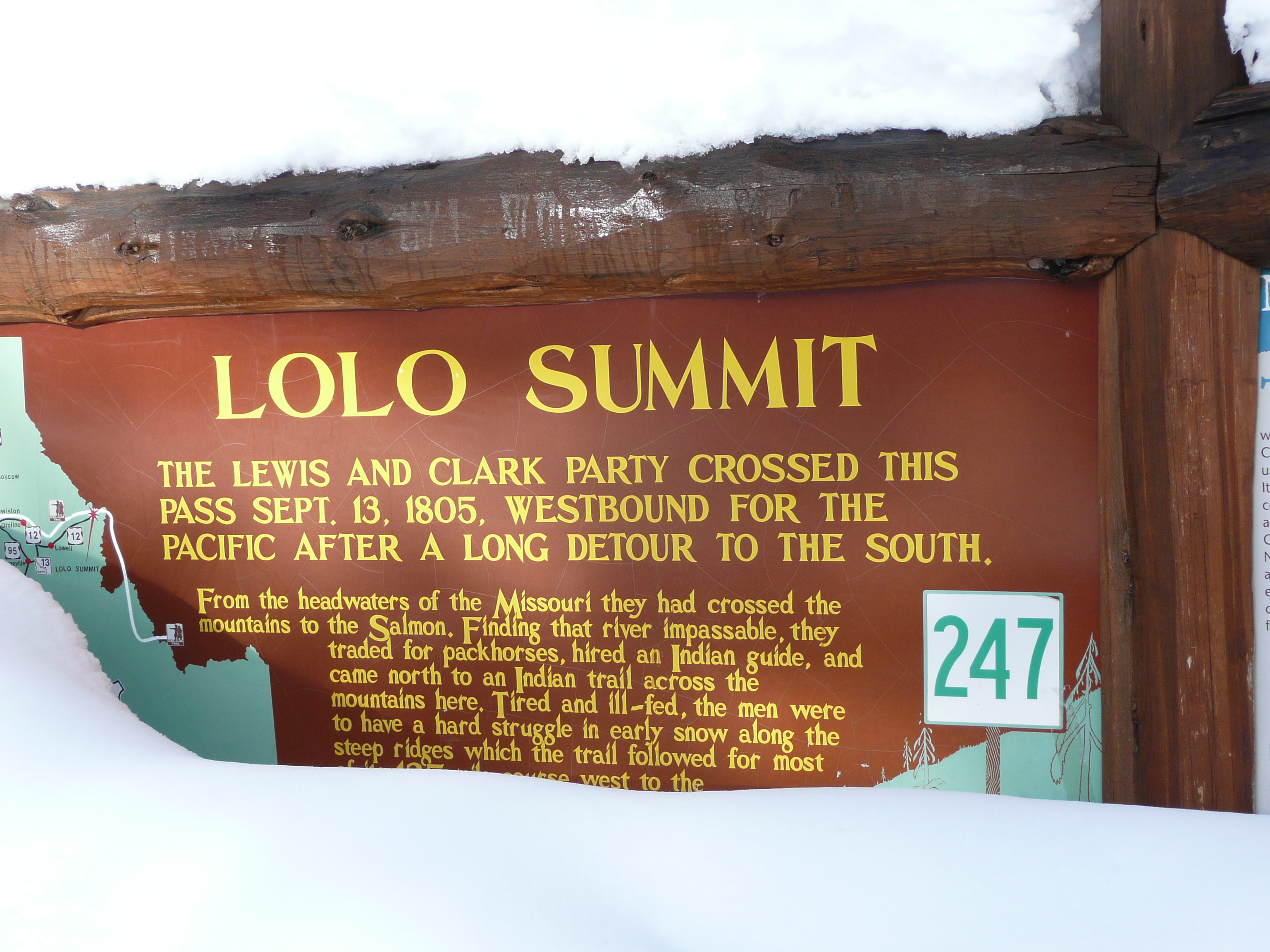
- Historical marker sign in Idaho in 2011

- Location within the United States Location within Idaho
- Elevation: 5,233 ft (1,595 m)
- Traversed by: US 12

Third Approach
- Location: Idaho County, Idaho, / Missoula County, Montana, U.S.
- Range: Bitterroot Range, Rocky Mountains
- Coordinates: 46.635°N 114.580°W

- Lolo Trail
- U.S. National Register of Historic Places
- U.S. National Historic Landmark
- Location: Bitterroot Mountains, Idaho-Montana
- Coordinates: 46.635°N 114.580°W
- Built: 1805
- NRHP reference No.: 66000309
- Added to NRHP: October 15, 1966

Lolo Pass, elevation 5,233 feet (1,595 m), is a mountain pass in the western United States, in the Bitterroot Range of the northern Rocky Mountains. It is on the border between the states of Montana and Idaho, approximately forty miles (65 km) west-southwest of Missoula, Montana.

The pass is the highest point of the historic Lolo Trail, between the Bitterroot Valley in Montana and the Weippe Prairie in Idaho. The trail, known as naptnišaqs, or "Nez Perce Trail" in Salish, was used by Nez Perce in the 18th century, and by the Lewis and Clark Expedition, guided by Old Toby of the Shoshone, on their westward snowbound journey in September 1805. After a winter at Fort Clatsop in present-day northwestern Oregon, the Corps of Discovery returned the following June. The Lolo Trail is a National Historic Landmark, designated for its importance to the Lewis and Clark Expedition, and its role in the 1877 Nez Perce War.

The name of the pass is sometimes said to have been Salish version of the French name Laurence or Laurent, but was probably a regular French nickname. The name Lolo was not used by Lewis and Clark. Its first known mention is in the 1810 journal of David Thompson, who described three fur trappers, probably of French descent, named Michael, Lolo, and Gregoire.

The pass was also used in 1877 during the Nez Perce War as some of the Nez Perce under Chief Joseph tried to escape the U.S. Army. Shortly after crossing the pass, the two sides clashed at the Battle of the Big Hole in Montana.

U.S. Highway 12, belatedly completed in 1962, crosses the pass. At the August dedication ceremony at Lolo Pass attended by thousands, the states' governors, Bob Smylie of Idaho and Tim Babcock of Montana, cut through a ceremonial cedar log with a two-man crosscut saw.

Lolo Hot Springs is seven miles (11 km) east of the pass in Montana. The first limited services in Idaho are in Powell, thirteen miles (21 km) to the west of the pass, then another 65 miles (105 km) to Lowell, at the confluence of the Lochsa and Selway Rivers to form the Middle Fork of the Clearwater. The primary city in Idaho served by U.S. 12 is Lewiston, 170 miles (270 km) west of the pass at the border with Washington, where the Clearwater meets the Snake.

On March 1, 2014, the Idaho Department of Fish and Game announced that 23 wolves had been killed in the Lolo Pass area, in order to boost elk populations.

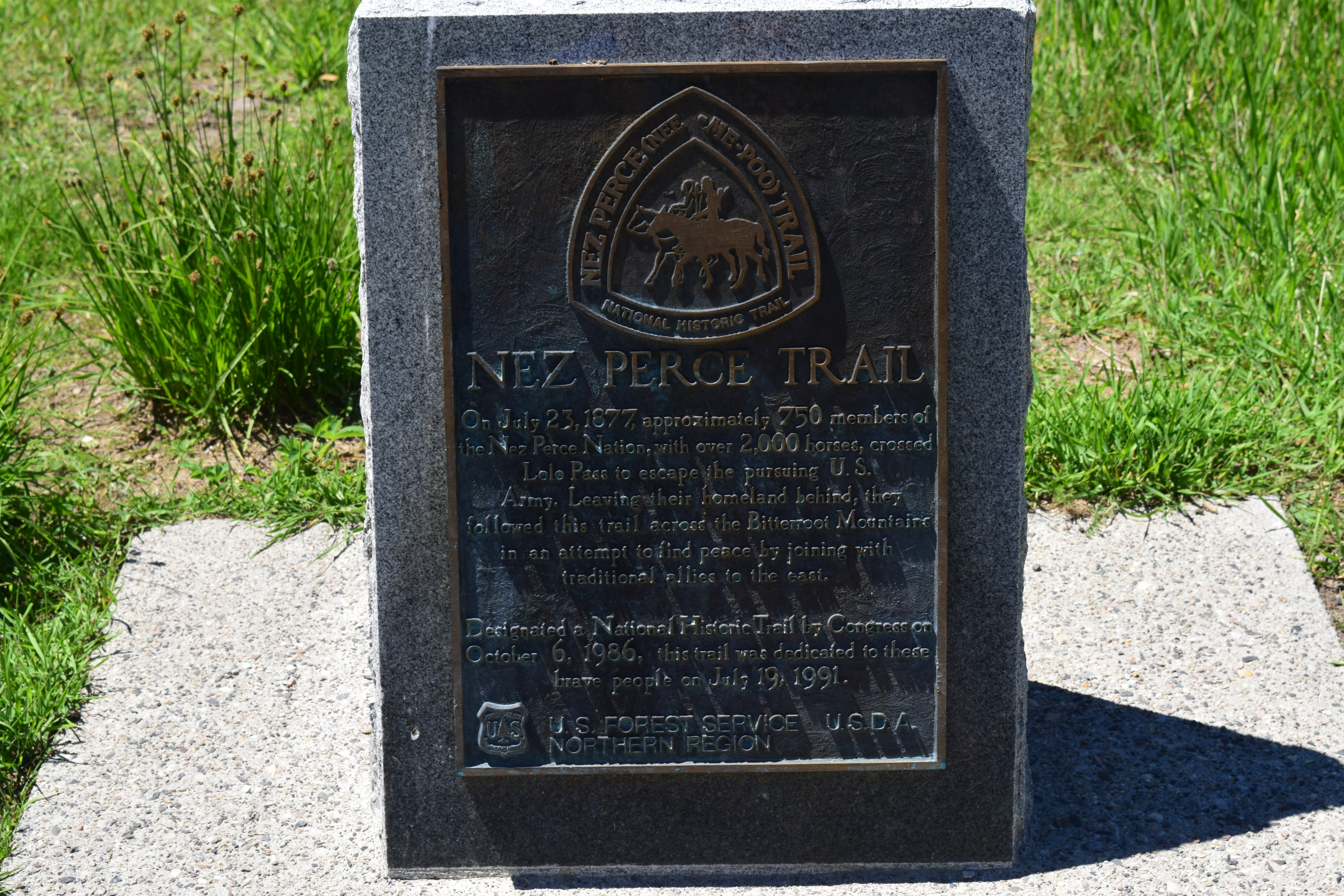
Nez Perce Trail Historical Marker, Lolo Pass 2017

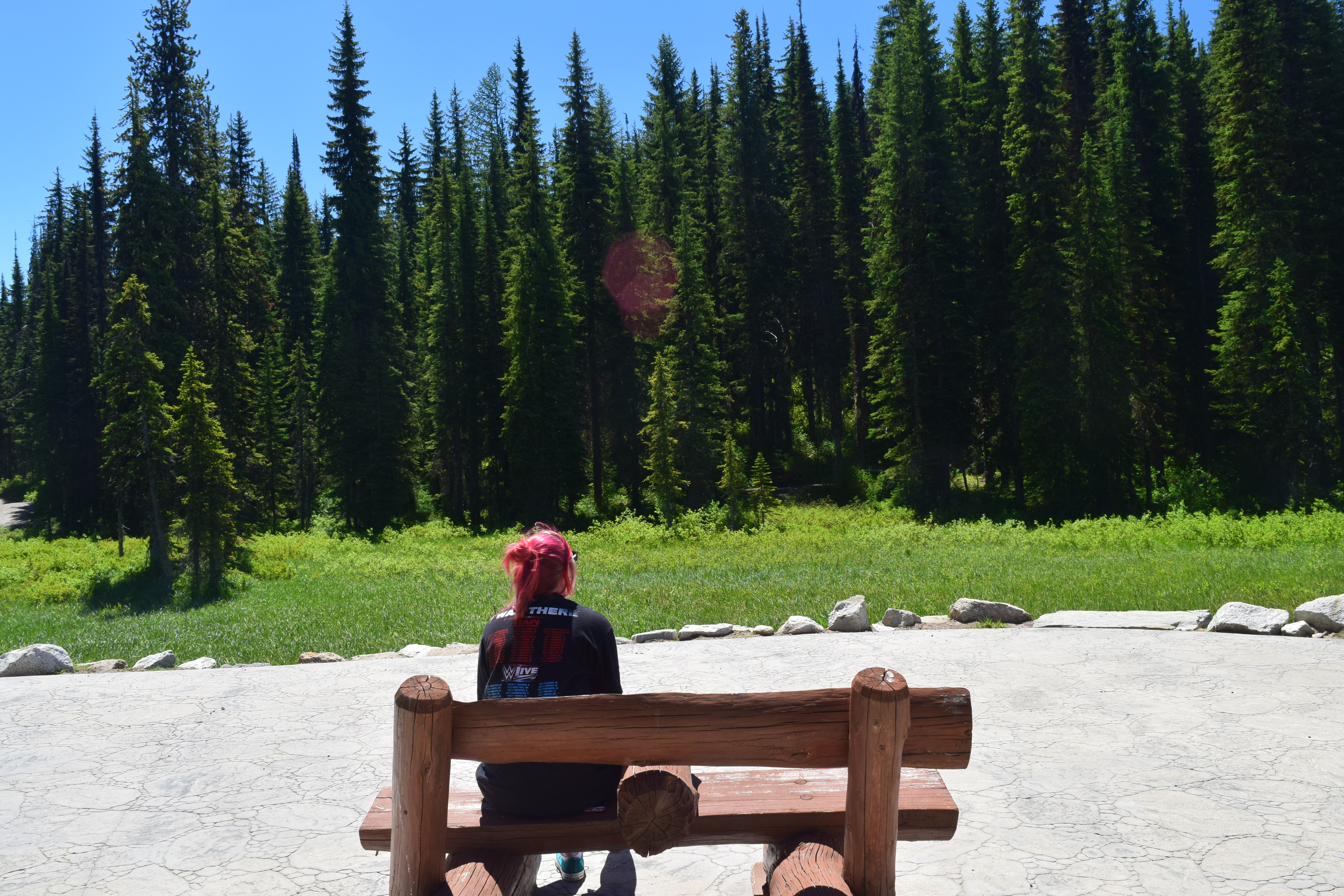
Lolo Pass walking trail 2017

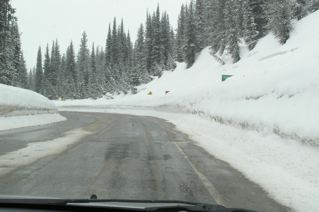
Lolo Pass, Montana side, approaching summit, westbound

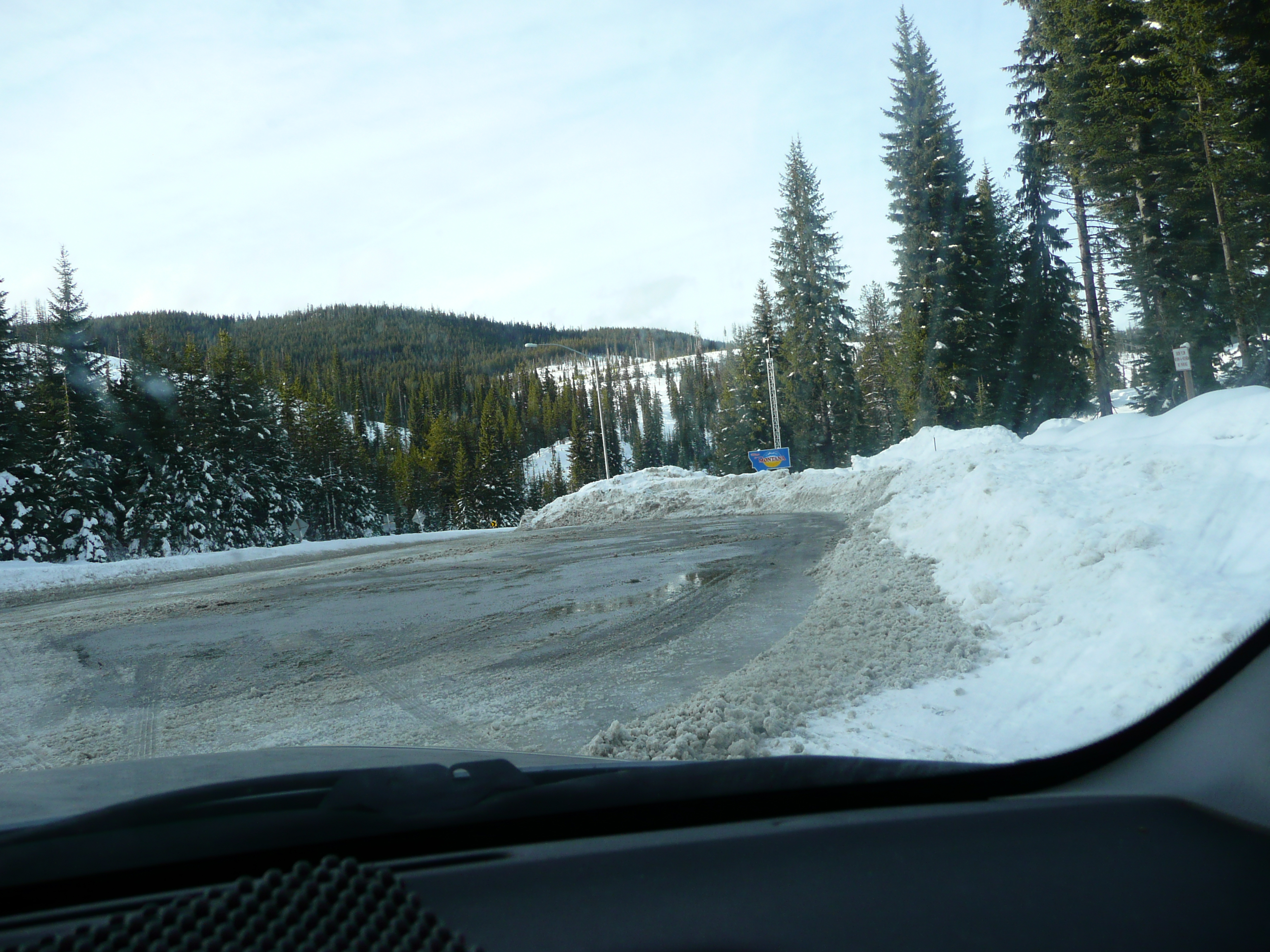
Entering Montana from Lolo Pass

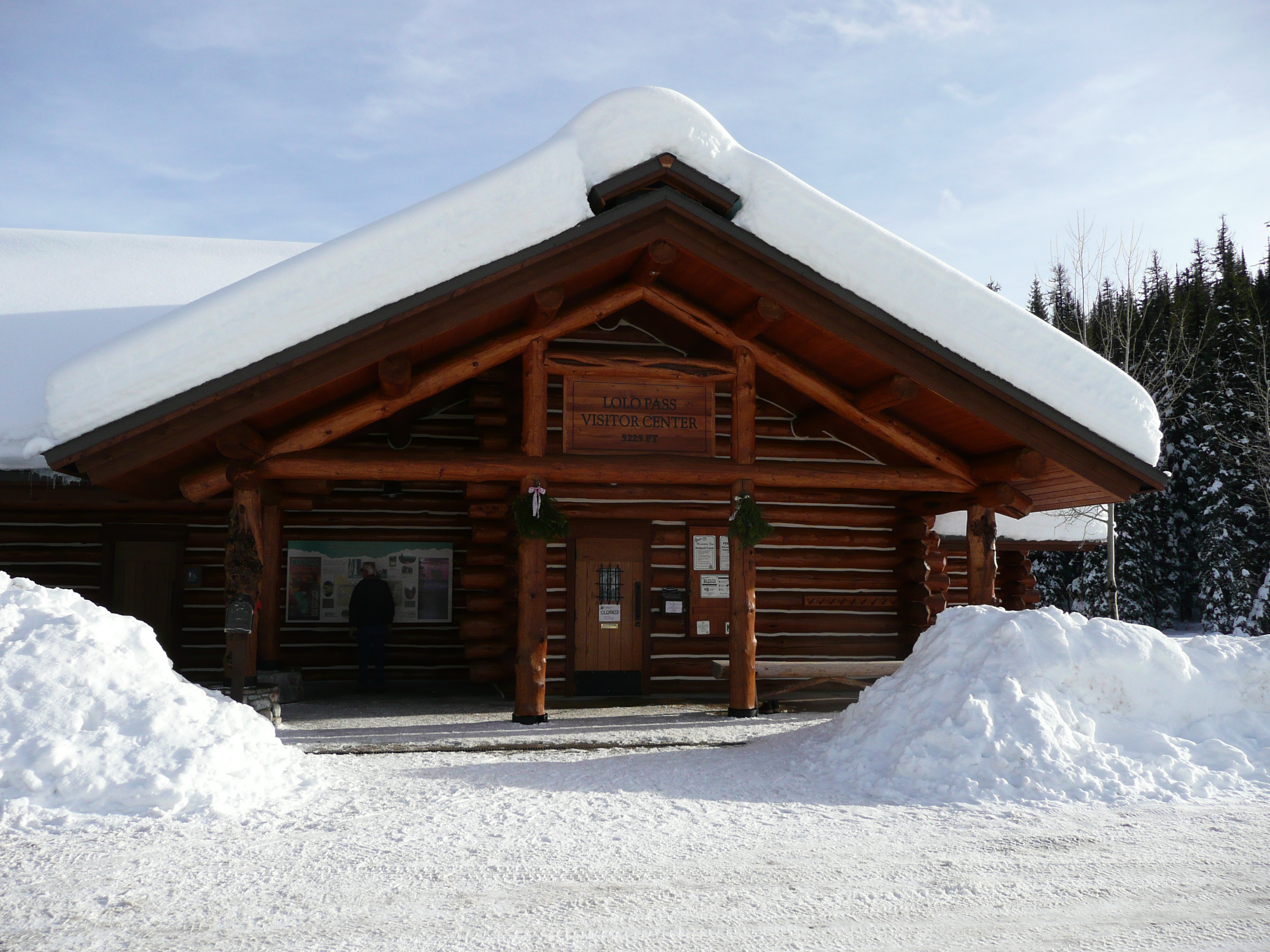
Lolo Pass visitor center

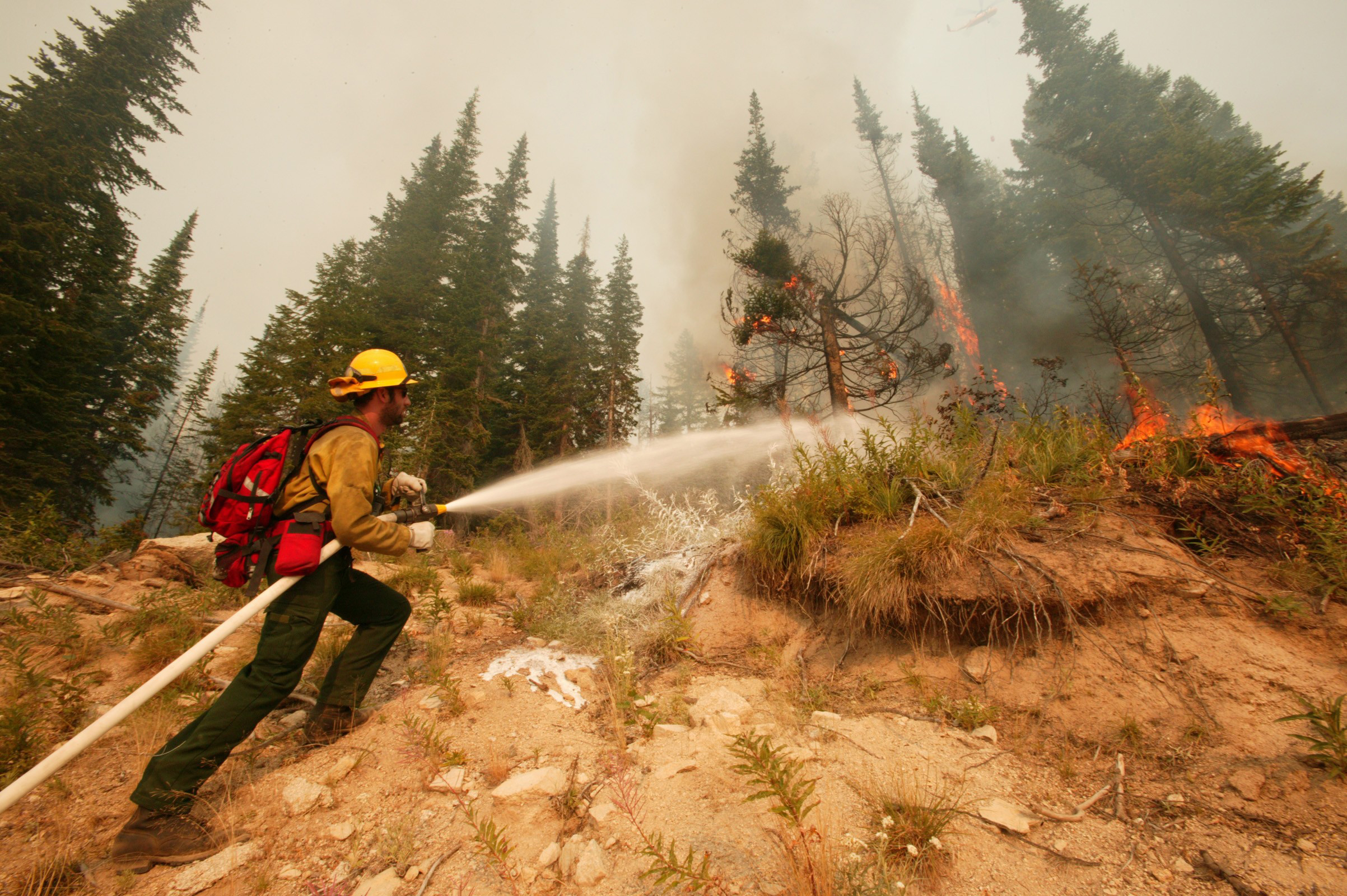
Forest fire near Lolo Pass, 2003

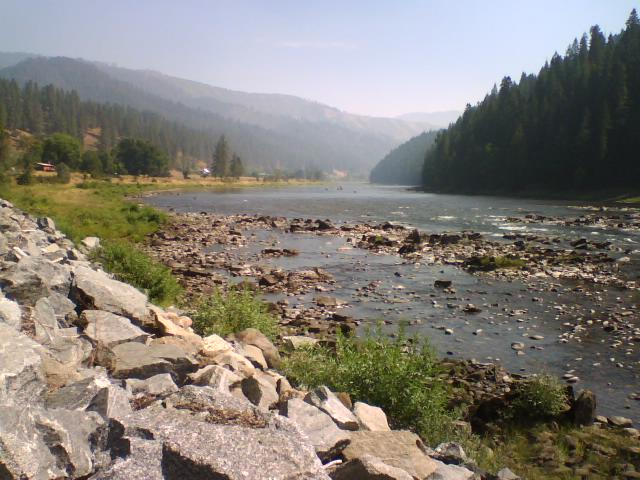
Idaho's Lochsa River, west of Lolo Pass

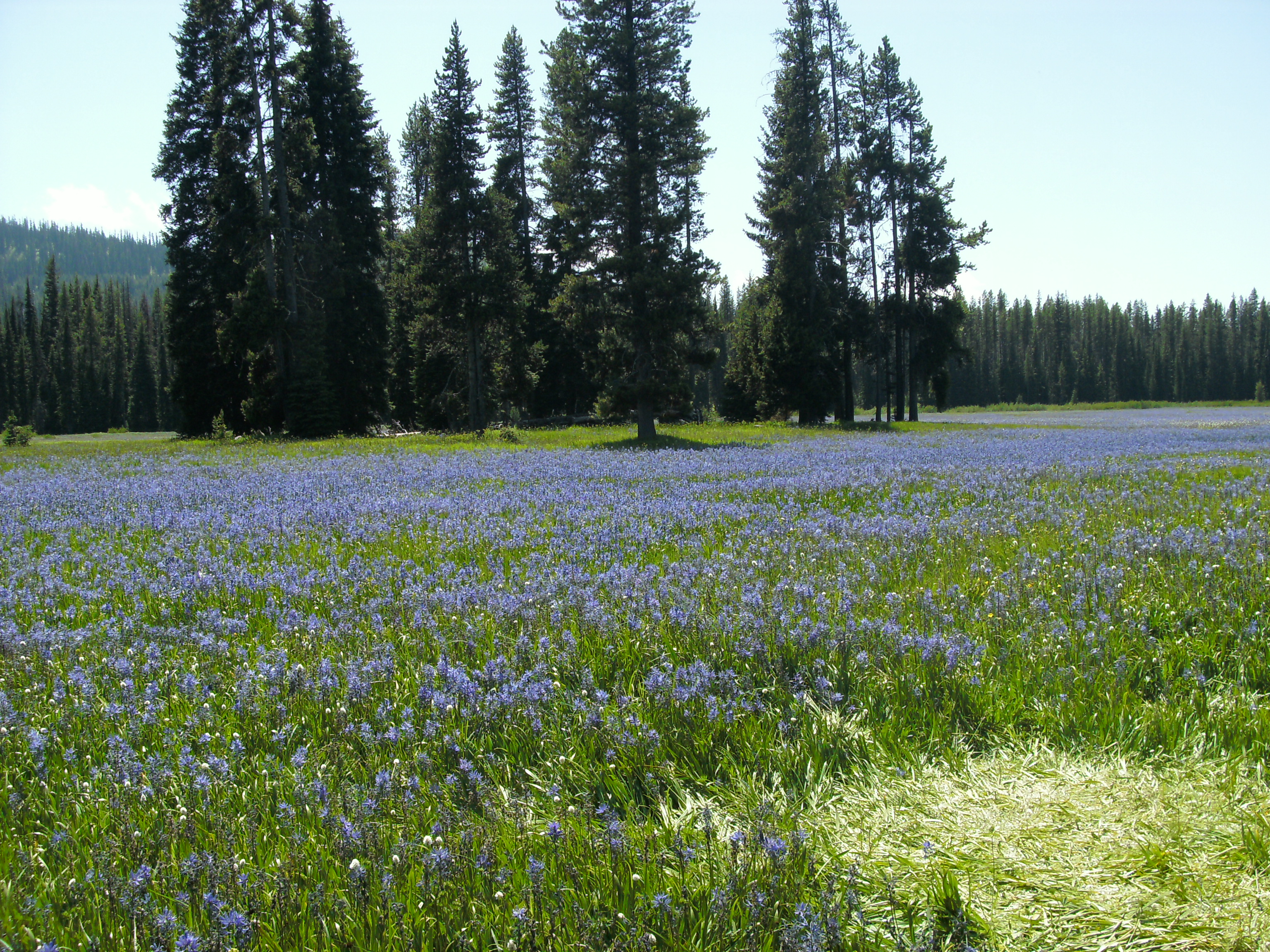
Camas blooming at Packer Meadows, near Lolo Pass, Idaho

== See also ==
- List of National Historic Landmarks in Idaho
- National Register of Historic Places listings in Idaho County, Idaho
- National Register of Historic Places listings in Missoula County, Montana
