= Middle Fork Clearwater River =

River in Idaho County, Idaho, United States

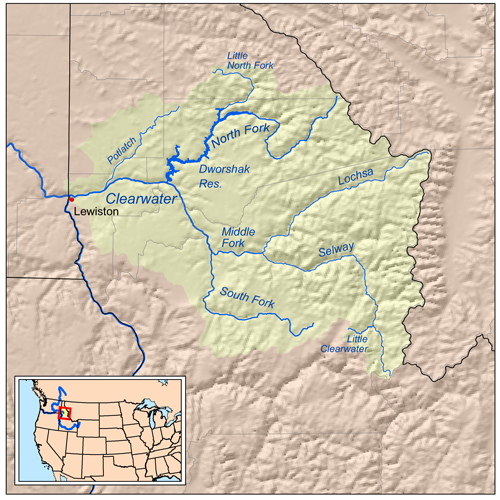
- Map of the Clearwater River watershed, including the Middle Fork

Location
- Country: United States
- State: Idaho

Physical characteristics
- Source: Confluence of Lochsa River and Selway River
  - location: Lowell, Idaho
  - coordinates: 46°08′25″N 115°35′58″W
- Mouth: Clearwater River
  - location: Kooskia, Idaho
  - coordinates: 46°08′44″N 115°58′57″W
  - elevation: 1,224 ft (373 m)
- Length: 23 mi (37 km)
- Basin size: 3,420 sq mi (8,900 km^{2})
- Discharge
  - location: Lowell (Note: There is no USGS stream gage in the Middle Fork proper, so the figure is the combination of gage #13336500 on the Selway River and gage #13337000 on the Lochsa River)
  - average: 6,532 cu ft/s (185.0 m^{3}/s) (Note: There is no USGS stream gage in the Middle Fork proper, so the figure is the combination of gage #13336500 on the Selway River and gage #13337000 on the Lochsa River)
  - minimum: 260 cu ft/s (7.4 m^{3}/s)
  - maximum: 77,200 cu ft/s (2,190 m^{3}/s)

Basin features
- Tributaries
  - left: Selway River, Clear Creek
  - right: Lochsa River, Pete King Creek, Maggie Creek

National Wild and Scenic River
- Type: Recreational
- Designated: October 2, 1968

The Middle Fork Clearwater River is a short, but high volume river in Idaho County, Idaho, United States and is the major source of the Clearwater River, a tributary of the Snake River.

== Description ==
The Middle Fork flows west for 23 miles (37 km) from the confluence of the Selway River and Lochsa River at Lowell, to the town of Kooskia where it joins with the South Fork Clearwater River to create the Clearwater River. The Middle Fork's entire length is within Idaho County, although a small portion of its watershed extends into Clearwater County.

The Middle Fork, along with the Selway and Lochsa Rivers, was among the original eight rivers designated as part of the National Wild and Scenic Rivers System. It is a major migration route for Pacific chinook salmon that spawn in the Selway River. Although the Middle Fork flows through a tight canyon, it is characterized by gentle Class I and II rapids suitable for floating, especially in late summer after the peak snow melt has decreased.

U.S. Route 12 follows the entire length of the river.

== See also ==
- List of rivers of Idaho
