= Selway–Bitterroot Wilderness =

Protected natural area in Idaho and Montana, United States

- IUCN category Ib (wilderness area)
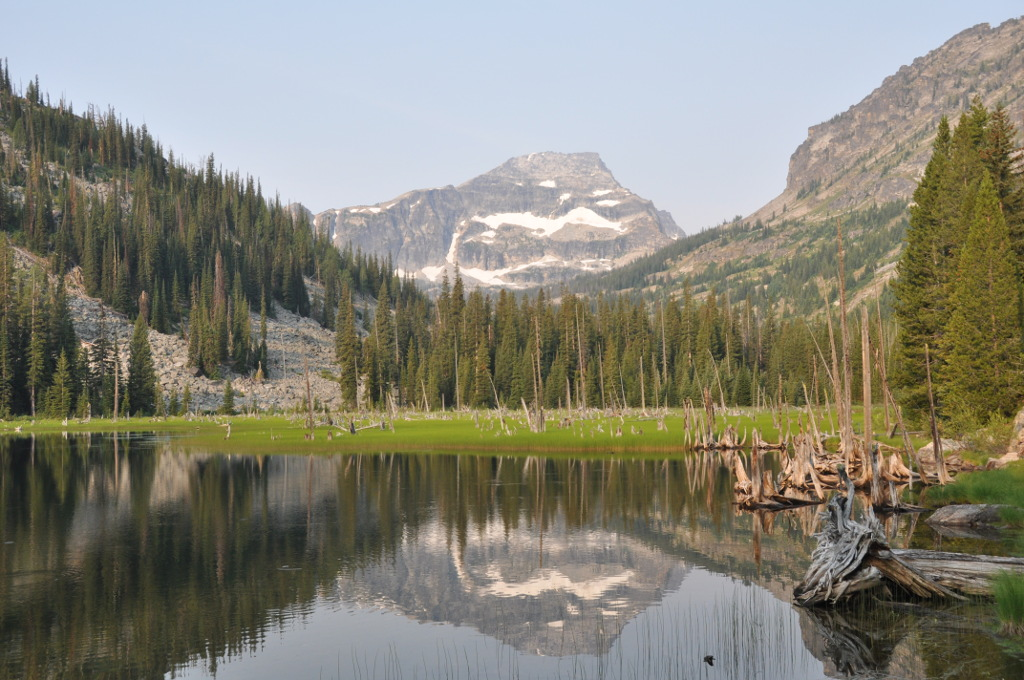
- Little Rock Creek Lake and El Capitan

- Location within the United States Location within Idaho
- Location: Idaho County, Idaho, Ravalli County, Montana, Missoula County, Montana, United States
- Nearest city: Darby, Montana
- Coordinates: 46°12′N 114°30′W
- Area: 1,340,460 acres (5,424.6 km^{2})
- Established: January 1, 1964
- Governing body: U.S. Forest Service

The Selway–Bitterroot Wilderness is a protected wilderness area in the states of Idaho and Montana, in the northwestern United States. At 1.3 million acres (5,300 km²), it is one of the largest designated wilderness areas in the United States (14th overall, but third-largest outside Alaska).

The Selway–Bitterroot Wilderness spans the Bitterroot Mountain Range, on the border between Idaho and Montana, and covers parts of Bitterroot National Forest, Clearwater National Forest, Lolo National Forest, and the Nez Perce National Forest. The Frank Church-River of No Return Wilderness Area is immediately to its south, separated from it only by a dirt road (the Magruder Corridor). Together with adjoining public land, the two wilderness areas form a five million-acre (20,000 km²) wild region.

It is here that the Lochsa and Selway rivers form and flow westward to their confluence at Lowell, Idaho (outside the wilderness along U.S. Route 12) to form the Middle Fork of the Clearwater River. The land ranges in elevation from 1,700 feet (520 m) on the Lochsa River to 10,157 feet (3,096 m) at Trapper Peak in the Bitterroot Mountains.

One of the largest elk herds in the United States calls the wilderness home, and it also boasts a healthy population of bighorn sheep. This wilderness is one of the areas being used to reintroduce wild packs of the grey wolf. The high-elevation areas around the Bitterroot peaks are rugged alpine parkland. Lower areas are covered by dense coniferous forest.

== See also ==
- List of U.S. Wilderness Areas
- North American inland temperate rainforest
