= Old Toby =

American explorer

Old Toby (died 1858), whose given name was Pikee Queenah ("Swooping Eagle"), was a war chief of the Tuziyammo (Big Lodge) band of Western Shoshone and a Shoshone dog soldier who helped guide the Lewis and Clark Expedition over the Continental Divide in 1805.

== Guide ==
Lewis and Clark first met Old Toby in August 1805 when they encountered Cameahwait's band of Shoshones living on the Lemhi River in what is now eastern Idaho. Old Toby was said to have traveled west of the Bitterroot Mountains previously and to know the best passes through which to cross them. He also knew how to reach a navigable river (the present-day Clearwater River) whose waters ultimately drained into the Columbia River. Lewis and Clark thus hired him to guide the expedition overland for their portage through the mountains and then accompany them downstream to the Columbia.

Old Toby guided the expedition for several weeks in the autumn of 1805, as did Tetoharsky and Twisted Hair. He guided Clark's exploration of the Salmon River and led the entire party from the Lemhi River valley at Salmon, Idaho, over the Bitterroot Mountains to the Bitterroot Valley, and then along the approximate route of the modern Lolo Trail to the Clearwater River country above Lewiston, Idaho.

When the expedition resumed paddling downstream in canoes and began encountering enormous whitewater rapids, Old Toby left the expedition and returned home, apparently without even being paid for his services. Nez Perce Indians relayed that he stole horses and returned home. He died of typhoid in 1858.

== Name ==
Thomas Rees' journal gives his name as "Tobe", an abbreviation of Tosa-tive koo-be, meaning "furnished white white-man brains", referring to his work as their guide. The expedition simply called him Toby, but the moniker "Old Toby" was added later in popular literature.

== Legacy ==
A monument was erected in his honor in the 1930s but demolished during construction of US Highway 93. In 2009, a new monument was erected in his honor in North Fork, Idaho, near Highway 93 and the Salmon River Road.
