= Stanley Hot Springs =

Thermal springs in Idaho

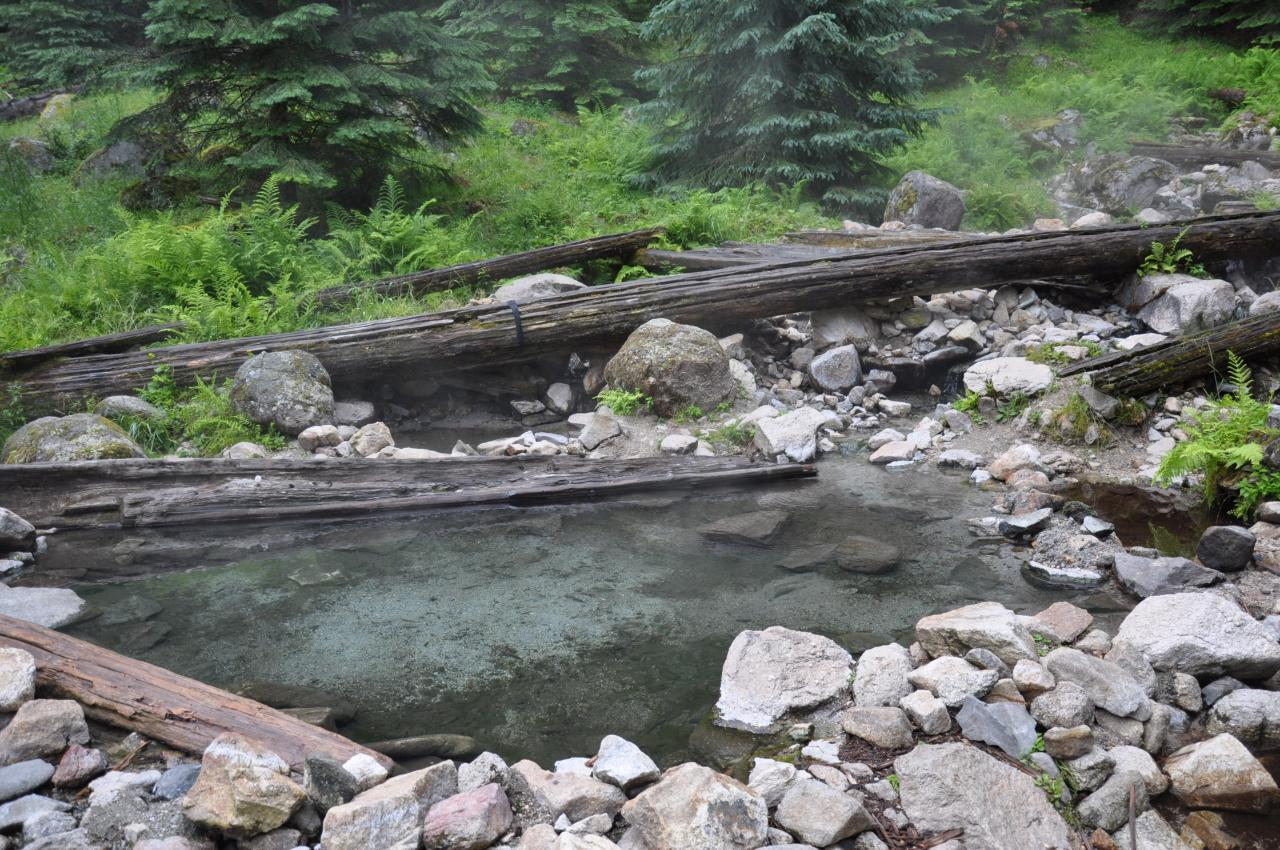
- Stanley Hot Springs, August 2008

- Location within Idaho Location within the United States
- Interactive map of Stanley Hot Springs
- Location: Selway-Bitterroot Wilderness; Idaho County, Idaho; United States.
- Coordinates: 46°18′59″N 115°15′31″W
- Elevation: 3,583 feet (1,092 m)
- Type: Geothermal spring
- Temperature: 106 °F (41 °C)

Stanley Hot Springs is a series of thermal springs located in the Selway–Bitterroot Wilderness in Idaho County, Idaho, United States.

== Location ==
From Lewiston, Idaho, take U.S. Route 12 east toward Lolo Pass. Once past the town of Lowell drive approximately 26 miles (42 km) to the Wilderness Gateway Campground. Trailhead parking is located past the 'A' and 'B' loops. There is no parking fee. Access to the hot springs is via Trail #211.

== Seasonal note ==
The bridge crossing Boulder Creek washed away in the winter of 1998–99. The USFS has not yet expressed intent to rebuild it. As of 2021, the hot springs are accessed as follows:

Ford the creek and head for the log jam, located a little downriver from the trail site. The logs are well stuck in place and make a bridge across the river. Follow the logs zig zagging across the river to the center island. There is a log with a rope strung into a makeshift bridge which can be used to cross over the last half of the creek.

The optimal times to visit are after the spring runoff and before heavy snowfall, although it is possible to snowshoe into the hot springs.

== Water profile ==
The geothermally heated water emerges at 106 °F / 41 °C.
