= List of dam removals in Idaho =

This is a list of dams in Idaho that have been removed as physical impediments to free-flowing rivers or streams.

== Removals by watershed ==
=== Clearwater River ===
The Grangeville Dam was a 440 ft (130 m) long arched concrete hydroelectric dam on the South Fork Clearwater River. The dam was removed in the interest of fish passage and since the hydropower facilities had become obsolete. It was destroyed by dynamite at 6:35 PM on August 19, 1963, following two prior detonations that day which had failed to collapse the structure. At the time, the dam was the largest ever to be removed, a record which stood for decades.

Built in 1927, the 45 ft (14 m) tall Lewiston Dam on the main Clearwater River was demolished in 1973 to make way for Lower Granite Lake, the slack water pool behind Lower Granite Dam.

== Completed removals ==
Dam	Height	Year removed	Location	Watercourse	Watershed
Cove Dam	26 ft (7.9 m)	2006	Grace; 42.532°N 111.796°W	Bear River	Bear River
Dip Creek Dam			Ketchum; 43.754°N 114.382°W	Dip Creek	Big Wood River
Lindernam Dam	26 ft (7.9 m)		Fremont County; 43.7622°N 116.46°W	Milk Creek	Boise River
Lewiston Dam	45 ft (14 m)	1973	Lewiston; 46.4335°N 116.959°W	Clearwater River	Clearwater River
Grangeville Dam (Harpster Dam)	56 ft (17 m)	1963	Idaho County; 45.9089°N 116.0080°W	South Fork Clearwater River	Clearwater River
Dutch Flat Dam	10 ft (3.0 m)	2013	Troy; 46.7428°N 116.785°W	West Fork Little Bear Creek	Clearwater River
Unnamed ford (Road 5440)		2009	Clearwater National Forest; 46.7633°N 115.087°W	Independence Creek	Clearwater River
Lane Dam			Boundary County; 48.6632°N 116.297°W	Elkhorn Gulch	Kootenai River
Timber Creek Dam		1970	Salmon–Challis National Forest; 44.5805°N 113.4665°W	Middle Fork Little Timber Creek	Lemhi River
Pancheri Diversion Dam		2010	Howe; 44.1194°N 113.247°W	Little Lost River	Little Lost River
High Plains Estates	16 ft (4.9 m)	2013	Eagle; 43.7691°N 116.4593°W	Tributary to Farmers Union Canal	Payette River
Browns Pond - Cruzen	25 ft (7.6 m)		McCall; 44.9144°N 115.9799°W	Lake Fork	Payette River
Malony Lake Dam		1986	Payette National Forest; 44.8753°N 115.9025°W	South Fork Lake Fork	Payette River
Colburn Mill Pond Dam	12 ft (3.7 m)	1999	Sandpoint; 48.4068°N 116.529°W	Colburn Creek	Pend Oreille River
Red Ives Dam	5 ft (1.5 m)	2021	Shoshone County; 47.0577°N 115.3421°W	Red Ives Creek	Saint Joe River
Buster Lake Dam	29 ft (8.8 m)		Challis; 44.4387°N 114.417°W	Garden Creek	Salmon River
Sunbeam Dam		1931	Sawtooth National Forest; 44.2706°N 114.7362°W	Salmon River	Salmon River
Kshmitter Dam		1988		Tributary to John Day Creek	Salmon River
Hoffman Duffy Dam	9.5 ft (2.9 m)	2014	Mountain Home; 43.1865°N 115.589°W	Tributary to Rattlesnake Creek	Snake River
Kunkel Dam		1994	Twin Falls; 42.2266°N 114.5241°W	Soldier Creek	Snake River
Watts Lake Dam			Nez Perce County; 43.9277°N 111.3859°W	Hatwai Creek	Teton River
Packsaddle Dam	40 ft (12 m)	1916	Tetonia; 43.7704°N 111.3394°W	North Fork Packsaddle Creek	Teton River
