= South Fork Clearwater River =

River in Idaho

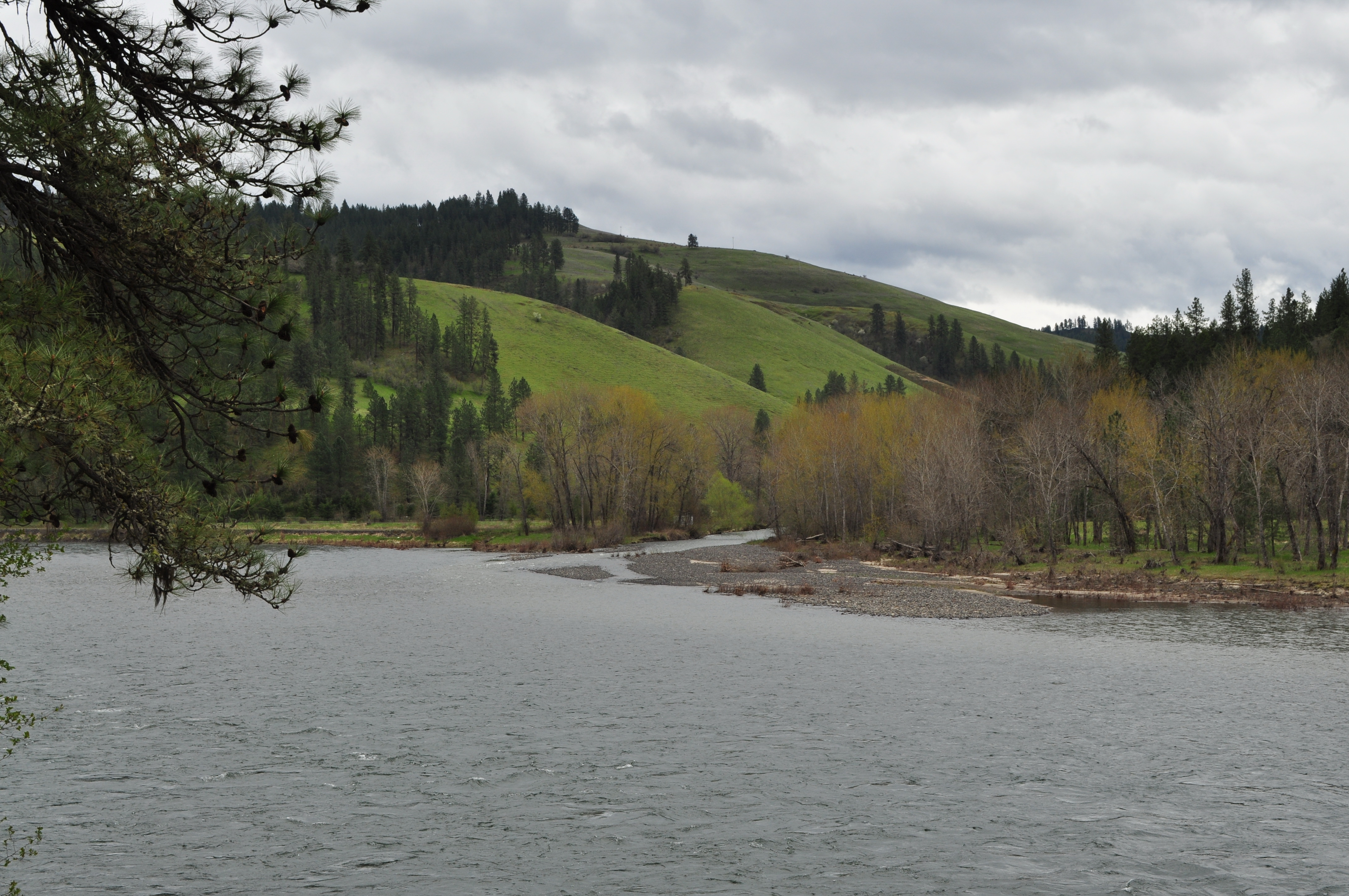
- The river at the Chief Looking Glass Village site near Kooskia

- Location of the mouth of the South Fork Clearwater River in Idaho South Fork Clearwater River (the United States)

Location
- Country: United States
- State: Idaho

Physical characteristics
- Source: Confluence of American and Red Rivers
  - location: Near Elk City, Nez Perce National Forest
  - coordinates: 45°48′30″N 115°28′29″W
  - elevation: 3,901 ft (1,189 m)
- Mouth: Clearwater River
  - location: Kooskia, Idaho County
  - coordinates: 46°08′45″N 115°58′57″W
  - elevation: 1,224 ft (373 m)
- Length: 62 mi (100 km)
- Basin size: 1,175 sq mi (3,040 km^{2})
- Discharge
  - location: Stites, about 4 mi (6.4 km) from the mouth
  - average: 998 cu ft/s (28.3 m^{3}/s)
  - minimum: 44 cu ft/s (1.2 m^{3}/s)
  - maximum: 13,800 cu ft/s (390 m^{3}/s)

Basin features
- Tributaries
  - left: Red River (Idaho), Crooked River (Idaho County)
  - right: American River (Idaho)

The South Fork Clearwater River is a 62-mile (100 km) long river in north-central Idaho in the United States. Draining about 1,175 square miles (3,040 km^{2}), the South Fork joins with the Middle Fork Clearwater River to form the Clearwater River, a major tributary of the Snake River.

The South Fork has been entirely free flowing since the demolition of the Grangeville Dam in 1963.

== Course ==
The river is formed by the confluence of the American River and Red River in the Nez Perce National Forest at an elevation of 3,901 ft (1,189 m). The roughly 20-mile (32 km) American River rises at 5,200 ft (1,600 m) and flows generally south to the confluence, while the northwest flowing Red River, rising at 6,100 ft (1,900 m), is about 25 mi (40 km) long. The American River is sometimes considered part of the main stem. From the confluence the South Fork flows west through a canyon followed by Idaho State Highway 14, receiving the Crooked River from the left and Newsome Creek from the right before reaching Golden, where it receives Tenmile Creek from the left. Further west the river receives Johns Creek from the left, Meadow Creek from the right and Mill Creek from the left, and the gorge deepens to a maximum of some 2,000 ft (610 m) as the river swings north near Grangeville. From there the river flows generally north, past Harpster and Stites, before reaching its mouth on the Clearwater at Kooskia, at an elevation of 1,224 ft (373 m).

Grangeville (Harpster) Dam was built on the South Fork in 1910 for hydroelectricity generation. In 1963, the dam was demolished,

== Grangeville Dam ==
The Grangeville Dam, alternatively called the Harpster Dam, was located on the South Fork Clearwater River 5 miles (8.0 km) east of Grangeville. The 56-foot-tall (17 m), 440-foot-long (130 m) arched concrete hydroelectric dam was constructed by the Grangeville Power and Light Company in 1910 and 1911 and acquired by the Washington Water Power Company in 1937. A wooden fish ladder had been installed but it collapsed in 1949. By the 1960s the dam's hydropower facilities had become obsolete. The decision was made to demolish the dam in the interest of fish passage, particularly that of Chinook salmon and steelhead trout.

The dam was destroyed by dynamite at 6:35 PM on August 19, 1963, following two prior detonations that day which had failed to collapse the structure. At the time, the dam was the largest ever to be removed, a record which stood for decades. Since the Grangeville Dam's demolition, the entire South Fork and its headwater tributaries have been free flowing and unobstructed by dams or major diversions.

In 1999, Avista Corporation (renamed from Washington Water Power Company) reached a $39 million settlement with the Nez Perce Tribe for fish losses caused by Grangeville Dam and Lewiston Dam.
