= Glade Creek (Idaho) =

Stream in Idaho, U.S.

Coordinates: 46°13′13″N 115°31′37″W

Glade Creek is a stream in the U.S. state of Idaho. It is a tributary of the Lochsa River.

Glade Creek was named from the numerous glades along its course.
