= Glade Creek (Georgia) =

- Location within Georgia Location within the United States

Physical characteristics
- Source
  - coordinates: 34.6031532°N 83.4098885°W
- Mouth
  - coordinates: 34.6314857°N 83.4971142°W

Glade Creek is a stream in the U.S. state of Georgia.

Glade Creek took its name from the Glade Mining Company, which maintained a presence in the area in the 1830s.
