= Selway River =

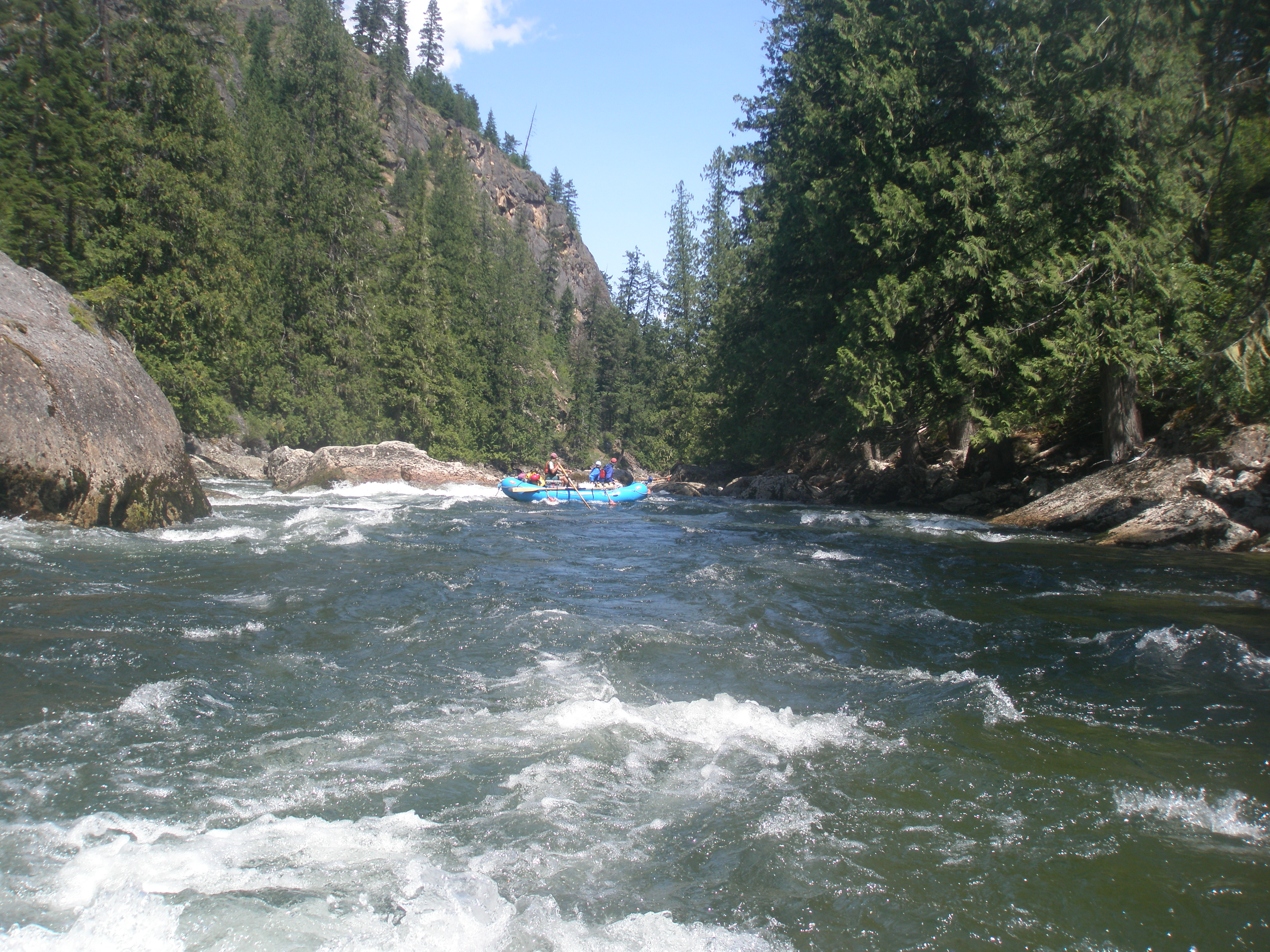
- Selway River at the Goat Creek rapid

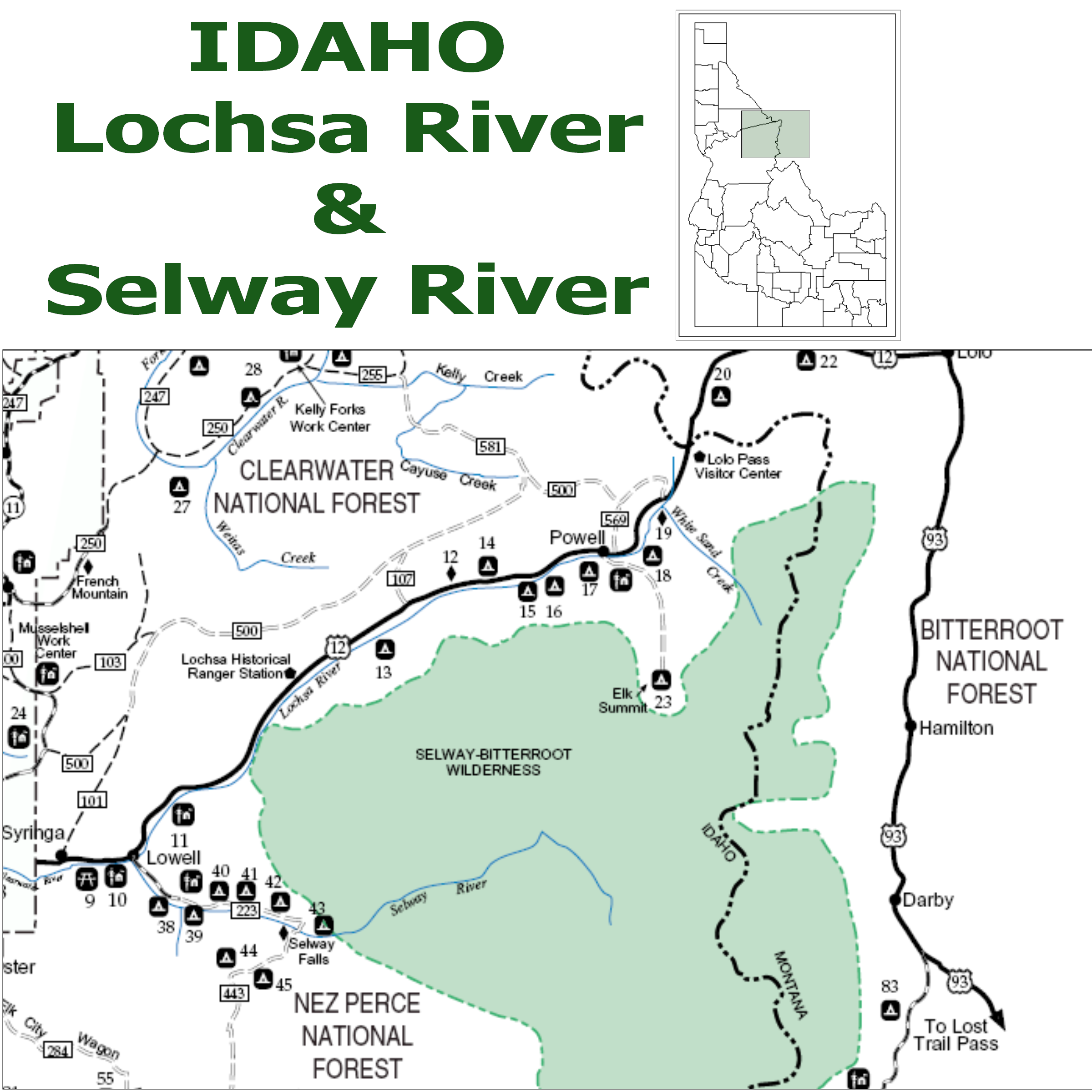
- Course of the river

- Location of the mouth of the Selway River in Idaho Selway River (the United States)

Location
- Country: United States
- State: Idaho
- County: Idaho

Physical characteristics
- Source: Southeast of Stripe Mountain
  - location: Bitterroot National Forest, Selway-Bitterroot Wilderness, Bitterroot Mountains
  - coordinates: 45°29′49″N 114°44′37″W
  - elevation: 6,857 ft (2,090 m)
- Mouth: Meets Lochsa River to form Middle Fork Clearwater River
  - location: Lowell, Nez Perce National Forest
  - coordinates: 46°08′25″N 115°35′58″W
  - elevation: 1,453 ft (443 m)
- Length: 100 mi (160 km)
- Basin size: 2,013 sq mi (5,210 km^{2})
- Discharge
  - location: Lowell, Idaho
  - average: 3,773 cuft/s
  - minimum: 580 cuft/s
  - maximum: 29 573 cuft/s

National Wild and Scenic River
- Type: Wild, Recreational
- Designated: October 2, 1968
- Reference no.: P.L. 90-542

The Selway River is a large tributary of the Middle Fork of the Clearwater River in the U.S. state of Idaho. It flows within the Selway-Bitterroot Wilderness, the Bitterroot National Forest, and the Nez Perce National Forest of North Central Idaho. The entire length of the Selway was included by the United States Congress in 1968 as part of the National Wild and Scenic Rivers Act.

The main stem of the Selway is 100 miles (160 km) in length from the headwaters in the Bitterroots to the confluence with the Lochsa near Lowell to form the Middle Fork of the Clearwater. The Selway River drains a 2,013-square-mile (5,210 km^{2}) basin in Idaho County.

== History ==
The Selway River is home to Chinook salmon. Four salmon channels were built "in the mid-1960s by the Idaho Department of Fish and Game and by the Job Corps ... along the Selway to help re-establish the spring chinook run after hydroelectric dams were built downstream." The river was stocked with salmon eggs and fry "each fall through 1981, and again in 1985." A 1993 book about the project, Indian Creek Chronicles, won the Pacific Northwest Booksellers Association Book Award.

== Flora ==
- Cedar - Western red cedar
- ferns
- Firs – Douglas and grand fir
- Huckleberries
- Pine - ponderosa pine
- Spruce - Engelmann spruce

== Wildlife ==
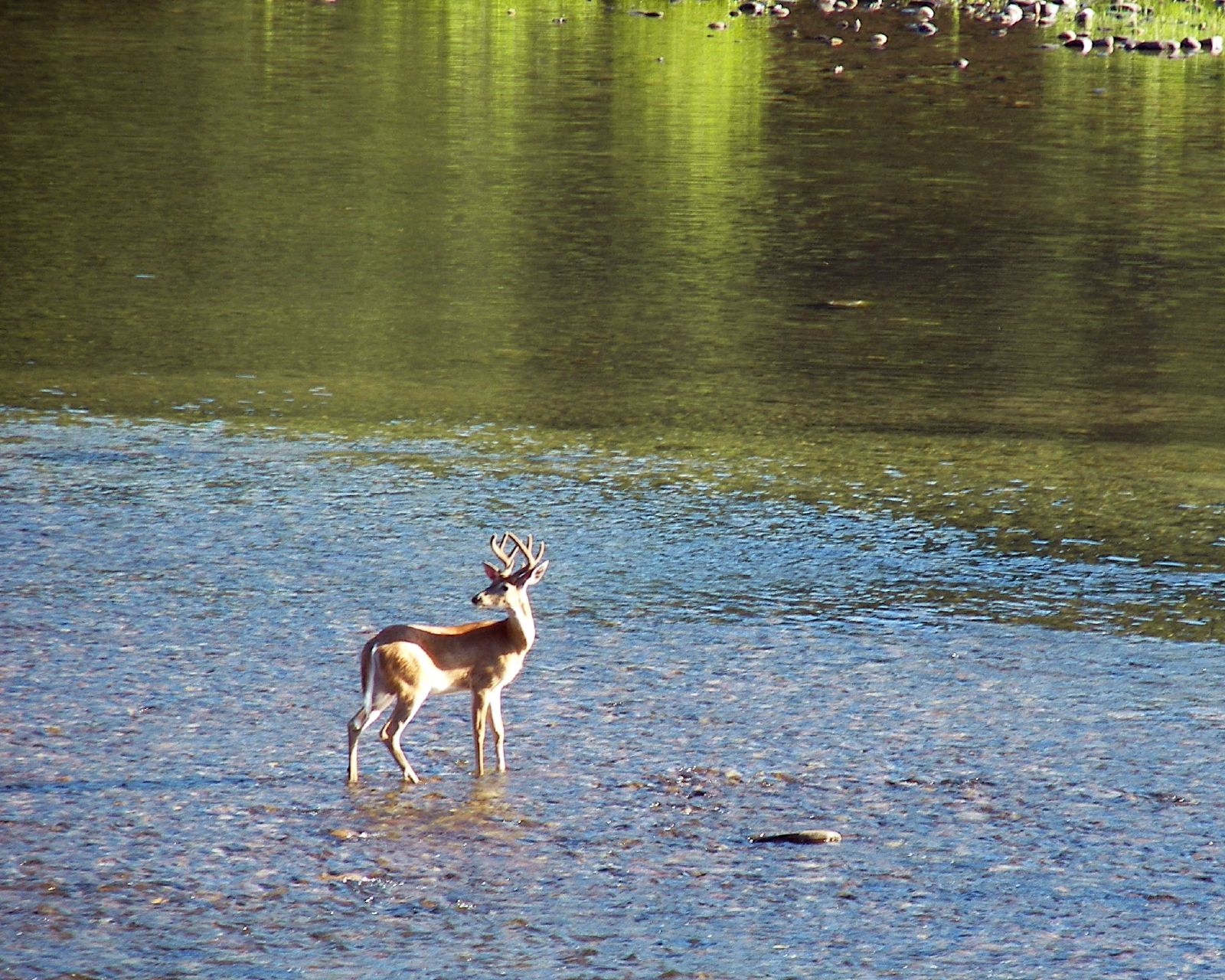
White-tail deer in the Selway River

- Birds
  - Bald eagle
  - Grouse
  - Heron
  - Osprey
  - Owls
  - Wild turkey
- Fish
  - Trout
    - bullhead
    - bull
    - rainbow or steelhead
    - westslope cutthroat
  - Salmon
    - Chinook
    - coho
  - Mountain whitefish
- Mammals
  - Bighorn sheep
  - American black bear
  - Cougar
  - Elk
  - Fisher
  - Gray wolf
  - Lynx
  - Moose
  - Mountain goat
  - Mule deer
  - Northern river otter
  - Skunk
  - Weasel
  - White-tailed deer
  - Wolverine

== Recreation ==
- Backcountry skiing
- Camping
- Fly fishing – Limits and catch-and-release
- Hiking
- Whitewater rafting – permits required
- Hunting

== See also ==
- List of rivers of Idaho
- List of longest streams of Idaho
- List of National Wild and Scenic Rivers

== Bibliography ==
- Floating the Wild Selway. (1991) [Missoula, Mont.?] : U.S. Dept. of Agriculture, Forest Service, Northern Region.
- Selway River Corridor: A Guide to Recreation on the Moose Creek Ranger District. (2000) Kooskia, Idaho : U.S. Dept. of Agriculture, Forest Service, Nez Perce National Forest, Moose Creek Ranger Station.
- Selway River fisheries investigations : job completion report. (1979) [Idaho] : Idaho Dept. of Fish & Game.
- A survey and evaluation of archaeological resources in the Magruder Corridor, Bitterroot National Forest, east-central Idaho, 1969. (1969) Pocatello, Idaho : Idaho State University Museum.
