= Lochsa River =

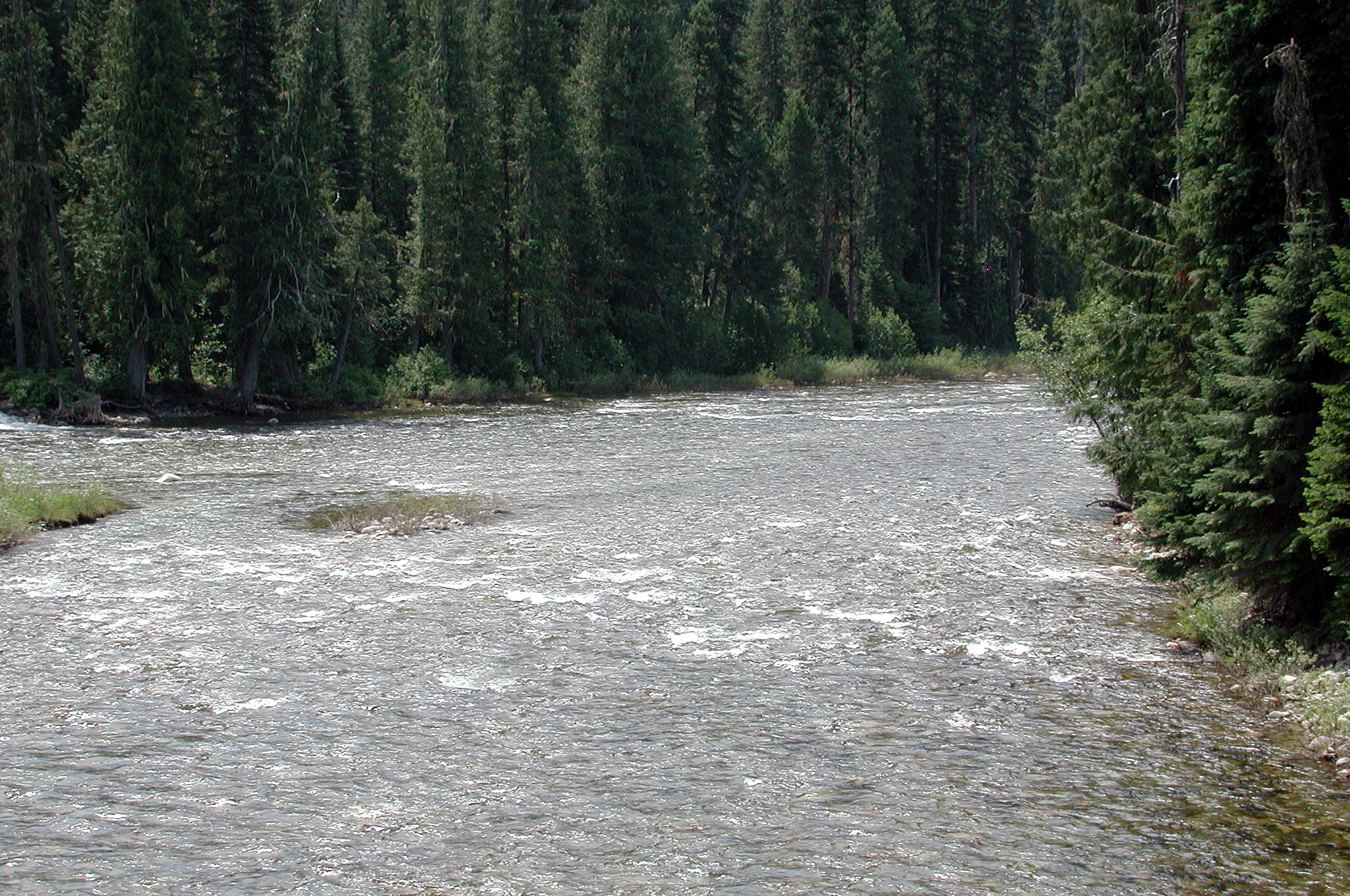
- Headwaters near Powell in 2008

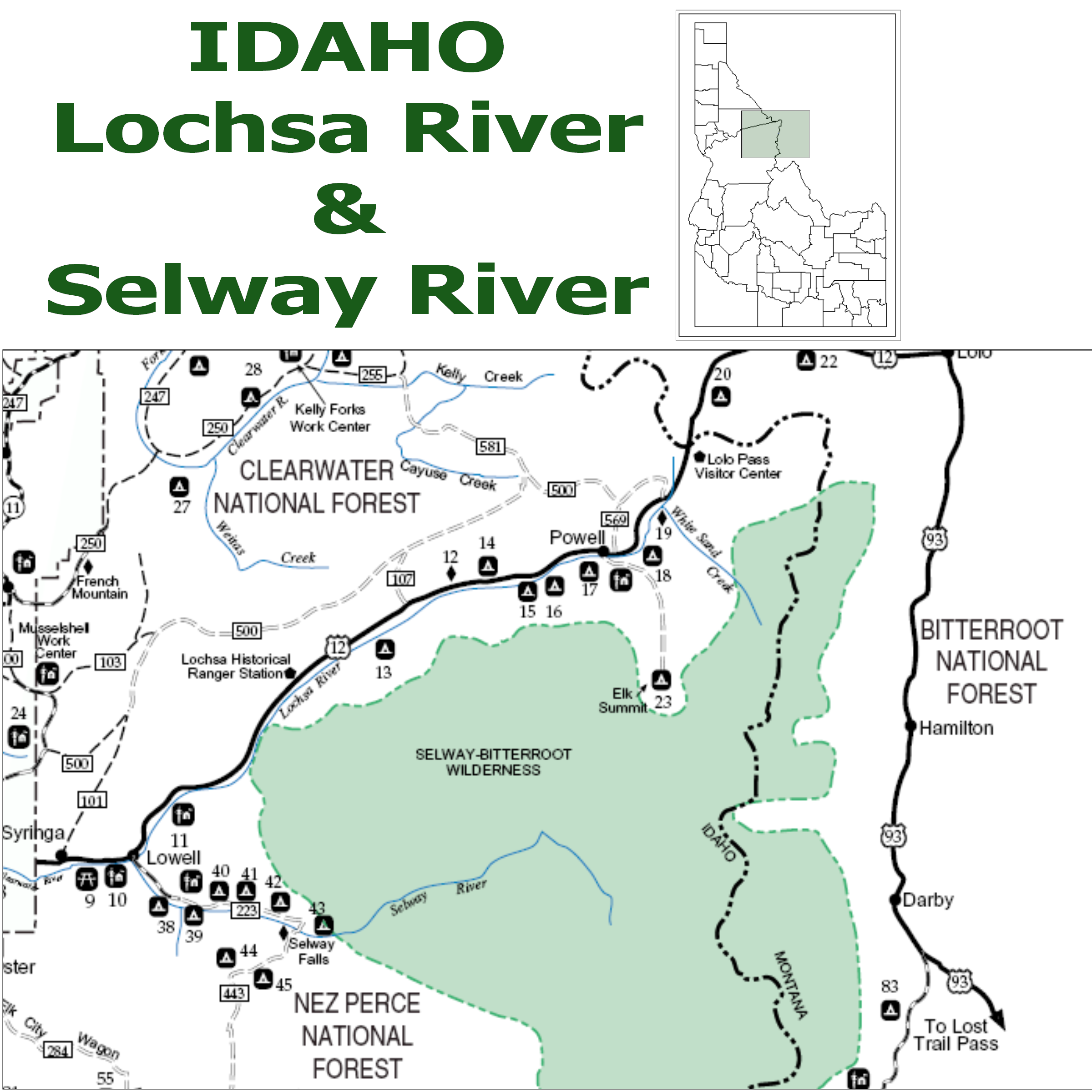
- Lochsa and Selway rivers

- Location of the mouth of the Lochsa River in Idaho Lochsa River (the United States)
- Etymology: Nez Perce word for "rough water"

Location
- Country: United States of America
- State: Idaho
- County: Idaho

Physical characteristics
- Source: Confluence of Crooked Fork and Colt Killed Creek, Bitterroot Mountains
  - location: Near Powell Ranger Station, Idaho County, Idaho
  - coordinates: 46°30′30″N 114°40′54″W
  - elevation: 3,441 ft (1,049 m)
- Mouth: Clearwater River
  - location: Lowell, Idaho County, Idaho
  - coordinates: 46°08′25″N 115°35′58″W
  - elevation: 1,453 ft (443 m)
- Length: 70.1 mi (112.8 km)
- Basin size: 1,180 sq mi (3,100 km^{2})
- Discharge
  - location: Lowell, 0.9 miles (1.4 km) from mouth
  - average: 2,822 cu ft/s (79.9 m^{3}/s)
  - minimum: 100 cu ft/s (2.8 m^{3}/s)
  - maximum: 35,100 cu ft/s (990 m^{3}/s)

National Wild and Scenic River
- Type: Recreational
- Designated: October 2, 1968
- Reference no.: P.L. 90-542

The Lochsa River is in the northwestern United States, in the mountains of north central Idaho. It is one of two primary tributaries (with the Selway to the south) of the Middle Fork of the Clearwater River in the Clearwater National Forest. Lochsa is a Nez Perce word meaning rough water. The Salish name is Ep Smɫí, "It Has Salmon."

The Lochsa (pronounced "lock-saw") was included by the U.S. Congress in 1968 as part of the National Wild and Scenic Rivers Act. The Lochsa and Selway rivers and their tributaries have no dams, and their flow is unregulated. In late spring (mid-May to mid-June), the Lochsa River is rated as one of the world's best for continuous whitewater.

The main stem of the Lochsa is seventy miles (110 km) in length from its headwaters near Powell Ranger Station in the Bitterroots to Lowell, where the Lochsa joins the Selway River to form the Middle Fork of the Clearwater. Over this distance, the river drops nearly two thousand feet (600 m), from 3,441 feet (1,049 m) above sea level at Powell to 1,453 feet (443 m) at Lowell.

The drainage basin for the Lochsa River system covers 1,180 square miles (3,060 km^{2}) in Idaho County. The river is fed by the melting of the significant snowpack of the Bitterroot Range, among the highest precipitation areas in the state.

== Course ==
The Lochsa River begins at the confluence of Crooked Fork and Colt Killed Creek (also called White Sand Creek) near the Powell Ranger Station in northeastern Idaho and flows 70.1 miles (112.8 km) southwest to the village of Lowell. Running parallel to U.S. Route 12 for its entire length, the river winds through the Clearwater National Forest in the Bitterroot Mountains. Just below Lowell, the Lochsa and the Selway River join to form the Middle Fork Clearwater River.

At its point of formation just west of Elk Summit Road 360, the Lochsa receives a small tributary, Walton Creek, from the left. The creek flows through the Powell adult salmon trap before entering the river. Slightly downstream from the salmon station, the Lochsa passes White Sand Campground on the right. About 1.5 miles (2.4 km) later, it flows by the Powell Ranger Station and heliport and, shortly thereafter, Lochsa Lodge and Powell Campground, all on the right, and receives Cliff Creek and Jay Creek, both from the left.

Between 66 miles (106 km) and 65 miles (105 km) from the mouth, the Lochsa receives Imnamatnoon (Papoose) Creek from the right, then Robin Creek from the left, and passes Whitehouse Campground and Wendover Campground, both on the right, and receives Wendover Creek from the right. Cold Storage Creek enters from the right at about 64 miles (103 km) from the mouth. Eagle Creek enters from the left about 1 mile (1.6 km) later, and Badger Creek from the right 1 mile (1.6 km) further on. About 2 miles (3 km) down from Badger Creek the river receives Waw'aalamnine (Squaw) Creek from the right. Between 60 miles (97 km) and 50 miles (80 km) from the mouth, the river receives Doe Creek from the right, passes under the Jerry Johnson Pack Bridge, receives Burnt Creek from the right and Warm Springs Creek from the left; passes Jerry Johnson Campground on the right; receives Colgate Creek from the left and Mink Creek on the right; passes Colgate Warm Springs and the Colgate Licks on the right, and receives Bear Mountain Creek from the right, Post Office Creek from the right, Lake Creek from the left, and passes under Mocus Point Pack Bridge, in that order.

From about 48 miles (77 km) to 40 miles (64 km) from the mouth, the Lochsa passes Weir Creek Hot Springs and receives Weir Creek and Ginger Creek, both from the right, Mocus Creek from the left, and Ashpile Creek from the right, then Indian Meadows Creek from the left, Indian Grave Creek from the right, passes the White Pine Access Area on the right, receives Eagle Mountain Creek from the left, and passes under Eagle Mountain Pack Bridge, in that order. Over the next 10 miles (16 km), the river receives Skookum Creek from the right, Stanley Creek from the left, and Castle Creek from the right, passes Green Flat Campground and Nine Mile Rest Area, both on the right, receives Bald Mountain Creek from the right, and Dutch Creek and Hard Creek from the left. Just below 30 miles (48 km) from the mouth, the Lochsa receives Pass Creek from the right and over the next 10 miles (16 km) receives No-See-Um Creek, Dipper Creek, and Sherman Creek, all from the right, then Lone Knob Creek from the left, passes Wilderness Gateway Campground on the left and Boulder Flat on the right, receives Boulder Creek from the left, passes the Lochsa Work Center on the right; receives Sardine Creek, Fish Creek, Bee Creek, Eel Creek, and Otter Slide Creek, all from the right, then passes Beaver Flat on the right and receives Big Stew Creek from the left and Snowshoe Creek from the right.

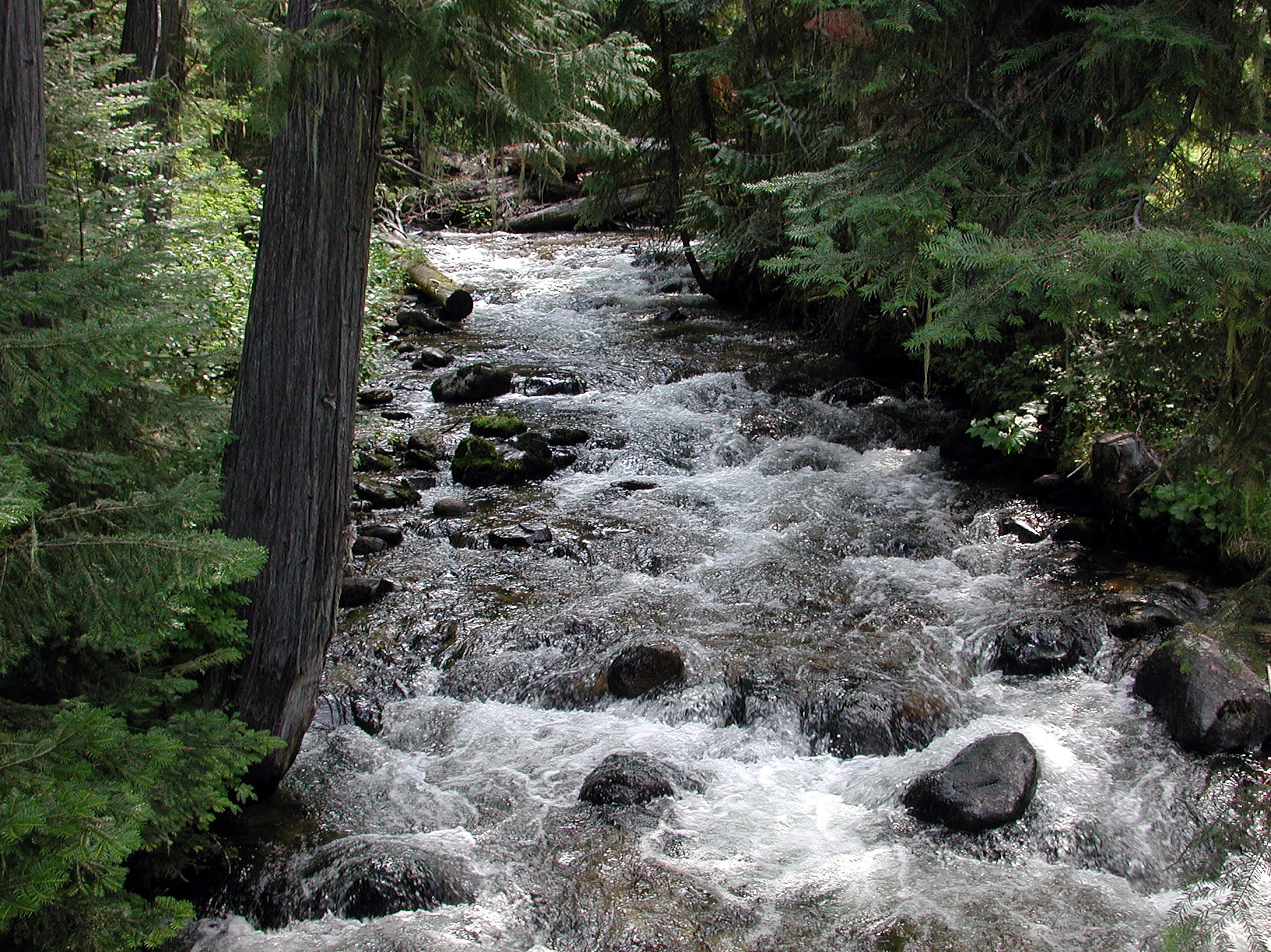
Walton Creek is the uppermost tributary of the Lochsa River. It flows through the Powell adult salmon trap before entering the river.

Between about 19 miles (31 km) and 10 miles (16 km) from the mouth, the Lochsa receives Macaroni Creek, Wild Horse Creek, and Tomcat Creek, all from the right, Old Man Creek from the left, Tumble Creek from the right, Split Creek from the left, passes under Split Creek Pack Bridge, receives Fire Creek from the left, Bimerick Creek and Tick Creek from the right, Coolwater Creek from the left, passes Knife Edge Campground and Major Fenn Picnic Area on the right, receives Stub Creek from the left, and Deadman Creek from the right, in that order. Over its last ten miles (16 km), the river passes Glade Creek Campground and receives Glade Creek, both on the right, passes Apgar Campground and receives Apgar Creek, both on the right, receives Chance Creek from the left, Canyon Creek from the right, Hellgate Creek and Handy Creek, both from the left, Rye Patch Creek from the right, Cat Creek and Kerr Creek, both from the left, Pete King Creek from the right, passes Icicle Spring on the right, receives Lowell Creek from the right, passes a United States Geological Survey (USGS) stream gage 0.9 miles (1.4 km) from the mouth, receives Lottie Creek from the left, passes the town of Lowell on the left, passes under the Lowell Bridge, and meets the Selway River.

Downstream from Lowell, the Middle Fork of the Clearwater River flows west, meets the South and North Forks, and enters the Snake River at Lewiston on the Idaho—Washington border, 98 miles (158 km) by river from Lowell. Below Lewiston, the Snake flows 140 miles (230 km) to its confluence with the Columbia River just south of the Tri-Cities. Over this stretch, four dams in Washington block the Snake. They are the Lower Granite Dam, Little Goose Dam, Lower Monumental Dam, and Ice Harbor Dam, in that order.

== History ==
Long before the arrival of European Americans in the 19th century, the Nez Perce people in Idaho used the trail along the Lochsa River to travel to the plains of Montana to hunt buffalo. Kootenai and Salish (Flatheads) from Montana used the river trail to reach salmon runs in the rivers and streams feeding into the Columbia basin.

During mid-September 1805, the explorers Lewis and Clark traveled westward along the Lolo Trail, descending into and out of the Lochsa Gorge, then above its north rim. They described the region near the modern-day ranger station at Powell as follows:

... the grass entirely eaten out by the horses, we proceeded on 2 miles & Encamped opposite a Small Island at the mouth of a branch on the right side of the river which is at this place 80 yards wide. Swift and Stoney, here we were compelled to kill a Colt for our men & Selves to eat for the want of meat & we named the South fork Colt killed Creek ... The Mountains which we passed to day much worst than yesterday the last excessively bad & thickly Strowed with falling timber & Pine Spruce fur Hackmatak & Tamerack, Steep and Stoney our men and horses much fatigued ...

They experienced significant early season snowfall and suffered near starvation before exiting the mountains onto the Weippe Prairie, where they first encountered the Nez Perce tribe.

The United States Forest Service has sometimes leased public lands in the Lochsa watershed for timber extraction. Since 2008, the Forest Service has been considering a swap, the Upper Lochsa Land Exchange, with Western Pacific Timber. The land exchange has generated controversy about impacts it might have on water quality and wildlife in the basin. Other issues related to the proposed exchange have involved its effects on the Idaho County tax base, how to calculate the value of the lands being traded, and other economic concerns.

== U.S. Route 12 ==
Route 12 follows the Lochsa River along its north bank. One of the last two-lane U.S. highways constructed, it was completed in the early 1960s, connecting Lewiston with Missoula over Lolo Pass. Two railroads, the Northern Pacific and Union Pacific, had originally planned to ascend the Lochsa; the Northern won the rights and even completed some grades in 1908, but abandoned the project in 1909. The highway along the river was not completed for another 50 years.

In the 21st century, shippers have proposed sending loads as wide as both lanes of Route 12 and up to three stories high from the river port at Lewiston to inland destinations, including the Kearl Oil Sands Project in Alberta, Canada. In June 2012, after several groups had filed lawsuits to prevent the shipments, Imperial Oil and ExxonMobil withdrew their application to use the highway for such large loads.

== Wildlife ==
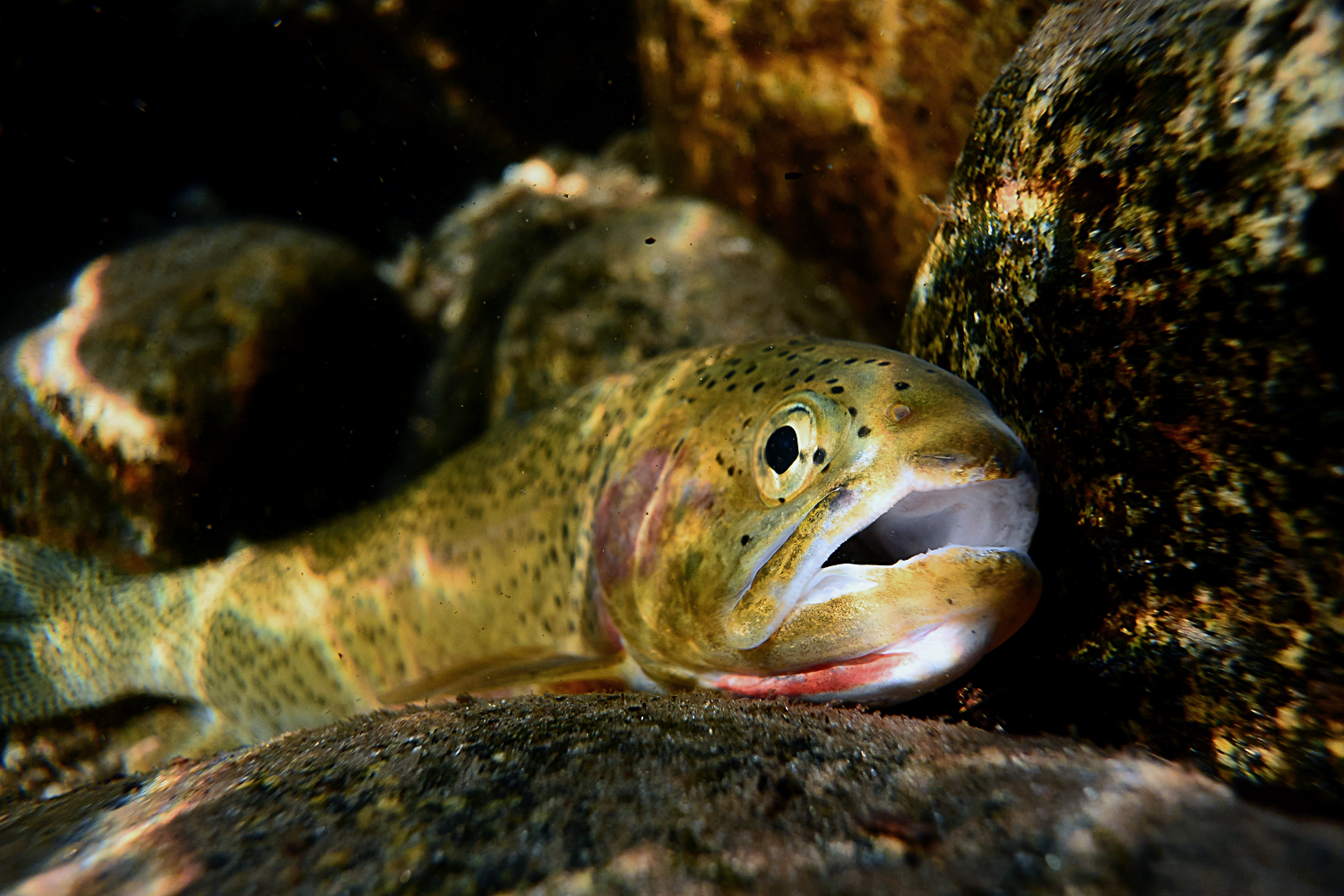
Lochsa river cutthroat trout

Common among the animals using the Lochsa River watershed are deer, elk, black bear, on the hillsides and moose in meadows and wet places. Among the birds along the river are Canada geese, swans, eagles, osprey and great blue herons. Wild turkeys are seen at lower elevations. More rare are mountain lions, snow geese, mountain goats, and harlequin ducks. Cutthroat trout, rainbow trout, chinook salmon and steelhead are among the fish living in the river.

== Recreation ==
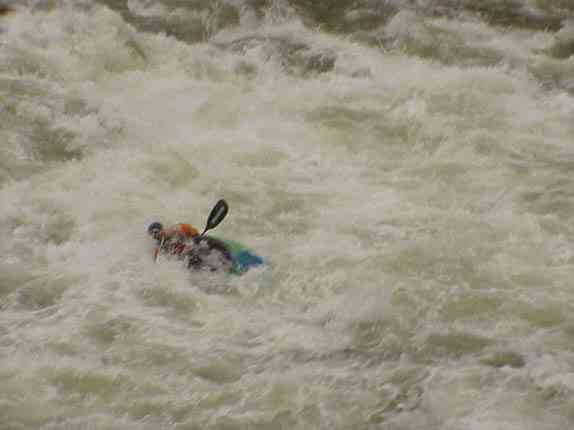
Kayaker in Lochsa River

Kayakers and whitewater rafters run the Lochsa, generally between April and June. The "Lochsa River Floating Guide" lists more than 60 rapids between Powell and Lowell, most of which are rated Class III-IV (medium to difficult). Depending on the discharge rate, the level of difficulty can rise in places to Class VI (the limits of navigation) on the International Scale of River Difficulty. The ratings in the "Floating Guide" reflect the difficulty of the Lochsa's rapids when the water levels at the bridge at Lowell are between 5 feet (1.5 m) and 8 feet (2.4 m). The gage at the bridge differs from the USGS gage. A warning to whitewater rafters posted at the USGS web site for its gage says: "This stage reading is from the USGS gaging station 0.7 miles upstream from Lowell bridge, and it may read between 2-3 feet higher than the stage reading on the staff gage at Lowell bridge. This [the USGS gage reading] is not the stage reference to float the Lochsa River." The USGS site advises rafters to check with the Lochsa Ranger District for readings from the bridge.

The "Floating Guide" describes the Class VI rapids at Castle Creek as follows:

Probably the largest, most technical rapid on the river. A long, twisting rapid whose 1/2-mile length is not totally observable from the water at any one time. Large holes become large waves at high water, and everything pillows left off a huge block of bedrock at the bottom of the rapid. Considered un-runnable at high flows. Must scout. Cannot be seen from highway.

Commercial outfitters offer pre-arranged trips, and people with sufficient technical expertise run the rapids on their own. River access points with parking lots along Highway 12 are at the following sites and highway mile markers: Knife Edge, 107; Split Creek, 111; Fish Creek, 119; Nine Mile, 130, and White Pine, 138. Recreational boaters in search of an outfitter should be aware that there are only five current commercial outfitters. Contact the Lochsa-Powell Ranger District within the United States Forest Service for more information.

Other recreation in the watershed includes backcountry skiing, bicycling on part of the TransAmerica Trail or other roads and trails, fly fishing with daily limits or catch-and-release rules, hiking, swimming, camping, and picnicking.

== Climate ==
There is a weather station near the Powell Ranger Station and Campground, located just below the confluence of Crooked Fork and Colt Killed Creek (also called White Sand Creek). Powell has a dry summer humid continental climate (Köppen Dsb), with long, snowy winters and warm summers.

Climate data for Powell, Idaho, 1991–2020 normals, 1962-2020 records: 3530ft (1076m)
Month	Jan	Feb	Mar	Apr	May	Jun	Jul	Aug	Sep	Oct	Nov	Dec	Year
Record high °F (°C)	50 (10)	64 (18)	74 (23)	87 (31)	96 (36)	99 (37)	102 (39)	105 (41)	102 (39)	90 (32)	67 (19)	49 (9)	105 (41)
Mean maximum °F (°C)	42.4 (5.8)	51.3 (10.7)	62.5 (16.9)	75.0 (23.9)	85.1 (29.5)	91.4 (33.0)	95.9 (35.5)	96.2 (35.7)	89.4 (31.9)	75.5 (24.2)	53.1 (11.7)	40.8 (4.9)	97.9 (36.6)
Mean daily maximum °F (°C)	32.0 (0.0)	36.7 (2.6)	45.5 (7.5)	53.2 (11.8)	63.6 (17.6)	71.4 (21.9)	82.5 (28.1)	82.1 (27.8)	70.6 (21.4)	53.5 (11.9)	37.5 (3.1)	30.0 (−1.1)	54.9 (12.7)
Daily mean °F (°C)	25.0 (−3.9)	27.5 (−2.5)	34.6 (1.4)	41.1 (5.1)	49.5 (9.7)	56.8 (13.8)	64.2 (17.9)	62.8 (17.1)	53.8 (12.1)	41.8 (5.4)	30.9 (−0.6)	23.9 (−4.5)	42.7 (5.9)
Mean daily minimum °F (°C)	18.0 (−7.8)	18.3 (−7.6)	23.8 (−4.6)	29.0 (−1.7)	35.3 (1.8)	42.2 (5.7)	45.9 (7.7)	43.6 (6.4)	37.1 (2.8)	30.1 (−1.1)	24.3 (−4.3)	17.8 (−7.9)	30.5 (−0.9)
Mean minimum °F (°C)	−5.4 (−20.8)	−2.7 (−19.3)	9.5 (−12.5)	19.6 (−6.9)	24.6 (−4.1)	30.8 (−0.7)	36.1 (2.3)	34.3 (1.3)	26.3 (−3.2)	18.1 (−7.7)	7.7 (−13.5)	−4.6 (−20.3)	−13.8 (−25.4)
Record low °F (°C)	−28 (−33)	−25 (−32)	−12 (−24)	8 (−13)	20 (−7)	20 (−7)	28 (−2)	21 (−6)	18 (−8)	2 (−17)	−12 (−24)	−31 (−35)	−31 (−35)
Average precipitation inches (mm)	4.62 (117)	3.34 (85)	3.07 (78)	2.86 (73)	2.97 (75)	3.29 (84)	1.31 (33)	1.32 (34)	1.98 (50)	2.99 (76)	5.45 (138)	4.48 (114)	37.68 (957)
Average snowfall inches (cm)	34.0 (86)	17.7 (45)	17.0 (43)	2.5 (6.4)	1.0 (2.5)	0.2 (0.51)	0.0 (0.0)	0.0 (0.0)	0.0 (0.0)	0.2 (0.51)	13.0 (33)	31.3 (80)	116.9 (296.92)
Average extreme snow depth inches (cm)	35.3 (90)	36.2 (92)	34.1 (87)	14.4 (37)	0.9 (2.3)	0.2 (0.51)	0.0 (0.0)	0.0 (0.0)	0.0 (0.0)	0.2 (0.51)	9.0 (23)	22.8 (58)	43.2 (110)
Source 1: NOAA (1981-2010 precipitation)
Source 2: XMACIS2 (records, 1981-2010 monthly max/mins & 1995-2012 snow)

== See also ==
- List of rivers of Idaho
- List of longest streams of Idaho
- List of National Wild and Scenic Rivers
