= Lowell, Idaho =

Unincorporated community in Idaho, United States

- Unincorporated community
- Location within Idaho Location within the United States
- Coordinates: 46°08′38″N 115°35′49″W
- Country: United States
- State: Idaho
- County: Idaho
- Elevation: 1,486 ft (453 m)

Population (2012)
  - Total: 30
- Time zone: UTC-8 (Pacific (PST))
  - Summer (DST): UTC-7 (PDT)
- ZIP code: 83539 (Kooskia)
- Area codes: 208, 986
- GNIS feature ID: 396823

Lowell is an unincorporated community in Idaho County, Idaho, United States, located at the confluence of the Selway and Lochsa rivers, where they join to form the Middle Fork of the Clearwater River. The community lies within the Nez Perce-Clearwater National Forests at an elevation of 1,486 feet (453 m) above sea level, and was named after Henry Lowell, its first postmaster.

U.S. Route 12 is the only major highway to serve the community, and occupies the north bank of the Lochsa (and Clearwater). Lowell is between the three rivers, and is accessed by a bridge over the terminus of the Lochsa on Selway Road. The population of Lowell is 30, and there are several motels, resorts, and campgrounds that swell the population seasonally.

The site of the Kooskia Internment Camp (1943–45) is about 6 miles (10 km) upstream of Lowell on U.S. 12, on the north bank of the Lochsa River.

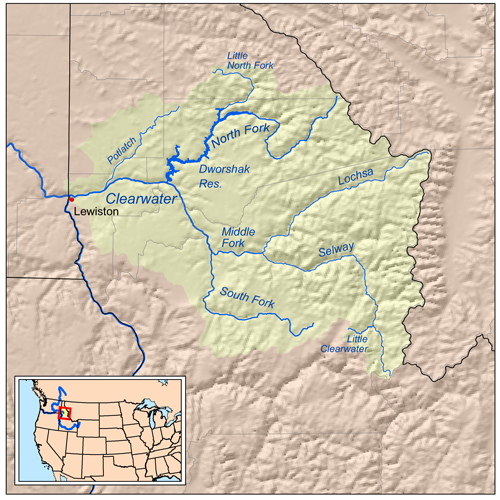
Clearwater River drainage

== Climate ==
This region experiences warm (but not hot) and dry summers, with no average monthly temperatures above 71.6 °F. According to the Köppen Climate Classification system, Lowell has a warm-summer Mediterranean climate, abbreviated "Csb" on climate maps.
