= Clearwater River (Idaho) =

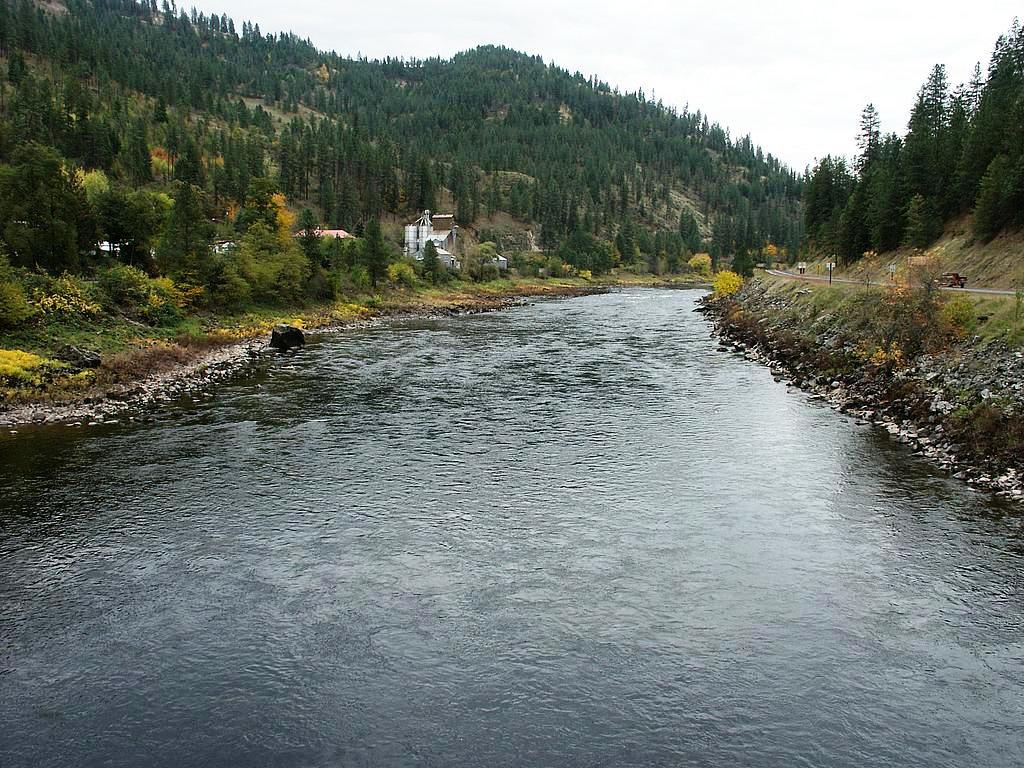
- Clearwater River near Greer Ferry

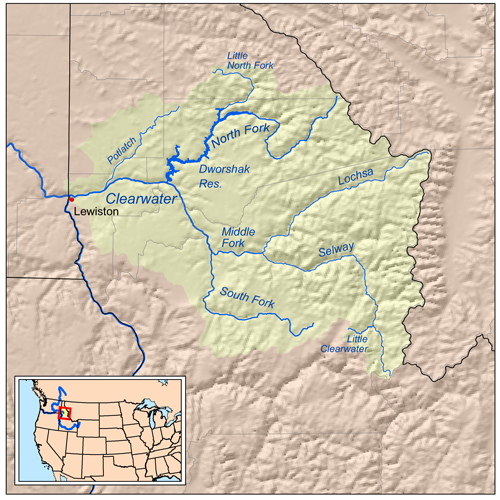
- Map showing the Clearwater River watershed
- Native name: Kooskooskia (Nez Perce)

Location
- Country: United States
- State: Idaho
- Region: Idaho County, Clearwater County, Shoshone County, Nez Perce County
- Cities: Orofino, Lewiston

Physical characteristics
- Source: Middle Fork Clearwater River
  - location: Confluence of Selway River and Lochsa River, Idaho County
  - coordinates: 46°08′28″N 115°35′53″W
  - elevation: 1,453 ft (443 m)
- 2nd source: South Fork Clearwater River
  - location: Near Red River Hot Springs, Idaho County
  - coordinates: 45°52′09″N 115°18′32″W
  - elevation: 4,285 ft (1,306 m)
- Source confluence: Kooskia
  - location: Idaho County
  - coordinates: 46°08′45″N 115°58′56″W
  - elevation: 1,220 ft (370 m)
- Mouth: Snake River
  - location: Lewiston, Nez Perce County
  - coordinates: 46°25′30″N 117°02′14″W
  - elevation: 741 ft (226 m)
- Length: 74.8 mi (120.4 km), Southeast-northwest
- Basin size: 9,645 sq mi (24,980 km^{2})
- Discharge
  - average: 15,300 cu ft/s (430 m^{3}/s)
  - maximum: 109,000 cu ft/s (3,100 m^{3}/s)

Basin features
- River system: Snake River
- Tributaries
  - left: South Fork Clearwater River
  - right: Middle Fork Clearwater River, North Fork Clearwater River, Potlatch River

The Clearwater River is a 74.8-mile-long (120.4 km) river in north central Idaho, United States. It flows westward from the Bitterroot Mountains along the Idaho-Montana border, and joins the Snake River at Lewiston. In October 1805, the Lewis and Clark Expedition descended the Clearwater River in dugout canoes, putting in at "Canoe Camp," five miles (8 km) downstream from Orofino; they reached the Columbia Bar and the Pacific Ocean about six weeks later.

By average discharge, the Clearwater River is the largest tributary of the Snake River. The River got its name from the Niimiipuutímt language term Koos-Koos-Kia - for "clear water".

The drainage basin of the Clearwater River is 9,645 square miles (24,980 km^{2}). Its mean annual discharge is 15,300 cubic feet per second (430 m^{3}/s)

== Course ==
In the small town of Kooskia, the Middle Fork and South Fork of the Clearwater River join their waters to form the main stem of the Clearwater. The larger Middle Fork is made up of the combined flows of the Lochsa and Selway rivers which flow from the Bitterroot Mountains located to the east, while the much smaller South Fork originates in the Selway-Bitterroot Wilderness to the south. From the confluence, the Clearwater flows northwest, passing the Heart of the Monster site of the Nez Perce National Historical Park. U.S. Route 12 follows the river to Kamiah, where Lawyer Creek from the southwest joins it.

The river continues northwest through a canyon to the confluence with Lolo Creek from the east. It soon passes the town of Greer and receives Jim Ford Creek from the east. At Orofino, the river gains the waters of Orofino Creek and swings westward in a nearly straight line for about three miles (5 km), then receives the North Fork from the northeast at Ahsahka, close to Dworshak Reservoir. After the North Fork contributes its flow, the Clearwater continues west and receives Big Canyon Creek from the south and Bedrock Creek from the north.

As the river canyon cuts deeper into the Columbia Plateau, the Clearwater passes the unincorporated communities of Lenore and Myrtle, where it receives Cottonwood Creek from the southeast, and Arrow, where it receives the Potlatch River from the north. Lapwai Creek joins from the south, where the river passes close to Spalding. Here, U.S. Route 95 crosses the Clearwater and is co-signed with U.S. Route 12 along the river's north bank for several miles. The river soon widens and slows into the slack water of Lower Granite Lake as it approaches Lewiston. Just as it crosses the Idaho-Washington state line, it joins its waters with the Snake River.

== Tributaries ==
The Clearwater breaks into several separate forks:

- Clearwater River (west of Orofino to Lewiston-Snake River)
  - Potlatch River (Latah, Clearwater and Nez Perce Counties)
  - North Fork Clearwater River (stream, Clearwater County - 46°29′59″N 116°19′49″W; headwaters near Illinois Peak to just west of Orofino)
    - Little North Fork Clearwater River (stream, Shoshone & Clearwater Counties; headwaters in south-central Shoshone County, joins the North Fork in the Dworshak Reservoir)
  - Middle Fork Clearwater River (stream, Idaho County - 46°08′43″N 115°58′56″W; formed by the confluence of the Selway and Lochsa at Lowell)
  - South Fork Clearwater River (stream, Idaho County - 46°08′44″N 115°58′56″W; headwaters near Red River Hot Springs to Kooskia, confluence with the Middle Fork)
    - Little Clearwater River (stream, Idaho County - 45°45′11″N 114°46′31″W; near Three Prong Mountain to near Spot Mountain)

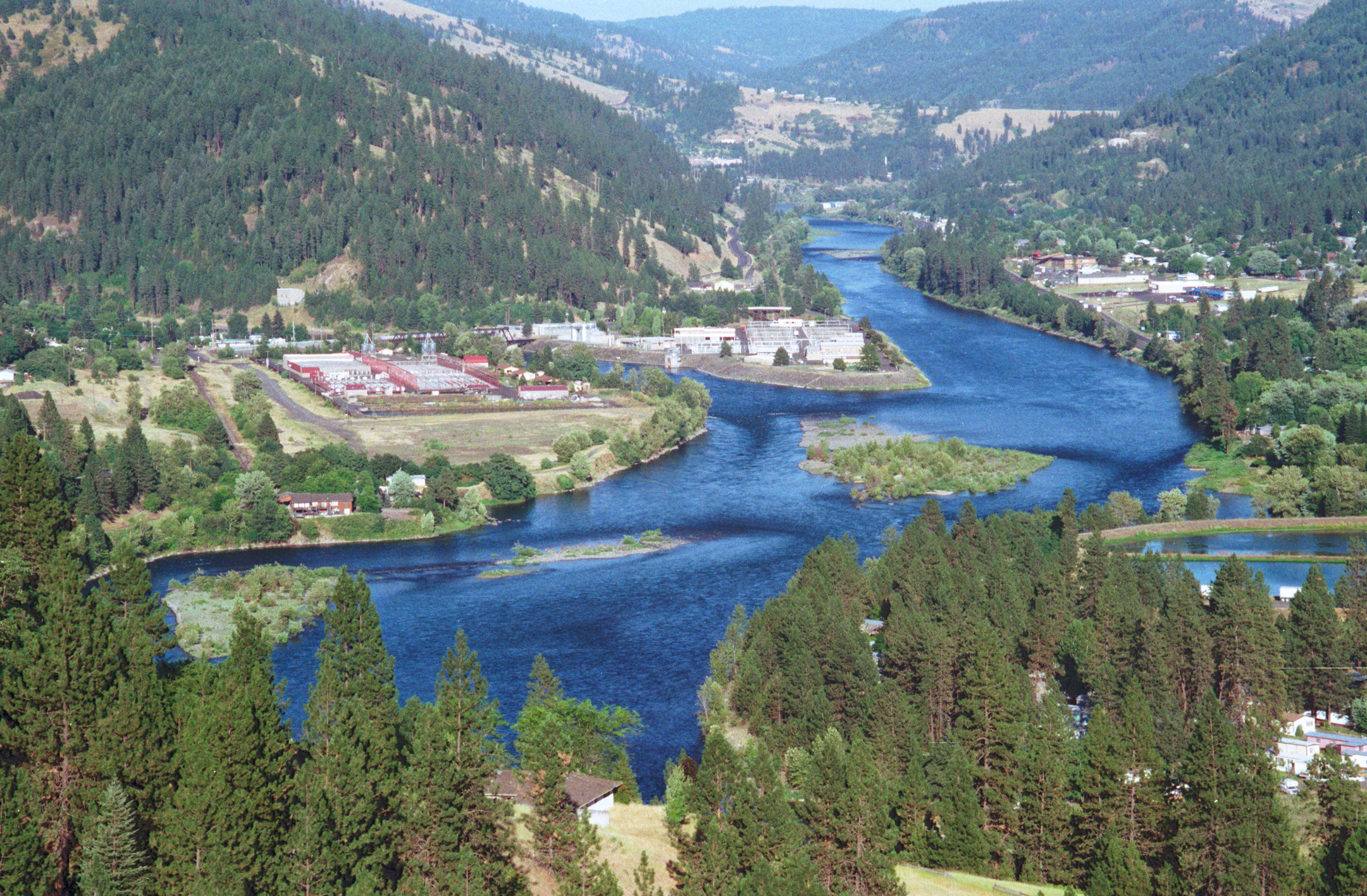
Clearwater River near Orofino, ID

== Dams ==
The Dworshak Reservoir is the only major lake on the Clearwater system, created from the Dworshak Dam, completed in the early 1970s. Dworshak Dam is on the North Fork of the Clearwater River and is just northwest of Orofino. There is no fish ladder; the dam blocks salmon and steelhead passage.

=== Lewiston Dam ===
Lewiston Dam was a 45-foot-high (14 m) hydroelectric dam on the lower Clearwater River, four miles (6.5 km) upstream (46.433°N 116.954°W) from its confluence with the Snake River. Built by the Inland Power and Light Company in 1927, the dam was acquired by Washington Water Power Company in 1937. Lewiston Dam operated for a total of 46 years before being demolished in 1973 to make way for Lower Granite Lake, the slack water pool behind Lower Granite Dam, itself completed in 1975.

Lewiston Dam's original 1927 fish ladder was impassable by Chinook salmon, functionally eliminating them from the Clearwater basin. Steelhead could pass only with difficulty, leading to a decline in their numbers. Two additional fish ladders were built in 1939, and all three ladders were upgraded in the 1960s. While Lewiston Dam's demolition in 1973 fully opened the Clearwater River to fish passage, it coincided with the construction of the four lower Snake River dams, which severely limit fish migration into the Clearwater. In 1999, Avista Corporation (renamed from Washington Water Power Company) reached a $39 million settlement with the Nez Perce Tribe for fish losses caused by Lewiston Dam and Grangeville Dam.

== History ==
The border between Washington and Idaho was defined as the meridian running north from the confluence of the Clearwater River and the Snake River. Although this border is often referred to as the 117th meridian west longitude, the actual border line is slightly west (less than 2 miles) of the 117th meridian.

== See also ==
- List of rivers of Idaho
- List of longest streams of Idaho
