= List of place names of Czech origin in the United States =

Several dozen place names in the United States have names of Czech origin, most a legacy of Czech immigration to the United States. Others were named after Americans of Czech ancestry, such as the Bohemian explorer Augustine Herman and Chicago's mayor Anton Cermak. Many places which were settled by Czech immigrants named their towns after the cities they had immigrated from in what was then Bohemia and Moravia, regions that are now located in the Czech Republic.

== California ==
- Carlsbad, named by a spa city in the western Czech Republic Karlovy Vary or Carlsbad in English.

== Delaware ==
- Bohemia River, named by the Bohemian explorer Augustine Herman.

== Florida ==
- Masaryktown, named in honor of Tomáš Garrigue Masaryk, the first president of Czechoslovakia

== Idaho ==
- Dworshak Dam, named in honor of Idaho Senator Henry Dworshak.
- Dworshak National Fish Hatchery
- Dworshak State Park

== Illinois ==
- Cermak Road, named in honor of Anton Cermak, Chicago's mayor from 1931 until his assassination in 1933.
- Cermak (CTA station)
- Cermak–Chinatown (CTA station)
- Pilsen, historically Czech neighborhood of Chicago.
- Pilsen Historic District, historic district of Chicago named after Plzeň, Czech Republic.

== Iowa ==
- Czech Village, a historically Czech neighborhood of Cedar Rapids, Iowa.
- Moravia, named after Moravians who came from North Carolina.
- Protivin, named by Bohemian immigrants after Protivín, Czech Republic.

== Kansas ==
- Pilsen, named after the city of Plzeň, Czech Republic.

== Louisiana ==
- Bohemia
- Kolin, named by Czech immigrants from Kolín, Czech Republic.
- Libuse, named by Czech immigrants for Libuše, a legendary ancestress of the Czech people.

== Maryland ==
- Bohemia Farm
- Bohemia Manor High School
- Bohemia Manor Middle School
- Bohemia River
- Old Bohemia Wildlife Management Area
- St. Augustine, named in honor of the Bohemian explorer Augustine Herman.
- Village of Bohemia, the original name of Chesapeake City, Maryland. Chesapeake = Czechspeak = Czech spoken here.

== Michigan ==
- Bohemia Township
- Mount Bohemia

== Minnesota ==
- Beroun, named by Czech immigrants from Beroun, Czech Republic.
- Bohemian Flats, a former residential area of Minneapolis that was settled by Czechoslovak and other European immigrants.
- Litomysl, named after Litomyšl, Czech Republic.
- New Prague, named by Czech immigrants after Prague, the capital of the Czech Republic.
- Tabor Township, named after the town of Tábor, Czech Republic.
- Veseli, named after Veselí nad Lužnicí, Czech Republic.

== Montana ==
- Kolin, Montana, named after Kolín, Czech Republic.

== Nebraska ==
- Bohemian Alps, a cultural region of Nebraska that was settled by Czech immigrants.
- Bohemia Township, Knox County
- Bohemia Township, Saunders County
- Czechland Lake Recreation Area
- Little Bohemia, a historically Czech neighborhood of Omaha, Nebraska.
- Prague, named after Prague, the capital of the Czech Republic; some of the street names include: Moldau, Elbe, Danube, Moravia or Waldstein
- Bruno, named after Brno, the second largest Czech city

== New Mexico ==
- Carlsbad, named by a spa city in the western Czech Republic Karlovy Vary or Carlsbad in English.

== New York ==
- Bohemia, New York, named by Bohemian settlers from Kadaň, Bohemia.
- Bohemian Boulevard, the historic name of Manhattan's 72nd Street, which was then a Czech enclave.
- Moravia (town)
- Moravia (village)

== North Carolina ==
- Moravian Falls
- Moravian Falls, North Carolina, named after Moravian settlers.

== North Dakota ==
- New Hradec, (originally named "Novy Hradec", named after Hradec Králové) settled by Czech immigrants from Czechohrad in Crimea, Ukraine.
- Pisek, ("sand" in Czech) settled by Bohemians and named after Písek, Czech Republic.

== Ohio ==
- Karlin, a neighborhood of South Broadway, Cleveland, named by Czech immigrants from Karlín.

== Oklahoma ==
- Prague, named after Prague, the capital of the Czech Republic.

== Oregon ==
- Bohemia Mountain, named after the Czech immigrant James "Bohemia" Johnson.
- Malin, named by Czech settlers after the village of Malín (now part of Kutná Hora).

== Pennsylvania ==
- Lititz, named after Litice Castle in the Czech Republic by members of the Moravian Church.

== South Dakota ==
- Tabor, named after the town of Tábor, Czech Republic.

== Texas ==
- Frydek, settled by Czech immigrants and named after Frýdek, a town in Moravia.
- Frenstat
- Hostyn, settled by Czech immigrants and named after Hostýn, a hill in Moravia.
- Moravia, settled by Czech immigrants and named after Moravia.
- Nechanitz, settled by Czech settlers and named after the town of Nechanice in Bohemia.
- Praha, ("Prague" in English) settled by Czech immigrants and named after Prague, the capital of the Czech Republic.
- Roznov, named after Rožnov pod Radhoštěm

== Virginia ==
- New Bohemia, Virginia, named by Bohemian immigrants to the region.

== Wisconsin ==
- Czechville
- Krok, settled by Czech immigrants and named after Krok, the father of Libuše in Czech legend.
- Pilsen, named after the city of Plzeň.
- Pilsen (community), named by Czech immigrants after the city of Plzeň.

== See also ==
- List of U.S. state name etymologies
- Lists of U.S. county name etymologies
- List of U.S. place names of French origin
- List of U.S. place names of Spanish origin
- List of non-US places that have a US place named after them
