= Bohemia Township, Nebraska =

Bohemia Township, Nebraska may refer to the following places in Nebraska:

- Bohemia Township, Knox County, Nebraska
- Bohemia Township, Saunders County, Nebraska

== See also ==
- Bohemia Township (disambiguation)
