= Dworshak =

Dworshak may refer to:

- Henry Dworshak (1894–1962), United States senator and congressman from Idaho
- Dworshak Dam, in Idaho, US
  - Dworshak State Park
- Dworshak National Fish Hatchery, in Idaho, US

== See also ==
- Dvořák (name)
