= List of tallest dams in the United States =

This is a list of the tallest dams in the United States. The main list includes all U.S. dams over 300 feet (91 m) tall, and a second list gives the tallest dams in each state. Dimensions given are for foundation height, not hydraulic height or head. Structures such as levees, dikes and tailings dams are not included in the lists. Decommissioned or failed dams, such as Teton Dam in Idaho, are included. Both lists are works in progress and will be updated periodically with new information. There are currently 75 entries on the main list.

Most of the U.S.'s taller dams are located in the west because of the steeper and more rugged topography. The tallest is Oroville Dam in northern California, a 770.5-foot (234.8 m) embankment dam completed in 1968. Five of the ten tallest dams in the U.S. are located in California. The Colorado, Columbia and Sacramento–San Joaquin river systems contain the greatest number of tall dams. In the eastern U.S., tall dams are less common because of the lesser vertical relief. The tallest dam in the eastern U.S. is 480-foot (150 m) Fontana Dam in North Carolina, which ranks 20th in height among all U.S. dams.

Key
†Dam has been raised since initial construction

== Tallest dams ==
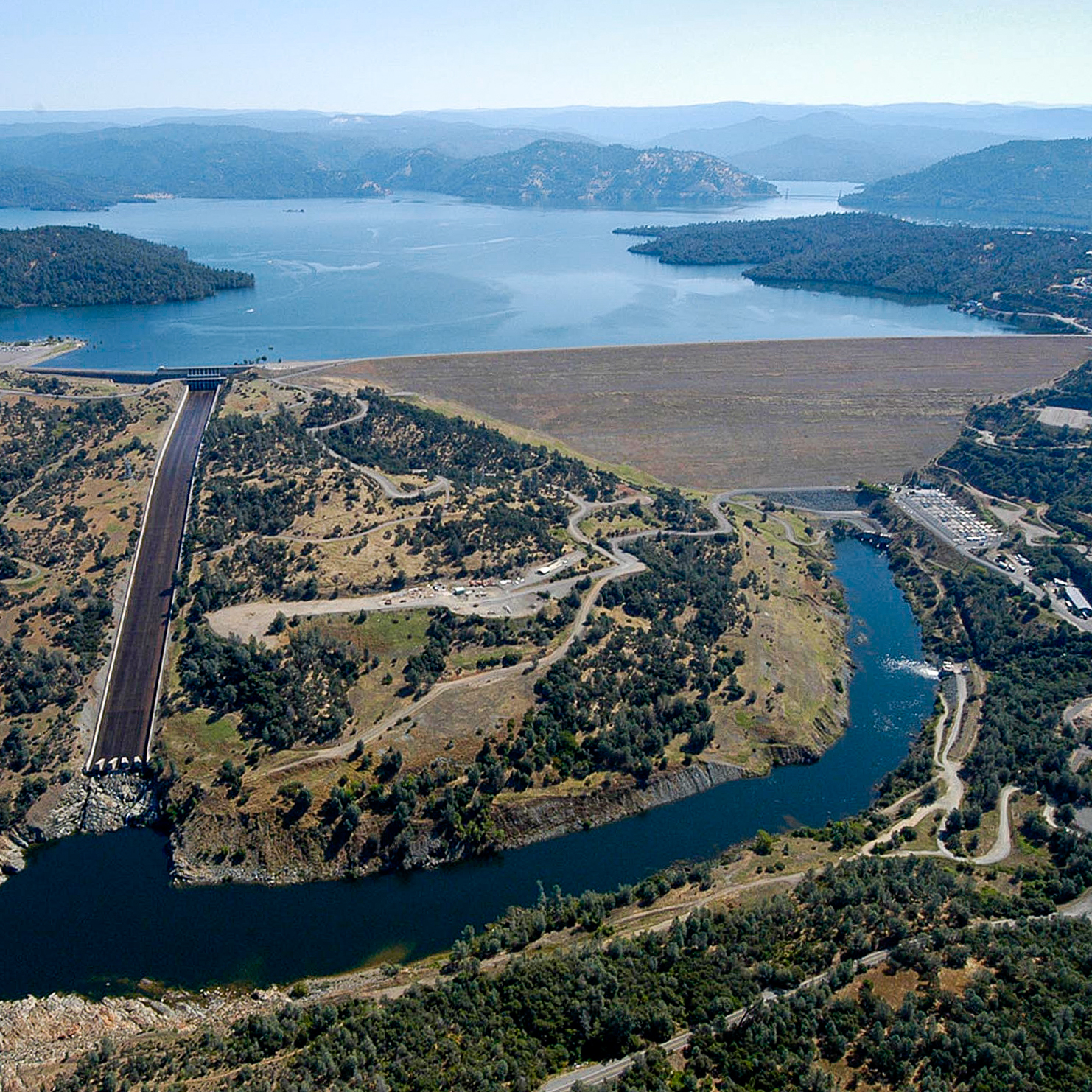
Oroville Dam, 1st

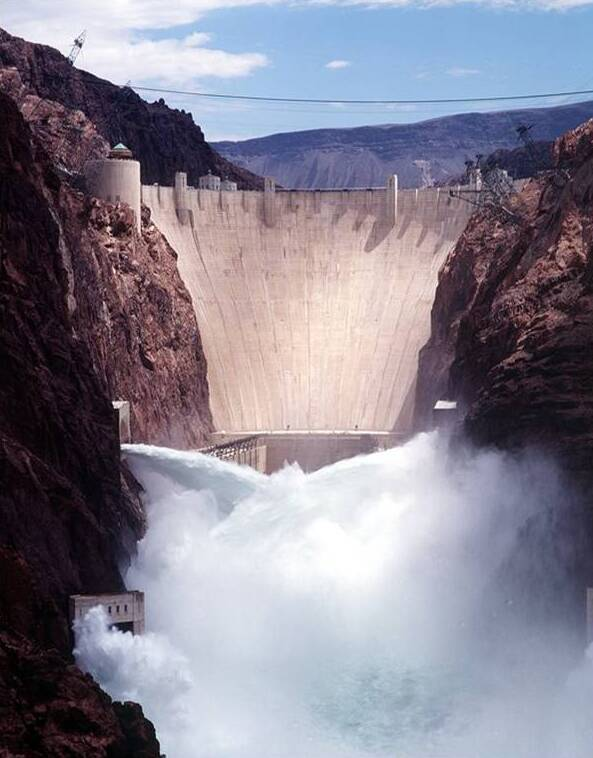
Hoover Dam, 2nd

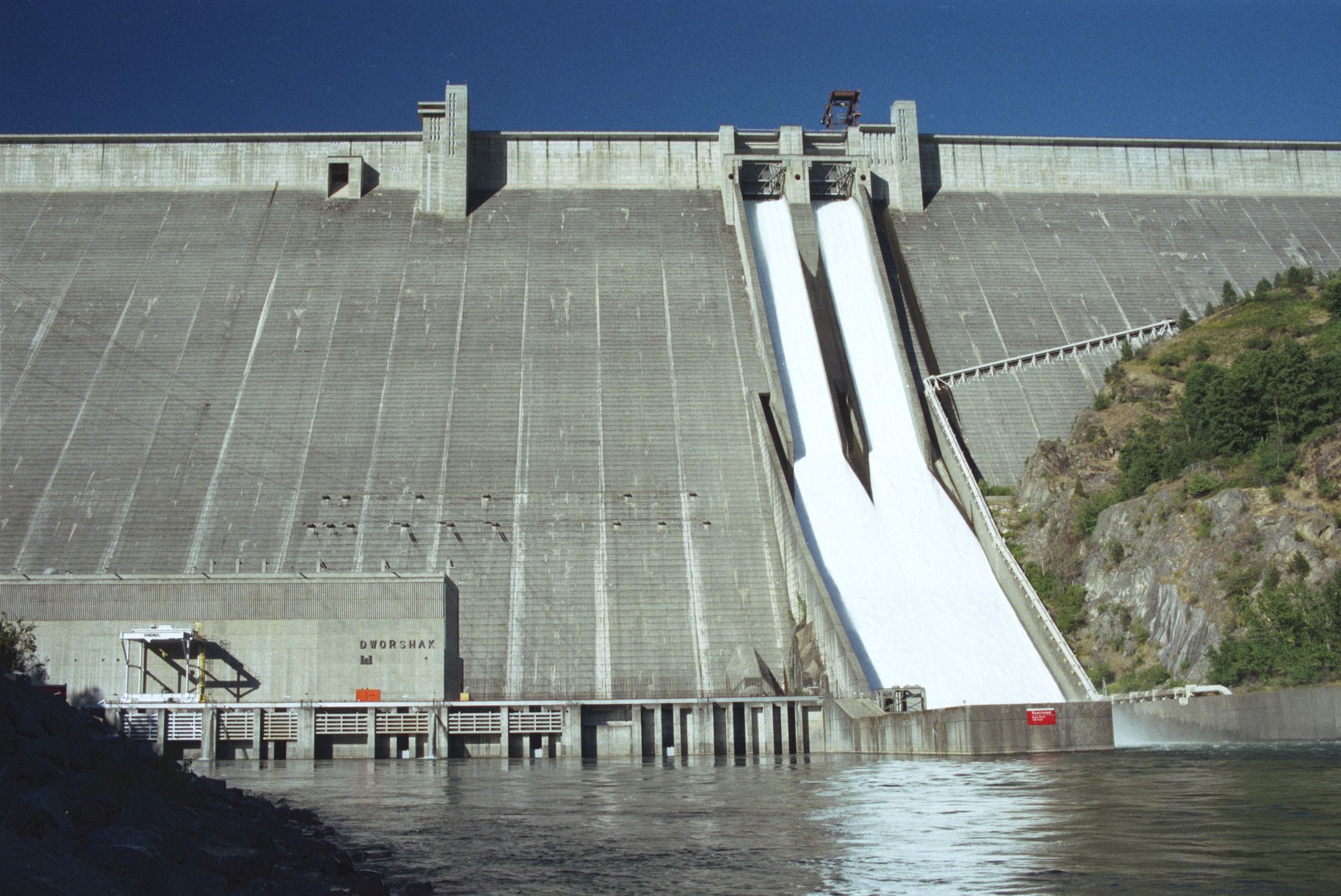
Dworshak Dam, 3rd

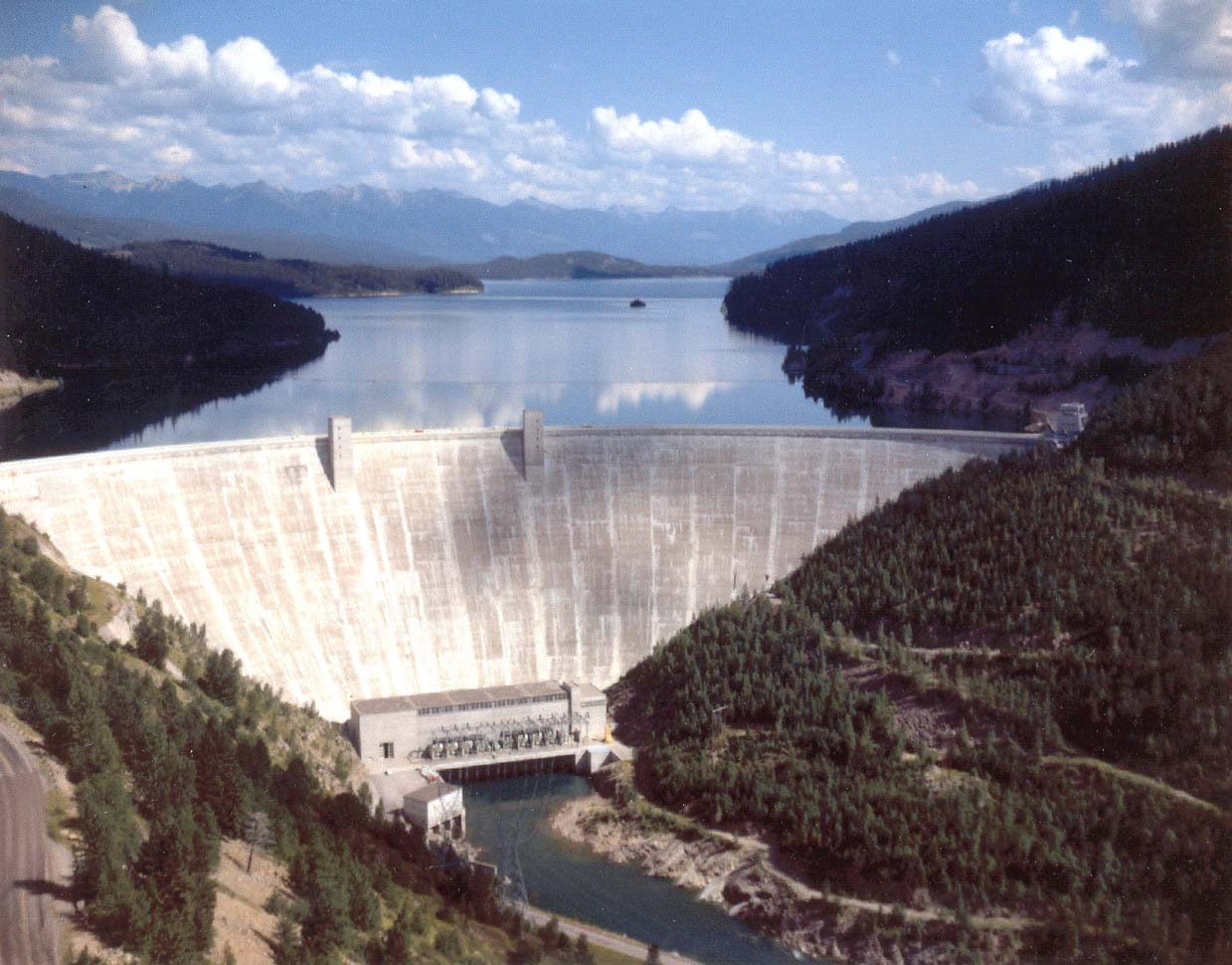
Hungry Horse Dam, 10th

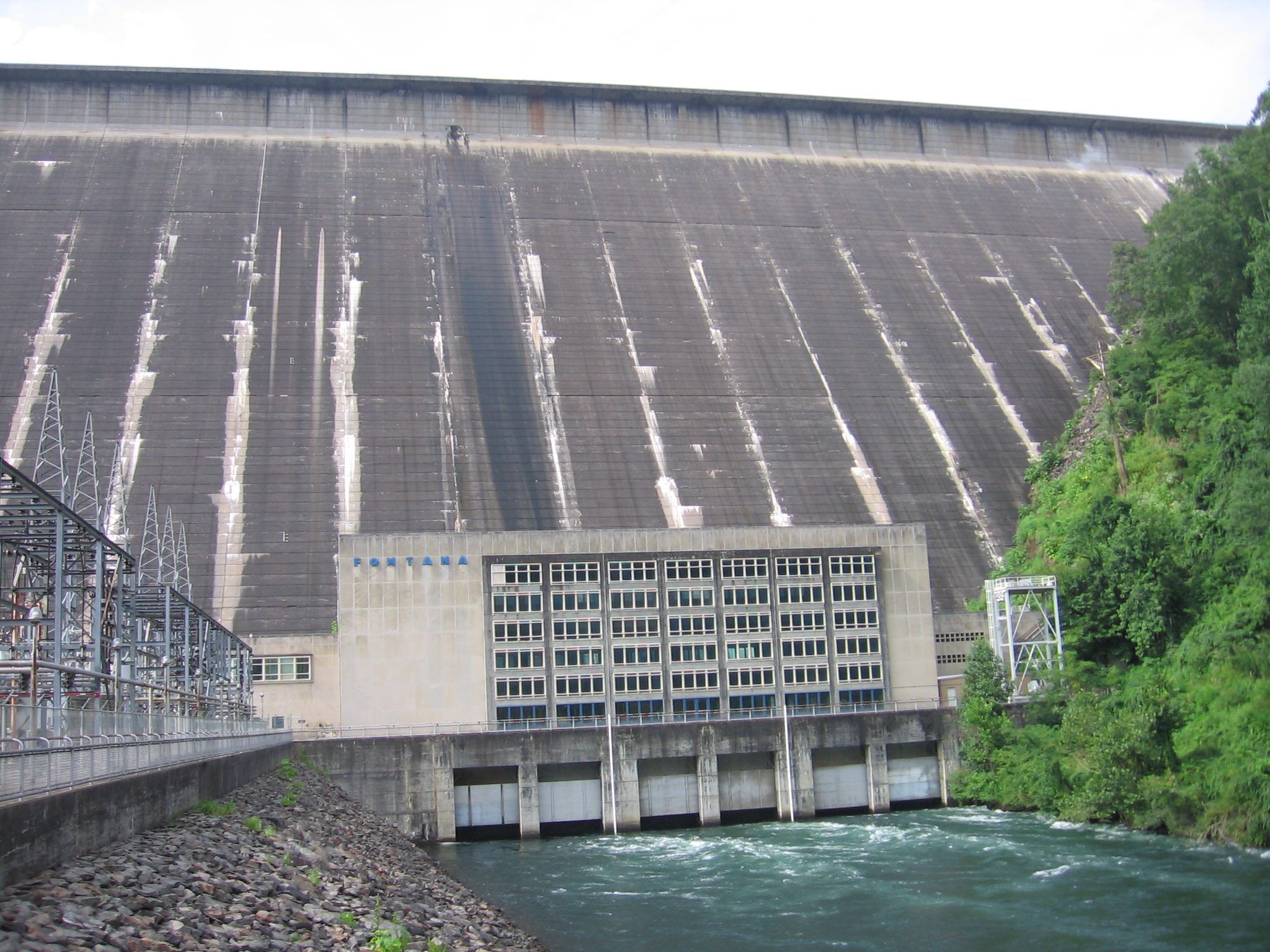
Fontana Dam, 20th

Name	State(s)	Height		Type	River	Coordinates	Built
Name	State(s)	ft	m	Type	River	Coordinates	Built
Oroville Dam	CA	770.5	234.8	Embankment	Feather River	39°32′20″N 121°29′08″W	1968
Hoover Dam	AZ; NV	726	221	Arch-gravity dam	Colorado River	36°00′56″N 114°44′16″W	1936
Dworshak Dam	ID	717	219	Concrete gravity	N.F. Clearwater River	46°30′54″N 116°17′49″W	1973
Glen Canyon Dam	AZ	710	220	Concrete arch	Colorado River	36°56′15″N 111°29′04″W	1966
New Bullards Bar Dam	CA	645	197	Concrete arch	N. Yuba River	39°23′36″N 121°08′35″W	1969
New Melones Dam	CA	625	191	Embankment	Stanislaus River	37°56′50″N 120°31′41″W	1979
Mossyrock Dam	WA	606	185	Concrete arch	Cowlitz River	46°32′04″N 122°25′34″W	1968
Shasta Dam	CA	602	183	Concrete gravity	Sacramento River	40°43′07″N 122°25′08″W	1945
New Don Pedro Dam	CA	585	178	Embankment	Tuolumne River	37°41′58″N 120°25′15″W	1971
Hungry Horse Dam	MT	564	172	Concrete arch	S.F. Flathead River	48°20′30″N 114°00′51″W	1953
Grand Coulee Dam	WA	550	170	Concrete gravity	Columbia River	47°57′21″N 118°58′54″W	1942
Seven Oaks Dam	CA	550	170	Embankment	Santa Ana River	34°08′45″N 117°03′45″W	2000
Ross Dam	WA	540	160	Concrete arch	Skagit River	48°43′54″N 121°04′02″W	1949
Trinity Dam	CA	538	164	Embankment	Trinity River	40°48′04″N 122°45′48″W	1962
Yellowtail Dam	MT	525	160	Concrete arch	Bighorn River	45°18′24″N 107°57′29″W	1967
Cougar Dam	OR	519	158	Embankment	S.F. McKenzie River	44°07′44″N 122°14′25″W	1964
Swift Dam	WA	512	156	Embankment	Lewis River	46°04′47″N 122°11′52″W	1958
Flaming Gorge Dam	UT	502	153	Concrete arch	Green River	40°54′52″N 109°25′17″W	1964
New Exchequer Dam	CA	490	150	Concrete-faced rockfill	Merced River	37°35′10″N 120°16′10″W	1967
Fontana Dam	NC	480	150	Concrete gravity	Little Tennessee River	35°27′08″N 83°48′17″W	1944
Morrow Point Dam	CO	468	143	Concrete arch	Gunnison River	36°27′07″N 107°32′17″W	1968
Detroit Dam	OR	463	141	Concrete gravity	North Santiam River	44°43′15″N 122°14′59″W	1953
Bath County Pumped Storage Station Upper Dam	VA	460	140	Embankment	Little Back Creek	38°13′32″N 79°49′27″W	1984
Anderson Ranch Dam	ID	456	139	Embankment	S.F. Boise River	43°21′27″N 115°26′55″W	1950
Union Valley Dam	CA	453	138	Embankment	Silver Creek	38°51′55″N 120°26′30″W	1963
Carters Dam	GA	445	136	Embankment	Coosawattee River	34°36′55.4″N 84°40′26″W	1977
New Waddell Dam	AZ	440	130	Embankment	Agua Fria River	33°50′49″N 112°15′58″W	1994
Pine Flat Dam	CA	440	130	Concrete gravity	Kings River	36°49′56″N 119°19′34″W	1954
Round Butte Dam	OR	440	130	Embankment	Deschutes River	44°36′11″N 121°16′40″W	1964
Mud Mountain Dam	WA	432	132	Embankment	White River	47°08′24″N 121°55′55″W	1948
O'Shaughnessy Dam	CA	430	130	Concrete arch	Tuolumne River	37°56′51″N 119°47′17″W	1923 (1938)
Libby Dam	MT	422	129	Concrete gravity	Kootenai River	48°24′42″N 115°18′34″W	1975
Brownlee Dam	ID; OR	420	130	Embankment	Snake River	44°50′10″N 116°54′00″W	1958
Owyhee Dam	OR	417	127	Concrete arch	Owyhee River	43°38′31″N 117°14′33″W	1932
Mammoth Pool Dam	CA	411	125	Embankment	San Joaquin River	37°19′23″N 119°18′58″W	1959
Hell Hole Dam	CA	410	120	Embankment	Rubicon River	39°03′26″N 120°24′32″W	1966
Navajo Dam	NM	402	123	Embankment	San Juan River	36°48′01″N 107°36′45″W	1962
Blue Mesa Dam	CO	390	120	Embankment	Gunnison River	38°27′02″N 107°20′06″W	1966
Summersville Dam	WV	390	120	Rockfill	Gauley River	38°13′18″N 80°53′23″W	1966
Lewiston Dam	NY	389	119	Concrete gravity	Niagara River	43°08′35″N 79°02′23″W	1963
Diablo Dam	WA	389	119	Concrete arch	Skagit River	48°42′51″N 121°07′52″W	1930
Pyramid Dam	CA	386	118	Embankment	Piru Creek	34°38′39″N 118°45′50″W	1970
Jocassee Dam	SC	385	117	Embankment	Keowee River	34°57′35″N 82°55′02″W	1973
Pacoima Dam	CA	365	111	Variable radius arch	Pacoima Creek	34°20′05″N 118°23′47″W	1929
Theodore Roosevelt Dam	AZ	357	109	Concrete arch	Salt River	33°40′18″N 111°09′40″W	1911 (1996)
Arrowrock Dam	ID	350	110	Concrete arch	Boise River	43°35′44″N 115°55′20″W	1915
Buffalo Bill Dam	WY	350	110	Concrete arch	Shoshone River	44°30′06″N 109°11′03″W	1910
Jordanelle Dam	UT	345	105	Embankment	Provo River	40°35′52″N 111°25′26″W	1992
Pardee Dam	CA	345	105	Gravity	Mokelumne River	38°15′27″N 120°51′01″W	1929
William L. Jess Dam	OR	345	105	Embankment	Rogue River	42°40′17″N 122°40′30″W	1976
Abiquiu Dam	NM	340	100	Embankment	Rio Chama	36°14′17″N 106°25′33″W	1963 (1986)
Boundary Dam	WA	340	100	Concrete arch-gravity	Pend Oreille River	48°59′14″N 117°20′51″W	1967
Castaic Dam	CA	340	100	Embankment	Castaic Creek	34°31′09″N 118°36′25″W	1973
Folsom Dam	CA	340	100	Concrete gravity, embankment	American River	38°42′28″N 121°09′23″W	1956
Lucky Peak Dam	ID	340	100	Embankment	Boise River	43°31′42″N 116°03′11″W	1955
San Vicente Dam	CA	337	103	Roller-Compacted Concrete	Off-stream	32°54′44″N 116°55′28″W	1943 (2014)
Ridgway Dam	CO	333	101	Embankment	Uncompahgre River	38°14′15″N 107°45′33″W	1987
Salt Springs Dam	CA	332	101	Rock-fill	North Fork Mokelumne River	38°29′54″N 120°12′58″W	1931
Alder Dam	WA	330	100	Concrete arch	Nisqually River	46°48′05″N 122°18′37″W	1945
Hells Canyon Dam	ID; OR	330	100	Concrete gravity	Snake River	45°14′41″N 116°41′54″W	1967
Green Peter Dam	OR	327	100	Concrete gravity	M. Santiam River	44°27′07″N 122°32′49″W	1967
Crystal Dam	CO	323	98	Concrete arch	Gunnison River	38°30′38″N 107°37′31″W	1976
Yale Dam	WA	323	98	Embankment	Lewis River	45°57′51″N 122°19′57″W	1953
Parker Dam	AZ; CA	320	98	Concrete arch	Colorado River	34°17′47″N 114°08′21″W	1938
Tieton Dam	WA	319	97	Embankment	Tieton River	46°39′23″N 121°07′46″W	1925
Warm Springs Dam	CA	319	97	Rolled-earth embankment	Dry Creek	38°43′06″N 123°00′46″W	1982
Friant Dam	CA	319	97	Concrete gravity	San Joaquin River	37°00′02″N 119°42′19″W	1942
Olivenhain Dam	CA	318	97	Concrete gravity	off-stream	33°04′13″N 117°08′17″W	2003
Watauga Dam	TN	318	97	Rockfill	Watauga River	36°19′25″N 82°07′22″W	1948
Donnells Dam	CA	317	97	Concrete arch	Middle Fork Stanislaus River	38°19′50″N 119°57′38″W	1958
Cherry Valley Dam	CA	315	96	Earth and rock	Cherry Creek	37°58′34″N 119°54′33″W	1956
Courtright Dam	CA	315	96	Rock-fill	Helms Creek	37°04′44″N 118°58′12″W	1958
San Gabriel Dam	CA	315	96	Embankment	San Gabriel River	34°12′20″N 117°52′33″W	1939
Merwin Dam	WA	313	95	Concrete arch	Lewis River	45°57′24″N 122°33′18″W	1931
Upper Stillwater Dam	UT	310	94	Concrete gravity	Rock Creek	40°33′35″N 110°41′59″W	1987
Bartlett Dam	AZ	309	94	Multiple arch buttress	Verde River	33°49′05″N 111°37′54″W	1939
Green Mountain Dam	CO	309	94	Embankment	Blue River	39°52′39″N 106°19′49″W	1942
Horse Mesa Dam	AZ	305	93	Concrete arch	Salt River	33°35′27″N 111°20′38″W	1927
San Luis Dam	CA	305	93	Embankment	San Luis Creek	37°03′33″N 121°04′29″W	1967
Teton Dam (Note: Dam failed during first filling in June 1976.)	ID	305	93	Embankment	Teton River	43°54′35″N 111°32′31″W	1976
Monticello Dam	CA	304	93	Concrete arch	Putah Creek	38°30′47″N 122°06′15″W	1957
Elephant Butte Dam	NM	301	92	Concrete gravity	Rio Grande	33°09′14″N 107°11′32″W	1916
Gorge Dam	WA	300	91	Concrete gravity	Skagit River	48°41′52″N 121°12′30″W	1924
Smith Lake Dam	AL	300	91	Embankment	Sipsey Fork	33°56′31″N 87°06′21″W	1961

== Tallest dams by state ==
State	Name	Height		Type	River	Coordinates	Built
		ft	m				
Alabama	Smith Lake Dam	300	91	Embankment	Sipsey Fork	33°56′31″N 87°06′21″W	1961
Alaska	Green Lake Dam	210	64	Concrete arch	Vodopad River	56°59′08″N 135°06′48″W	
Arizona	Hoover Dam	726	221	Concrete arch	Colorado River	36°00′56″N 114°44′16″W	1936
Arkansas	Bull Shoals Dam	256	78	Concrete gravity	White River (Arkansas)	36°21′58″N 92°34′29″W	1951
California	Oroville Dam	770	230	Embankment	Feather River	39°32′20″N 121°29′08″W	1968
Colorado	Morrow Point Dam	468	143	Concrete arch	Gunnison River	36°27′07″N 107°32′17″W	1968
Connecticut	Colebrook River Dam	215	66	Embankment	Farmington River	42°00′22″N 73°02′12″W	1969
Delaware	Edgar M. Hoopes Dam	135	41	Concrete gravity	Old Mill Stream	39°46′27″N 75°38′03″W	1932
Florida	Jim Woodruff Dam	92	28	Concrete gravity	Apalachicola River	30°42′30″N 84°51′50″W	1952
Georgia	Carters Dam	445	136	Embankment	Coosawattee River	34°36′55″N 84°40′26″W	1977
Hawaii	Alexander Dam	113	34	Embankment	Wahiawa Stream	21°57′30″N 159°31′32″W	1931
Idaho	Dworshak Dam	717	219	Concrete gravity	N.F. Clearwater River	46°30′54″N 116°17′49″W	1973
Illinois	Lake Shelbyville Dam	138	42	Embankment	Kaskaskia River	39°24′33″N 88°46′50″W	1970
Indiana	Brookville Lake Dam	181	55	Embankment	Whitewater River	39°26′23″N 84°59′56″W	1974
Iowa	Coralville Dam	132	40	Embankment	Iowa River	41°43′28″N 91°31′47″W	1958
Kansas	Cedar Bluff Dam	202	62	Embankment	Smoky Hill River	38°47′12″N 99°43′17″W	1952
Kentucky	Dix River Dam	287	87	Rockfill	Dix River	37°47′08″N 84°42′14″W	1925
Louisiana	Toledo Bend Dam	110	34	Embankment	Sabine River	31°10′25″N 93°33′57″W	1969
Maine	Harris Station Dam	175	53	Concrete gravity	Kennebec River	45°27′37″N 69°51′55″W	1955
Maryland	Conowingo Dam	175	53	Concrete gravity	Susquehanna River	39°39′36″N 76°10′26″W	1929
Massachusetts	Wachusett Dam	205	62	Concrete gravity	Nashua River	42°24′13″N 71°41′16″W	1905
Michigan	Hardy Dam	120	37	Earthfill	Muskegon River	43°29′18″N 85°37′56″W	1931
Minnesota	Rapidan Dam	87	27	Concrete Gravity	Blue Earth River	44.092727°N 94.108662°W	1908
Mississippi	Sardis Dam	117	36	Earthfill	Little Tallahatchie River	34°24′31″N 89°47′46″W	1940
Missouri	Table Rock Dam	220	67	Concrete gravity	White River	36°34′00″N 93°18′0″W	1958
Montana	Hungry Horse Dam	564	172	Concrete arch	S.F. Flathead River	48°20′30″N 114°00′51″W	1953
Nebraska	Medicine Creek Dam	165	50	Earthfill	Medicine Creek	40°22′44″N 100°13′08″W	1949
Nevada	Hoover Dam	726	221	Concrete arch	Colorado River	36°00′56″N 114°44′16″W	1936
New Hampshire	Moore Dam	178	54	Embankment	Connecticut River	34°36′55″N 84°40′26″W	1957
New Jersey	Merrill Creek Dam	280	85	Embankment	Merrill Creek	40°43′34″N 75°06′10″W	1987
New Mexico	Navajo Dam	402	123	Embankment	San Juan River	36°48′01″N 107°36′45″W	1962
New York	Lewiston Dam	389	119	Concrete gravity	Niagara River	43°08′35″N 79°02′23″W	1963
North Carolina	Fontana Dam	480	150	Concrete gravity	Little Tennessee River	35°27′08″N 83°48′17″W	1944
North Dakota	Garrison Dam	210	64	Embankment	Missouri River	47°29′55″N 101°24′43″W	1953
Ohio	William Harsha Dam	205	62	Rockfill	East Fork Little Miami River	39°01′21″N 84°09′01″W	1973
Oklahoma	Broken Bow Dam	225	69	Embankment	Mountain Fork River	34°08′44″N 94°41′08″W	1968
Oregon	Cougar Dam	519	158	Embankment	S.F. McKenzie River	44°07′44″N 122°14′25″W	1964
Pennsylvania	Raystown Dam	190	58	Earthfill	Raystown Branch Juniata River	40°26′01″N 78°00′24″W	1973
Rhode Island	Scituate Reservoir Dam	100	30	Earthfill	North Branch Pawtuxet River	41°45′N 71°35′W	1921
South Carolina	Jocassee Dam	385	117	Embankment	Keowee River	34°57′35″N 82°55′02″W	1973
South Dakota	Oahe Dam	245	75	Embankment	Missouri River	44°27′04″N 100°24′08″W	1962
Tennessee	Watauga Dam	318	97	Rockfill	Watauga River	36°19′25″N 82°07′22″W	1948
Texas	Mansfield Dam	278	85	Concrete gravity	Colorado River (Texas)	30°23′30″N 97°54′26″W	1941
Utah	Flaming Gorge Dam	502	153	Concrete arch	Green River (Colorado River)	40°54′52″N 109°25′17″W	1964
Vermont	Moore Dam	178	54	Embankment	Connecticut River	34°36′55″N 84°40′26″W	1957
Virginia	Bath County Pumped Storage Station Upper Dam	460	140	Embankment	Little Back Creek	38°13′32″N 79°49′27″W	1984
Washington	Mossyrock Dam	606	185	Concrete arch	Cowlitz River	46°32′04″N 122°25′34″W	1968
West Virginia	Summersville Dam	390	120	Rockfill	Gauley River	38°13′18″N 80°53′23″W	1966
Wisconsin	Hatfield Dam	95	29	Earthfill	Black River (Wisconsin)		1908
Wyoming	Buffalo Bill Dam	350	110	Concrete arch	Shoshone River	44°30′06″N 109°11′03″W	1910

== Location map ==
Locations of the ten tallest dams in the U.S.

== See also ==
- List of largest reservoirs in the United States
- List of world's tallest dams
