= Dent Bridge =

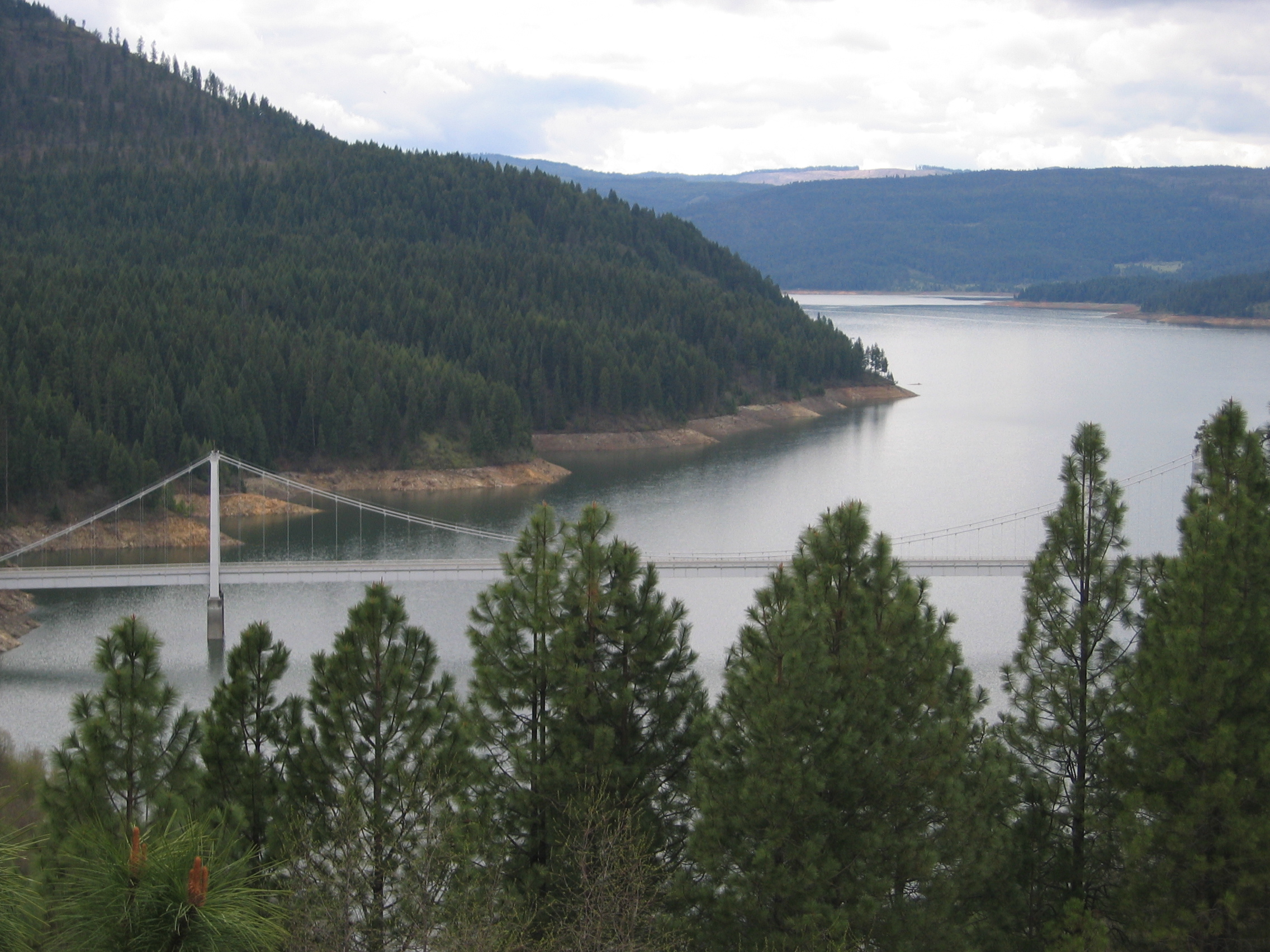
- 2007
- Coordinates: 46°36′09″N 116°10′41″W
- Crosses: Dworshak Reservoir
- Locale: Clearwater County, Idaho, U.S. (north of Orofino)
- Named for: Charles & Katherine Dent

Characteristics
- Total length: 1,550 feet (472 m)
- Longest span: 1,050 feet (320 m)

History
- Constructed by: U.S. Army; Corps of Engineers
- Construction end: 1971; 55 years ago
- Construction cost: $7.85 miilion ($62.4 million in 2025)

Location
- Interactive map of Dent Bridge

Location in the United States
Location in Idaho

The Dent Bridge is a suspension bridge in the northwest United States, located in north central Idaho in Clearwater County, north of Orofino. It is 17 miles (27 km) up the North Fork of the Clearwater River, now Dworshak Reservoir. Completed 55 years ago in 1971 at a cost of $7,848,950, the two-lane crossing has a main span of 1,050 feet (320 m), and an overall length of 1,550 feet (472 m).

== History ==
Built in conjunction with the Dworshak Dam by the U.S. Army Corps of Engineers during the early 1970s, this bridge provides local access over the flooded river, now Dworshak Reservoir. It replaced a smaller bridge which crossed the river prior to the flooding by the reservoir. Without the bridge, vehicle access from Ahsahka to the small community of Elk River would be blocked off. The Corps of Engineers carefully weighed the possibilities for getting traffic to Elk River from the Orofino side of the Clearwater River. Building a new road all the way around the 53-mile (85 km) long reservoir would not only be expensive, cutting into miles and miles of extremely rocky terrain, but would also be a painful inconvenience for travelers. The only reasonable answer was a bridge somewhere in the middle of the future reservoir. The exact location was based on the topography most suitable for road access as well as for the bridge construction itself.

The bridge takes its name from Charles and Katherine Dent, who in 1895 owned land on the western side of where the bridge now stands. The settlement of Dent was razed prior to being flooded by the reservoir.
