= Zuck Carlson =

American football player (1904–1986)

Profile
- Positions: Center, guard, linebacker

Personal information
- Born: November 12, 1904; Ahsahka, Idaho, U.S.
- Died: February 11, 1986 (aged 81); Park Ridge, Illinois, U.S.
- Listed height: 6 ft 0 in (1.83 m)
- Listed weight: 208 lb (94 kg)

Career information
- High school: The Dalles (The Dalles, Oregon)
- College: Oregon State

Career history
- Chicago Bears (1929–1936)

Awards and highlights
- 2× NFL champion (1932, 1933); First-team All-Pro (1932); Second-team All-Pro (1933, 1934); Oregon Sports Hall of Fame (1980); OSU Sports Hall of Fame (1994)
- Stats at Pro Football Reference

Jules Ed "Zuck" Carlson (November 12, 1904 – January 21, 1986) was an American professional football offensive lineman who played for the Chicago Bears from 1929 to 1936. He played in three title games, winning the championship twice in 1932 and 1933. He played college football for the Oregon State Beavers.

== Early life ==
Born November 12, 1904 in Ahsahka, Idaho, Carlson grew up in The Dalles, Oregon and attended The Dalles High School.

== Football career ==
Carlson played college football for the Oregon State Beavers. After college, he played for the Chicago Bears of the National Football League (NFL) from 1929 to 1936. Carlson played tackle, guard, and linebacker for the Bears. He played in 95 games for Chicago, including in the NFL's first indoor game, the first College All-Star Game, and first sanctioned championship game. He was named first-team All-Pro in 1932, and second-team All-Pro in 1933 and 1934. He won NFL championships with the Bears in 1932 and 1933.

In 2025, Carlson was named 83rd in the Chicago Tribune's ranking of the best 100 Chicago Bears players of all time.

Carlson was inducted into the Oregon Sports Hall of Fame in 1980 and the Oregon State University Sports Hall of Fame in 1994.

The Carlson Award, named in his honor, was established in 2024 and is given annually to the best high school offensive lineman in Oregon.

== Personal life and death ==
After retiring from football, Carlson taught industrial arts at Cooley Vocational High School in Chicago and worked for the Chicago Steamfitters Union as an instructor. He died February 11, 1986, aged 81, in Park Ridge, Illinois.
