= Bohemia Township =

Bohemia Township may refer to:

- Bohemia Township, Michigan
- Bohemia Township, Knox County, Nebraska
- Bohemia Township, Saunders County, Nebraska
