= List of largest reservoirs in the United States =

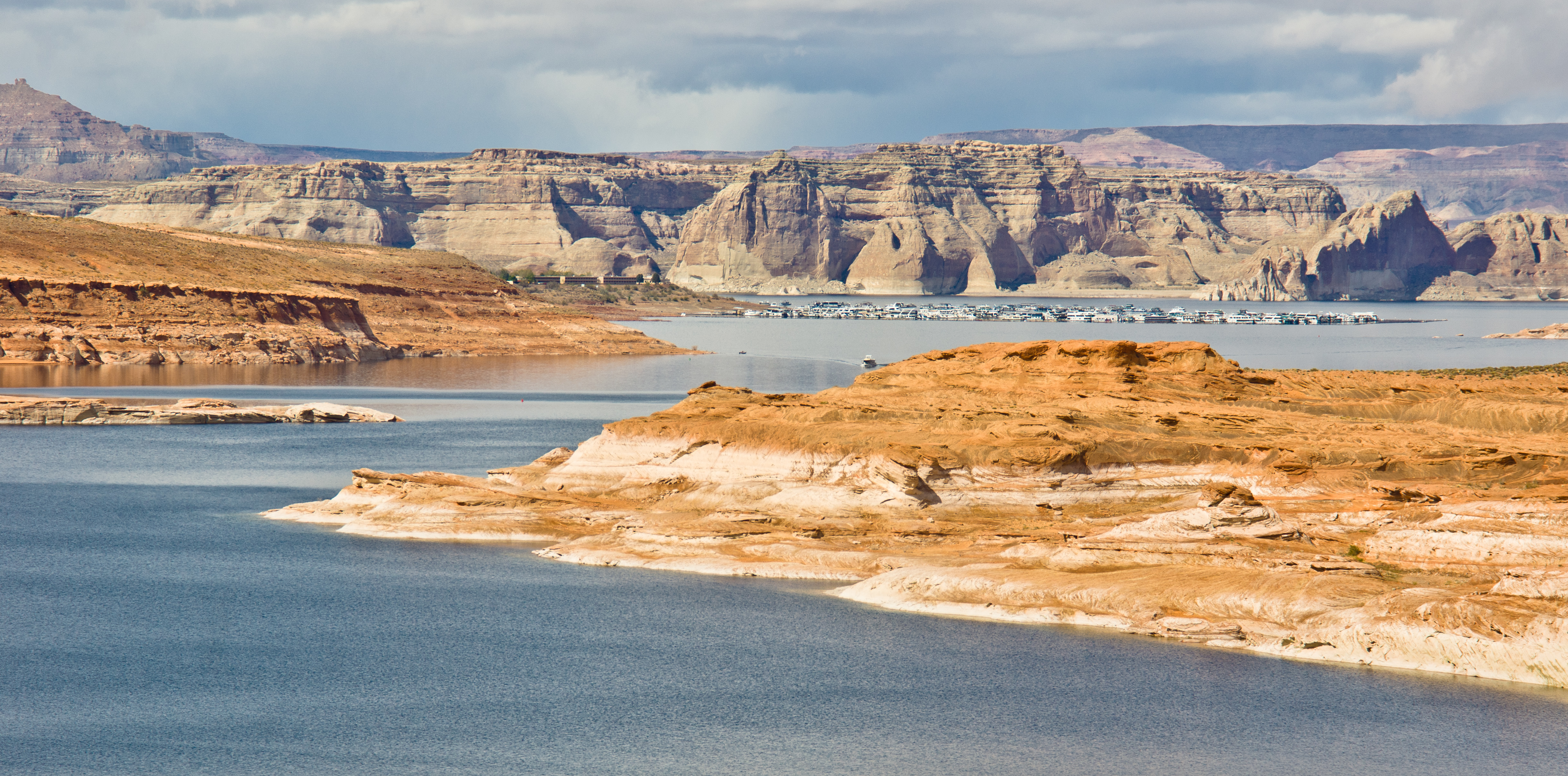
Lake Powell, impounded by Glen Canyon Dam, is the second-largest reservoir in the U.S.

This is a list of largest reservoirs in the United States, including all artificial lakes with a capacity greater than or equal to 1,000,000 acre-feet (1.2 km^{3}). Figures given are for maximum storage capacity (flood pool) of reservoirs, not regular storage volume (conservation pool). This difference is significant in reservoirs such as Kentucky Lake, whose full capacity is nearly three times that of its conservation pool.

Due to sedimentation and other factors that affect a reservoir's storage capacity over time, some data listed might not accurately reflect actual current conditions in certain reservoirs. For example, Lake Mead – the largest reservoir in the U.S. – could store more than 32.4 million acre-feet (40.1 km^{3}) when first filled, but sediment accumulation has reduced this to 28.9 million acre-feet (35.6 km^{3}).

== List ==
Key
† Reservoir is an existing lake raised by a dam; only the volume added by the dam is listed
Reservoir not entirely within the United States
N.F. = North Fork (ditto S.F., E.F., W.F.)

| Name | State(s) | Coordinates | Capacity | | Surface area | | Dam(s) | River | Year (Note: Year of initial dam completion) |
| | | | Acre-feet | km^{3} | Acres | Ha | | | |
|---|---|---|---|---|---|---|---|---|---|
| Abiquiu Lake | NM | 36°16′35″N 106°28′31″W | 1,192,801 | 1.471 | 12,430 | 5,030 | Abiquiu Dam | Rio Chama | 1963 |
| Alamo Lake | AZ | 34°17′47″N 113°32′43″W | 1,043,000 | 1.287 | 17,000 | 6,900 | Alamo Dam | Bill Williams River | 1968 |
| Allegheny Reservoir | NY; PA | 41°57′36″N 78°56′04″W | 1,300,000 | 1.604 | 21,180 | 8,570 | Kinzua Dam | Allegheny River | 1965 |
| American Falls Reservoir | ID | 42°54′29″N 112°45′04″W | 1,672,600 | 2.063 | 56,000 | 23,000 | American Falls Dam | Snake River | 1978 |
| Amistad Reservoir | COA; TX | 29°28′14″N 101°06′06″W | 5,658,600 | 6.980 | 64,900 | 26,300 | Amistad Dam | Rio Grande | 1969 |
| Arkabutla Lake | MS | 34°44′34″N 90°06′13″W | 1,383,800 | 1.707 | 30,000 | 12,000 | Arkabutla Dam | Coldwater River | 1943 |
| Banks Lake | WA | 47°47′54″N 119°12′01″W | 1,275,000 | 1.573 | 26,900 | 10,900 | Dry Falls Dam, North Dam | Grand Coulee‡ | 1949 |
| Beaver Lake | AR | 36°21′17″N 93°55′28″W | 1,950,000 | 2.405 | 31,700 | 12,800 | Beaver Dam | White River | 1966 |
| Belton Lake | TX | 31°08′00″N 97°30′30″W | 1,876,700 | 2.315 | 37,340 | 15,110 | Belton Dam | Leon River | 1954 |
| Bighorn Lake | MT; WY | 45°06′22″N 108°11′13″W | 1,381,189 | 1.704 | 17,300 | 7,000 | Yellowtail Dam | Bighorn River | 1967 |
| Broken Bow Lake | OK | 34°12′32″N 94°41′00″W | 1,368,230 | 1.688 | 18,000 | 7,300 | Broken Bow Dam | Mountain Fork | 1968 |
| Brownlee Reservoir | ID; OR | 44°35′34″N 117°07′31″W | 1,426,700 | 1.760 | 15,000 | 6,100 | Brownlee Dam | Snake River | 1958 |
| Bull Shoals Lake | AR; MO | 36°29′52″N 92°45′58″W | 5,760,000 | 7.105 | 71,240 | 28,830 | Bull Shoals Dam | White River | 1951 |
| Canyon Ferry Lake | MT | 46°31′15″N 111°34′22″W | 1,997,900 | 2.464 | 35,181 | 14,237 | Canyon Ferry Dam | Missouri River | 1954 |
| Cedar Creek Reservoir | TX | 32°16′08″N 96°08′23″W | 1,085,000 | 1.338 | 34,000 | 14,000 | Joe B. Hogsett Dam | Cedar Creek | 1965 |
| Center Hill Lake | TN | 36°01′42″N 85°45′17″W | 2,092,000 | 2.580 | 18,220 | 7,370 | Center Hill Dam | Caney Fork | 1948 |
| Cherokee Lake | TN | 36°15′57″N 83°22′17″W | 1,541,000 | 1.901 | 28,780 | 11,650 | Cherokee Dam | Holston River | 1941 |
| Dale Hollow Reservoir | KY; TN | 36°36′41″N 85°18′40″W | 1,706,000 | 2.104 | 27,700 | 11,200 | Dale Hollow Dam | Obey River | 1943 |
| DeGray Lake | AR | 34°14′36″N 93°11′29″W | 1,377,100 | 1.699 | 18,000 | 7,300 | DeGray Dam | Caddo River | 1972 |
| Don Pedro Reservoir | CA | 37°46′46″N 120°21′43″W | 2,030,000 | 2.504 | 12,960 | 5,240 | New Don Pedro Dam | Tuolumne River | 1971 |
| Douglas Lake | TN | 35°59′33″N 83°22′20″W | 1,461,000 | 1.802 | 28,420 | 11,500 | Douglas Dam | French Broad River | 1943 |
| Dworshak Reservoir | ID | 46°36′38″N 116°06′27″W | 3,469,900 | 4.280 | 16,418 | 6,644 | Dworshak Dam | N.F. Clearwater River | 1973 |
| Elephant Butte Lake | NM | 33°18′35″N 107°09′58″W | 2,065,010 | 2.547 | 35,984 | 14,562 | Elephant Butte Dam | Rio Grande | 1916 |
| Enid Lake | MS | 34°09′05″N 89°48′32″W | 1,213,500 | 1.497 | 28,000 | 11,000 | Enid Dam | Yocona River | 1952 |
| Eufaula Lake | OK | 35°17′19″N 95°32′33″W | 3,798,000 | 4.685 | 105,000 | 42,000 | Eufaula Dam | Canadian River | 1964 |
| Falcon Lake | TAM; TX | 26°44′20″N 99°13′48″W | 2,645,646 | 3.263 | 87,400 | 35,400 | Falcon Dam | Rio Grande | 1954 |
| Falls Lake | NC | 36°01′16″N 78°42′46″W | 1,020,980 | 1.259 | 12,410 | 5,020 | Falls Dam | Neuse River | 1981 |
| Flathead Lake† | MT | 47°54′05″N 114°06′09″W | 1,217,000 | 1.501 | 126,000 | 51,000 | SKQ Dam | Flathead River | 1939 |
| Flaming Gorge Reservoir | UT; WY | 41°05′37″N 109°32′40″W | 3,788,700 | 4.673 | 42,020 | 17,000 | Flaming Gorge Dam | Green River | 1964 |
| Fort Gibson Lake | OK | 35°57′10″N 95°16′24″W | 1,292,000 | 1.594 | 19,900 | 8,100 | Fort Gibson Dam | Neosho River | 1949 |
| Fort Peck Lake | MT | 47°45′23″N 106°43′28″W | 19,100,000 | 23.560 | 245,000 | 99,000 | Fort Peck Dam | Missouri River | 1940 |
| Fontana Lake | NC | 35°26′13″N 83°40′44″W | 1,443,000 | 1.780 | 10,240 | 4,140 | Fontana Dam | Little Tennessee River | 1944 |
| F.D. Roosevelt Lake | WA | 48°19′53″N 118°10′27″W | 9,562,000 | 11.795 | 80,000 | 32,000 | Grand Coulee Dam | Columbia River | 1942 |
| Grand Lake o' the Cherokees | OK | 36°36′49″N 94°50′54″W | 1,672,000 | 2.062 | 46,500 | 18,800 | Pensacola Dam | Neosho River | 1940 |
| Greers Ferry Lake | AR | 35°31′25″N 92°07′21″W | 2,844,000 | 3.508 | 40,500 | 16,400 | Greers Ferry Dam | Little Red River | 1962 |
| Grenada Lake | MS | 33°49′54″N 89°43′42″W | 2,722,100 | 3.358 | 35,820 | 14,500 | Grenada Dam | Yalobusha River | 1954 |
| Guntersville Lake | AL | 34°30′38″N 86°09′33″W | 1,018,700 | 1.257 | 67,900 | 27,500 | Guntersville Dam | Tennessee River | 1939 |
| Hugo Lake | OK | 34°03′52″N 95°24′56″W | 1,274,110 | 1.572 | 35,045 | 14,182 | Hugo Lake Dam | Kiamichi River | 1974 |
| Hungry Horse Reservoir | MT | 48°13′32″N 113°47′56″W | 3,467,179 | 4.277 | 23,813 | 9,637 | Hungry Horse Dam | S.F. Flathead River | 1953 |
| John H. Kerr Reservoir | NC; VA | 36°34′23″N 78°29′10″W | 3,363,500 | 4.149 | 83,200 | 33,700 | John H. Kerr Dam | Roanoke River | 1953 |
| Jordan Lake | NC | 35°44′35″N 79°01′36″W | 1,646,560 | 2.031 | 31,800 | 12,900 | B. Everett Jordan Dam | Haw River | 1983 |
| Kaw Lake | OK | 36°46′14″N 96°49′43″W | 1,070,310 | 1.320 | 38,000 | 15,000 | Kaw Dam | Arkansas River | 1976 |
| Kentucky Lake | KY; TN | 36°31′26″N 88°02′13″W | 6,129,000 | 7.560 | 160,300 | 64,900 | Kentucky Dam | Tennessee River | 1944 |
| Keystone Lake | OK | 36°13′50″N 96°17′50″W | 1,737,600 | 2.143 | 54,320 | 21,980 | Keystone Dam | Arkansas River | 1964 |
| Lake Almanor | CA | 40°15′21″N 121°10′08″W | 1,308,000 | 1.613 | 28,160 | 11,400 | Canyon Dam | N.F. Feather River | 1910 |
| Lake Barkley | KY; TN | 36°52′14″N 87°59′12″W | 2,082,000 | 2.568 | 57,920 | 23,440 | Barkley Dam | Cumberland River | 1966 |
| Lake Berryessa | CA | 38°35′25″N 122°13′32″W | 1,602,000 | 1.976 | 20,700 | 8,400 | Monticello Dam | Putah Creek | 1957 |
| Lake Cumberland | KY | 36°55′05″N 85°00′58″W | 6,089,000 | 7.511 | 65,530 | 26,520 | Wolf Creek Dam | Cumberland River | 1951 |
| Lake Elwell | MT | 48°20′43″N 111°15′10″W | 1,515,000 | 1.869 | 14,842 | 6,006 | Tiber Dam | Marias River | 1956 |
| Lake Francis Case | SD | 43°26′31″N 99°12′33″W | 5,700,000 | 7.031 | 102,000 | 41,000 | Fort Randall Dam | Missouri River | 1956 |
| Lake Hartwell | GA; SC | 34°29′44″N 82°49′14″W | 3,438,700 | 4.242 | 55,950 | 22,640 | Hartwell Dam | Savannah River | 1962 |
| Lake Jocassee | NC; SC | 34°58′52″N 82°56′17″W | 1,185,000 | 1.462 | 7,565 | 3,061 | Jocassee Dam | Keowee River | 1975 |
| Lake Kemp | TX | 33°45′20″N 99°08′52″W | 1,040,000 | 1.283 | 16,640 | 6,730 | Lake Kemp Dam | Wichita River | 1923 |
| Lake Koocanusa | BC; MT | 48°49′03″N 115°16′41″W | 5,869,200 | 7.240 | 46,700 | 18,900 | Libby Dam | Kootenai River | 1975 |
| Lake Lanier | GA | 34°14′08″N 83°57′09″W | 2,554,000 | 3.150 | 47,182 | 19,094 | Buford Dam | Chattahoochee River | 1956 |
| Lake Livingston | TX | 30°44′39″N 95°08′02″W | 2,135,324 | 2.634 | 91,000 | 37,000 | Livingston Dam | Trinity River | 1969 |
| Lake Marion | SC | 33°27′23″N 80°19′45″W | 1,230,000 | 1.517 | 110,000 | 45,000 | Santee Dam | Santee River | 1942 |
| Lake Martin | AL | 32°51′41″N 85°53′26″W | 1,622,000 | 2.001 | 44,000 | 18,000 | Martin Dam | Tallapoosa River | 1927 |
| Lake McClure | CA | 37°38′22″N 120°16′50″W | 1,032,000 | 1.273 | 7,147 | 2,892 | New Exchequer Dam | Merced River | 1967 |
| Lake McConaughy | NE | 41°15′38″N 101°50′38″W | 1,740,000 | 2.146 | 35,700 | 14,400 | Kingsley Dam | N. Platte River | 1941 |
| Lake Mead | AZ; NV | 36°08′28″N 114°25′46″W | 28,945,000 | 35.703 | 161,000 | 65,000 | Hoover Dam | Colorado River | 1936 |
| Lake Meredith | TX | 35°38′14″N 101°39′32″W | 2,434,220 | 3.003 | 21,640 | 8,760 | Sanford Dam | Canadian River | 1965 |
| Lake Mohave | AZ; NV | 35°24′37″N 114°38′12″W | 1,818,300 | 2.243 | 26,500 | 10,700 | Davis Dam | Colorado River | 1951 |
| Lake Moultrie | SC | 33°18′23″N 80°03′21″W | 1,110,000 | 1.369 | 60,000 | 24,000 | Pinopolis Dam | Cooper River | 1942 |
| Lake Murray | SC | 34°03′52″N 81°22′07″W | 2,200,000 | 2.714 | 50,000 | 20,000 | Saluda Dam | Saluda River | 1930 |
| Lake Norman | NC | 35°31′52″N 80°56′32″W | 1,093,600 | 1.349 | 32,510 | 13,160 | Cowans Ford Dam | Catawba River | 1964 |
| Lake Oahe | ND; SD | 45°17′53″N 100°18′08″W | 23,500,000 | 28.987 | 370,000 | 150,000 | Oahe Dam | Missouri River | 1962 |
| Lake of the Ozarks | MO | 38°09′40″N 92°47′44″W | 1,990,000 | 2.455 | 55,000 | 22,000 | Bagnell Dam | Osage River | 1931 |
| Lake Oroville | CA | 39°34′15″N 121°27′49″W | 3,537,577 | 4.364 | 15,805 | 6,396 | Oroville Dam | Feather River | 1968 |
| Lake Ouachita | AR | 34°35′46″N 93°18′58″W | 2,768,000 | 3.414 | 48,300 | 19,500 | Blakely Mountain Dam | Ouachita River | 1952 |
| Lake Pend Oreille† | ID | 48°08′58″N 116°23′03″W | 1,153,000 | 1.422 | 94,700 | 38,300 | Albeni Falls Dam | Pend Oreille River | 1951 |
| Lake Pleasant | AZ | 33°53′22″N 112°16′52″W | 1,108,600 | 1.367 | 12,040 | 4,870 | New Waddell Dam | Agua Fria River | 1994 |
| Lake Powell | AZ; UT | 37°19′15″N 110°47′37″W | 26,214,900 | 32.336 | 163,000 | 66,000 | Glen Canyon Dam | Colorado River | 1966 |
| Lake Ray Roberts | TX | 33°24′28″N 97°01′30″W | 1,931,900 | 2.383 | 29,350 | 11,880 | Ray Roberts Dam | Elm Fork Trinity River | 1986 |
| Lake Red Rock | IA | 41°25′49″N 93°09′30″W | 1,436,000 | 1.771 | 64,480 | 26,090 | Red Rock Dam | Des Moines River | 1969 |
| Lake Sakakawea | ND | 47°45′57″N 102°17′17″W | 24,300,000 | 29.974 | 382,000 | 155,000 | Garrison Dam | Missouri River | 1953 |
| Lake Sharpe | SD | 44°11′24″N 99°40′54″W | 1,910,000 | 2.356 | 56,884 | 23,020 | Big Bend Dam | Missouri River | 1966 |
| Lake Shelbyville | IL | 39°28′18″N 88°42′50″W | 1,143,000 | 1.410 | 11,100 | 4,500 | Shelbyville Dam | Kaskaskia River | 1970 |
| Lake Strom Thurmond | GA; SC | 33°48′48″N 82°19′01″W | 3,820,000 | 4.712 | 71,100 | 28,800 | J. Strom Thurmond Dam | Savannah River | 1954 |
| Lake Tawakoni | TX | 32°48′29″N 95°55′14″W | 1,660,000 | 2.048 | 35,840 | 14,500 | Iron Bridge Dam | Sabine River | 1960 |
| Lake Texoma | OK; TX | 33°54′39″N 96°39′06″W | 4,997,079 | 6.164 | 89,000 | 36,000 | Denison Dam | Red River | 1943 |
| Lake Travis | TX | 30°24′51″N 97°59′28″W | 1,134,956 | 1.400 | 19,297 | 7,809 | Mansfield Dam | Colorado River (Texas) | 1942 |
| Lake Umatilla | OR; WA | 45°47′25″N 120°03′22″W | 2,530,000 | 3.121 | 55,000 | 22,000 | John Day Dam | Columbia River | 1971 |
| Lake Wallula | OR; WA | 46°03′28″N 118°56′31″W | 1,350,000 | 1.665 | 38,800 | 15,700 | McNary Dam | Columbia River | 1954 |
| Lake Winnibigoshish† | MN | 47°26′16″N 94°11′40″W | 1,072,000 | 1.322 | 67,800 | 27,400 | Winnibigoshish Lake Dam | Mississippi River | 1884 |
| Leech Lake† | MN | 47°09′48″N 94°24′37″W | 1,000,000 | 1.233 | 102,948 | 41,662 | Leech Lake Dam | Leech Lake River | 1885 |
| Lewis Smith Lake | AL | 33°57′24″N 87°06′36″W | 1,390,000 | 1.715 | 21,200 | 8,600 | Smith Lake Dam | Sipsey Fork | 1961 |
| Lewisville Lake | TX | 33°06′34″N 96°58′17″W | 2,082,800 | 2.569 | 23,040 | 9,320 | Lewisville Dam | Elm Fork Trinity River | 1955 |
| Mark Twain Lake | MO | 39°39′16″N 91°45′13″W | 2,103,120 | 2.594 | 53,200 | 21,500 | Clarence Cannon Dam | Salt River (Missouri) | 1983 |
| Milford Lake | KS | 39°09′39″N 96°55′12″W | 1,125,200 | 1.388 | 33,000 | 13,000 | Milford Dam | Republican River | 1967 |
| Millwood Lake | AR | 33°44′47″N 93°58′59″W | 1,854,930 | 2.288 | 29,200 | 11,800 | Millwood Dam | Little River (Red River) | 1966 |
| Navajo Lake | CO; NM | 36°53′47″N 107°27′48″W | 1,708,600 | 2.108 | 15,610 | 6,320 | Navajo Dam | San Juan River | 1962 |
| New Melones Lake | CA | 37°59′32″N 120°31′46″W | 2,420,000 | 2.985 | 12,500 | 5,100 | New Melones Dam | Stanislaus River | 1979 |
| Norfork Lake | AR; MO | 36°21′33″N 92°14′01″W | 1,983,000 | 2.446 | 22,000 | 8,900 | Norfork Dam | North Fork River | 1944 |
| Norris Lake | TN | 36°17′25″N 83°55′02″W | 2,040,000 | 2.516 | 34,200 | 13,800 | Norris Dam | Clinch River | 1936 |
| Oologah Lake | OK | 35°32′57″N 95°36′13″W | 1,519,000 | 1.874 | 56,800 | 23,000 | Oologah Dam | Verdigris River | 1963 |
| Owyhee Reservoir | OR | 43°27′41″N 117°20′13″W | 1,183,300 | 1.460 | 13,500 | 5,500 | Owyhee Dam | Owyhee River | 1932 |
| Painted Rock Reservoir | AZ | 33°01′37″N 112°52′00″W | 2,491,700 | 3.073 | 53,200 | 21,500 | Painted Rock Dam | Gila River | 1960 |
| Palisades Reservoir | ID; WY | 43°14′31″N 111°07′11″W | 1,401,000 | 1.728 | 16,000 | 6,500 | Palisades Dam | Snake River | 1957 |
| Pathfinder Reservoir | WY | 42°25′17″N 106°54′48″W | 1,016,500 | 1.254 | 22,000 | 8,900 | Pathfinder Dam | N. Platte River | 1909 |
| Perry Lake | KS | 39°10′44″N 95°27′29″W | 1,417,683 | 1.749 | 25,389 | 10,275 | Perry Dam | Delaware River (Kansas) | 1966 |
| Pine Flat Lake | CA | 36°51′39″N 119°17′55″W | 1,000,000 | 1.233 | 5,970 | 2,420 | Pine Flat Dam | Kings River | 1954 |
| Quabbin Reservoir | MA | 42°21′39″N 72°18′06″W | 1,274,000 | 1.571 | 24,529 | 9,927 | Winsor Dam, Goodnough Dike | Swift River | 1939 |
| Red Lake Reservoir† | MN | 48°04′24″N 95°01′44″W | 3,428,000 | 4.228 | 288,640 | 116,810 | Lower Red Lake Dam | Red Lake River | 1931 |
| Richard B. Russell Lake | GA; SC | 34°05′09″N 82°38′34″W | 1,488,170 | 1.836 | 26,650 | 10,780 | Richard B. Russell Dam | Savannah River | 1985 |
| Richland-Chambers Reservoir | TX | 31°58′46″N 96°11′29″W | 1,743,000 | 2.150 | 44,752 | 18,110 | Richland Creek Dam | Richland Creek | 1987 |
| Riffe Lake | WA | 46°28′44″N 122°17′41″W | 1,685,000 | 2.078 | 11,830 | 4,790 | Mossyrock Dam | Cowlitz River | 1968 |
| Ross Lake | BC; WA | 48°51′04″N 121°01′31″W | 1,435,000 | 1.770 | 11,700 | 4,700 | Ross Dam | Skagit River | 1949 |
| Sam Rayburn Reservoir | TX | 31°12′37″N 94°17′04″W | 3,997,600 | 4.931 | 114,500 | 46,300 | Sam Rayburn Dam | Angelina River | 1965 |
| San Luis Reservoir | CA | 37°03′22″N 121°07′12″W | 2,041,000 | 2.518 | 12,700 | 5,100 | San Luis Dam | San Luis Creek‡ | 1967 |
| Sardis Lake | MS | 34°29′16″N 89°38′37″W | 1,512,000 | 1.865 | 58,500 | 23,700 | Sardis Dam | Little Tallahatchie River | 1940 |
| Seminoe Reservoir | WY | 42°02′07″N 106°50′56″W | 1,017,279 | 1.255 | 20,291 | 8,211 | Seminoe Dam | N. Platte River | 1939 |
| Shasta Lake | CA | 40°46′29″N 122°18′01″W | 4,552,000 | 5.615 | 29,740 | 12,040 | Shasta Dam | Sacramento River | 1945 |
| Smith Mountain Lake | VA | 37°04′48″N 79°37′15″W | 2,300,000 | 2.837 | 20,600 | 8,300 | Smith Mountain Dam | Roanoke River | 1963 |
| Stockton Lake | MO | 37°36′43″N 93°46′16″W | 1,674,000 | 2.065 | 63,200 | 25,600 | Stockton Dam | Sac River | 1969 |
| Strawberry Reservoir | UT | 40°09′55″N 111°07′32″W | 1,106,500 | 1.365 | 17,163 | 6,946 | Soldier Creek Dam | Strawberry River | 1974 |
| Table Rock Lake | AR; MO | 36°37′18″N 93°24′28″W | 3,462,000 | 4.270 | 52,300 | 21,200 | Table Rock Dam | White River | 1958 |
| Tenkiller Ferry Lake | OK | 35°40′02″N 94°58′55″W | 1,230,800 | 1.518 | 20,800 | 8,400 | Tenkiller Ferry Dam | Illinois River (Arkansas) | 1952 |
| Theodore Roosevelt Lake | AZ | 33°40′55″N 111°06′49″W | 2,910,200 | 3.590 | 31,900 | 12,900 | Theodore Roosevelt Dam | Salt River | 1911 |
| Toledo Bend Reservoir | LA; TX | 31°29′18″N 93°43′43″W | 4,472,900 | 5.517 | 181,600 | 73,500 | Toledo Bend Dam | Sabine River | 1966 |
| Truman Reservoir | MO | 38°15′26″N 93°26′18″W | 5,187,000 | 6.398 | 209,300 | 84,700 | Harry S. Truman Dam | Osage River | 1979 |
| Trinity Lake | CA | 40°53′00″N 122°42′26″W | 2,447,650 | 3.019 | 16,535 | 6,691 | Trinity Dam | Trinity River (California) | 1962 |
| Tuttle Creek Lake | KS | 39°21′15″N 96°40′36″W | 3,185,700 | 3.930 | 53,760 | 21,760 | Tuttle Creek Dam | Big Blue River | 1962 |
| Walter F. George Lake | AL; GA | 31°37′10″N 85°4′15″W | 1,205,400 | 1.487 | 45,181 | 18,284 | Walter F. George Dam | Chattahoochee River | 1963 |
| Wappapello Lake | MO | 36°56′50″N 90°18′45″W | 1,134,600 | 1.400 | 23,200 | 9,400 | Wappapello Dam | St. Francis River | 1941 |
| Watts Bar Lake | TN | 36°46′20″N 84°40′10″W | 1,175,000 | 1.449 | 39,000 | 16,000 | Watts Bar Dam | Tennessee River | 1942 |
| Weiss Lake | AL | 34°11′02″N 85°36′12″W | 1,433,300 | 1.768 | 30,200 | 12,200 | Weiss Dam | Coosa River | 1961 |
| Wheeler Lake | AL | 34°42′44″N 87°08′26″W | 1,050,000 | 1.295 | 67,100 | 27,200 | Wheeler Dam | Tennessee River | 1936 |
| Lake Whitney | TX | 32°51′12″N 96°31′14″W | 2,100,400 | 2.591 | 60,000 | 24,000 | Whitney Lake Dam | Brazos River | 1951 |
| Wright Patman Lake | TX | 33°16′27″N 94°13′02″W | 2,654,300 | 3.274 | 119,700 | 48,400 | Wright Patman Dam | Sulphur River | 1953 |

== Location map ==
Locations of the 25 largest reservoirs in the U.S.

== See also ==
- List of reservoirs by volume
