= Jan Nowopacký =

Czech painter (1821–1908)

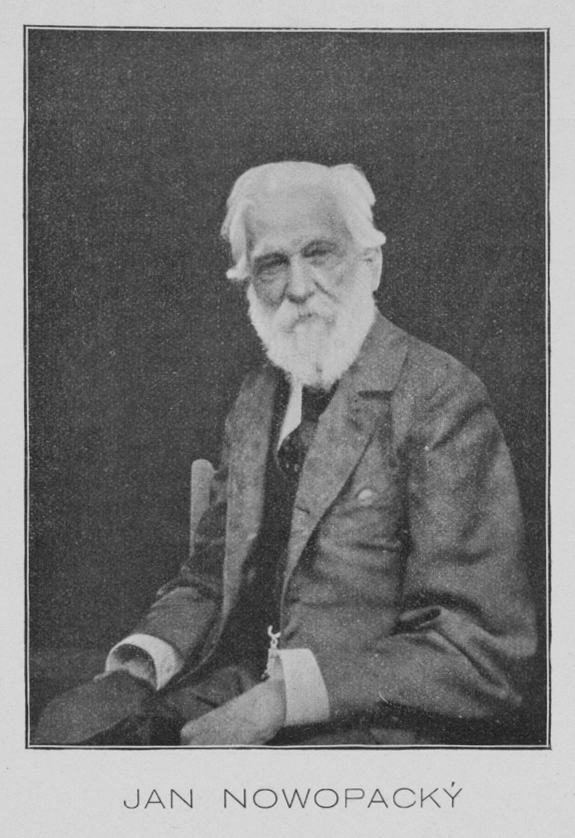
Jan Nowopacký (1902)

Jan Nowopacký or Jan Novopacký (German: Johann Novopacky; 15 November 1821 – 3 August 1908) was a Czech landscape painter.

== Biography ==
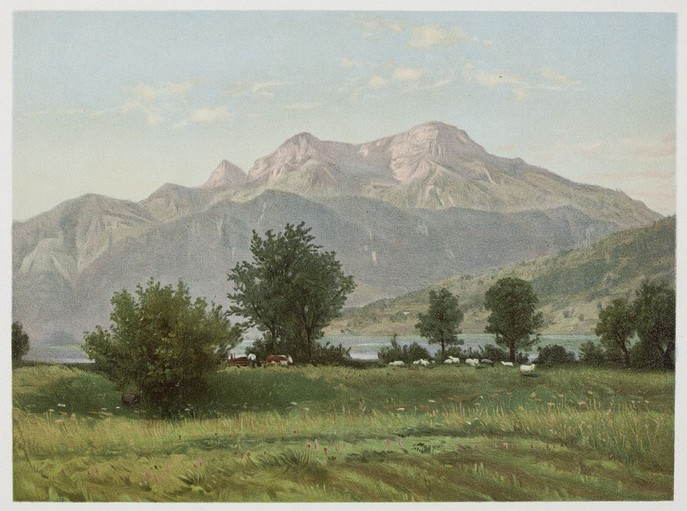
The Schatzberg

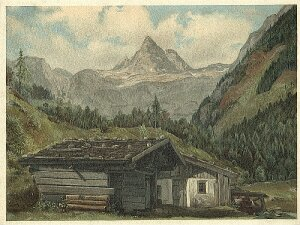
Blacksmith's Shop in Lofer

Nowopacký was born on 15 November 1821 in Nechanice. He was born to a poor family of weavers. He showed creative talent at an early age, playing the flute and violin as well as painting, so his family sought a way to arrange a good education for him. They finally obtained the patronage of Countess von Harrach, who took him to Vienna to study with the portrait painter, Franz Schrotzberg.

After a few lessons, he attempted to gain admission to the Academy of Fine Arts, but was rejected because he did not speak German well enough. He went home to Nechanice, studied hard, reapplied, and was admitted in 1842. From there, he made several study trips to the Alps and Tyrolia. In 1848, he was a participant in the Revolutions and, fearing reprisals, returned to Prague when they failed.

Following his father's death, his financial situation became difficult and he accepted a job as a drawing teacher for the Paars, a notable family that was instrumental in establishing the Austro-Hungarian Postal Service. After two years, in 1851, he took a similar position with the Count of Hoyos in Lower Austria. His duties there involved travelling in Northern Italy and Campania.

He returned to Vienna in 1861, where he continued to be an art instructor for noble families. After 1869, he was engaged by the Imperial Family and taught painting to Crown Prince Rudolf. As a result, in 1880, he was appointed Custodian of the Imperial Galleries, a position he held until his retirement in 1895, when he returned to Bohemia to live with his niece in Ústí nad Orlicí.

He spent so many years in Vienna that he became considered to be an Austrian painter. His first major exhibition in his homeland did not come until 1902. He died on 3 August 1908 in Slavětín.
