= Jocassee Dam =

- Interactive map of Jocassee Dam
- Country: United States
- Location: Pickens/Oconee Counties, South Carolina
- Coordinates: 34°57′36″N 82°55′10″W
- Opening date: 1973
- Owner: Duke Energy

Dam and spillways
- Type of dam: Embankment
- Impounds: Keowee River
- Height: 385 ft (117 m)
- Length: 1,800 ft (550 m)

Reservoir
- Creates: Lake Jocassee
- Total capacity: 1,185,000 acre⋅ft (1.462 km^{3})
- Catchment area: 148 mi^{2} (380 km^{2})

Power Station
- Commission date: 1973–1975
- Turbines: 4
- Installed capacity: 710 MW (950,000 hp)
- Annual generation: 811 GWh (2,920 TJ)

Jocassee Dam (often called Lake Jocassee Dam) is an embankment dam on the Keowee River, straddling the border of Pickens and Oconee counties in South Carolina in the United States. The dam forms Lake Jocassee, which is fed by the Toxaway, Thompson, Horsepasture and Whitewater Rivers, and serves primarily for hydroelectric power generation and flood control. The dam and reservoir are part of the Keowee-Toxaway Hydroelectric Project, owned and operated by Duke Energy.

Completed in 1973, the dam is a zoned earth and rock fill structure, standing 385 feet (117 m) high with a crest length of 1,800 feet (550 m). At full pool, the reservoir has a storage capacity of 1,185,000 acre-feet (1.462×10^{9} m^{3}), encompassing 75 miles (121 km) of shoreline and 7,500 acres (3,000 ha). Floodwater is released through a spillway controlled by two 40-by-32-foot (12.2 m × 9.8 m) gates, with a capacity of 45,700 cubic feet per second (1,290 m^{3}/s).

The dam supports a 710 megawatts (950,000 hp) hydroelectric station, generating power from four turbines. Two of the turbines were installed in 1973, while the third and fourth units came online in 1975. The power station functions as a pumped-storage operation designed to provide peaking power, and generates an average of 811 million kilowatt-hours (2.92×10^{9} MJ) per year. The dam is shown under construction in the 1972 thriller film Deliverance.

== See also ==
- List of largest reservoirs in the United States
- List of the tallest dams in the United States
