= Dworshak National Fish Hatchery =

Mitigation hatchery in Idaho, U.S.

Coordinates: 46°30′08″N 116°19′30″W

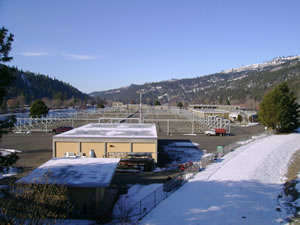
Dworshak National Fish Hatchery

Dworshak National Fish Hatchery is a mitigation hatchery located on the Clearwater River within the Nez Perce Reservation near Ahsahka, in north-central Idaho, United States. It was constructed in 1969 by the Army Corps of Engineers, and is co-managed by the U.S. Fish and Wildlife Service and the Nez Perce Tribe. The hatchery is one of the largest combination producers of anadromous (migratory) fish in the world. These fish make a 1000-mile round trip to the ocean and back to spawn in the Clearwater River. The Dworshak Dam blocks access to the historical spawning areas on the North Fork-Clearwater River for the steelhead, and it is too high for a fish ladder.

Steelhead, chinook and coho salmon are spawned and reared at the facility. The hatchery attempts to mitigate or make up for some of the lost spawning area by collecting mature adult fish, fertilizing their eggs, and raising them for 1–1½ years, until they are large enough to begin their 500-mile journey to the Pacific Ocean. The young fish must survive a variety of hazards in the long journey, including swimming past eight dams on the Snake and Columbia Rivers. During the summer months the dams increase their water releases to aid fish migration downstream.

The Dworshak hatchery is unique because of its ability to control the water temperature in the steelhead rearing ponds. By keeping the temperature at 54 degrees Fahrenheit, the juvenile steelheads are able to be released after one year at a length of 8 inches. In cold water, it would take an additional year to grow those same 8 inches. The hatchery accomplishes this through the recirculation of up to 90 percent of its water.

The hatchery is part of Dworshak Fisheries Complex, which also includes Kooskia National Fish Hatchery, the Idaho Fish Health Center, and the Idaho Fisheries Resource Office.

Dworshak National Fish Hatchery is open to visitors during daylight hours. The facility has a self-guided tour route and offers pre-arranged guided tours. The hatchery is located approximately three miles west of Orofino, ID on Highway 7.

The best fish viewing seasons are: February - April for adult steelhead, June - August for adult chinook, and October - December for coho and steelhead.

Dworshak Dam and Hatchery were named after Henry Dworshak, a Republican Senator from Idaho during 1946–1962.
