= Nechanice =

- Town
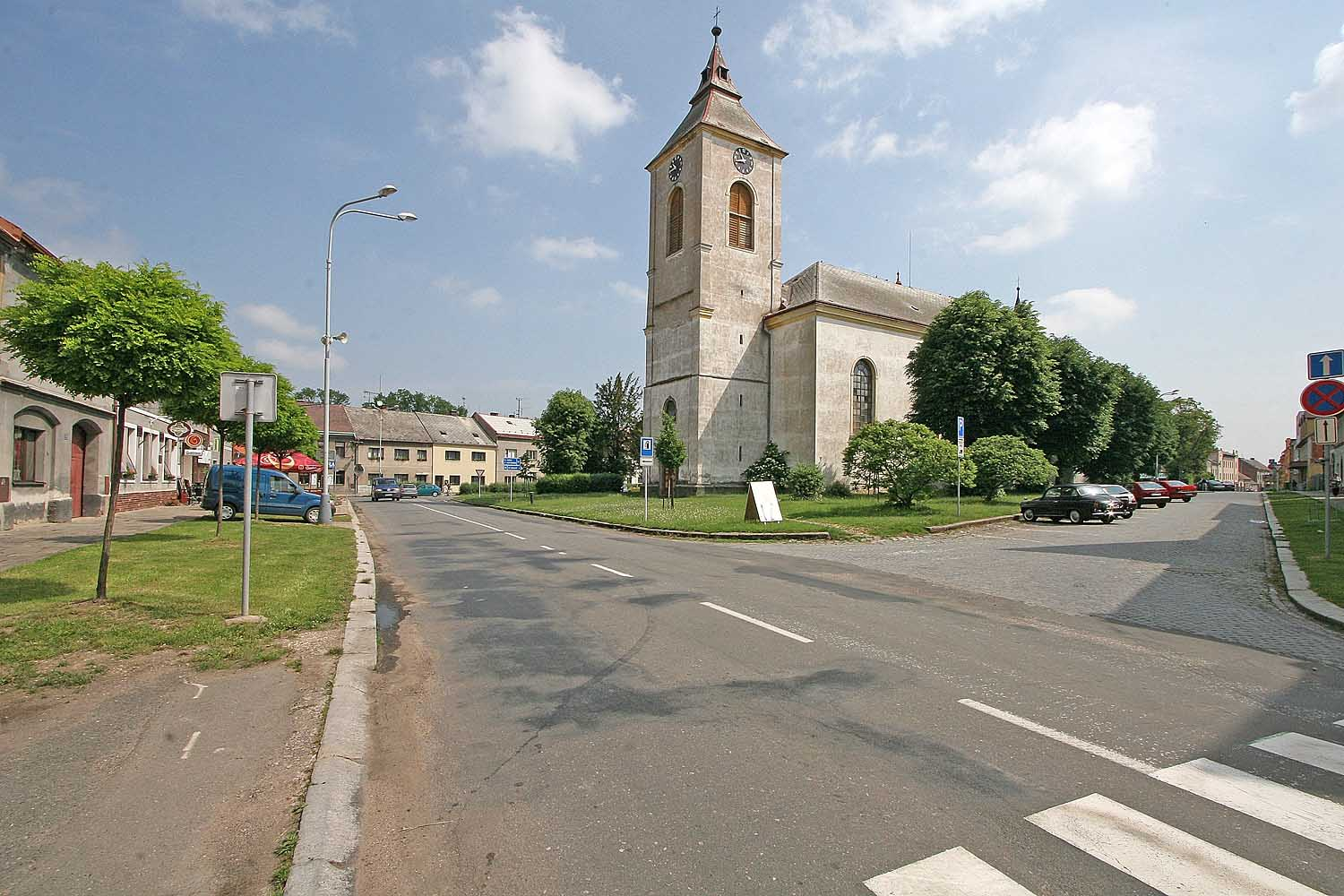
- Church of the Assumption of the Virgin Mary

- Flag Coat of arms

- Location in the Czech Republic
- Coordinates: 50°14′18″N 15°37′51″E
- Country: Czech Republic
- Region: Hradec Králové
- District: Hradec Králové
- First mentioned: 1228

Government
  - Mayor: Adam Berger

Area
  - Total: 27.99 km^{2} (10.81 sq mi)
- Elevation: 239 m (784 ft)

Population (2026-01-01)
  - Total: 2,545
  - Density: 90.93/km^{2} (235.5/sq mi)
- Time zone: UTC+1 (CET)
  - Summer (DST): UTC+2 (CEST)
- Postal code: 503 15
- Website: www.nechanice.cz

Nechanice (Czech pronunciation: [ˈnɛxaɲɪtsɛ]; German: Nechanitz) is a town in Hradec Králové District in the Hradec Králové Region of the Czech Republic. It has about 2,500 inhabitants.

== Administrative division ==
Nechanice consists of eight municipal parts (in brackets population according to the 2021 census):

- Nechanice (1,361)
- Komárov (27)
- Lubno (202)
- Nerošov (38)
- Sobětuš (72)
- Staré Nechanice (357)
- Suchá (192)
- Tůně (142)

== Etymology ==
The name is derived from the personal name Nechan, meaning "the village of Nechan's people".

== Geography ==
Nechanice is located about 13 kilometres (8 mi) west of Hradec Králové. It lies in the East Elbe Table. The highest point is the hill Jedlický vrch at 302 m (991 ft) above sea level.

== History ==
The first written mention of Nechanice is from 1228. In 1867, it was promoted to a town. Nechanice lost the town status in 1949, but it was restored in 1992.

== Demographics ==
Historical population

Year	Pop.	±%
1869	3,992	—
1880	3,750	−6.1%
1890	3,507	−6.5%
1900	3,930	+12.1%
1910	3,933	+0.1%

Year	Pop.	±%
1921	3,488	−11.3%
1930	3,275	−6.1%
1950	2,537	−22.5%
1961	2,526	−0.4%
1970	2,205	−12.7%

Year	Pop.	±%
1980	2,134	−3.2%
1991	2,118	−0.7%
2001	2,142	+1.1%
2011	2,330	+8.8%
2021	2,391	+2.6%

Source: Censuses

== Transport ==
There are no railways or major roads running through Nechanice.

== Sights ==
The main landmark of Nechanice is the Church of the Assumption of the Virgin Mary. The original church, which was as old as the town, was completely destroyed by a fire in 1827. The current Empire church replaced it in 1833.

== Notable people ==
- Ignác Raab (1715–1787), painter
- Johann Baptist Wanhal (1739–1813), composer
- Jan Nowopacký (1821–1908), painter
- Alois Rašín (1867–1923), politician and economist
- Vladimír Hubáček (1932–2021), rally driver

== Twin towns – sister cities ==
Nechanice is twinned with:

- Czarny Bór, Poland

== See also ==
- Nechanitz, Texas, United States, unincorporated community named after Nechanice
