= Nechanitz, Texas =

Unincorporated community in Texas, US

Coordinates: 30°02′45″N 96°49′37″W

Nechanitz is an unincorporated community in north central Fayette County, Texas, United States.

Nechanitz is at the junction of Farm to Market roads 3011 and 2145, eleven miles north of La Grange in north central Fayette County. The area was settled in 1853 by Wenzel Matejowsky, the first settler from Bohemia to enter Fayette County, and was named after his native town of Nechanice in Bohemia.
