= Dworshak State Park =

State park in Idaho, United States

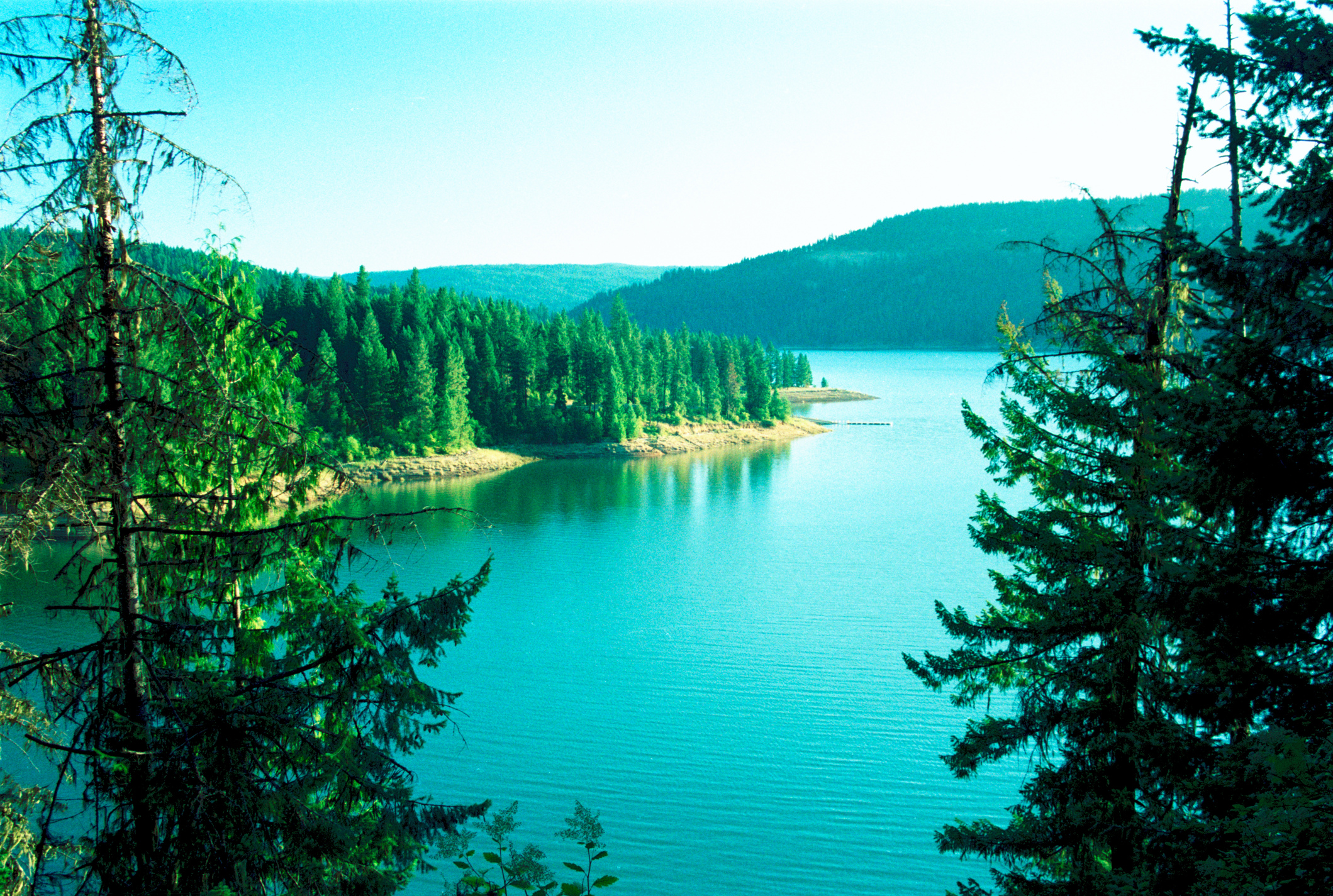
- Dworshak Reservoir

- Location within Idaho Location within the United States
- Location: Clearwater County, Idaho, United States
- Nearest city: Orofino, Idaho
- Coordinates: 46°34′33″N 116°16′48″W
- Area: 850 acres (340 ha)
- Elevation: 1,600 ft (490 m)
- Established: 1989
- Administrator: Idaho Department of Parks and Recreation
- Website: Official website

Dworshak State Park is a public recreation area covering 850 acres (340 ha) along the western shore of Dworshak Reservoir north of Orofino in Clearwater County, Idaho, United States. The state park comprises three units: Freeman Creek, Three Meadows Group Camp, and Big Eddy Lodge and Marina. There are opportunities for boating, fishing, camping, swimming, water-skiing, and hiking in the park.

== Wildlife ==
Animals that inhabit this state park are deer, kokanee, osprey, black crappie, bass, trout and bald eagles.

== Climate ==
Climate chart for Dworshak State Park

Dworshak's climate is classified as Warm-summer Mediterranean climate (Köppen Csa). Among them, the annual average temperature is 51.7 °F (10.9 °C), the hottest month in July is 72.2 °F (22.3 °C), and the coldest month is 33.3 °F (0.7 °C) in December. The annual precipitation is 26.10 inches (662.9 mm), of which November is the wettest with 3.23 inches (82.0 mm), while August is the driest with only 0.68 inches (17.3 mm). The extreme temperature throughout the year ranged from −22 °F (−30 °C) on January 21, 1937 to 118 °F (48 °C) on July 28, 1934.

Climate data for Dworshak State Park, 1991–2020 normals, extremes 1903–present
Month	Jan	Feb	Mar	Apr	May	Jun	Jul	Aug	Sep	Oct	Nov	Dec	Year
Record high °F (°C)	62 (17)	68 (20)	82 (28)	98 (37)	105 (41)	112 (44)	118 (48)	116 (47)	107 (42)	92 (33)	69 (21)	63 (17)	118 (48)
Mean maximum °F (°C)	51.3 (10.7)	58.0 (14.4)	68.8 (20.4)	80.6 (27.0)	90.1 (32.3)	95.6 (35.3)	101.9 (38.8)	102.8 (39.3)	95.3 (35.2)	79.9 (26.6)	60.7 (15.9)	50.5 (10.3)	103.8 (39.9)
Mean daily maximum °F (°C)	40.0 (4.4)	46.0 (7.8)	54.7 (12.6)	62.9 (17.2)	71.7 (22.1)	77.8 (25.4)	89.5 (31.9)	89.8 (32.1)	79.9 (26.6)	62.9 (17.2)	47.5 (8.6)	38.9 (3.8)	63.5 (17.5)
Daily mean °F (°C)	33.8 (1.0)	37.5 (3.1)	43.7 (6.5)	50.3 (10.2)	58.2 (14.6)	64.3 (17.9)	72.2 (22.3)	72.0 (22.2)	63.7 (17.6)	51.0 (10.6)	40.0 (4.4)	33.3 (0.7)	51.7 (10.9)
Mean daily minimum °F (°C)	27.7 (−2.4)	28.9 (−1.7)	32.8 (0.4)	37.6 (3.1)	44.8 (7.1)	50.8 (10.4)	54.9 (12.7)	54.2 (12.3)	47.6 (8.7)	39.0 (3.9)	32.5 (0.3)	27.7 (−2.4)	39.9 (4.4)
Mean minimum °F (°C)	14.5 (−9.7)	18.5 (−7.5)	23.6 (−4.7)	29.6 (−1.3)	34.9 (1.6)	42.4 (5.8)	46.4 (8.0)	45.7 (7.6)	37.9 (3.3)	28.3 (−2.1)	21.3 (−5.9)	16.0 (−8.9)	8.7 (−12.9)
Record low °F (°C)	−22 (−30)	−14 (−26)	−1 (−18)	20 (−7)	25 (−4)	31 (−1)	37 (3)	33 (1)	21 (−6)	15 (−9)	−6 (−21)	−16 (−27)	−22 (−30)
Average precipitation inches (mm)	3.12 (79)	2.57 (65)	2.69 (68)	2.64 (67)	2.38 (60)	1.91 (49)	0.73 (19)	0.68 (17)	0.87 (22)	2.10 (53)	3.23 (82)	3.18 (81)	26.10 (663)
Average snowfall inches (cm)	6.3 (16)	1.7 (4.3)	0.7 (1.8)	0.0 (0.0)	0.0 (0.0)	0.0 (0.0)	0.0 (0.0)	0.0 (0.0)	0.0 (0.0)	0.0 (0.0)	0.7 (1.8)	8.1 (21)	17.5 (44)
Average precipitation days (≥ 0.01 in)	16.5	14.2	15.4	13.9	12.2	10.6	4.2	4.0	5.7	11.5	15.8	16.1	140.1
Average snowy days (≥ 0.1 in)	3.3	1.1	0.4	0.0	0.0	0.0	0.0	0.0	0.0	0.0	0.4	3.4	8.8
Source 1: NOAA
Source 2: National Weather Service

== See also ==
- List of Idaho state parks
- National Parks in Idaho
