= North Fork Clearwater River =

North Fork Clearwater River North Fork of the Clearwater River, The North Fork
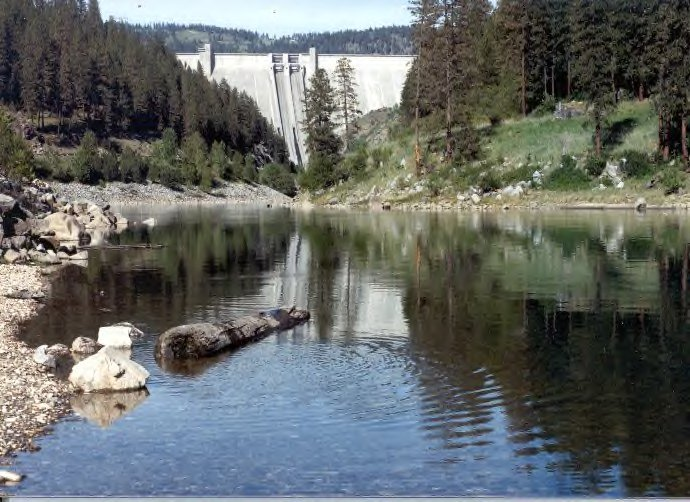
- Dworshak Dam on the North Fork Clearwater, near its mouth

- Location of the mouth of the North Fork Clearwater River in Idaho North Fork Clearwater River (the United States)

Location
- Country: United States
- State: Idaho

Physical characteristics
- Source: Bitterroot Mountains
  - location: Illinois Peak, Shoshone County
  - coordinates: 47°00′11″N 115°06′16″W
  - elevation: 5,400 ft (1,600 m)
- Mouth: Clearwater River
  - location: Ahsahka, Clearwater County
  - coordinates: 46°30′00″N 116°19′50″W
  - elevation: 980 ft (300 m)
- Length: 135 mi (217 km)
- Basin size: 2,462 sq mi (6,380 km^{2})
- Discharge
  - location: Clearwater River
  - average: 5,687.5 cu ft/s (161.05 m^{3}/s)
  - minimum: 799 cu ft/s (22.6 m^{3}/s)
  - maximum: 110,000 cu ft/s (3,100 m^{3}/s)

Basin features
- Tributaries
  - left: Kelly Creek, Wetias Creek
  - right: Little North Fork Clearwater River, Elizabeth Creek

The North Fork Clearwater River is a major tributary of the Clearwater River in the U.S. state of Idaho. From its headwaters in the Bitterroot Mountains of eastern Idaho, it flows 135 miles (217 km) westward and is dammed by the Dworshak Dam just above its mouth in north-central Idaho. Draining a rugged watershed of 2,462 square miles (6,380 km^{2}), the river has an average flow of over 5,600 cubic feet per second (160 m^{3}/s), accounting for a third of the discharge from the Clearwater basin. The river drains parts of Clearwater, Shoshone, Latah, and Idaho counties. Most of the watershed is managed by the United States Forest Service. Some of the fish of the river include westslope cutthroat trout, rainbow trout, mountain whitefish, and the threatened bull trout. It also has smallmouth bass and a kokanee salmon run, both from Dworshak Reservoir. The North Fork drainage is home to grizzly bears, cougars, deer, moose, black bear, elk, grey wolves, and osprey. The river used to have a large steelhead run before the implementation of Dworshak Dam. The North Fork of the Clearwater is located within the Nez Perce-Clearwater National Forests

== Course ==
It rises in the Bitterroot Mountains, which form the far eastern border of the State of Idaho, on the Idaho-Montana border. The headwaters are on the south flank of the triple summits of Graves Peak, Illinois Peak and Gold Crown Peak, very near St. Joe Lake, the head waters of the St. Joe River, which flows into Coeur d'Alene Lake. The river immediately flows southwest through a narrow gorge, joined by numerous small tributaries. The river turns southeast to join with Long Creek and Lake Creek, which flow in from the east. After joining these two large creeks, the river turns west, then receives Elizabeth Creek from the right as it veers to the south. Then it turns sharply west into a wider valley, where it receives its largest tributary thus far, 25-mile (40 km) Kelly Creek, from the left near an unincorporated community, and turns west and southwest, paralleled by Forest Service Road #250. It then receives 4 July Creek from the left, Weitas Creek from the left, Orogrande Creek from the left and Quartz Creek from the right.

Flowing northeast then swinging back west, the river receives Skull Creek from the northeast just downstream of the Quartz Creek confluence. Beaver Creek enters from the south and Isabella Creek from the north. With high buttes towering to the north and comparatively gradual mountains rising on the south, the river enters Dworshak Reservoir, formed by the massive Dworshak Dam. About 8 miles (13 km) later, the flooded canyon meets the canyon of the Little North Fork Clearwater River on the right, which is also flooded for some distance. Still narrow and winding, following the river's original course, the reservoir branches to the south and spreads wider as it enters more gradual terrain. Reeds Creek and Elk Creek, formerly major tributaries of the river, now flow directly into the lake. The reservoir then ends at the Dworshak Dam, a 717 ft (219 m) high concrete gravity dam. Below the dam the river runs southeast for a little over a mile, crosses under Idaho State Route 7, and meets the Clearwater River at Ahsahka.

== Watershed ==
The North Fork Clearwater's watershed covers 2,462 square miles (6,380 km^{2}) of land in the lower Idaho Panhandle. The watershed is approximately 26.6 percent of the 9,645-square-mile (24,980 km^{2}) Clearwater River watershed, itself a tributary of the Snake River. The drainage area of the St. Joe River abuts the North Fork drainage to the north, Latah Creek to the northeast, the Middle Fork Clearwater to the east and south, the South Fork Clearwater and Snake River to the south, and the Potlatch River and Clearwater to the west. The basin is very lightly populated - the largest and only incorporated town is Elk River, Idaho, population 149. The logging industry makes up the primary economy of the North Fork's watershed.

The major tributaries to the North Fork Clearwater River are (proceeding downstream) Kelly Creek, the Little North Fork Clearwater River, and Elk Creek.

On average, streamflow in the North Fork is approximately 5,200 cubic feet per second (150 m^{3}/s), ranging from 1,000 cubic feet per second (28 m^{3}/s) to over 30,000 cubic feet per second (850 m^{3}/s). The USGS operated a stream gauge near the mouth of the river from 1927 to 1968. In that time period, the highest recorded flow was 100,000 cubic feet per second (2,800 m^{3}/s) on December 23, 1933. The lowest peak was 12,200 cubic feet per second (350 m^{3}/s) on 18 May 1941.

== See also ==
- List of Idaho rivers
- List of longest streams of Idaho

== Works cited ==
- Benke, Arthur C.; Cushing, Colbert E. (2005). Rivers of North America. Academic Press. ISBN 0-12-088253-1.
- Robbins, Chuck (2003). On the Fly Guide to the Northern Rockies. Wilderness Adventures Press. ISBN 1-932098-01-1.
