= Dworshak Dam =

Dam in Idaho, United States

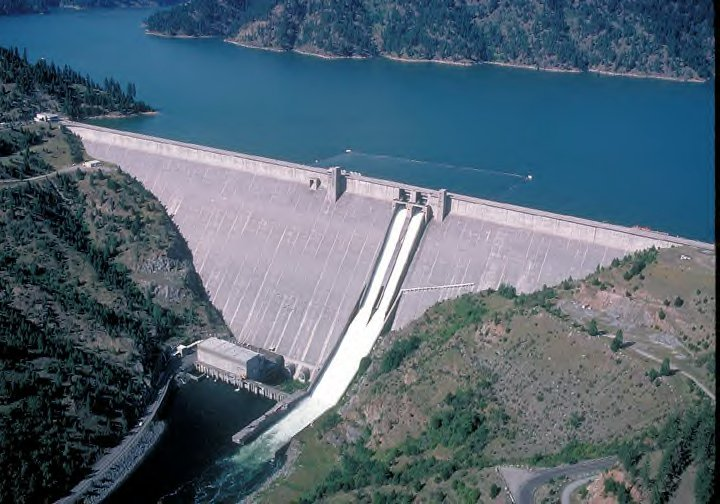
- Aerial view from southwest, with spillways open

- Location in the United States Location in Idaho
- Interactive map of Dworshak Dam
- Country: United States
- Location: Clearwater County, Idaho
- Coordinates: 46°30′54″N 116°17′46″W
- Purpose: Water storage, power
- Construction began: 1966; 60 years ago
- Opening date: 1973; 53 years ago
- Construction cost: $327 million ($2.37 billion in 2025)
- Owner: U.S. Army; Corps of Engineers

Dam and spillways
- Type of dam: Gravity dam
- Impounds: North Fork of the Clearwater River
- Height: 717 ft (219 m)
- Length: 3,287 ft (1,002 m)
- Spillways: Service, 2x tainter gates
- Spillway capacity: 150,000 cu ft/s (4,200 m^{3}/s)

Reservoir
- Creates: Dworshak Reservoir
- Total capacity: 3,468,000 acre⋅ft (4.278 km^{3})
- Active capacity: 2,016,000 acre⋅ft (2.487 km^{3})
- Catchment area: 2,440 mi^{2} (6,300 km^{2})
- Surface area: 17,090 acres (6,920 ha) (max)
- Normal elevation: 1,600 feet (490 m) AMSL

Power Station
- Commission date: 1973
- Hydraulic head: 560 ft (170 m)
- Turbines: 2x 90 MW; 1x 220 MW
- Installed capacity: 400 MW; 460 MW (max. planned)
- Annual generation: 1.693 billion kWh
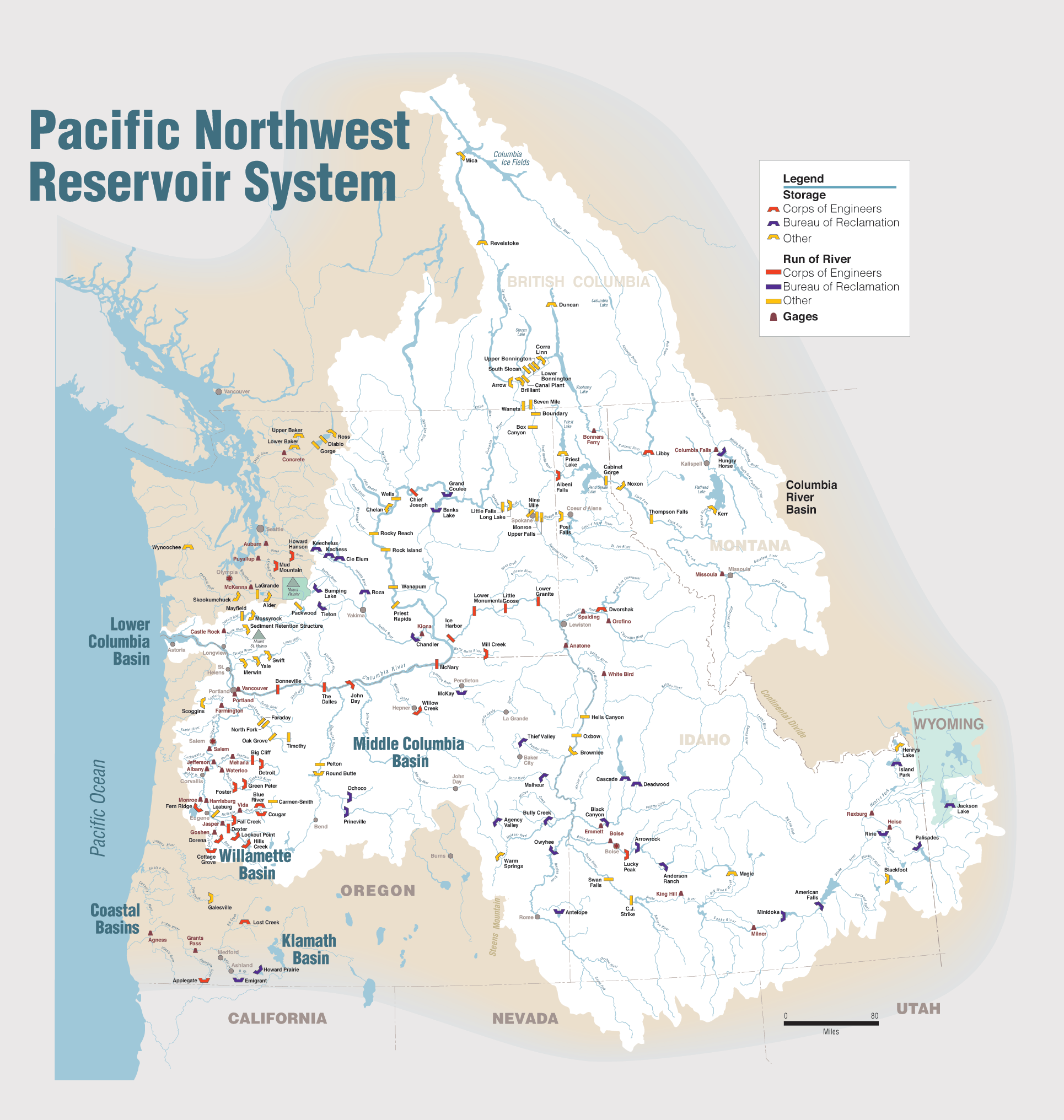
- Columbia River Basin

Dworshak Dam is a concrete gravity dam in the western United States, on the North Fork of the Clearwater River in north central Idaho. In Clearwater County, the dam is located approximately four miles (6 km) northwest of Orofino and impounds the Dworshak Reservoir for flood control and hydroelectricity generation. By capacity, the reservoir is the largest in Idaho and fourth-largest in the Pacific Northwest.

With a height of 717 feet (219 m), Dworshak is the third tallest dam in the U.S. and the tallest straight-axis concrete dam in the Western Hemisphere. Construction of the dam by the U.S. Army Corps of Engineers (USACE) began in 1966 and was completed in 1973.

Lacking fish ladders, the dam blocks fish passage and completely extirpated anadromous fish migration into the upper reaches of the North Fork and its tributaries in Idaho.

== History ==
The proposal for Dworshak Dam originated in a 1953 USACE survey of the lower Snake River drainage basin for suitable sites to develop reservoir storage and hydroelectric power generation. Dworshak was one of seven dam sites considered on the Snake, Salmon and Clearwater River systems. The final site for Dworshak Dam was chosen at a point on the North Fork of the Clearwater 1.9 miles (3.1 km) above its confluence with the larger Clearwater River. The project was authorized on October 23, 1962, as Bruces Eddy Dam; the name was later changed to honor Senator Henry Dworshak (1894–1962), who was instrumental in gaining congressional approval for the dam project.

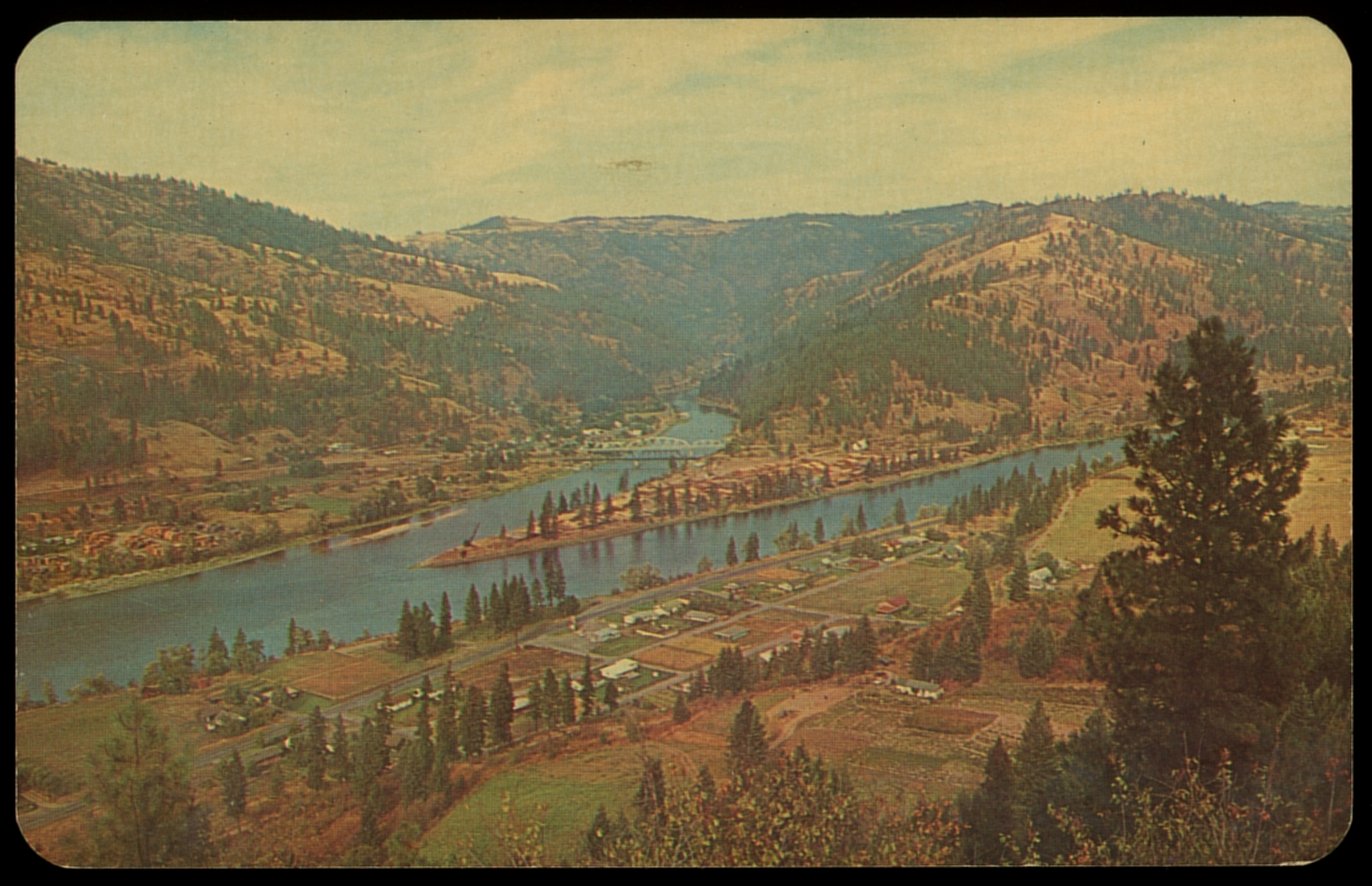
Ahsahka, Idaho, ca. 1960. The North Fork of the Clearwater is the left branch; the dam would be built in the valley just beyond the bridge.

The dam was controversial from the start, because it would block fish migration and its reservoir would flood a large portion of the winter range of elk in the Clearwater River basin. The North Fork of the Clearwater River had an excellent run of steelhead trout and "may have been the finest population of large-size steelhead in the world". However, proponents of the project held that the construction of a fish hatchery would maintain the river's steelhead runs, and that the construction of the dam would render other dam projects in the Clearwater River basin unnecessary. Another big incentive for the project was flood control; supporters of Dworshak cited a devastating flood in 1948, when the Clearwater River reached a peak of 177,000 cubic feet per second (5,000 m^{3}/s)—eleven times its normal flow—as further reason for the construction of a large storage dam.

While clearing and preparations at the dam site were underway as early as June 1965, actual construction did not begin until early 1966 with the excavation of a 40-foot (12 m) diameter diversion tunnel and the creation of a 110-foot (34 m) high cofferdam to divert the river around the dam site. Excavation of keyways in the canyon walls to provide future foundations for the concrete commenced in 1966, and continued through 1968. The first bucket of concrete was placed in early 1968, and by May 28, 1969, more than 1,000,000 cubic yards (760,000 m^{3}) had been poured in the dam. Concrete placement was accomplished by a cableway system supported by three movable towers on the canyon rims, transporting buckets that each had a capacity of 8 cubic yards (6.1 m^{3}) of wet concrete. The diversion tunnel was closed on September 27, 1971, allowing the reservoir to begin filling, and the last concrete was poured on the dam crest on January 27, 1973. Three generating units of the power plant were also installed in 1973, and by March 1, the reservoir had risen to a sufficient level to allow power generation to begin. The reservoir first reached full capacity on July 3, 1973.

After the dam was completed, the USACE acquired 5,120 acres (20.7 km^{2}) of land adjacent to the reservoir (later expanded to 9,100 acres (37 km^{2})), and has since managed it for winter habitat of elk and white-tailed deer. Because Dworshak Dam is too high for a fish ladder to be economically feasible, the USACE constructed the Dworshak National Fish Hatchery (DNFH) at a cost of $21 million to mitigate losses of the North Fork steelhead run caused by Dworshak Dam. The hatchery is located on the small peninsula of land between the North Fork and the main Clearwater River directly above their confluence. Now operated by the National Fish Hatchery System, the fish hatchery actually went into operation in April 1969, four years before the dam was completed. The hatchery has a capacity of 6,000 adult fish, and releases about 3.4 million juveniles into the river system each year.

The Dworshak Dam power station was designed to accommodate six generating units for purposes of peaking power production. However, this form of operation would cause excessively large flow fluctuations on the North Fork Clearwater River, and the main Clearwater River below their confluence at Ahsahka. A dam was to be built on the Clearwater River above Lenore to provide a forebay for smoothing out Dworshak releases, but due to opposition by local residents it was never built. Although it would have been fitted with a fish ladder, the Lenore dam would have affected steelhead and salmon migration to the entire upper Clearwater River and its tributaries, including the South Fork, Middle Fork, Lochsa, and Selway Rivers. In addition, the flooding caused by its 11-mile (18 km)-long reservoir would require the relocation of the Dworshak fish hatchery. The proposed fifth and sixth units of the plant were deauthorized in 1990, and the fourth unit was deauthorized in 1995.

During initial filling of the reservoir, the dam developed several large vertical cracks on the upstream side – some more than 400 feet (120 m) long – due to the rapid change of water pressure from the rising reservoir. Workers had to drill 1.5 in (3.8 cm) diameter drain holes between the cracks and the dam's existing foundation drainage system, or "drainage gallery", at 5-foot (1.5 m) intervals, relieving the pressure on the dam's backside.

In June 1980, the dam again experienced leakage problems when a 236-foot (72 m) crack opened on its upstream face, sending more than 17 cubic feet per second (0.48 m^{3}/s) of water spraying across the downstream side of the dam. Seventy drainage holes were drilled into the crack to relieve pressure before the crack was permanently sealed by an aggregate of cement, volcanic ash, and sawdust. The cost of the repair exceeded $1 million.

The suspension Dent Bridge was constructed 17 miles (27 km) upstream of the dam, and the deck truss Grandad Bridge was built 41 miles (66 km) upstream.

== Specifications ==
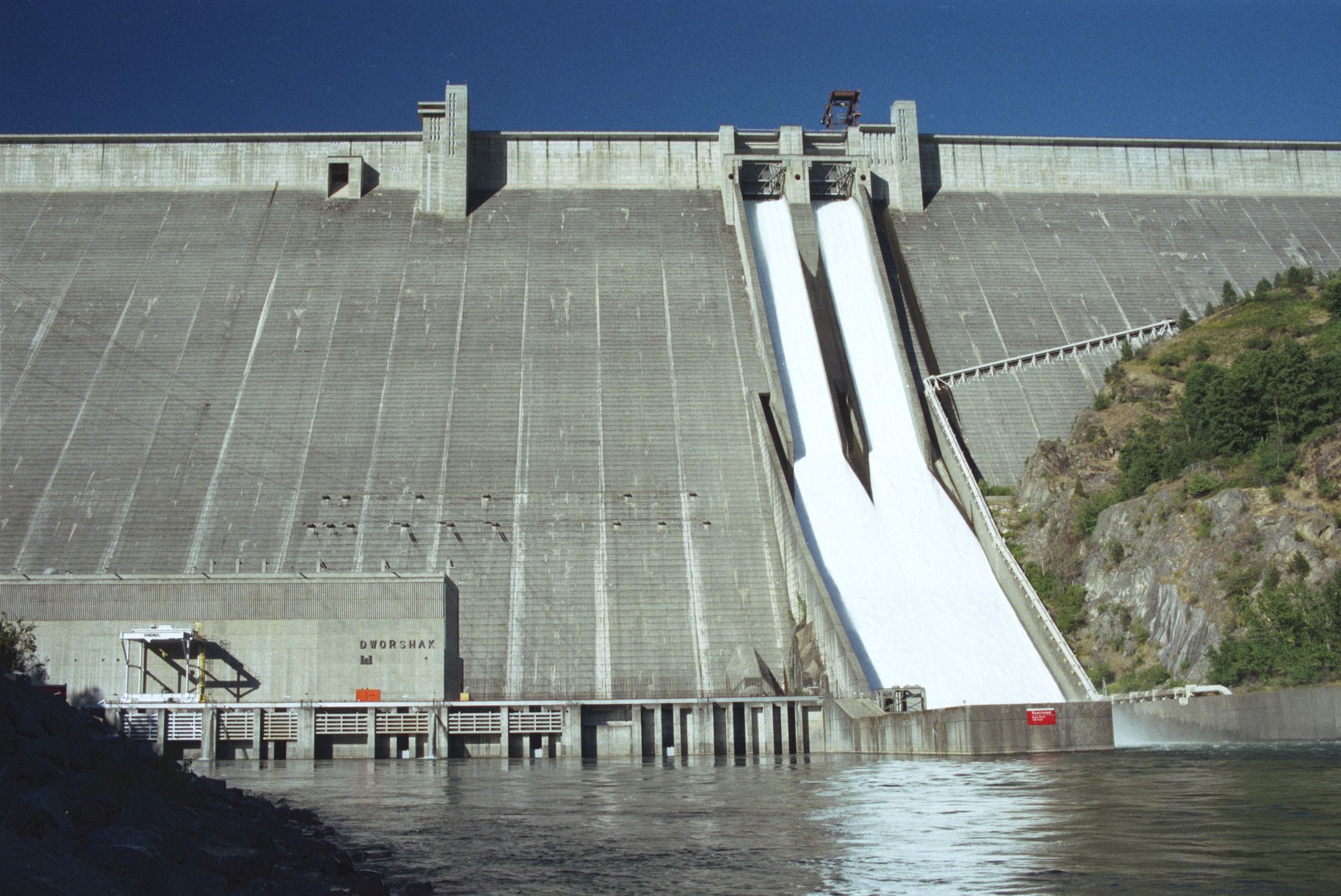
Dworshak Dam

Dworshak Dam is a concrete gravity dam with a sloped downstream face and vertical upstream face, standing 717 feet (219 m) high from the foundations, 632 feet (193 m) above the riverbed and measuring 3,287 feet (1,002 m) long along its crest. The top of the dam is 44 feet (13 m) wide at an elevation of 1,613 feet (492 m) above sea level. The main body of the structure contains approximately 6,500,000 cubic yards (5,000,000 m^{3}) of concrete. High water releases are controlled by a set of outlet works with five gates, capable of releasing 40,000 cubic feet per second (1,100 m^{3}/s), and a spillway controlled by two 50.0 ft × 56.4 ft (15.2 m × 17.2 m) tainter gates. The spillway has a capacity of 150,000 cu ft/s (4,200 m^{3}/s) at maximum reservoir elevation. Dworshak Reservoir is the name of the lake formed behind the dam. At normal maximum water levels of 1,600 feet (490 m) above sea level, the reservoir stretches 53 miles (85 km) upstream, covering 17,090 acres (69.2 km^{2}) and containing 3,468,000 acre-feet (4.278 km^{3}) of water with 175 miles (282 km) of shoreline.

The hydroelectric plant located at the base of the dam is a 428-foot (130 m) long concrete structure and contains one 346,000 hp (258,000 kW) and two 142,000 hp (106,000 kW) turbines that power one 220 megawatt (MW) and two 90 MW generators, respectively, for a total capacity of 400 MW. The rated hydraulic head for the powerhouse is 560 feet (170 m), with a maximum of 632 feet (193 m) when the reservoir is full and a minimum of 417 feet (127 m) required for power generation. Up to 10,500 cubic feet per second (300 m^{3}/s) of water can be released through the power plant at maximum capacity. The overload capacity of the two small units is 103.5 MW and for the large unit is 253.0 MW, for a total of 460 MW. As proposed, Units 4, 5, and 6, each with a capacity of 220 MW, would have brought the total generating capacity to 1,060 MW, potentially making it one of the largest hydroelectric plants in Idaho.

== Operations ==
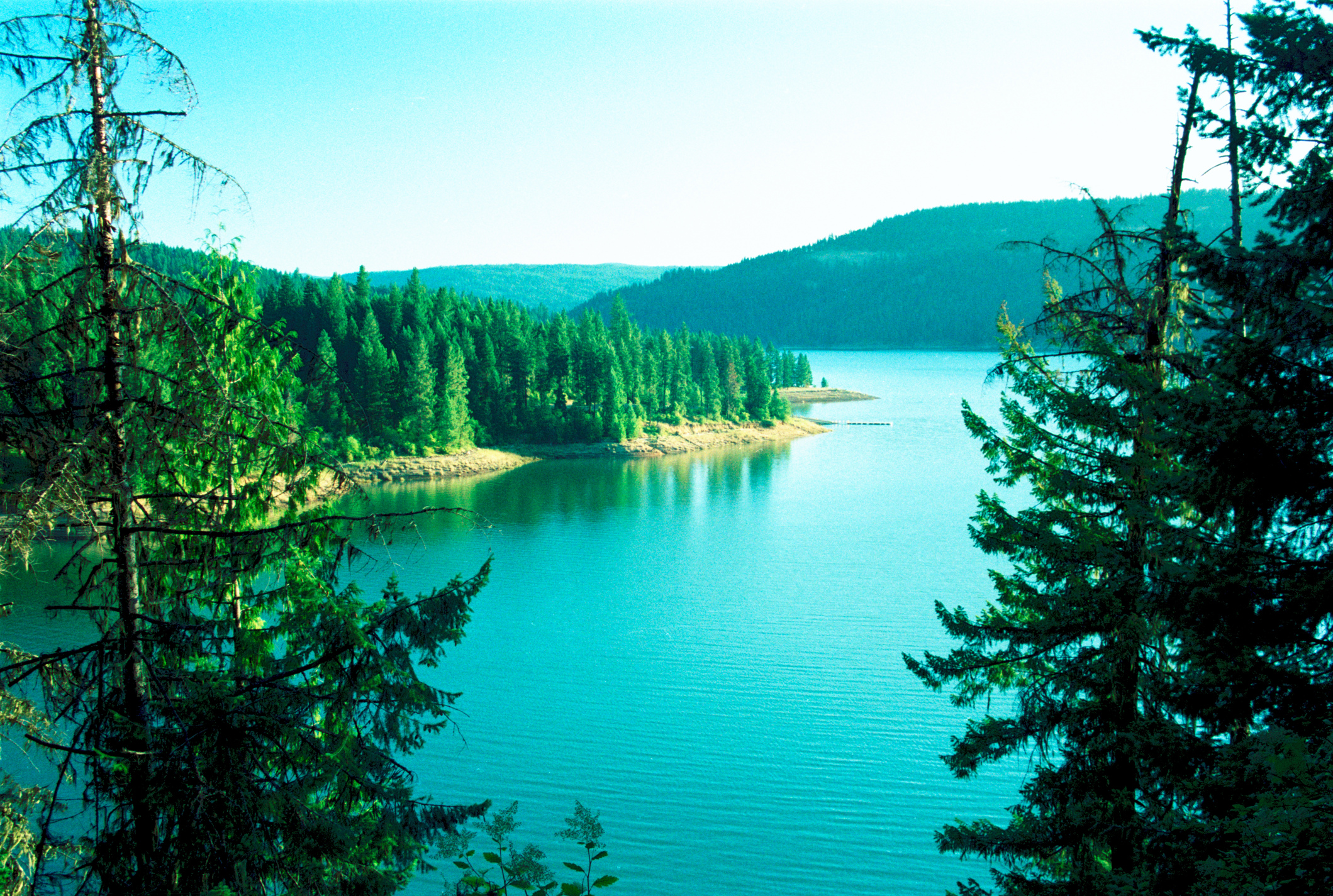
Dworshak Reservoir, nearly full in June 2003

The total usable storage capacity or active capacity of Dworshak Reservoir, including flood control, is 2,016,000 acre-feet (2.487 km^{3}). The inactive capacity (the portion of the reservoir's capacity below the power generating outlets and the lower river outlet works) is 682,000 acre-feet (0.841 km^{3}), and the dead pool (below the river outlet works) corresponds to a storage of 770,000 acre-feet (0.95 km^{3}). In addition, the reservoir has a surcharge capacity (above the spillway gates) of 92,000 acre-feet (0.113 km^{3}), bringing the maximum amount of water that can be retained behind the dam to 3,560,000 acre-feet (4.39 km^{3}).

Most of the active capacity not used for flood control is used for power production. Because the Lenore dam on the Clearwater River was never built, Dworshak cannot be used as a peaking power facility. Thus, the power plant is operated as a base load plant, with a relatively constant release. Discharge rates from the dam only increase significantly during high water summers, when flooding requires the opening of the spillways. The power plant generates an average of 1.693 billion KWh each year. Water releases from Dworshak Dam are also controlled to optimize power generation at four downstream dams on the Snake River and four more on the Columbia River.

Each winter, the level of Dworshak Reservoir is drawn down an average of 155 feet (47 m) to prepare for the North Fork's annual freshet, which once could reach more than 100,000 cu ft/s (2,800 m^{3}/s) after a heavy snowmelt. The reservoir is required to maintain a minimum of 700,000 acre-feet (0.86 km^{3}) of winter flood-storage space, and dam releases are operated so that water levels reach a maximum of 1,570 feet (480 m) in July. However, annual flood control reservations vary with the amount of snowpack in the 2,440-square-mile (6,300 km^{2}) drainage basin above the dam. The annual flood-control drawdown generally begins in September and ends on April 1 of the following year; snowmelt floods are captured in the reservoir between April and July. Although the reservoir covers more than 17,000 acres (69 km^{2}) at full pool, the surface area decreases to 9,050 acres (36.6 km^{2}) at the lowest point of the drawdown. Flood storage space in Dworshak can be interchanged with other major dams in the Columbia River system, including large Columbia mainstem dams such as Grand Coulee, depending on varying flood control requirements in the Columbia Basin.

Water releases from Dworshak are also timed to benefit Pacific salmon and steelhead migration in the Clearwater, Snake and Columbia Rivers. During late summer through the fall, large volumes of cold water are released through the dam's low level outlets to help cool water in downstream rivers, creating more suitable temperatures for these fish species. These environmental or "flow augmentation" releases significantly increase water levels during the late summer, with up to 14,600 cu ft/s (410 m^{3}/s) being released through the dam in August and 10,400 cu ft/s (290 m^{3}/s) in September. The temperature of the released water generally varies from 46 to 48 °F (8 to 9 °C).

== Tourism and economy ==
One of the major benefits touted by proponents of the Dworshak Dam was that it would provide recreation and associated economic benefits to local residents. The annual visitation to Dworshak is estimated at between 110,000 and 140,000 people, mostly during the summer high water months. Recreational activities include boating, water-skiing, camping, fishing, hiking and hunting; six boat ramps lie adjacent to the reservoir. Idaho's Dworshak State Park is located on Dworshak Reservoir about 3 miles (5 km) north of the dam. The uppermost arm of the reservoir extends into the Clearwater National Forest. A regional visitor center is located at Dworshak Dam, and tours are available of the dam itself. However, the large annual drawdown of the reservoir causes boat ramps and marinas to be out of reach for months each year and an unsightly "bathtub ring" to be visible along the shoreline. A study by the University of Idaho calculated that this mode of operation causes the loss of between $4.5–5.9 million of tourism revenues each year.

The creation of a slackwater pool along 53 miles (85 km) of the North Fork formerly assisted logging operations in the region, although the scale of the lumber industry has decreased significantly since the 20th century. About 81 million board feet were transported on Dworshak Reservoir between 1988 and 1991; however, logs have not been barged on the lake since 1991. This is in part because of the implementation of a late-summer flow augmentation scheme that requires greater drawdowns of the reservoir, putting log-handling facilities well above the water level, and also because of the development of backcountry logging roads that allow more efficient transport by truck. It has been suggested that some of Dworshak's flood control space be shifted to Grand Coulee Dam in northern Washington to provide increased water for flow augmentation; this would carry the added benefits of improving recreation on the lake.

== See also ==
- List of largest reservoirs in the United States
- List of the tallest dams in the United States

== Works cited ==
- Combs, Trey (1999). Steelhead Fly Fishing. Globe Pequot. ISBN 1-5582-1903-X.
- Commission on Engineering and Technical Systems (1983). Safety of Existing Dams: Evaluation and Improvement. The National Academies Press.
