= Bohemia Township, Knox County, Nebraska =

Bohemia Township
- Township
- Location in Knox County
- Coordinates: 42°39′07″N 098°08′18″W
- Country: United States
- State: Nebraska
- County: Knox

Area
  - Total: 33.58 sq mi (86.97 km^{2})
  - Land: 33.58 sq mi (86.97 km^{2})
  - Water: 0 sq mi (0 km^{2}) 0%
- Elevation: 1,539 ft (469 m)

Population (2020)
  - Total: 42
  - Density: 1.3/sq mi (0.48/km^{2})
- GNIS feature ID: 0837889

Bohemia Township is one of thirty townships in Knox County, Nebraska, United States. The population was 42 at the 2020 census. A 2023 estimate placed the township's population at 41.

A majority of the early settlers being natives of Bohemia caused the name to be selected.

== See also ==
- County government in Nebraska
