= Bohemia Township, Saunders County, Nebraska =

Bohemia Township
- Township
- Location in Saunders County
- Coordinates: 41°24′32″N 096°51′28″W
- Country: United States
- State: Nebraska
- County: Saunders

Area
  - Total: 27.87 sq mi (72.18 km^{2})
  - Land: 27.78 sq mi (71.96 km^{2})
  - Water: 0.085 sq mi (0.22 km^{2}) 0.3%
- Elevation: 1,398 ft (426 m)

Population (2020)
  - Total: 147
  - Density: 5.29/sq mi (2.04/km^{2})
- GNIS feature ID: 0837890

Bohemia Township is one of twenty-four townships in Saunders County, Nebraska, United States. The population was 147 at the 2020 census. A 2021 estimate placed the township's population at 150.

== See also ==
- County government in Nebraska
