= Ahsahka, Idaho =

Unincorporated community in the state of Idaho, United States

Map of Clearwater County, where Ahsahka is located

Ahsahka is a small unincorporated community located in Clearwater County, Idaho, United States, and is close to the Dworshak Dam. Ahsahka is located at 46°30′08″N 116°19′27″W. The ZIP Code for Ahsahka is 83520. Its name comes from the Nez Perce word /asáqa/, which means "river mouth" or "confluence".

== Climate ==
Climate data for Ahsahka, Idaho
| Month | Jan | Feb | Mar | Apr | May | Jun | Jul | Aug | Sep | Oct | Nov | Dec | Year |
|---|---|---|---|---|---|---|---|---|---|---|---|---|---|
| Mean daily maximum °F (°C) | 39.3 (4.1) | 46.6 (8.1) | 55.2 (12.9) | 63.4 (17.4) | 71.9 (22.2) | 79.2 (26.2) | 89.5 (31.9) | 89.8 (32.1) | 79.5 (26.4) | 64.0 (17.8) | 47.6 (8.7) | 39.0 (3.9) | 63.8 (17.7) |
| Mean daily minimum °F (°C) | 26.8 (−2.9) | 29.3 (−1.5) | 33.4 (0.8) | 38.3 (3.5) | 45.0 (7.2) | 51.4 (10.8) | 55.8 (13.2) | 54.7 (12.6) | 47.6 (8.7) | 38.8 (3.8) | 33.0 (0.6) | 27.7 (−2.4) | 40.1 (4.5) |
| Average precipitation inches (mm) | 3.0 (76) | 2.2 (56) | 2.4 (61) | 2.3 (58) | 2.5 (64) | 1.8 (46) | 0.9 (23) | 0.8 (20) | 1.2 (30) | 1.8 (46) | 3.1 (79) | 3.1 (79) | 25.1 (640) |
Source: Weatherbase
