= KLMB =

KLMB may refer to:

- KLMB (FM), a radio station (99.9 FM) licensed to serve Klein, Montana, United States
- KLMB-CD, a low-power television station (channel 36, virtual 23) licensed to serve El Dorado, Arkansas, United States
- KXEM, a radio station (88.1 FM) licensed to serve Roundup, Montana, which held the call sign KLMB from 2008 to 2017
