= Klein, Montana =

- Census-designated place
- Location in Musselshell County and the state of Montana
- Coordinates: 46°23′40″N 108°32′54″W
- Country: United States
- State: Montana
- County: Musselshell

Area
  - Total: 12.85 sq mi (33.28 km^{2})
  - Land: 12.85 sq mi (33.28 km^{2})
  - Water: 0 sq mi (0.00 km^{2})
- Elevation: 3,363 ft (1,025 m)

Population (2020)
  - Total: 163
  - Density: 13/sq mi (4.9/km^{2})
- Time zone: UTC-7 (Mountain (MST))
  - Summer (DST): UTC-6 (MDT)
- ZIP code: 59072 (Roundup)
- Area code: 406
- FIPS code: 30-41050
- GNIS feature ID: 2408493

Klein is a census-designated place (CDP) in Musselshell County, Montana, United States. It contains the unincorporated communities of Klein, Gibbtown, and Farralltown. The population was 163 at the 2020 census.

== Geography ==
Klein is in west-central Musselshell County and is bordered to the north by the Musselshell River and the Camp Three CDP. Roundup, the county seat, is 4 miles (6 km) to the northeast. U.S. Route 87 passes through Klein from north to south, joining U.S. Route 12 just north of the CDP and continuing into Roundup. To the south, US 87 leads 45 miles (72 km) to Billings.

According to the U.S. Census Bureau, the Klein CDP has a total area of 12.9 square miles (33 km^{2}), all land.

== Demographics ==
Historical population
Census	Pop.	Note	%±
2000	188		—
2010	168		−10.6%
2020	163		−3.0%
U.S. Decennial Census

As of the census of 2000, there were 188 people, 69 households, and 52 families residing in the CDP. The population density was 14.6 inhabitants per square mile (5.6/km^{2}). There were 90 housing units at an average density of 7.0 per square mile (2.7/km^{2}). The racial makeup of the CDP was 95.21% White, 3.19% Native American, 1.06% Pacific Islander, and 0.53% from two or more races. Hispanic or Latino of any race were 1.06% of the population.

There were 69 households, out of which 30.4% had children under the age of 18 living with them, 65.2% were married couples living together, 7.2% had a female householder with no husband present, and 24.6% were non-families. 18.8% of all households were made up of individuals, and 11.6% had someone living alone who was 65 years of age or older. The average household size was 2.72 and the average family size was 3.12.

In the CDP, the population was spread out, with 21.8% under the age of 18, 5.9% from 18 to 24, 21.8% from 25 to 44, 37.8% from 45 to 64, and 12.8% who were 65 years of age or older. The median age was 45 years. For every 100 females, there were 111.2 males. For every 100 females age 18 and over, there were 113.0 males.

The median income for a household in the CDP was $39,792, and the median income for a family was $38,542. Males had a median income of $29,000 versus $18,750 for females. The per capita income for the CDP was $15,522. About 14.0% of families and 11.6% of the population were below the poverty line, including 50.0% of those under the age of eighteen and none of those 65 or over.

== Local media ==
The local newspaper is the Roundup Record-Tribune. It is published weekly and serves Musselshell County and the neighboring counties. The FM radio station KLMB is licensed in Klein.
