= RPX =

RPX may refer to:

- RPX Corporation
- Roundup Airport IATA code
- Regal Premium Experience, a theater format by Regal Entertainment Group.
