= Kilby Butte Colony, Montana =

- Census-designated place
- Location within Montana Location within the United States
- Coordinates: 46°28′34″N 108°21′37″W
- Country: United States
- State: Montana
- County: Musselshell

Area
  - Total: 0.11 sq mi (0.28 km^{2})
  - Land: 0.11 sq mi (0.28 km^{2})
  - Water: 0 sq mi (0.00 km^{2})
- Elevation: 3,124 ft (952 m)

Population (2020)
  - Total: 0
  - Density: 0/sq mi (0/km^{2})
- Time zone: UTC-7 (Mountain (MST))
  - Summer (DST): UTC-6 (MDT)
- ZIP Code: 59072 (Roundup)
- Area code: 406
- FIPS code: 30-40680
- GNIS feature ID: 2806654

Kilby Butte Colony is a Hutterite community and census-designated place (CDP) in Musselshell County, Montana, United States. It is in the center of the county, on the south side of U.S. Route 12, 9 miles (14 km) east of Roundup, the county seat. It is on the north side of the Musselshell River, an east-flowing tributary of the Missouri River.

The community was first listed as a CDP prior to the 2020 census. At the 2020 census, the population was recorded as zero.

== Geography ==
According to the U.S. Census Bureau, the area of the CDP is 0.11 square miles (0.28 km^{2}), all land. The unincorporated community of Gage is 1 mile (1.6 km) to the west on US 12.

== Demographics ==
Historical population
Census	Pop.	Note	%±
2020	0		—
U.S. Decennial Census
