= Paris Gibson Square Museum of Art =

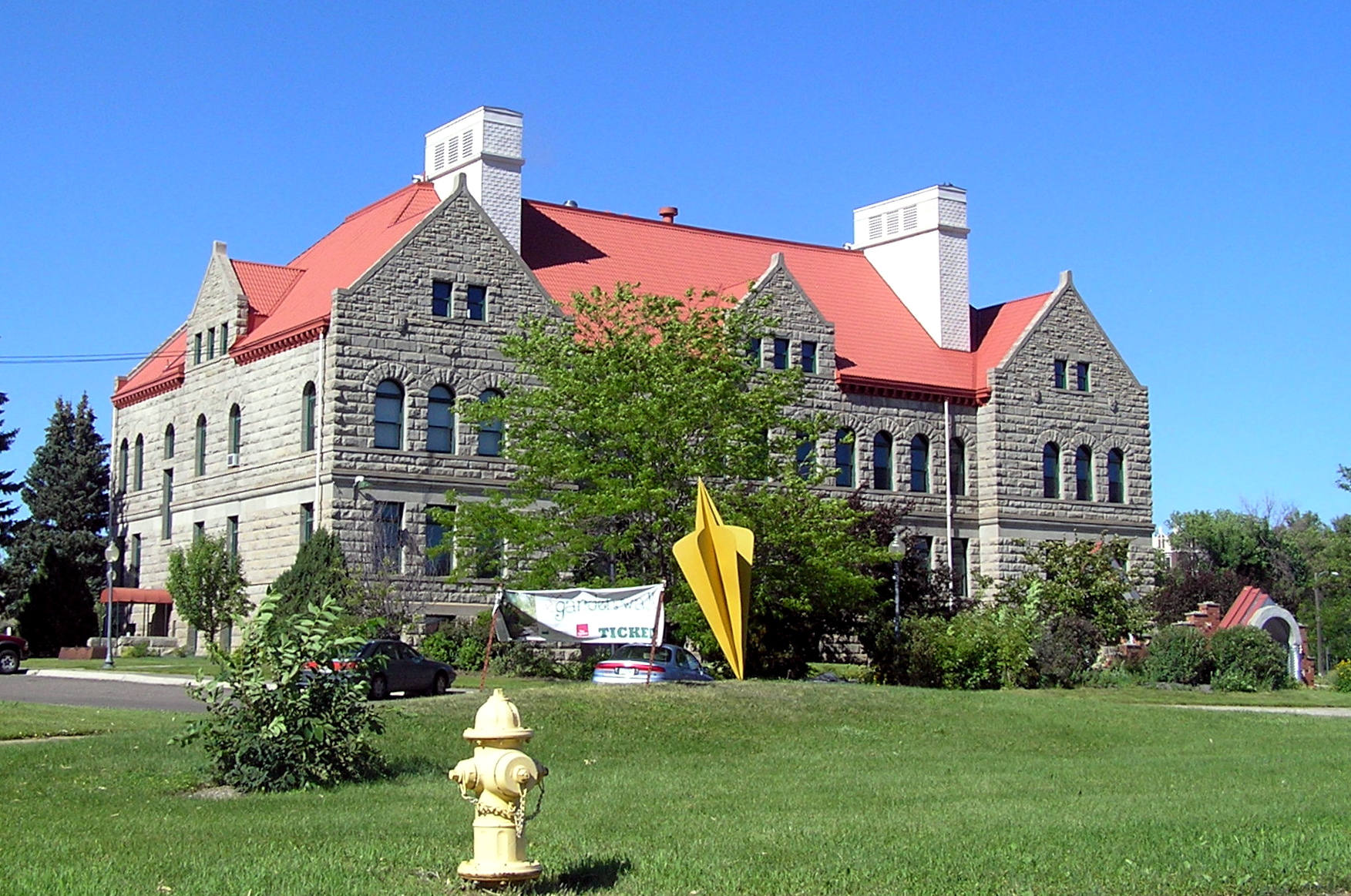

- Location within Montana
- Established: 1977
- Location: 1400 First Avenue North, Great Falls, Montana, U.S.
- Coordinates: 47.505947°N 111.282579°W
- Type: Art museum
- Visitors: 29,000 (2010)
- Director: Tracy Cosgrove
- Curator: Nicole Maria Evans
- Website: the-square.org

- Great Falls Central High School
- U.S. National Register of Historic Places
- Location: 1400 First Avenue North, Great Falls, Montana, U.S.
- Built: 1896
- Architect: William White
- Architectural style: Romanesque Revival
- NRHP reference No.: 76001120
- Added to NRHP: September 1, 1976

Paris Gibson Square Museum of Art (also known as The Square, or PGSMoA), is an art museum located at 1400 First Avenue North in Great Falls, Montana, in the United States. Its building was constructed in 1896 to house the city's first high school, Great Falls High School (later known as Great Falls Central High School). The high school moved to new quarters in 1931, at which time the building was renamed Paris Gibson Junior High School. The junior high school vacated the premises in 1975 for a new building. In 1977, Paris Gibson Square Museum of Art was formed, and it took ownership of the building. It is one of twelve museums in the city. The structure has been listed on the National Register of Historic Places since September 1976.

The museum focuses primarily on contemporary art by artists from the region. Much of its collection consists of folk art, abstract art, postmodern art, and functional artwork such as jewelry. In addition to two floors of galleries, the museum also hosts an outdoor sculpture garden.

(The structure should not be confused with the Roman Catholic parochial school also named Great Falls Central High School. The Square should also not be confused with Paris Gibson Education Center, an alternative high school which opened in 2007).

== Great Falls Central High School ==
=== Construction ===
Great Falls was founded in 1883 when businessman Paris Gibson surveyed the city and platted a permanent settlement on the south side of the river. It was incorporated on November 28, 1888. By 1890, Black Eagle Dam had been built within the city limits on the Great Falls of the Missouri River, a meat packing industry (the largest between St. Paul, Minnesota, and Spokane, Washington) had arisen, a railway had come to town, and a silver smelter had been built. The city's public school system was established in 1886. That year, the city opened the Whittier Building (later known as Whittier Elementary School) and began holding ungraded educational instruction for all students there.

Great Falls High School was founded in the fall of 1890 by the city of Great Falls after four teenage girls (newly arrived in the city) asked to receive a high school public education. The four young women constituted the first class, which met in a corner of a classroom in the Whittier Building (which, by that time, featured instruction in the sixth, seventh, and eighth grades). By September 1892, Great Falls High School was an independent school within the city public school system. Its 23 students also had a specified course of instruction (rather than general classes).

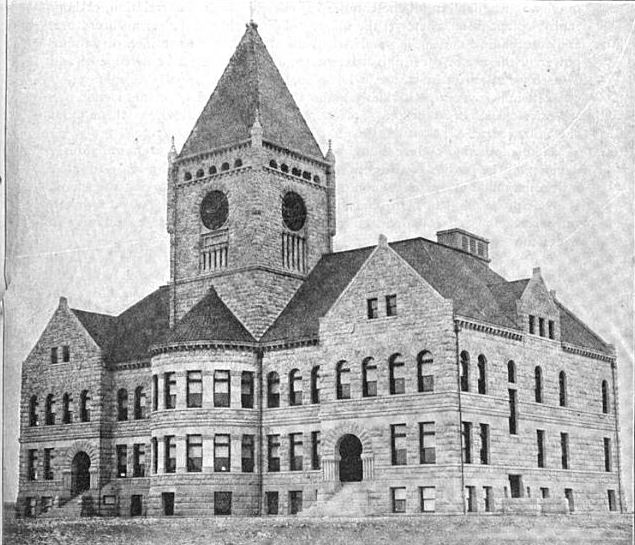
The original Great Falls High School Building (pictured) was constructed in 1896.

In 1896, the Great Falls Public Schools built the first Great Falls High School building. City voters passed an initiative in 1893 to sell bonds to build a high school, but the Panic of 1893 delayed construction. A design by local architect William White was chosen over three other proposals.

=== About the high school building ===
White's Romanesque Revival three-story structure featured a small central circular building, two rectangular wings, and an eight-story, four-faced clock tower. Construction on the building, located at 1400 First Avenue North, began in 1894. The high school was built of gray sandstone obtained from quarries near both Helena and Great Falls. The walls, which were 5 feet (1.5 m) thick at the bottom of the building but only 4 feet (1.2 m) thick at the roof, were sunk 16 feet (4.9 m) into the earth and stood on shale bedrock. To compact the foundation's backfill, a herd of sheep was driven around the structure 100 times. Wood for the interior supports, roof, and steps were cut from massive trees logged in the Rocky Mountains and floated down the Missouri River.

The finished building featured a tin mansard roof (molded and painted to look like tile), gables, and an attic suspended from the roof joists. The interior woodwork was solid oak, all rooms had 3-foot (0.91 m) high wainscoting, the solid doors were 2.5 inches (6.4 cm) thick, and highly detailed molded pediments were emplaced over each door. Ornate brass doorknobs and hinges were used throughout the building, and heat was supplied by cast iron radiators with delicate, filigreed covers. The building (whose original cost was estimated at $59,940) was completed by McKay Brothers in 1896 at a total cost of $110,000. The structure, which was designed to educate 500 students, contained 14 classrooms, a physical laboratory, a chemical laboratory, an art studio, and an assembly hall that could seat 400. A boiler system was installed in the basement.

A brick annex, designed by architect W.R. Lowery, was constructed against the high school's south side in 1913 at a cost of $200,000. At this time, the boiler system was moved from the basement of the high school to the area between the main building and the annex. An urban legend (which may have begun as early as the 1910s) began to circulate that the old boiler room was turned into a swimming pool, and that a student drowned in the pool—leaving the high school haunted. An investigation in the 1990s revealed that although student Grant Mill from Great Falls High School did drown in 1915, he did not drown in a fictitious pool in the basement but rather in the Missouri River. (Nonetheless, in July 2010, museum executive director Kathy Lear admitted that she once heard ghostly radio music coming from the basement late one afternoon.)

The clock tower was removed in 1916 after its massive weight began to compromise the building.

In 1917, a janitor was permitted to live on the site with his family. Frank Miles was given $150 and allowed to construct an apartment for himself, his wife, and his five children in the southeast corner of the high school's attic. It is uncertain how many years he and his family lived there.

=== Use as Paris Gibson Junior High School ===
Great Falls High School moved into a new building in 1931. In 1927, the Great Falls public school system sought voter approval to issue bonds to build a new high school, but this initiative was defeated. The bond issue was brought before voters again in 1928, and it passed. Construction on a new, $1 million building began in 1928 and continued through 1929.

From 1930 to 1975, the Great Falls High School building housed Paris Gibson Junior High School. The north entrance was closed in the 1940s after the front steps were discovered to be sinking. The driveway in front of this entrance was removed in the 1970s and replaced with sod. The south entrance was used as the main entrance after 1940. In the late 1960s, while repairs to the structure's roof were being made, a student broke into the building and climbed atop the elevator. He rode the elevator to the roof. But he touched a power line as he climbed off the elevator, giving him a severe electrical shock and causing his shirt to catch fire. He survived with minimal injuries. Another accident occurred shortly before the building was closed in the 1970s. A student in the gymnasium (which was housed in the brick annex), attempted to do chin-ups on a water pipe. The pipe snapped, causing the gym to be flooded.

The junior high school vacated the premises in June 1975 for a new building at 2400 Central Avenue. Several local Catholic parishes joined together in the late 1940s to construct a Catholic high school, named Great Falls Central High School. The low brick, steel, glass, and plaster building, constructed in 1950, occupied half a city block next to the Ursuline Academy. Two large wings were added in 1966. However, the building closed in 1973 due to lower enrollment, rising costs, and fewer volunteer priests and nuns to act as teachers. The Great Falls Public Schools purchased the structure in 1975 for $1.4 million. It spent another $800,000 renovating the building and adding an industrial arts wing on the southwest corner. Paris Gibson Junior High moved there in 1976 from the old high school building.

The former Great Falls Central High School was listed on the National Register of Historic Places in September 1976.

== Paris Gibson Square Museum of Art ==
=== Founding and early years ===
After the departure of Paris Gibson Junior High School from the old Great Falls High School building in June 1975, there was deep concern that the building might be demolished. The building was in disrepair from decades of use as a public school, the HVAC and mechanical systems needed upgrading, and the building was ill-prepared for mothballing. Vandalism, weather, and lack of use quickly began to take its toll, as the building sat vacant for a year. A local coalition of historic preservationists, concerned citizens, and art aficionados quickly formed to save the historic structure. Great Falls had long been home to the C. M. Russell Museum (dedicated to the works of Western artist Charles Marion Russell and others), but there was no institution supporting contemporary artists or art in other genres. The effort to save the historic high school began in 1974, during the citywide debate over whether to purchase the Catholic high school for use as a junior high. Jean Warden Dybdal and Pam Marlen, leaders in the Junior League chapter in Great Falls, organized an informal citizen's task force to come up with a plan to save the high school building. The initial plan was to create a community cultural center, although over time this changed into a more formal museum proposal. The Junior League and its allies successfully pushed the Great Falls Public Schools and Commissioners of Cascade County to sign an agreement whereby the structure became jointly owned by both governmental bodies. Cascade County agreed to provide funding for the structure's renovation and operations. The art museum was tasked with becoming financially self-sustaining. GFPS agreed to lease the structure to the museum for $1 a year, but not pay for any renovations. As part of the agreement with GFPS, the museum also agreed to devote a substantial portion of its resources to educating students and the public about art and art-making.

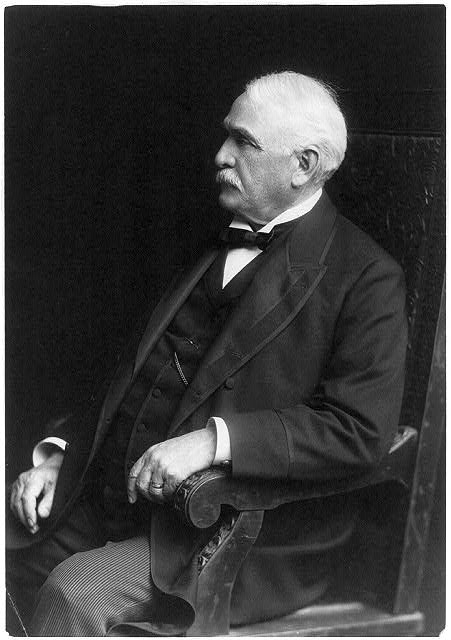
Paris Gibson, the museum's namesake.

The Paris Gibson Square Museum of Art (The Square) was incorporated as a nonprofit institution in 1976. It was named for Paris Gibson, the city's founder. The museum faced two immediate problems. First, the historic building was climate controlled for the storage or display of perishable art, and lacked storage space. Second, the museum had no collection to display. Renovations began immediately, with community volunteers providing most of the work. Some aspects of the building—such as the highly detailed brass doorknobs and door hinges, the carved door frames, and ornate iron grating over the air vents—were retained. However, the 3-foot (0.91 m) high oak wainscoting and historic slate blackboards were covered over with drywall, which both protected them from damage as well as provided much-needed display space. As the Great Falls High School structure was renovated, the museum quickly began acquiring art for display, primarily through donations. In late 1976, it acquired 243 sculptures by Lee Steen, a nationally known folk artist from Roundup, Montana. The museum, unable to display Steen's work, stored it in its attic.

Just prior to the museum's opening, a portion of the structure blew up. The explosion was planned by the producers of the motion picture Telefon. City and GFPS officials agreed that the 1913 brick annex, which was not historic and which marred the southern side of the structure, should be demolished. The film's producers sought permission from the city to film the demolition, which involved ramming the building with a prop Jeep and causing it to explode (saving the city $23,000). The explosives were rigged so that the explosion occurred solely in a southern, eastern, and western direction—away from the historic building. The museum was undamaged. However, the explosion was so powerful that it hurled flaming debris onto the rooftops of several nearby homes, causing some damage.

Initially, Cascade County budgeted for the museum's support annually. But in 1993, the county signed an agreement with The Square and the Cascade County Historical Society in which the county agreed to give the museum $66,000 a year for building maintenance. Additionally, the county sought voter approval for a mill levy which would generate income to support both the museum and the historical society. Under a formula included in the agreement, The Square received slightly more of the mill levy than the historical society.

The Paris Gibson Museum of Art opened its doors in 1977. In its early years, the museum built is collection and upgraded its space to accommodate its mission of displaying contemporary artwork as well as providing classrooms for lectures, art-making, teaching, and performances. Due to the limited size of the collection, the museum leased space to the Cascade County Historical Society, Great Falls Genealogy Society, Junior League, and Montana Wilderness Society. (For a time, The History Museum was also co-located in the structure.) In 1988, curator Mark Leach organized one of the first exhibitions of actor Robert De Niro's artwork. The exhibition debuted at the Everson Museum of Art in Syracuse, New York.

=== 1990s ===
The museum inaugurated an outdoor sculpture garden in 1993. The first piece to be placed in the garden was Robert Harrison's 1993 "Gibson Gateway". The piece was submitted as part of a statewide competition held by The Square, which Harrison won. The brick and masonry work depicts an archway (painted blue) framed by a series of freestand brick walls. The second piece in the sculpture garden was Richard Swanson's "Prairie Tops", added in 2001. The fluted, dreidel-like piece of aluminum (painted yellow) stands near the southeast corner of the building. In 2002, The Square commissioned a new work, titled "Two Sisters", from Great Falls High School art teacher Lisa Easton. Funding for the piece came from The Square and the Meadowlark Foundation. The sculpture incorporates 1,500 pounds (680 kg) of shonkinite (both as gravel and as carved stones of various size on top of the gravel) held by a steel basin flush in the ground. A curving fan of steel pushes through the gravel. Two more pieces were added in 2012. The first is Theodore Waddell's untitled, undated piece which stands near the building's west entrance. The rectangular piece has an undulating upper surface, and is made of weathering steel (which gives it a brown patina). The other piece was local artist Mike Hollern's untitled, undated piece near the north entrance. This metal work is reminiscent of an upright chipped flint arrowhead with a fish's tail.

Beginning in 1995, The Square began a $1.5 million "Centennial Campaign" fund-raising effort to make major improvements to its facility and to begin an endowment. The capital campaign, chaired by Diane Volk (whose father founded Volk Construction, a large building company in the state), surpassed its goal by $170,000 in early 1999. The funds allowed the museum to remove the sod from its north entrance and reinstall a historically accurate circular driveway. Local architectural firm L'Heureux Page Werner designed the new drive and staircase stabilization. The Helena, Montana, firm Dick Anderson Construction performed the stair work. Local construction firm United Materials, Inc. donated the materials for the drive. A commemorative sidewalk of brick, inscribed with the names of major donors to the capital campaign, was added between the staircase and the driveway. In addition to the driveway, all the windows in the building (which leaked significant amounts of air and permitted dust to filter inside) were replaced, the north steps were stabilized and repaired, the HVAC system repaired and made functional, the roof repaired, exhibit space renovated, oak trim throughout the building conserved and refinished, and the building's antique light fixtures restored (improving exhibition lighting dramatically). Historically accurate wooden doors replaced the existing doors, and the plaster in the entrance porticos repaired. The driveway and new stairs opened on September 30, 1999. The restoration effort won a Cascade County Historical Society Preservation Award in February 2000 and a Great Falls/Cascade County Historic Preservation Advisory Commission preservation award in May 2002.

At the same time, the museum made changes to its grounds as well. The museum's Pam Marlen Memorial Garden underwent restoration, with new plantings and signage donated by Tilleraas and Forde (a local plant nursery). A new outdoor children's playground (in the museum's colors) was also constructed adjacent to the building's south entrance. American Renovation and Construction Co. donated materials and labor for the playground.

On December 30, 1999, the prestigious Andy Warhol Foundation for the Visual Arts made a $30,000 grant to The Square to support an exhibit of contemporary Native American art, "Material Culture: Innovation in Native Art." Other recipient institutions included the Hirshhorn Museum and Sculpture Garden (part of the Smithsonian Institution), the Museum of Contemporary Art in Los Angeles, and the New Museum of Contemporary Art in New York City.

=== 2000s ===
2000 proved to be a year of change for the museum. In the spring, the Cascade County Historical Society moved into the International Harvester Building (which was renamed the High Plains Heritage Center), which been undergoing a renovation since 1999. The Great Falls Genealogy Society also moved into the new building, giving The Square extensive new space for expansion. But in August 2000, Bonnie Laing-Malcomson resigned as executive director of PGSM to take a job as the executive director of the Oregon College of Art & Craft. Museum curator Jessica Hunter was named interim executive director. In December 2000, The Square won a $138,000 grant to remodel the space vacated by the historical and genealogical societies. The E.L. Wiegand Foundation provided the funds, which expanded the museum's exhibit space to 3,800 square feet (350 m^{2}) from 1,800 square feet (170 m^{2}). Three new galleries were planned to display more of the museum's 500 pieces. These included:

- Northwest Contemporary Art Gallery
- Contemporary Outsider Art Gallery (to house the works of Lee Steen), and
- Photography Gallery.

The grant also provided for renovation and equipping of an Educational Resource Room to house games, art history reference materials, and an interactive kiosk about the Steen works, and for renovation of a second-floor room into a gallery to house artwork held by the Great Falls Clinic. The renovated gallery space opened in August 2001 under a collective name, the E.L. Wiegand East Wing Permanent Collection Galleries.

In April 2003, The Square hired Lynne Spriggs as its permanent executive director. Spriggs' tenure at the museum, which began in September, proved difficult. PPL Montana, the owner of Black Eagle Dam (a hydroelectric dam located in the county), challenged the amount of property taxes assessed on its dam, protesting 10.87 percent of the $4.48 million 2000 tax assessment, 6.5 percent of the $4.8 million 2001 tax assessment, and 85.65 percent of the $4.96 million 2002 tax assessment. This amounted to 30 percent of the $14.2 million property tax assessment from 2000 to 2003 in the state of Montana—with one-third of the amount owed payable solely in Cascade County. Under severe budgetary stress, the county reduced The Square's maintenance budget to $60,720. The county also advised that the mill levy would raise only $157,280 in 2003 (about $22,000 less than the previous year). The historical society asked the county to revise the 1993 agreement so that it would receive more of the mill levy, but the county declined.

In response to the budget cuts, The Square implemented an admission fee in June 2003 for the first time in its history. The $2 admission fee applied only to adults who did not participate in the museum's membership program. (Children under 12 were also exempt.) The Square also cut its operating budget by 3 percent, slashed its travel and staff training budget by 75 percent, and cancelled its janitorial contract. (Existing staff began handling general custodial duties.) In May 2004, with budget pressures continuing, The Square began a new membership drive and fund-raising campaign. New "Patron" and "Benefactor" membership categories were created (with $500 and $2,000 donation categories, roughly double the existing regular membership category). For a limited time, corporate membership in these new categories also provided benefits such as special advertising opportunities. A telephone effort began to offer these new membership categories to people in the county.

The Square won two grants in 2004 which helped eased its budget crisis. In June, the Dufresne Foundation awarded the museum a $100,000 grant for its endowment. The Square said it would work to find donors willing to match the grant, thereby raising $200,000. In September, the Institute of Museum and Library Sciences (a federal grant-making agency), awarded The Square $70,815 to expand its community outreach program. The Square said it would spend another $105,684 to create a combined $176,400 membership and awareness campaign.

In January 2006, Spriggs resigned as executive director of the Paris Gibson Square Museum of Art. Jessica Hunter was again named interim executive director, but she left the museum in June. In July, the museum hired Kathy Lear as its new executive director. Lear had previously served as the museum's director of development from 1997 to 2002, during which the Centennial Campaign raised $1.7 million. Her tenure at the museum began in September 2006.

The museum's financial condition continued to improve after 2006. The museum received a donation from Pacific Steel & Recycling in November which allowed the museum to waive its now-$5 per person admission fee for the next 12 months. In May 2007, the museum won a $12,382 Community Development Block Grant to add Braille and large-print signage throughout the museum, and to make other improvements which would allow the physically disadvantage to access the museum and its programs more fully. In September 2007, Bob Durden was hired as new museum's curator, replacing Jessica Hunter Larsen. His tenure at the museum began in May 2008. The museum rededicated its Pam Marlen Memorial Garden in July 2008 after raising $45,000 in donations to renovate it. The renovations included the planting of native flowers and the construction of picnic tables. Pacific Steel & Recycling renewed its donation (estimated at about $12,000 a year) to keep the museum admission-free in 2007 and 2008. Museum officials said that the donation and the community outreach campaign increased attendance to 25,801 in 2008, up from 16,676 in 2005.

=== 2010s ===
The museum continued to receive major donations in 2009, 2010, and 2011. A $90,000 grant from the Institution of Museum and Library Services, received in August 2009, allowed the museum to hire a full-time staff person to document, organize, photograph, and catalog its permanent collection. The Square said this information would go online. Pacific Steel & Recycling declined to renew its donation in 2009, but in March 2010 Farmers Union Insurance (a local insurance group) stepped forward to make a donation to keep the museum admission-free in 2010. Farmers Union renewed its donation in 2011. A $2,000 grant in October 2011, received from RBC Foundation-USA, was used to fund educational workshops for high school students. The Square said it would link these educational offerings to exhibits at the museum.

Staff turnover plagued the museum in 2011 and 2012. Veteran curator Bob Durden resigned in the fall of 2011. Laura Cotton was hired in March 2012 as his replacement. Executive Director Kathy Lear resigned effective April 5. Tracy Houck was hired full-time as executive director of the museum on November 1, 2012. However, the search for a new executive director was not a timely one. Houck took the reins of The Square too late for planning for the museum's popular Christmas Collection art show to begin. The event was cancelled for 2012, although Houck pledged to bring it back in 2013. In December 2012, the museum faced a major facility crisis. The Square had been aware since early in 2012 that it needed new boilers to replace its two aged heaters. Some fund-raising had already occurred. But on December 30, one of the museum's two boilers failed, and the second boiler came close to failing. The Square applied for an emergency grant from the United States Department of Housing and Urban Development, but the agency argued that block-grant support for city-owned buildings operated by nonprofits did not qualify for the block-grant (which was intended to support public agencies only). there was doubt that the museum would receive it.

== About the museum ==
Paris Gibson Square Museum of Art (The Square) is housed in a Romanesque Revival building made of grey sandstone. The museum has three floors, a basement, and an attic.

Seven galleries with display space for paintings, sculpture, and other art forms occupy the first and second floors. The second floor also includes former classrooms from the building's public school era. The basement is the hub for The Square's Education Department. Art classes for all ages run on a quarterly schedule, with certain other programs and visiting artist workshops occurring at different times year-round.

The museum's collection focuses on contemporary art from artists who live in Montana, the western United States, and western Canada. In 2000, the museum's collection numbered 500 pieces. Due to the lack of a freight elevator and freight doors, the museum is limited in the size and weight of the pieces it may display.

The museum hosts an outdoor sculpture garden, featuring artwork by Robert Harrison, Richard Swanson, Lisa Easton, Theodore Waddell, Janina Myronova, Mike Hollern, and Manel Alvarez. Several memorial markers are located throughout the property, including the Pam Marlen Memorial Garden.

The museum's Free Art Programs include art opportunities for seniors, Veterans, teens, and adults with disabilities. The Square also partners with Great Falls Public Schools to offer free museum tours and a related art activity to all 3rd graders in the district.

In addition to art galleries and classroom space, museum amenities include a gift shop featuring local and Montana artists, and spaces that can be rented for special events.

The museum had roughly 29,000 visitors in 2010.

The museum also hosts an annual art auction fundraiser to support the museum's mission and operations.

=== Governance and staff ===
The museum is governed by a self-perpetuating board of directors. The board elects from among its members a president, vice president, secretary, and treasurer.

The museum has a small staff of nine people as of 2025.

=== Executive Directors ===
Below is a partial list of Executive Directors of the Paris Gibson Museum of Art.

- Elezabeth Carpenter Rak (1977-1980)
- Penelope Lucas (1984 to 1986)
- Vickie Everson (August 1986 to April 1991)
- Elizabeth Kennedy (May 1991 to May 1993)
- Donalee Labar (Interim June 1993 to March 1994)
- Bonnie Laing-Malcomson (March 1994 to August 2000)
- Jessica Hunter (interim, August 2000 to August 2003)
- Lynne Spriggs (September 2003 to January 2006)
- Jessica Hunter Larsen (interim, January 2006 to June 2006)
- Kathy Lear (September 2006 to April 2012)
- Tracy Houck (November 2012 to August 2019)
- Sarah Justice (January 2020 to October 2024)
- Nicole Maria Evans (Interim October 2024 to June 2025)
- Tracy Cosgrove (July 2025 - ongoing)

=== Curators of Collections and Exhibitions ===
- Robert Gabriel (dates undefined)
- Mark Leach (1984 to 1986)
- Cathryn Mallory (July 1986 to September 1991)
- Ruth Franklin and Nona Jane Van Dyke (interim, September 1991 to February 1992)
- Barbara Racker (February 1992 to August 1995)
- Jessica Hunter Larson (1999 to 2006)
- Daniel Biehl (interim, 2007)
- Bob Durden (2007 to 2011)
- Cory Gross (interim, August 2011 to January 2012)
- Laura Cotton (2012 to 2013)
- Kristi Scott (2014 to 2019)
- Nicole Maria Evans (Chief Curator June 2019 to ongoing)

=== Directors of Education ===
- Marilyn Mathews (1988 to 1989)
- Sue Beattie (interim, August 1989 to January 1990)
- Steve Glueckert (February 1990 to July 1991)
- Sue Beattie (interim, August 1991 to January 1992)
- Linda Green (February 1992 to October 1992)
- Sally Newhall (September 1992 to July 1996)
- Susan Thomas (August 1996 to 2004)
- Laura Thompson (2004 to 2025)
- Jenny Yoneji (interim 2025)
- Lisa Gross (interim 2006 to 2008, hired 2008 to 2010)
- Rachel Kaiser (2010 to ?)
- Jeff Kratnik (2014 to 2017)
- Sarah Justice (2017 to 2019)
- William Harning (2020 to 2021)
- Ellie Weber (2021 to 2024)
- Liz Metzger Slot (2024 to ongoing)

== Bibliography ==
- Alberta-Montana Heritage Partnership. Alberta-Montana Discovery Guide: Museums, Parks and Historic Sites. Edmonton: The Partnership, 1997.
- Baumler, Ellen. Montana Chillers: 13 True Tales of Ghosts and Hauntings. Helena, Mont.: Farcountry Press, 2009.
- Bureau of Agriculture, Labor and Industry. Seventh Report of the Bureau of Agriculture, Labor and Industry for the year ended November 30, 1900. Helena, Mont.: Independent Publishing Co., 1900.
- Federal Writers' Project. Montana: A State Guide Book. Washington, D.C.: Federal Works Agency, Work Projects Administration, 1939.
- National Park Service. The National Register of Historic Places. Washington, D.C.: U.S. Government Printing Office, 1976.
- Robison, Ken. Cascade County and Great Falls. Mount Pleasant, S.C.: Arcadia Publishing, 2011.
- Small, Lawrence F. Religion in Montana: Pathways to the Present. Billings, Mont.: Rocky Mountain College, 1992.
- Superintendent of Public Instruction. Biennial Report of the Superintendent of Public Instruction. Vol. II. Montana Department of Public Instruction. Helena, Mont.: Independent Publishing Co., 1903.
