= Flat Willow Colony, Montana =

- Census-designated place
- Location within Montana Location within the United States
- Coordinates: 46°43′31″N 108°29′18″W
- Country: United States
- State: Montana
- County: Musselshell

Area
  - Total: 0.13 sq mi (0.33 km^{2})
  - Land: 0.13 sq mi (0.33 km^{2})
  - Water: 0 sq mi (0.00 km^{2})
- Elevation: 3,511 ft (1,070 m)

Population (2020)
  - Total: 15
  - Density: 117.2/sq mi (45.24/km^{2})
- Time zone: UTC-7 (Mountain (MST))
  - Summer (DST): UTC-6 (MDT)
- ZIP Code: 59072 (Roundup)
- Area code: 406
- FIPS code: 30-26733
- GNIS feature ID: 2806653

Flat Willow Colony is a Hutterite community and census-designated place (CDP) in Musselshell County, Montana, United States. It is in the northern part of the county, 5 miles (8 km) east of U.S. Route 87 and 25 miles (40 km) north-northeast of Roundup, the Musselshell county seat.

The community was first listed as a CDP prior to the 2020 census, at which time it had a population of 15.

== Geography ==
According to the U.S. Census Bureau, the colony has an area of 0.13 square miles (0.34 km^{2}), all land.

== Demographics ==
Historical population
Census	Pop.	Note	%±
2020	15		—
U.S. Decennial Census
