= Camp Three, Montana =

- Census-designated place
- Location in Musselshell County and the state of Montana
- Coordinates: 46°27′12″N 108°34′27″W
- Country: United States
- State: Montana
- County: Musselshell

Area
  - Total: 4.46 sq mi (11.54 km^{2})
  - Land: 4.46 sq mi (11.54 km^{2})
  - Water: 0 sq mi (0.00 km^{2})
- Elevation: 3,324 ft (1,013 m)

Population (2020)
  - Total: 138
  - Density: 31.0/sq mi (11.96/km^{2})
- Time zone: UTC-7 (Mountain (MST))
  - Summer (DST): UTC-6 (MDT)
- ZIP Code: 59072 (Roundup)
- Area code: 406
- FIPS code: 30-11995
- GNIS feature ID: 2407949

Camp Three is a rural census-designated place (CDP) in Musselshell County, Montana, United States. The population was 138 at the 2020 census, down from 173 in 2010.

== Geography ==
The community is in west-central Musselshell County, next to the western border of the city of Roundup, the county seat. U.S. Route 87 runs along the eastern border of the CDP north of Roundup, and Routes 87 and 12 run through the southern part of the CDP after passing through the center of Roundup. The southern border of the CDP follows the Musselshell River, a northeast-flowing tributary of the Missouri River.

According to the U.S. Census Bureau, the Camp Three CDP has a total area of 4.45 square miles (11.5 km^{2}), all land.

== Demographics ==
Historical population
Census	Pop.	Note	%±
2000	138		—
2010	173		25.4%
2020	138		−20.2%
U.S. Decennial Census

As of the census of 2000, there were 138 people, 77 households, and 35 families residing in the CDP. The population density was 31.2 inhabitants per square mile (12.0/km^{2}). There were 104 housing units at an average density of 23.5 per square mile (9.1/km^{2}). The racial makeup of the CDP was 95.65% White, 1.45% Native American, 1.45% Asian, and 1.45% from two or more races. Hispanic or Latino of any race were 0.72% of the population.

There were 77 households, out of which 11.7% had children under the age of 18 living with them, 39.0% were married couples living together, 3.9% had a female householder with no husband present, and 54.5% were non-families. 45.5% of all households were made up of individuals, and 20.8% had someone living alone who was 65 years of age or older. The average household size was 1.79 and the average family size was 2.49.

In the CDP, the population was spread out, with 11.6% under the age of 18, 6.5% from 18 to 24, 23.2% from 25 to 44, 34.8% from 45 to 64, and 23.9% who were 65 years of age or older. The median age was 51 years. For every 100 females, there were 102.9 males. For every 100 females age 18 and over, there were 100.0 males.

The median income for a household in the CDP was $17,212, and the median income for a family was $30,714. Males had a median income of $18,636 versus $13,750 for females. The per capita income for the CDP was $11,767. There were 11.9% of families and 20.3% of the population living below the poverty line, including 53.8% of under eighteens and 4.7% of those over 64.
