= Roundup Airport =

Airport in Montana, US

- IATA: RPX; ICAO: KRPX; FAA LID: RPX

Summary
- Airport type: Public
- Owner: City of Roundup & Musselshell County
- Serves: Roundup, Montana
- Elevation AMSL: 3,490 ft / 1,064 m
- Coordinates: 46°28′30″N 108°32′36″W
- Interactive map of Roundup Airport

Runways
Direction	Length		Surface
Direction	ft	m	Surface
7/25	5,099	1,554	Asphalt
15/33	2,458	749	Turf/dirt

Statistics (2012)
- Aircraft operations: 5,300
- Based aircraft: 10
- Source: Federal Aviation Administration

Roundup Airport (IATA: RPX, ICAO: KRPX, FAA LID: RPX) is a public use airport located two nautical miles (4 km) north of the central business district of Roundup, a city in Musselshell County, Montana, United States. It is owned by the city and county. This airport is included in the National Plan of Integrated Airport Systems for 2011–2015, which categorized it as a general aviation facility.

== Facilities and aircraft ==
Roundup Airport covers an area of 367 acres (149 ha) at an elevation of 3,490 feet (1,064 m) above mean sea level. It has two runways: 7/25 is 5,099 by 75 feet (1,554 x 23 m) with an asphalt surface; 15/33 is 2,460 by 100 feet (750 x 30 m) with a turf/dirt surface.

For the 12-month period ending 16 July 2012, the airport had 5,300 aircraft operations, an average of 14 per day: 94% general aviation and 6% air taxi. At that time there were 10 aircraft based at this airport: 90% single-engine and 10% multi-engine.

== See also ==
- List of airports in Montana
