= Bull Mountains =

Mountain range in Montana, United States

- Location within Montana

Highest point
- Peak: Dunn Mountain, Yellowstone County
- Elevation: 4,744 ft (1,446 m)
- Coordinates: 46°14′43″N 108°20′32″W

Geography
- Country: United States
- State: Montana
- Region: Central Montana
- Range coordinates: 46°19′N 108°19′W

The Bull Mountains are a mountain range of the Rocky Mountains located in Yellowstone and Musselshell Counties in the U.S. state of Montana, lying northeast of Billings and south of Roundup. At an elevation of 3,845 feet (1,172 m), they are a lower elevation mountain range compared to other ranges in the same geographic region. Vegetation consists primarily of grassy meadows, tracts of sagebrush, and ponderosa pine forests, with the western half of the range being slightly more forested than the eastern half of the range. While the Bull Mountains are decent habitat for mule deer, Merriam's turkeys, bobcats, mountain lions, and elk, hunting and other recreational activities are limited, as there is little public land in the range.

== See also ==
- List of mountain ranges in Montana
