= Lee Steen =

American sculptor (1897–1975)

Lee Speck Steen
- Born: December 12, 1897; Kentucky, U.S.
- Died: November 29, 1975; Montana, U.S.
- Known for: sculpture

Lee Steen (1897–1975) was an American sculptor. Using cottonwood tree branches and other found objects, he, along with his twin brother Dee Steen, created an elaborate visionary environment at their home in Roundup, Montana.

== Life ==
Steen was born in Kentucky in 1897, but moved with his family to Montana when only a year old. As a younger man, he worked in Washington state for a railroad, and for the Works Progress Administration before returning to Roundup, where both he and Dee settled down. Steen intermittently found employment as a cook, but largely existed "on the edges of society".

Using wood sourced from the cottonwood trees growing along the Musselshell River, Steen created a large number of "tree people", humanoid figures given additional features with found objects including coffee cans, bottlecaps, and beer tabs. Some of these sculptures were sold to tourists and passers-by; others were placed around his property. Steen's yard was further filled with discarded junk, tamed wild animals, and artworks made by Dee out of metal and automobile parts.

Dee Steen died in 1966, and the environment the brothers had built began to fall into disrepair. Lee Steen left the property in 1972, spending his final years in a nursing home.

John A. Armstrong, of the Yellowstone Art Center, and Jim Todd, of the University of Montana, took an interest in Steen's work, and organized an exhibition thereof in 1973. Armstrong arranged for the preservation of some of Steen's work, and removed some pieces of it to Arizona. Many of the remaining pieces were given to the Paris Gibson Square Museum of Art in Great Falls, Montana; a new wing of the museum was constructed in 1996 to house the sculptures.

== Work ==
The Paris Gibson Square Museum describes Steen's work as "possess[ing] a magical quality that defies precise definition".

Steen's work is discussed in the 2016 edition of Montana Curiosities.
