= Elizabeth Pilant =

American professor (1905–1987)

- Elizabeth Pilant, from the 1948 yearbook of Ball State University
- Born: Elizabeth Hope Carter; June 26, 1905; Montana, U.S.
- Died: April 27, 1987 (age 81); Fallon, Nevada, U.S.
- Occupations: Educational psychologist, folklorist, college professor

Elizabeth Hope Carter Pilant (June 26, 1905 – April 27, 1987) was an American educational psychologist and folklorist, a professor of English on the faculty at Ball State University from 1947 to 1971.

== Early life and education ==
Carter was born on her family's ranch in Yellowstone County, Montana, one of the six daughters of Elmer Bela Carter and Laura May Edwards Carter. Her father died in 1915; her mother was a school teacher. She graduated from the University of Washington in 1928, and earned a master's degree from the University of Hawaiʻi at Mānoa in 1931. Her master's thesis was titled "O. Henry: The Sultan of the Short Story". She completed an Ed.D. in educational psychology at the University of California in 1939, with a dissertation titled "The interest of adolescents in physical, mechanical-scientific, and intellectual-cultural pursuits: A cumulative and comparative study". She pursued further studies at the University of Colorado and American University.

== Career ==
Carter started her career teaching at Ventura Junior College and the University of Utah. After that she became dean of women at Western Illinois University. During World War II, she worked for the overseas division of the American Red Cross. She was a professor of English at Ball State University for over twenty years, from 1947 until she retired in 1971.

Carter specialized in children's literature and American folklore. In 1949 she organized a national conference on American folklore for children, and started a national organization for the study of folklore and pedagogy. In 1950, she spoke at the American Folklore Society's meeting in Berkeley. She traveled the world as a lecturer on folklore for the USAID in 1954, and was known for her collections of jewelry and home furnishings from all over the world. She was a member of Pi Lambda Theta.

== Publications ==
Pilant's research and essays were published in academic journals including Western Folklore, The Social Studies, The School Review, The Clearing House, English Journal, Peabody Journal of Education and Elementary English.

- Sky Bears (poetry)
- "The Dowser in the Ozarks" (1950)
- "Predicting Adult Opinion from Child Opinion" (1950)
- "So You Want to Individualize Instruction?" (1950)
- "Trigger Words: They Start the Themes Rolling" (1951)
- "American Folklore for Remedial Reading" (1951)
- "Student Group-Discipline" (1953)
- "Family Folklore" (1953)
- "Do We Over-Emphasize Current Events?" (1953)
- "American Folk Literature for Children" (1954)
- "Display Devices for Children's Literature" (1954)

== Personal life ==
Carter married Richard Pilant, who was known for his successful campaign to establish a memorial to George Washington Carver. She died in 1987, at the age of 81, in Fallon, Nevada.
