= Musselshell County, Montana =

County in Montana, United States

- County
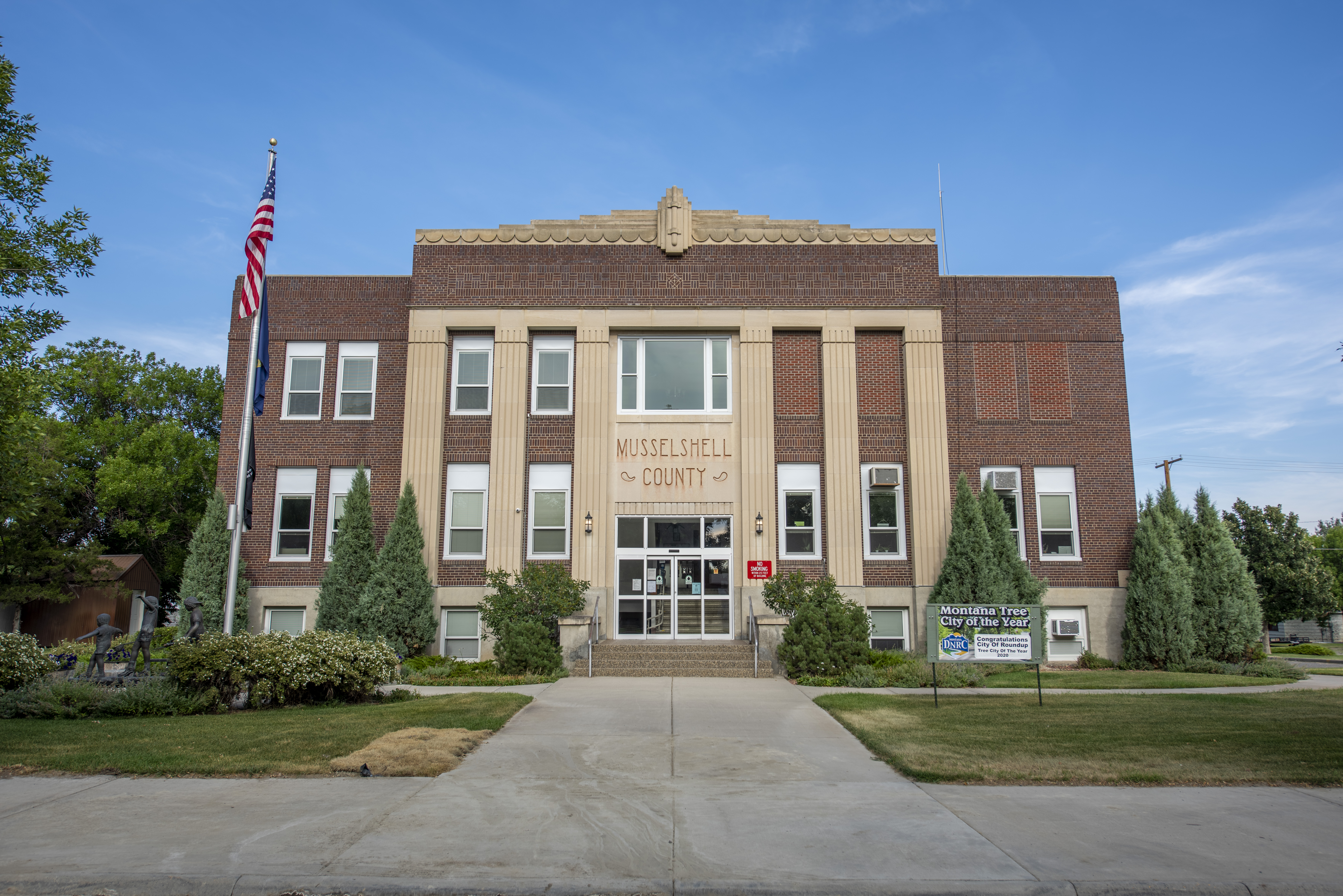
- The Musselshell County Courthouse in Roundup

- Location within the U.S. state of Montana
- Coordinates: 46°29′N 108°24′W
- Country: United States
- State: Montana
- Founded: February 2, 1911
- Seat: Roundup
- Largest city: Roundup

Area
  - Total: 1,871 sq mi (4,850 km^{2})
  - Land: 1,868 sq mi (4,840 km^{2})
  - Water: 2.8 sq mi (7.3 km^{2}) 0.1%

Population (2020)
  - Total: 4,730
  - Estimate (2025): 5,582 ▲
  - Density: 3/sq mi (1.2/km^{2})
- Time zone: UTC−7 (Mountain)
  - Summer (DST): UTC−6 (MDT)
- Congressional district: 2nd
- Website: musselshellcounty.gov
- Montana county number 23

Musselshell County is a county in south-central Montana. As of the 2020 census, the population was 4,730. Its county seat is Roundup.

== History ==
Musselshell County was created in 1911 by Montana Governor Edwin L. Norris. The area was taken from Fergus, Yellowstone, and Meagher counties. It was named for the Musselshell River which runs southwest–northeast through the county. That river had been thus named in 1805 by the Lewis and Clark Expedition, due to the abundance of freshwater mussels found along its banks. In 1915, a western portion of the county was partitioned off to form Golden Valley County, giving Musselshell County its present boundaries.

The county's northwestern area is rolling grasslands, which slope southeastward to the Musselshell River and the forested Bull Mountains in the southeast. The county has abundant natural resources of coal deposits, subterranean oil, and timbered slopes.

== Geography ==
According to the United States Census Bureau, the county has a total area of 1,863.91 square miles (4,827.5 km^{2}), of which 1,861.16 square miles (4,820.4 km^{2}) is land and 2.75 square miles (7.1 km^{2}) (0.1%) is water.

=== Major highways ===
- U.S. Highway 12
- U.S. Highway 87

=== Adjacent counties ===
- Fergus County - northwest
- Petroleum County - north
- Rosebud County - east
- Yellowstone County - south
- Golden Valley County - west

=== National protected area ===
- Lake Mason National Wildlife Refuge

== Demographics ==
Historical population
Census	Pop.	Note	%±
1920	12,030		—
1930	7,242		−39.8%
1940	5,717		−21.1%
1950	5,408		−5.4%
1960	4,888		−9.6%
1970	3,734		−23.6%
1980	4,428		18.6%
1990	4,106		−7.3%
2000	4,497		9.5%
2010	4,538		0.9%
2020	4,730		4.2%
2025 (est.)	5,582	▲	18.0%
U.S. Decennial Census:

=== 2020 census ===
As of the 2020 census, the county had a population of 4,730. Of the residents, 19.2% were under the age of 18 and 27.3% were 65 years of age or older; the median age was 51.3 years. For every 100 females there were 104.1 males, and for every 100 females age 18 and over there were 105.2 males. 0.0% of residents lived in urban areas and 100.0% lived in rural areas.

The racial makeup of the county was 91.7% White, 0.1% Black or African American, 2.2% American Indian and Alaska Native, 0.5% Asian, 0.8% from some other race, and 4.5% from two or more races. Hispanic or Latino residents of any race comprised 3.1% of the population.

There were 2,070 households in the county, of which 22.4% had children under the age of 18 living with them and 20.1% had a female householder with no spouse or partner present. About 31.2% of all households were made up of individuals and 16.8% had someone living alone who was 65 years of age or older.

There were 2,633 housing units, of which 21.4% were vacant. Among occupied housing units, 77.2% were owner-occupied and 22.8% were renter-occupied. The homeowner vacancy rate was 3.0% and the rental vacancy rate was 8.3%.

=== 2010 census ===
As of the 2010 census, there were 4,538 people, 2,046 households, and 1,276 families in the county. The population density was 2.4 inhabitants per square mile (0.93/km^{2}). There were 2,654 housing units at an average density of 1.4 units per square mile (0.54 units/km^{2}). The racial makeup of the county was 96.1% white, 1.3% American Indian, 0.2% black or African American, 0.2% Asian, 0.2% from other races, and 1.9% from two or more races. Those of Hispanic or Latino origin made up 2.6% of the population. In terms of ancestry, 28.1% were German, 16.5% were English, 16.1% were Irish, 7.6% were Norwegian, and 7.0% were American.

Of the 2,046 households, 23.2% had children under the age of 18 living with them, 52.4% were married couples living together, 6.5% had a female householder with no husband present, 37.6% were non-families, and 33.5% of all households were made up of individuals. The average household size was 2.19 and the average family size was 2.78. The median age was 49.1 years.

The median income for a household in the county was $37,033 and the median income for a family was $47,860. Males had a median income of $33,182 versus $25,750 for females. The per capita income for the county was $20,875. About 14.1% of families and 17.8% of the population were below the poverty line, including 28.6% of those under age 18 and 9.6% of those age 65 or over.

== Politics ==
In the fourteen national elections after its organization, Musselshell County voters selected Republican presidential candidates 50% of the time, and Democratic candidates 50% of the time. However, since the 1968 election, the Republican candidate has been selected in every election.

United States presidential election results for Musselshell County, Montana
Year	Republican		Democratic		Third party(ies)	
Year	No.	%	No.	%	No.	%
1912	483	30.80%	470	29.97%	615	39.22%
1916	1,738	42.92%	2,036	50.28%	275	6.79%
1920	1,910	59.22%	951	29.49%	364	11.29%
1924	1,488	45.55%	247	7.56%	1,532	46.89%
1928	1,608	50.55%	1,444	45.39%	129	4.06%
1932	1,021	35.95%	1,584	55.77%	235	8.27%
1936	771	25.58%	2,092	69.41%	151	5.01%
1940	1,086	36.79%	1,807	61.21%	59	2.00%
1944	1,004	42.27%	1,342	56.51%	29	1.22%
1948	1,010	40.46%	1,188	47.60%	298	11.94%
1952	1,253	50.08%	1,240	49.56%	9	0.36%
1956	1,165	51.10%	1,115	48.90%	0	0.00%
1960	1,107	50.09%	1,100	49.77%	3	0.14%
1964	823	40.90%	1,189	59.10%	0	0.00%
1968	953	51.15%	795	42.67%	115	6.17%
1972	1,202	61.11%	689	35.03%	76	3.86%
1976	1,117	54.09%	922	44.65%	26	1.26%
1980	1,279	58.03%	784	35.57%	141	6.40%
1984	1,541	65.32%	781	33.11%	37	1.57%
1988	1,280	58.08%	898	40.74%	26	1.18%
1992	876	39.32%	648	29.08%	704	31.60%
1996	1,121	54.00%	652	31.41%	303	14.60%
2000	1,582	71.68%	512	23.20%	113	5.12%
2004	1,663	74.01%	538	23.94%	46	2.05%
2008	1,581	68.56%	636	27.58%	89	3.86%
2012	1,833	76.15%	492	20.44%	82	3.41%
2016	1,967	80.58%	332	13.60%	142	5.82%
2020	2,423	84.10%	413	14.34%	45	1.56%
2024	2,550	84.66%	396	13.15%	66	2.19%

== Communities ==
=== City ===
- Roundup (county seat)

=== Town ===
- Melstone

=== Unincorporated communities ===
- Delphia
- Elso
- Klein
- Queens Point

== Census-designated places ==
- Camp Three
- Flat Willow Colony
- Kilby Butte Colony
- Klein
- Musselshell

== See also ==
- List of lakes in Musselshell County, Montana
- List of mountains in Musselshell County, Montana
- National Register of Historic Places listings in Musselshell County, Montana
