= KLMB (FM) =

- Klein, Montana; United States
- Frequency: 99.9 MHz
- Branding: "KLMB 99.9 FM Roundup"

Programming
- Format: Community radio

Ownership
- Owner: Edwards Broadcasting; (Bill Edwards)

History
- Former call signs: KTRO (2013); KZMO (2013–2017)

Technical information
- Licensing authority: FCC
- Facility ID: 183371
- Class: C3
- ERP: 5,000 watts
- HAAT: 142 metres (466 ft)
- Transmitter coordinates: 46°15′02.5″N 108°29′02.6″W

Links
- Public license information: Public file; LMS
- Webcast: Listen Live
- Website: klmb99fm.com

KLMB (99.9 FM) is a radio station licensed to serve the community of Klein, Montana. The station is owned by Bill Edwards' Edwards Broadcasting, and airs a community radio format.

The station was assigned the call sign KTRO by the Federal Communications Commission on March 9, 2013. The station changed its call sign to KZMO on September 17, 2013, and to KLMB on April 29, 2017.
