= Roundup, Montana =

City in the United States

- City
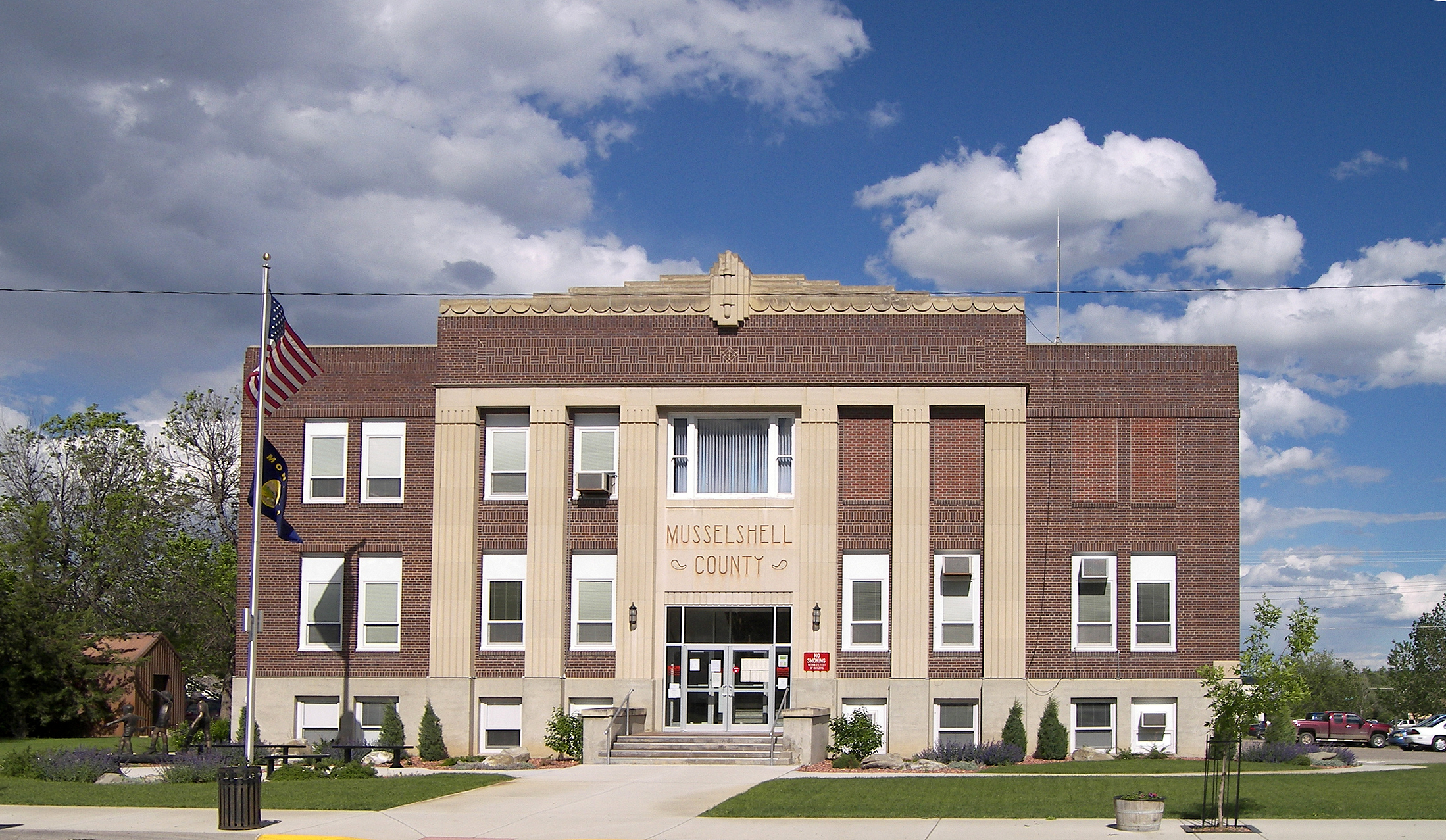
- Musselshell County Courthouse

- Location in Musselshell County and the state of Montana
- Coordinates: 46°26′54″N 108°32′25″W
- Country: United States
- State: Montana
- County: Musselshell

Area
  - Total: 1.29 sq mi (3.35 km^{2})
  - Land: 1.29 sq mi (3.35 km^{2})
  - Water: 0 sq mi (0.00 km^{2})
- Elevation: 3,229 ft (984 m)

Population (2020)
  - Total: 1,742
  - Density: 1,347/sq mi (520.1/km^{2})
- Time zone: UTC−7 (Mountain (MST))
  - Summer (DST): UTC−6 (MDT)
- ZIP codes: 59072-59073
- Area code: 406
- FIPS code: 30-64525
- GNIS feature ID: 2411006
- Website: www.roundupmontana.net

Roundup is a city in and the county seat of Musselshell County, Montana, United States. The population was 1,742 as of the 2020 census.

The city was incorporated in 1909. It has a Commissioner-Executive form of government.

== History ==
Roundup served as a place for cattlemen to "round up" their cattle along the Musselshell River. It was the trailhead in the Great Montana Centennial Cattle Drive, and now drives happen annually.

The post office opened in 1883. In 1907, the Milwaukee Road reached Roundup.

From Hell to Breakfast in Old Montana, by Leland Blanchard, tells the story of pioneers who lived and worked in Roundup in the early 1900s.

== Geography ==
Roundup is located in west-central Musselshell County. U.S. Routes 12 and 87 pass through the city. US 12 leads east 102 miles (164 km) to Forsyth and west 69 miles (111 km) to Harlowton, while US 87 leads northwest 75 miles (121 km) to Lewistown and south 49 miles (79 km) to Billings. The two highways pass through Roundup as Main Street and 1st Avenue West.

According to the U.S. Census Bureau, the city has a total area of 1.29 square miles (3.34 km^{2}), all land. The southern border of the city follows the north bank of the Musselshell River, an east- and then north-flowing tributary of the Missouri River. The Bull Mountains rise to the south of Roundup.

=== Climate ===
According to the Köppen Climate Classification system, Roundup has a cold semi-arid climate, abbreviated "BSk" on climate maps.

Climate data for Roundup, Montana, 1991–2020 normals, extremes 1914–2019
Month	Jan	Feb	Mar	Apr	May	Jun	Jul	Aug	Sep	Oct	Nov	Dec	Year
Record high °F (°C)	70 (21)	75 (24)	82 (28)	91 (33)	100 (38)	106 (41)	111 (44)	108 (42)	102 (39)	95 (35)	77 (25)	70 (21)	111 (44)
Mean maximum °F (°C)	58.2 (14.6)	61.9 (16.6)	70.3 (21.3)	80.4 (26.9)	87.4 (30.8)	96.0 (35.6)	100.1 (37.8)	98.8 (37.1)	93.3 (34.1)	82.0 (27.8)	67.6 (19.8)	57.1 (13.9)	101.6 (38.7)
Mean daily maximum °F (°C)	37.2 (2.9)	40.7 (4.8)	50.6 (10.3)	59.9 (15.5)	69.1 (20.6)	78.3 (25.7)	88.9 (31.6)	87.9 (31.1)	76.9 (24.9)	60.9 (16.1)	46.6 (8.1)	37.2 (2.9)	61.2 (16.2)
Daily mean °F (°C)	25.1 (−3.8)	27.8 (−2.3)	36.3 (2.4)	44.9 (7.2)	54.2 (12.3)	63.1 (17.3)	71.2 (21.8)	69.5 (20.8)	59.6 (15.3)	46.3 (7.9)	34.2 (1.2)	25.7 (−3.5)	46.5 (8.1)
Mean daily minimum °F (°C)	13.1 (−10.5)	14.9 (−9.5)	22.1 (−5.5)	30.0 (−1.1)	39.3 (4.1)	47.8 (8.8)	53.5 (11.9)	51.1 (10.6)	42.4 (5.8)	31.7 (−0.2)	21.8 (−5.7)	14.2 (−9.9)	31.8 (−0.1)
Mean minimum °F (°C)	−13.3 (−25.2)	−8.7 (−22.6)	−2.5 (−19.2)	17.7 (−7.9)	27.4 (−2.6)	37.1 (2.8)	44.9 (7.2)	41.6 (5.3)	28.8 (−1.8)	16.0 (−8.9)	0.4 (−17.6)	−12.5 (−24.7)	−24.3 (−31.3)
Record low °F (°C)	−41 (−41)	−52 (−47)	−33 (−36)	−9 (−23)	10 (−12)	31 (−1)	36 (2)	30 (−1)	15 (−9)	−10 (−23)	−36 (−38)	−44 (−42)	−52 (−47)
Average precipitation inches (mm)	0.37 (9.4)	0.42 (11)	0.71 (18)	1.71 (43)	2.55 (65)	2.89 (73)	1.70 (43)	1.21 (31)	1.20 (30)	1.22 (31)	0.49 (12)	0.41 (10)	14.88 (376.4)
Average snowfall inches (cm)	5.2 (13)	3.9 (9.9)	4.4 (11)	1.4 (3.6)	0.1 (0.25)	0.0 (0.0)	0.0 (0.0)	0.0 (0.0)	0.0 (0.0)	1.0 (2.5)	2.8 (7.1)	5.6 (14)	24.4 (61.35)
Average precipitation days (≥ 0.01 in)	4.0	3.6	5.1	7.7	10.0	10.6	7.0	5.1	5.3	6.9	3.9	4.5	73.7
Average snowy days (≥ 0.1 in)	3.2	2.8	1.9	0.7	0.1	0.0	0.0	0.0	0.0	0.5	1.7	3.4	14.3
Source 1: NOAA
Source 2: National Weather Service (mean maxima and minima 1981–2010)

== Demographics ==
Historical population
Census	Pop.	Note	%±
1910	1,513		—
1920	2,434		60.9%
1930	2,577		5.9%
1940	2,644		2.6%
1950	2,856		8.0%
1960	2,842		−0.5%
1970	2,116		−25.5%
1980	2,119		0.1%
1990	1,808		−14.7%
2000	1,931		6.8%
2010	1,788		−7.4%
2020	1,742		−2.6%
U.S. Decennial Census

=== 2020 census ===
As of the 2020 census, Roundup had a population of 1,742. The median age was 47.5 years. 20.6% of residents were under the age of 18 and 23.4% of residents were 65 years of age or older. For every 100 females there were 99.1 males, and for every 100 females age 18 and over there were 99.0 males age 18 and over.

0.0% of residents lived in urban areas, while 100.0% lived in rural areas.

There were 778 households in Roundup, of which 24.3% had children under the age of 18 living in them. Of all households, 42.3% were married-couple households, 23.7% were households with a male householder and no spouse or partner present, and 27.0% were households with a female householder and no spouse or partner present. About 37.7% of all households were made up of individuals and 16.7% had someone living alone who was 65 years of age or older.

There were 937 housing units, of which 17.0% were vacant. The homeowner vacancy rate was 5.0% and the rental vacancy rate was 9.0%.

Racial composition as of the 2020 census
Race	Number	Percent
White	1,576	90.5%
Black or African American	2	0.1%
American Indian and Alaska Native	50	2.9%
Asian	12	0.7%
Native Hawaiian and Other Pacific Islander	3	0.2%
Some other race	12	0.7%
Two or more races	87	5.0%
Hispanic or Latino (of any race)	67	3.8%

=== 2010 census ===
As of the census of 2010, there were 1,788 people, 814 households, and 445 families residing in the city. The population density was 1,334.3 inhabitants per square mile (515.2/km^{2}). There were 973 housing units at an average density of 726.1 per square mile (280.3/km^{2}). The racial makeup of the city was 95.7% White, 0.3% African American, 1.3% Native American, 0.1% Asian, 0.2% from other races, and 2.4% from two or more races. Hispanic or Latino people of any race were 4.1% of the population.

There were 814 households, of which 26.3% had children under the age of 18 living with them, 41.5% were married couples living together, 8.6% had a female householder with no husband present, 4.5% had a male householder with no wife present, and 45.3% were non-families. 40.5% of all households were made up of individuals, and 18.2% had someone living alone who was 65 years of age or older. The average household size was 2.17 and the average family size was 2.94.

The median age in the city was 43.6 years. 23.7% of residents were under the age of 18; 6.5% were between the ages of 18 and 24; 21.2% were from 25 to 44; 31.6% were from 45 to 64; and 16.8% were 65 years of age or older. The gender makeup of the city was 48.0% male and 52.0% female.

=== 2000 census ===
As of the census of 2000, there were 1,931 people, 833 households, and 498 families residing in the city. The population density was 1,437.8 inhabitants per square mile (555.1/km^{2}). There were 978 housing units at an average density of 728.2 per square mile (281.2/km^{2}). The racial makeup of the city was 97.05% White, 0.16% African American, 0.78% Native American, 0.10% Asian, 0.47% from other races, and 1.45% from two or more races. Hispanic or Latino people of any race were 2.74% of the population.

There were 833 households, out of which 29.2% had children under the age of 18 living with them, 47.9% were married couples living together, 8.9% had a female householder with no husband present, and 40.1% were non-families. 36.7% of all households were made up of individuals, and 19.7% had someone living alone who was 65 years of age or older. The average household size was 2.25 and the average family size was 2.96.

In the city, the population was spread out, with 25.0% under the age of 18, 6.2% from 18 to 24, 24.3% from 25 to 44, 22.6% from 45 to 64, and 21.9% who were 65 years of age or older. The median age was 42 years. For every 100 females there were 87.3 males. For every 100 females age 18 and over, there were 85.6 males.

The median income for a household in the city was $23,144, and the median income for a family was $31,129. Males had a median income of $25,875 versus $17,011 for females. The per capita income for the city was $15,123. About 13.7% of families and 20.3% of the population were below the poverty line, including 27.4% of those under age 18 and 14.7% of those age 65 or over.

== Economy ==
The area has coal mines, which combined with the agriculture, maintain the economy of the town.

Roundup is a hub in Amazon.com's supply chain with a growing industry of prep centers, or businesses that specialize in packing goods to meet the requirements of Amazon's highly automated warehouses.

== Arts and culture ==
The Musselshell Valley Historical Museum highlights the early settlement of the area. Signal Peak Energy largely funded a coal exhibit. Several recreated locations, such as a hospital, general store, and school, allow visitors to experience life as it was.

Roundup School-Community Library is a public library which serves the area.

== Parks and recreation ==
The Musselshell River on the southern side of town provides the opportunity for fishing. Fish in the river include brown trout, smallmouth bass, and catfish. Other activities are floating the river or harvesting the mussels the river is named for.

Hunting options are plentiful. The area has an abundance of whitetail and mule deer, antelope, and gamebirds. The large number of animals can become a safety hazard, so an annual archery-only hunt is authorized in and around the town after the usual hunting season.

== Education ==
Roundup School District educates students from kindergarten through 12th grade. Roundup High School's team name is the Panthers. In the 2021–2022 school year, 174 students were enrolled in the high school.

== Media ==
The local newspaper is the Roundup Record-Tribune. It is published weekly and serves Musselshell County and the neighboring counties.

There are two radio stations licensed in Roundup. KQLJ-LP is a religious channel affiliated with Three Angels Broadcasting Network. KXEM is also a religious channel. It is part of Your Network of Praise.

The studios for radio station KLMB 99.9 FM are located in Roundup, although the station is licensed in neighboring Klein, Montana.

== Infrastructure ==
U.S. Route 87 passes through the town from north to south while U.S. Route 12 travels east to west.

Roundup Airport is a public use airport located 2 miles (3 km) north of town.

== Notable people ==
- Earl W. Bascom, rodeo pioneer, cowboy artist
- Richard Cebull, Chief Judge, United States District Court for the District of Montana
- Vern Countryman, legal expert on bankruptcy and commercial law; born in Roundup
- Bill Holm, art historian; born in Roundup
- John Milkovich, member of the Louisiana State Senate; reared in Roundup
- Elizabeth Pilant, college professor and folklorist; went to high school in Roundup
- Lee Steen, outsider artist; lived most of his life and worked in Roundup
