= Outline of Idaho =

U.S. state

The flag of Idaho

The seal of Idaho

The location of the state of Idaho in the United States of America

The following outline is provided as an overview of and topical guide to the U.S. state of Idaho:

Idaho – U.S. state in the Rocky Mountain area of the United States. The state's largest city and capital is Boise. Residents are called "Idahoans". Idaho was admitted to the Union on July 3, 1890, as the 43rd state.

== General reference ==
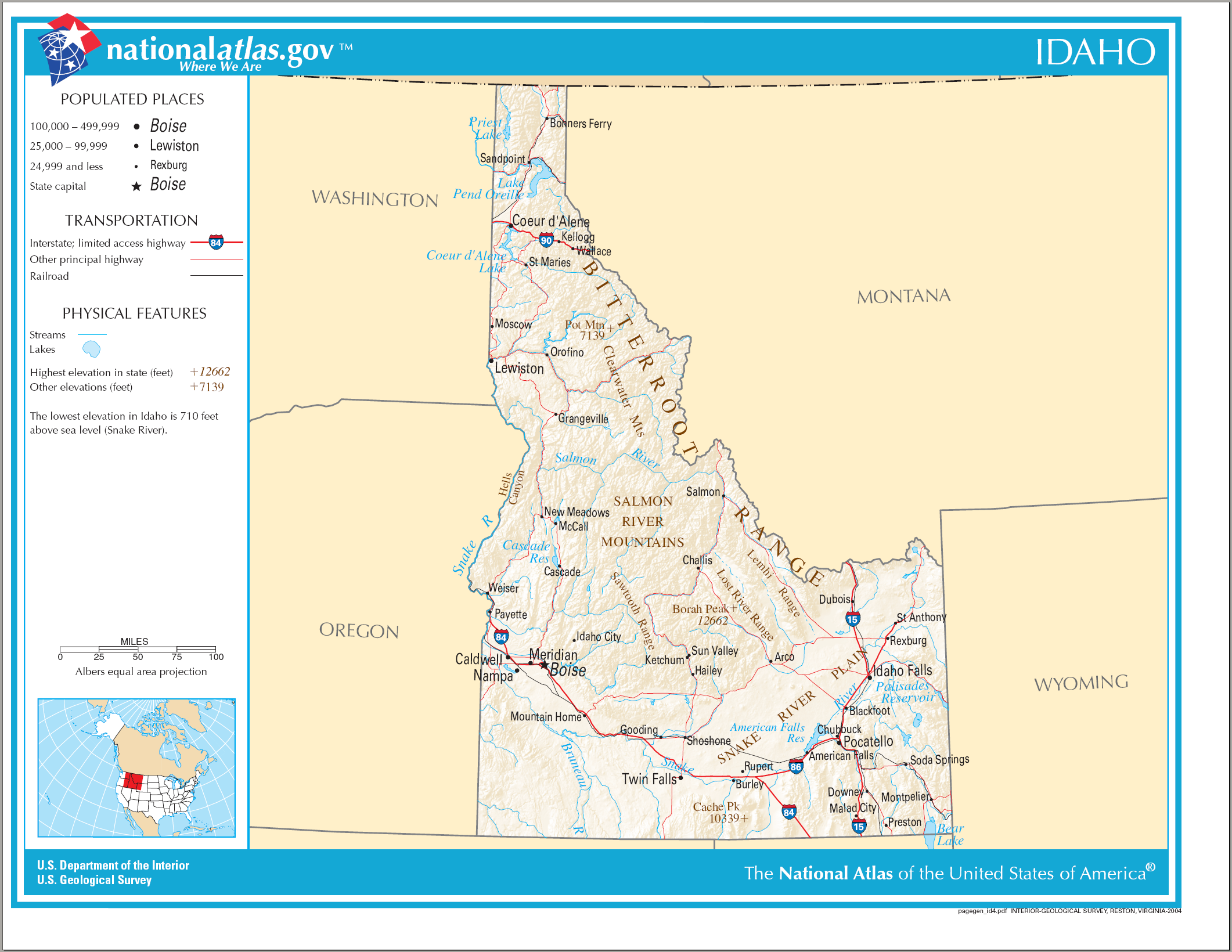
An enlargeable map of the state of Idaho

- Names
  - Common name: Idaho
    - Pronunciation: /ˈaɪdəhoʊ/
  - Official name: State of Idaho
  - Abbreviations and name codes
    - Postal symbol: ID
    - ISO 3166-2 code: US-ID
    - Internet second-level domain: .id.us
  - Nicknames
    - Gem State
    - Gem of the Mountains
    - Little Ida
    - Spud State
- Adjectival: Idaho
- Demonym: Idahoan

== Geography of Idaho ==
Geography of Idaho

- Idaho is: a U.S. state, a federal state of the United States of America
- Location:
  - Northern Hemisphere
  - Western Hemisphere
    - Americas
      - North America
        - Anglo America
        - Northern America
          - United States of America
            - Contiguous United States
              - Canada–US border
              - Western United States
                - Mountain West United States
                - Northwestern United States
          - Pacific Northwest
- Population of Idaho: 1,567,582 (2010 U.S. Census)
- Area of Idaho: 83,569 sq mi (216,444 km^{2})
- Atlas of Idaho

=== Places in Idaho ===
Places in Idaho

- Cemeteries
  - List of cemeteries in Idaho (A-L)
  - List of cemeteries in Idaho (M-Z)
- Historic places in Idaho
  - Ghost towns in Idaho
  - National Historic Landmarks in Idaho
  - National Register of Historic Places listings in Idaho
    - Bridges on the National Register of Historic Places in Idaho
- National Natural Landmarks in Idaho
- National parks in Idaho
- State parks in Idaho

=== Environment of Idaho ===
Environment of Idaho

- Climate of Idaho
- Protected areas in Idaho
  - State forests of Idaho
- Superfund sites in Idaho
- Wildlife of Idaho
  - Fauna of Idaho
    - Birds of Idaho
    - Amphibians and reptiles of Idaho

==== Natural geographic features of Idaho ====
- Geology of Idaho
  - List of mountain ranges in Idaho
  - List of mountains of Idaho
  - List of mountain peaks of Idaho
  - Rivers of Idaho
  - List of lakes in Idaho
  - List of dams and reservoirs in Idaho

=== Regions of Idaho ===
- Central Idaho
- Eastern Idaho
- Northern Idaho
- Southern Idaho
- Southwestern Idaho

==== Administrative divisions of Idaho ====
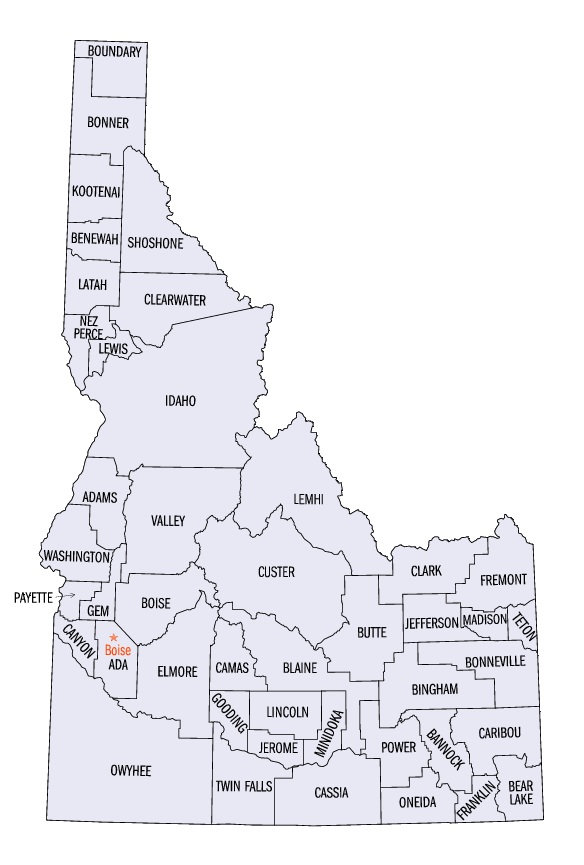
An enlargeable map of the 44 counties of the state of Idaho

- The 44 counties of the state of Idaho
  - Municipalities in Idaho
    - Cities in Idaho
      - State capital of Idaho: Boise
      - Largest city in Idaho: Boise (95th-largest city in the United States)
      - City nicknames in Idaho

=== Demography of Idaho ===
Demographics of Idaho

== Government and politics of Idaho ==
Politics of Idaho

- Form of government: U.S. state government
- Idaho's congressional delegations
- Idaho State Capitol
- Political party strength in Idaho

=== Branches of the government of Idaho ===
Government of Idaho

==== Executive branch of the government of Idaho ====
- Governor of Idaho
  - Lieutenant Governor of Idaho
  - Secretary of State of Idaho
- State departments
  - Idaho Department of Commerce
  - Idaho State Department of Education
  - Idaho Department of Labor
  - Idaho Department of Fish and Game
  - Idaho Department of Juvenile Corrections
  - Idaho Military Department
  - Idaho Department of Transportation

==== Legislative branch of the government of Idaho ====
- Idaho Legislature (bicameral)
  - Upper house: Idaho Senate
  - Lower house: Idaho House of Representatives

==== Judicial branch of the government of Idaho ====
Courts of Idaho

- Supreme Court of Idaho

=== Law and order in Idaho ===
Law of Idaho

- Cannabis in Idaho
- Capital punishment in Idaho
  - Individuals executed in Idaho
- Constitution of Idaho
- Crime in Idaho
- Gun laws in Idaho
- Law enforcement in Idaho
  - Law enforcement agencies in Idaho
    - Idaho State Police

=== Military in Idaho ===
- Idaho Air National Guard
- Idaho Army National Guard

== History of Idaho ==
History of Idaho

=== History of Idaho, by period ===
The location of the state of Idaho in the United States of America

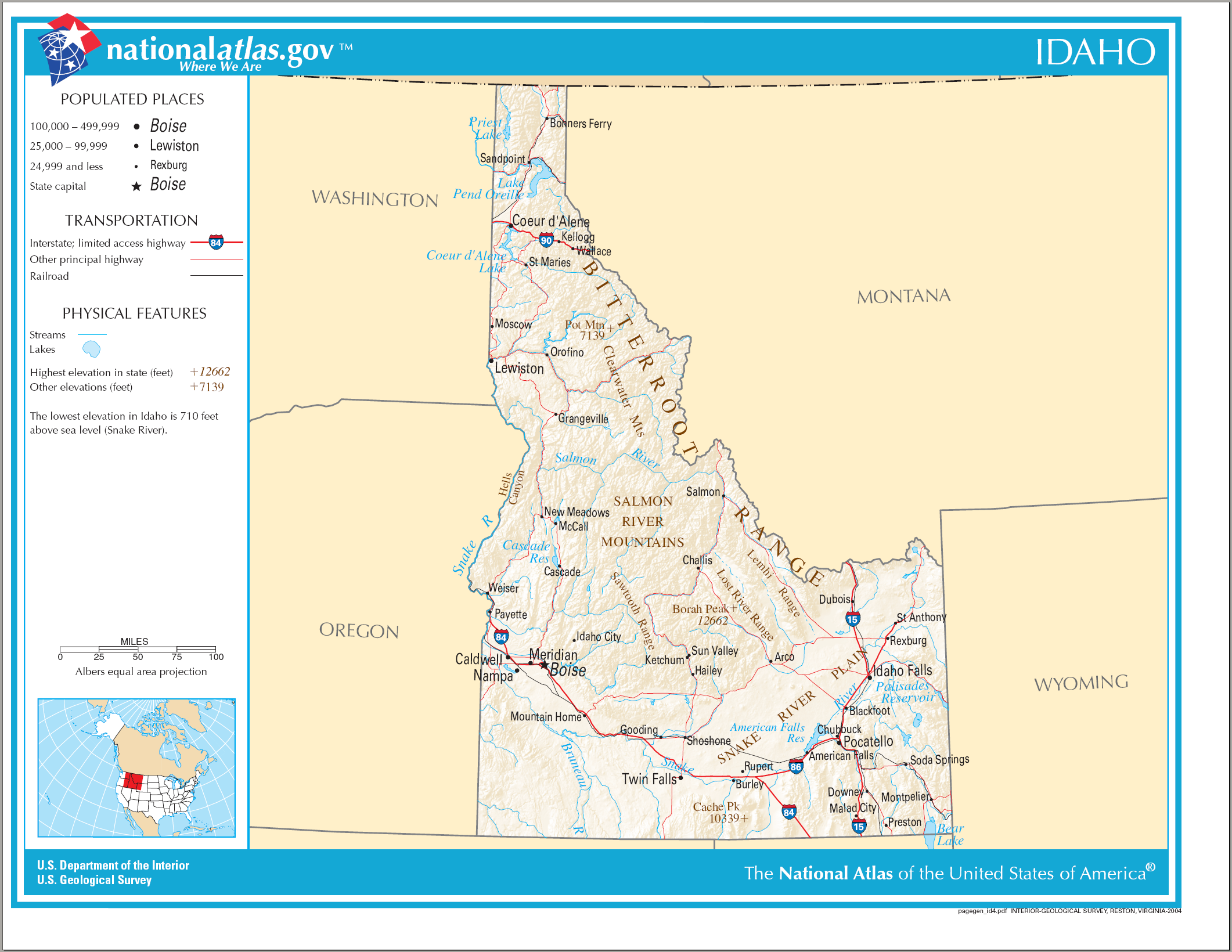
An enlargeable map of the state of Idaho

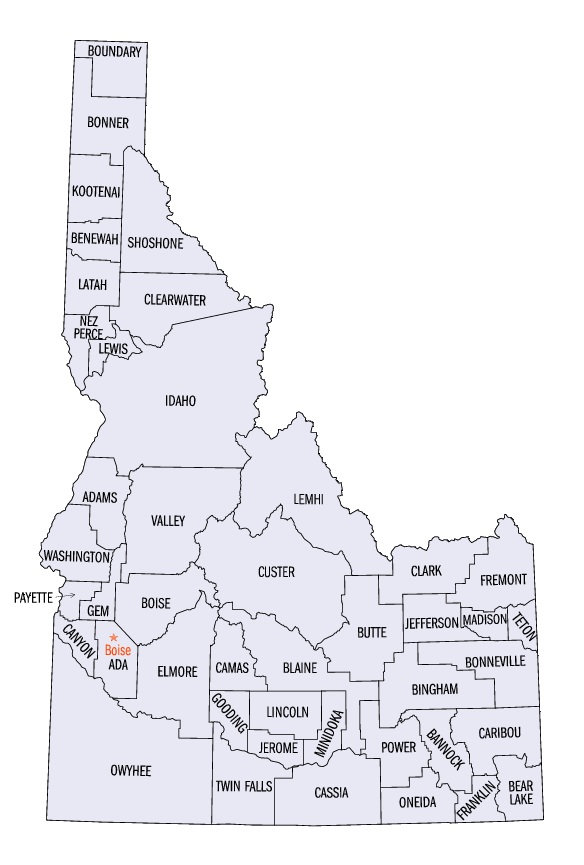
An enlargeable map of the 44 counties of the state of Idaho

- Indigenous peoples
- Lewis and Clark Expedition, 1804–1806
- Oregon Country, 1818–1846
  - Anglo-American Convention of 1818
  - Adams–Onis Treaty of 1819
  - Fort Hall, 1834–1863
  - Oregon Trail, 1841–1869
  - California Trail, 1841–1869
  - Provisional Government of Oregon, 1843–1848
  - Oregon Treaty, June 15, 1846
- Unorganized territory of the United States, 1846–1848
  - Mexican–American War, April 25, 1846 – February 2, 1848
- Territory of Oregon, 1848–1859
- State of Deseret (extralegal), 1849–1850
- Territory of Washington, (1853–1863)-1889
- Territory of Idaho, 1863–1890
  - American Civil War, April 12, 1861 – May 13, 1865
    - Idaho in the American Civil War
  - Yellowstone National Park designated first United States National Park on March 1, 1872
  - Nez Perce War, 1877
  - Bannock War, 1878
- State of Idaho becomes 43rd State admitted to the United States of America on July 3, 1890

=== History of Idaho, by region ===
- History of Boise, Idaho

=== History of Idaho, by subject ===
- Territorial evolution of Idaho

== Culture of Idaho ==
Culture of Idaho

- Museums in Idaho
- Religion in Idaho
  - The Church of Jesus Christ of Latter-day Saints in Idaho
  - Episcopal Diocese of Idaho
- Scouting in Idaho
- State symbols of Idaho
  - Flag of the State of Idaho
  - Great Seal of the State of Idaho

=== The Arts in Idaho ===
- Music of Idaho

=== Sports in Idaho ===
Sports in Idaho

== Economy and infrastructure of Idaho ==
Economy of Idaho

- Agriculture in Idaho
- Communications in Idaho
  - Newspapers in Idaho
  - Radio stations in Idaho
  - Television stations in Idaho
- Energy in Idaho
  - Hydro power in Idaho
  - Power stations in Idaho
  - Solar power in Idaho
  - Wind power in Idaho
- Health care in Idaho
  - Hospitals in Idaho
- Transportation in Idaho
  - Airports in Idaho
  - Railroads in Idaho
  - Roads in Idaho
    - State highways in Idaho

== Education in Idaho ==
Education in Idaho

- Schools in Idaho
  - School districts in Idaho
    - High schools in Idaho
  - Colleges and universities in Idaho
    - Boise State University
    - University of Idaho
    - Idaho State University
    - Lewis–Clark State College

== See also ==
- Topic overview:
  - Idaho
  - Index of Idaho-related articles
