= Environment of Idaho =

The environment of Idaho is rich in ecological diversity. Major forest ecosystems include grand fir-Douglas fir forest, cedar-hemlock-pine forest, Douglas fir forest, western ponderosa pine forest, and western spruce-fir forest. While the northern part of the state is dominated by forests, most of the southern part of the state is covered by sagebrush steppe, interspersed with islands of desert and saltbush-greasewood shrublands.

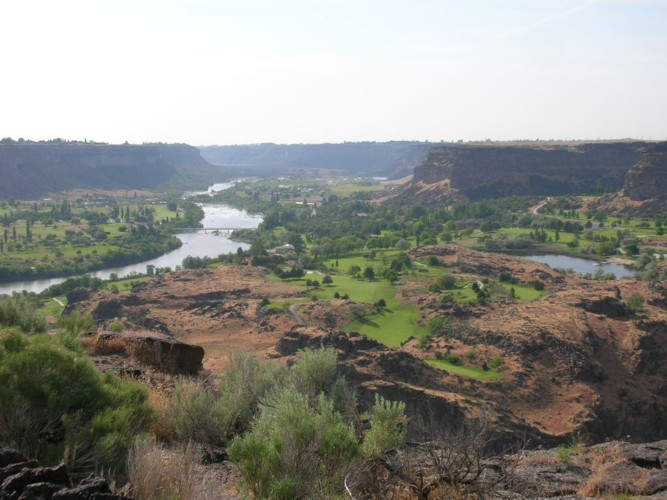
Snake River Canyon

Many areas in the state are nearly pristine and include some of the largest areas in the United States without paved roads.

Significant fish resources include salmon and steelhead.

== Fire ==
Fire plays an important role in several ecosystems, including sagebrush steppe, western juniper woodlands, and ponderosa and lodgepole pine. In many of these ecosystems, fire suppression and other land use policies have resulted in significant changes in forest composition and structure.

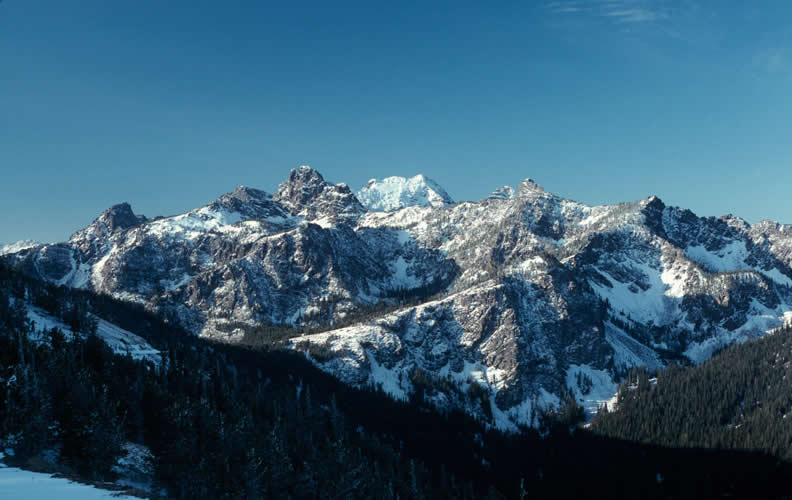
Seven devils

In sagebrush steppe, a greater frequency of fires in the last 50 years has resulted in invasion by annual grasses such as cheatgrass and medusahead. In western juniper woodlands, continued grazing and 50 years of attempted fire exclusion have allowed juniper expansion to continue unchecked. Historically, frequent, low-intensity surface fires perpetuated park-like conditions in ponderosa pine stands. Today, after 60 years of fire suppression, many of these forests, along with lodgepole pine forests, have high densities of trees, are plagued by epidemics of insects and diseases, and are subject to severe stand-destroying fires. Significant changes are also occurring in whitebark pine populations of high-elevation forests. In northern Idaho, stands have decreased by anywhere between 50 and 100%, due in part to fire suppression and white pine blister rust, a non-native fungus that has defied control. Fewer than 1 in 10,000 trees is resistant.

Loss of this forest type may be catastrophic for grizzlies. Even a modest warming and drying could reduce whitebark pine habitat by up to 90%. Whitebark pine nuts and the army cutworm moth caterpillars found in southeastern forests provide vital food for grizzly bears.

== Public parks ==
Yellowstone National Park is one of the region’s protected areas. Its intact grizzly bear habitat, rangelands for buffalo, elk, and moose, and its hot springs and geysers attract millions of visitors per year.

== Climate change ==
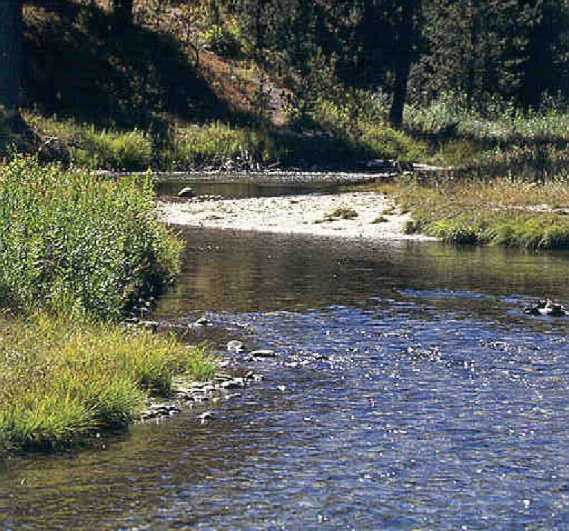
Riparian area in Blaine County, Idaho

Over the last century, the average temperature near Boise, Idaho, has increased nearly 1°F, and precipitation has increased by nearly 20% in many parts of the state, and has declined in other parts of the state by more than 10%. These past trends may or may not continue into the future.

Over the next century, climate in Idaho may experience additional changes. For example, based on projections made by the Intergovernmental Panel on Climate Change and results from the United Kingdom Hadley Centre’s climate model (HadCM2), a model that accounts for both greenhouse gases and aerosols, by 2100 temperatures in Idaho could increase by 5°F (with a range of 2-9°F) in winter and summer and 4°F (with a range of 2-7°F) in spring and fall. Precipitation is estimated to change little in summer, to increase by 10% in spring and fall (with a range of 5-20%), and to increase by 20% in winter (with a range of 10-40%). Other climate models may show different results, especially regarding estimated changes in precipitation. The impacts described in the sections that follow take into account estimates from different models. The amount of precipitation on extreme wet or snowy days in winter is likely to increase. The frequency of extreme hot days in summer would increase because of the general warming trend. It is not clear how the severity of storms might be affected, although an increase in the frequency and intensity of winter storms is possible.

== See also ==
- 2000–2001 fires in the Western United States
- List of Superfund sites in Idaho
