= List of cemeteries in Idaho =

There are at least 314 named cemeteries in Idaho.

Idaho /ˈaɪdəhoʊ/ is a state in the Rocky Mountain area of the United States. Idaho is the 14th most expansive, the 39th most populous, and the 7th least densely populated of the 50 United States.

== Ada County ==
- Cloverdale Memorial Park, Ada County, Idaho, 43°37′5″N 116°19′53″W, el. 2,648 feet (807 m)
- Dry Creek Cemetery, Ada County, Idaho, 43°41′5″N 116°18′15″W, el. 2,687 feet (819 m)
- Fairview Cemetery, Ada County, Idaho, 43°38′5″N 116°29′27″W, el. 2,510 feet (770 m)
- Fort Boise Military Cemetery, Ada County, Idaho, 43°37′5″N 116°10′43″W, el. 2,890 feet (880 m)
- Home of the Peace Cemetery, Ada County, Idaho, 43°42′5″N 116°28′09″W, el. 2,503 feet (763 m)
- Idaho State Veterans Cemetery, Ada County, Idaho, 43°41′5″N 116°18′34″W, el. 2,648 feet (807 m)
- Meridian Cemetery, Ada County, Idaho, 43°36′5″N 116°23′02″W, el. 2,625 feet (800 m)
- Morris Hill Cemetery, Ada County, Idaho, 43°36′5″N 116°13′49″W, el. 2,739 feet (835 m)
- Mountain View Cemetery, Ada County, Idaho, 43°37′5″N 116°17′07″W, el. 2,690 feet (820 m)
- Pioneer Cemetery, Ada County, Idaho, 43°36′5″N 116°11′20″W, el. 2,720 feet (830 m)
- Terrace Lawn Cemetery, Ada County, Idaho, 43°37′5″N 116°20′40″W, el. 2,634 feet (803 m)

== Adams County ==
- Cottonwood Cemetery, Adams County, Idaho, 44°40′5″N 116°26′43″W, el. 3,002 feet (915 m)
- Independent Order of Oddfellows Cemetery, Adams County, Idaho, 44°42′5″N 116°26′38″W, el. 2,943 feet (897 m)
- Indian Valley Cemetery, Adams County, Idaho, 44°34′5″N 116°26′54″W, el. 2,933 feet (894 m)
- Kessler Cemetery, Adams County, Idaho, 44°44′5″N 116°26′27″W, el. 2,930 feet (890 m)
- Meadows Valley Cemetery, Adams County, Idaho, 44°58′5″N 116°14′42″W, el. 3,966 feet (1,209 m)
- Winkler Cemetery, Adams County, Idaho, 44°45′5″N 116°26′43″W, el. 2,963 feet (903 m)

== Bannock County ==
- Downey Cemetery, Bannock County, Idaho, 42°27′5″N 112°05′49″W, el. 5,131 feet (1,564 m)
- Grant Ward Cemetery, Bannock County, Idaho, 42°24′5″N 112°02′17″W, el. 5,285 feet (1,611 m)
- Indian Cemetery, Bannock County, Idaho, 42°58′5″N 112°33′10″W, el. 4,455 feet (1,358 m)
- Inkom Cemetery, Bannock County, Idaho, 42°48′5″N 112°13′39″W, el. 4,744 feet (1,446 m)
- Lava Hot Springs Cemetery, Bannock County, Idaho, 42°36′5″N 112°00′57″W, el. 5,197 feet (1,584 m)
- Marsh Center Cemetery, Bannock County, Idaho, 42°31′5″N 112°11′41″W, el. 4,724 feet (1,440 m)
- Marsh Valley Cemetery, Bannock County, Idaho, 42°25′5″N 112°07′05″W, el. 4,879 feet (1,487 m)
- Mountain View Cemetery, Bannock County, Idaho, 42°51′5″N 112°25′38″W, el. 4,642 feet (1,415 m)
- Robin Cemetery, Bannock County, Idaho, 42°34′5″N 112°15′28″W, el. 4,921 feet (1,500 m)
- Woodland Cemetery, Bannock County, Idaho, 42°26′5″N 112°12′49″W, el. 4,764 feet (1,452 m)

== Bear Lake County ==
- Dingle Cemetery, Bear Lake County, Idaho, 42°12′5″N 111°15′24″W, el. 5,991 feet (1,826 m)
- Geneva Cemetery, Bear Lake County, Idaho, 42°21′5″N 111°05′24″W, el. 6,266 feet (1,910 m)
- Lanark Cemetery, Bear Lake County, Idaho, 42°15′5″N 111°25′08″W, el. 6,060 feet (1,850 m)
- Liberty Cemetery, Bear Lake County, Idaho, 42°19′5″N 111°27′22″W, el. 6,096 feet (1,858 m)
- Nounan Cemetery, Bear Lake County, Idaho, 42°26′5″N 111°26′01″W, el. 5,961 feet (1,817 m)
- Ovid Cemetery, Bear Lake County, Idaho, 42°17′5″N 111°24′15″W, el. 6,017 feet (1,834 m)
- Raymond Cemetery, Bear Lake County, Idaho, 42°17′5″N 111°03′15″W, el. 6,155 feet (1,876 m)
- Skinner Cemetery, Bear Lake County, Idaho, 42°29′5″N 111°26′29″W, el. 6,043 feet (1,842 m)

== Benewah County ==
- Evergreen Cemetery, Benewah County, Idaho, 47°20′5″N 116°54′28″W, el. 2,821 feet (860 m)
- Mountain View Cemetery, Benewah County, Idaho, 47°06′5″N 116°47′46″W, el. 2,736 feet (834 m)
- Sanders Cemetery, Benewah County, Idaho, 47°06′5″N 116°45′55″W, el. 2,933 feet (894 m)
- Woodlawn Cemetery, Benewah County, Idaho, 47°19′5″N 116°35′15″W, el. 2,283 feet (696 m)

== Bingham County ==
- Basalt Cemetery, Bingham County, Idaho, 43°20′5″N 112°09′42″W, el. 4,596 feet (1,401 m)
- Gibson Cemetery, Bingham County, Idaho, 43°07′5″N 112°22′58″W, el. 4,482 feet (1,366 m)
- Good Shepherd Cemetery, Bingham County, Idaho, 43°01′5″N 112°25′35″W, el. 4,462 feet (1,360 m)
- Grove City Cemetery, Bingham County, Idaho, 43°12′5″N 112°19′41″W, el. 4,511 feet (1,375 m)
- Groveland Cemetery, Bingham County, Idaho, 43°13′5″N 112°22′53″W, el. 4,505 feet (1,373 m)
- Hillcrest Cemetery, Bingham County, Idaho, 43°22′5″N 112°07′38″W, el. 4,629 feet (1,411 m)
- Homestead Cemetery, Bingham County, Idaho, 42°54′5″N 112°53′20″W, el. 4,475 feet (1,364 m)
- Moreland Cemetery, Bingham County, Idaho, 43°13′5″N 112°28′12″W, el. 4,472 feet (1,363 m)
- Riverview Cemetery, Bingham County, Idaho, 43°18′5″N 112°11′11″W, el. 4,590 feet (1,400 m)
- Ross Fork Cemetery, Bingham County, Idaho, 43°02′5″N 112°16′32″W, el. 4,964 feet (1,513 m)
- Thomas Riverside Cemetery, Bingham County, Idaho, 43°11′5″N 112°29′05″W, el. 4,459 feet (1,359 m)

== Blaine County ==
- Bellevue Cemetery, Blaine County, Idaho, 43°27′5″N 114°14′52″W, el. 5,213 feet (1,589 m)
- Carey Cemetery, Blaine County, Idaho, 43°19′5″N 113°56′14″W, el. 4,790 feet (1,460 m)
- Galena Pioneer Cemetery, Blaine County, Idaho, 43°51′5″N 114°39′04″W, el. 7,296 feet (2,224 m)
- Sawtooth Cemetery, Blaine County, Idaho, 43°53′5″N 114°49′59″W, el. 7,362 feet (2,244 m)
- Timmerman Cemetery, Blaine County, Idaho, 43°19′5″N 114°17′29″W, el. 4,905 feet (1,495 m)

== Boise County ==
- Boot Hill Cemetery, Boise County, Idaho, 43°49′5″N 115°50′32″W, el. 4,094 feet (1,248 m)
- Garden Valley Pioneer Cemetery, Boise County, Idaho, 44°05′5″N 115°57′34″W, el. 3,195 feet (974 m)
- Idaho City Pioneer Cemetery, Boise County, Idaho, 43°49′5″N 115°50′33″W, el. 4,088 feet (1,246 m)
- Miner Grave, Boise County, Idaho, 43°57′5″N 115°46′39″W, el. 6,171 feet (1,881 m)
- Pioneer Cemetery, Boise County, Idaho, 43°54′5″N 116°11′29″W, el. 2,674 feet (815 m)

== Bonner County ==
- Clara Cemetery, Bonner County, Idaho, 48°02′5″N 116°26′59″W, el. 2,306 feet (703 m)
- Drake Cemetery, Bonner County, Idaho, 48°07′5″N 116°32′34″W, el. 3,360 feet (1,020 m)
- Gold Creek Cemetery, Bonner County, Idaho, 48°24′5″N 116°25′02″W, el. 2,211 feet (674 m)
- Hope Cemetery, Bonner County, Idaho, 48°14′5″N 116°17′52″W, el. 2,287 feet (697 m)
- Lakeview Cemetery, Bonner County, Idaho, 48°15′5″N 116°34′02″W, el. 2,087 feet (636 m)
- Pack River Cemetery, Bonner County, Idaho, 48°22′5″N 116°26′26″W, el. 2,136 feet (651 m)
- Pine Grove Cemetery, Bonner County, Idaho, 48°01′5″N 116°58′51″W, el. 2,306 feet (703 m)
- Pinecrest Cemetery, Bonner County, Idaho, 48°16′5″N 116°35′17″W, el. 2,192 feet (668 m)
- Seneacquoteen Cemetery, Bonner County, Idaho, 48°09′5″N 116°45′32″W, el. 2,136 feet (651 m)
- Westmond Cemetery, Bonner County, Idaho, 48°08′5″N 116°35′59″W, el. 2,247 feet (685 m)

== Bonneville County ==
- Ammon Cemetery, Bonneville County, Idaho, 43°27′5″N 111°55′50″W, el. 4,787 feet (1,459 m)
- Iona Cemetery, Bonneville County, Idaho, 43°29′5″N 111°56′07″W, el. 4,744 feet (1,446 m)
- Lincoln Cemetery, Bonneville County, Idaho, 43°30′5″N 111°59′01″W, el. 4,747 feet (1,447 m)
- Milo Cemetery, Bonneville County, Idaho, 43°36′5″N 111°52′25″W, el. 4,888 feet (1,490 m)
- New Sweden Cemetery, Bonneville County, Idaho, 43°28′5″N 112°06′19″W, el. 4,692 feet (1,430 m)
- Ririe Cemetery, Bonneville County, Idaho, 43°36′5″N 111°47′10″W, el. 4,987 feet (1,520 m)
- Rose Hill Cemetery, Bonneville County, Idaho, 43°28′5″N 112°02′35″W, el. 4,698 feet (1,432 m)
- Swan Valley Cemetery, Bonneville County, Idaho, 43°26′5″N 111°16′52″W, el. 5,417 feet (1,651 m)
- Taylor Cemetery, Bonneville County, Idaho, 43°22′5″N 112°01′10″W, el. 4,688 feet (1,429 m)
- Woodville Cemetery, Bonneville County, Idaho, 43°25′5″N 112°08′51″W, el. 4,642 feet (1,415 m)

== Boundary County ==
- Boulder Creek Cemetery, Boundary County, Idaho, 48°37′5″N 116°03′30″W, el. 2,451 feet (747 m)
- Copeland Cemetery, Boundary County, Idaho, 48°55′5″N 116°22′46″W, el. 2,188 feet (667 m)
- Grandview Cemetery, Boundary County, Idaho, 48°41′5″N 116°17′36″W, el. 2,208 feet (673 m)
- Independent Order of Odd Fellows Cemetery, Boundary County, Idaho, 48°59′5″N 116°29′04″W, el. 2,136 feet (651 m)
- Moravia Cemetery, Boundary County, Idaho, 48°39′5″N 116°22′31″W, el. 1,896 feet (578 m)
- Paradise Valley Cemetery, Boundary County, Idaho, 48°38′5″N 116°18′33″W, el. 2,303 feet (702 m)

== Butte County ==
- Antelope Cemetery, Butte County, Idaho, 43°40′5″N 113°35′48″W, el. 6,197 feet (1,889 m)
- Hillcrest Cemetery, Butte County, Idaho, 43°37′5″N 113°17′06″W, el. 5,328 feet (1,624 m)
- Lost River Cemetery, Butte County, Idaho, 43°41′5″N 113°23′05″W, el. 5,436 feet (1,657 m)

== Camas County ==
- Corral Cemetery, Camas County, Idaho, 43°23′5″N 114°56′38″W, el. 5,203 feet (1,586 m)
- Hill City Cemetery, Camas County, Idaho, 43°18′5″N 115°02′48″W, el. 5,105 feet (1,556 m)
- Manard Cemetery, Camas County, Idaho, 43°16′5″N 114°44′50″W, el. 5,089 feet (1,551 m)
- Mountain View Cemetery, Camas County, Idaho, 43°24′5″N 114°47′25″W, el. 5,292 feet (1,613 m)

== Canyon County ==
- Canyon Hill Cemetery, Canyon County, Idaho, 43°41′5″N 116°40′34″W, el. 2,444 feet (745 m)
- Fargo Cemetery, Canyon County, Idaho, 43°39′5″N 116°55′57″W, el. 2,270 feet (690 m)
- Hillcrest Memorial Gardens, Canyon County, Idaho, 43°36′5″N 116°40′07″W, el. 2,470 feet (750 m)
- Lower Boise Cemetery, Canyon County, Idaho, 43°45′5″N 116°53′04″W, el. 2,303 feet (702 m)
- Mount Calvary Cemetery, Canyon County, Idaho, 43°31′5″N 116°33′14″W, el. 2,539 feet (774 m)
- Parma Cemetery, Canyon County, Idaho, 43°47′5″N 116°57′08″W, el. 2,247 feet (685 m)
- Pleasant Ridge Cemetery, Canyon County, Idaho, 43°39′5″N 116°47′04″W, el. 2,421 feet (738 m)
- Roswell Cemetery, Canyon County, Idaho, 43°44′5″N 116°58′17″W, el. 2,264 feet (690 m)
- Wilder Cemetery, Canyon County, Idaho, 43°40′5″N 116°55′24″W, el. 2,467 feet (752 m)

== Caribou County ==
- Chesterfield Cemetery, Caribou County, Idaho, 42°51′5″N 111°54′17″W, el. 5,403 feet (1,647 m)
- Freedom Cemetery, Caribou County, Idaho, 42°58′5″N 111°03′19″W, el. 5,840 feet (1,780 m)
- Grace Cemetery, Caribou County, Idaho, 42°32′5″N 111°43′48″W, el. 5,515 feet (1,681 m)
- Lago Cemetery, Caribou County, Idaho, 42°26′5″N 111°42′42″W, el. 5,079 feet (1,548 m)
- Lanes Grave Cemetery, Caribou County, Idaho, 42°56′5″N 111°16′55″W, el. 6,699 feet (2,042 m)
- Thatcher Cemetery, Caribou County, Idaho, 42°26′5″N 111°46′32″W, el. 5,059 feet (1,542 m)

== Cassia County ==
- Basin Cemetery, Cassia County, Idaho, 42°13′5″N 113°47′33″W, el. 5,230 feet (1,590 m)
- Bower Cemetery, Cassia County, Idaho, 42°24′5″N 114°10′42″W, el. 4,308 feet (1,313 m)
- Declo Cemetery, Cassia County, Idaho, 42°31′5″N 113°38′01″W, el. 4,209 feet (1,283 m)
- Elba Cemetery, Cassia County, Idaho, 42°14′5″N 113°33′00″W, el. 5,230 feet (1,590 m)
- Jackson Cemetery, Cassia County, Idaho, 42°38′5″N 113°32′25″W, el. 4,193 feet (1,278 m)
- Malta Cemetery, Cassia County, Idaho, 42°18′5″N 113°20′00″W, el. 4,514 feet (1,376 m)
- Marion Cemetery, Cassia County, Idaho, 42°16′5″N 113°55′50″W, el. 4,501 feet (1,372 m)
- Olson Cemetery, Cassia County, Idaho, 42°07′5″N 113°21′33″W, el. 4,813 feet (1,467 m)
- Pella Ward Cemetery, Cassia County, Idaho, 42°28′5″N 113°51′46″W, el. 4,268 feet (1,301 m)
- Pleasant Hill Cemetery, Cassia County, Idaho, 42°24′5″N 113°35′17″W, el. 4,783 feet (1,458 m)
- Pleasant View Cemetery, Cassia County, Idaho, 42°31′5″N 113°46′25″W, el. 4,170 feet (1,270 m)
- Standrod Cemetery, Cassia County, Idaho, location unknown
- Sunny Cedar Rest Cemetery, Cassia County, Idaho, 42°07′5″N 113°37′00″W, el. 5,430 feet (1,660 m)
- View Cemetery, Cassia County, Idaho, 42°26′5″N 113°39′25″W, el. 4,288 feet (1,307 m)

== Clark County ==
- Goddard Cemetery, Clark County, Idaho, 43°59′5″N 112°50′53″W, el. 5,394 feet (1,644 m)
- John Day Cemetery, Clark County, Idaho, 44°08′5″N 112°54′04″W, el. 6,020 feet (1,830 m)
- Kilgore Cemetery, Clark County, Idaho, 44°22′5″N 111°55′27″W, el. 6,325 feet (1,928 m)
- Lewis and Clark Memorial Gardens, Nez Perce County, Idaho, 46°22′5″N 116°59′44″W, el. 1,427 feet (435 m)
- New Kilgore Cemetery, Clark County, Idaho, 44°22′5″N 111°55′55″W, el. 6,306 feet (1,922 m)

== Clearwater County ==
- Fraser Cemetery, Clearwater County, Idaho, 46°22′5″N 116°02′44″W, el. 3,028 feet (923 m)
- Hill Cemetery, Clearwater County, Idaho, 46°28′5″N 116°14′39″W, el. 1,273 feet (388 m)
- Marsh Cemetery, Clearwater County, Idaho, 46°32′5″N 116°00′41″W, el. 3,307 feet (1,008 m)
- Riverside Cemetery, Clearwater County, Idaho, 46°28′5″N 116°15′50″W, el. 1,027 feet (313 m)
- Shoecraft and Gorman Grave Site, Clearwater County, Idaho, 46°40′5″N 115°04′16″W, el. 3,520 feet (1,070 m)
- Three Pines Cemetery, Clearwater County, Idaho, location unknown
- Weippe Cemetery, Clearwater County, Idaho, 46°21′5″N 115°55′58″W, el. 3,015 feet (919 m)
- Wells Cemetery, Clearwater County, Idaho, 46°31′5″N 116°12′36″W, el. 2,769 feet (844 m)
- Weseman Cemetery, Clearwater County, Idaho, 46°30′5″N 116°11′32″W, el. 1,857 feet (566 m)

== Custer County ==
- Barton Cemetery, Custer County, Idaho, 43°58′5″N 113°50′01″W, el. 6,322 feet (1,927 m)
- Battleground Cemetery, Custer County, Idaho, 43°57′5″N 113°42′18″W, el. 6,102 feet (1,860 m)
- Boot Hill Cemetery, Custer County, Idaho, 44°22′5″N 114°44′08″W, el. 6,519 feet (1,987 m)
- Chilly Cemetery, Custer County, Idaho, 44°03′5″N 113°54′43″W, el. 6,375 feet (1,943 m)
- Darlington Cemetery, Custer County, Idaho, 43°48′5″N 113°27′16″W, el. 5,676 feet (1,730 m)
- Houston Cemetery, Custer County, Idaho, 43°52′5″N 113°34′41″W, el. 5,942 feet (1,811 m)
- Mount McCaleb Cemetery, Custer County, Idaho, 43°55′5″N 113°36′15″W, el. 5,902 feet (1,799 m)
- Stanley Cemetery, Custer County, Idaho, 44°12′5″N 114°56′33″W, el. 6,266 feet (1,910 m)

== Elmore County ==
- Mountain View Cemetery, Elmore County, Idaho, 43°08′5″N 115°40′46″W, el. 3,153 feet (961 m)

== Franklin County ==
- Cleveland Cemetery, Franklin County, Idaho, 42°21′5″N 111°44′27″W, el. 5,056 feet (1,541 m)
- Fairview Cemetery, Franklin County, Idaho, 42°01′5″N 111°52′14″W, el. 4,505 feet (1,373 m)
- Franklin Cemetery, Franklin County, Idaho, 42°00′5″N 111°48′58″W, el. 4,514 feet (1,376 m)
- Oxford Cemetery, Franklin County, Idaho, 42°15′5″N 112°01′32″W, el. 4,849 feet (1,478 m)
- Preston Cemetery, Franklin County, Idaho, 42°07′5″N 111°51′30″W, el. 4,826 feet (1,471 m)
- Treasureton Cemetery, Franklin County, Idaho, 42°16′5″N 111°50′43″W, el. 5,089 feet (1,551 m)
- Whitney Cemetery, Franklin County, Idaho, 42°04′5″N 111°50′31″W, el. 4,688 feet (1,429 m)

== Fremont County ==
- Chester Cemetery, Fremont County, Idaho, 43°59′5″N 111°32′54″W, el. 5,111 feet (1,558 m)
- Farnum Cemetery, Fremont County, Idaho, 43°59′5″N 111°22′18″W, el. 5,617 feet (1,712 m)
- Riverview Cemetery, Fremont County, Idaho, 43°57′5″N 111°42′16″W, el. 4,924 feet (1,501 m)
- Squirrel Cemetery, Fremont County, Idaho, 44°03′5″N 111°17′53″W, el. 5,623 feet (1,714 m)
- Targhee Cemetery, Fremont County, Idaho, 44°38′5″N 111°20′33″W, el. 6,621 feet (2,018 m)

== Gem County ==
- Emmett Cemetery, Gem County, Idaho, 43°53′5″N 116°30′12″W, el. 2,434 feet (742 m)
- Sweet Cemetery, Gem County, Idaho, 43°57′5″N 116°20′04″W, el. 2,533 feet (772 m)

== Gooding County ==
- Elmwood Cemetery, Gooding County, Idaho, 42°55′5″N 114°42′07″W, el. 3,576 feet (1,090 m)
- Pioneer Cemetery, Gooding County, Idaho, 42°55′5″N 114°41′38″W, el. 3,586 feet (1,093 m)
- Pioneer Cemetery, Gooding County, Idaho, 42°55′5″N 114°56′43″W, el. 3,278 feet (999 m)

== Idaho County ==
- Battle Ridge Cemetery, Idaho County, Idaho, 46°03′5″N 115°55′06″W, el. 2,402 feet (732 m)
- Canfield Cemetery, Idaho County, Idaho, 45°50′5″N 116°22′11″W, el. 4,186 feet (1,276 m)
- Clearwater Cemetery, Idaho County, Idaho, 46°00′5″N 115°53′44″W, el. 2,769 feet (844 m)
- Cottonwood Cemetery, Idaho County, Idaho, 46°03′5″N 116°20′51″W, el. 3,609 feet (1,100 m)
- Denver Cemetery, Idaho County, Idaho, 46°00′5″N 116°13′25″W, el. 3,248 feet (990 m)
- Fairview Cemetery, Idaho County, Idaho, 45°58′5″N 116°04′02″W, el. 3,097 feet (944 m)
- Florence Cemetery, Idaho County, Idaho, 45°30′5″N 116°01′50″W, el. 6,056 feet (1,846 m)
- Grandview Cemetery, Idaho County, Idaho, 46°13′5″N 115°55′13″W, el. 3,346 feet (1,020 m)
- Joseph Cemetery, Idaho County, Idaho, 45°47′5″N 116°27′52″W, el. 4,354 feet (1,327 m)
- Meadow Creek Cemetery, Idaho County, Idaho, 46°08′5″N 116°18′45″W, el. 3,386 feet (1,032 m)
- Miller Cemetery, Idaho County, Idaho, 46°08′5″N 115°59′38″W, el. 1,247 feet (380 m)
- Mount Zion Cemetery, Idaho County, Idaho, 46°06′5″N 116°06′21″W, el. 3,058 feet (932 m)
- Nicodemus Cemetery, Idaho County, Idaho, 46°08′5″N 115°58′54″W, el. 1,240 feet (380 m)
- Nikesa Cemetery, Idaho County, Idaho, 46°12′5″N 116°00′22″W, el. 1,273 feet (388 m)
- North Riggins Cemetery, Idaho County, Idaho, 45°25′5″N 116°18′53″W, el. 2,005 feet (611 m)
- Pine Grove Cemetery, Idaho County, Idaho, 46°07′5″N 115°58′20″W, el. 1,283 feet (391 m)
- Saint Anthony Cemetery, Idaho County, Idaho, 46°06′5″N 116°15′16″W, el. 3,320 feet (1,010 m)
- Saint Maurus Cemetery, Idaho County, Idaho, 46°09′5″N 116°23′24″W, el. 3,760 feet (1,150 m)
- Stites Cemetery, Idaho County, Idaho, 46°05′5″N 115°59′07″W, el. 1,729 feet (527 m)
- Tahoe Cemetery, Idaho County, Idaho, 46°05′5″N 115°52′06″W, el. 2,674 feet (815 m)
- White Bird Cemetery, Idaho County, Idaho, 45°44′5″N 116°18′46″W, el. 1,850 feet (560 m)
- Winona Cemetery, Idaho County, Idaho, 46°07′5″N 116°07′23″W, el. 3,179 feet (969 m)

== Jefferson County ==
- Central Cemetery, Jefferson County, Idaho, 43°38′5″N 112°02′32″W, el. 4,777 feet (1,456 m)
- Lewisville Cemetery, Jefferson County, Idaho, 43°41′5″N 112°01′45″W, el. 4,793 feet (1,461 m)

== Kootenai County ==
- Bestland Cemetery, Kootenai County, Idaho, 47°42′5″N 116°46′26″W, el. 2,215 feet (675 m)
- Coeur d'Alene Indian Cemetery, Kootenai County, Idaho, 47°24′5″N 116°54′42″W, el. 2,677 feet (816 m)
- Evergreen Cemetery, Kootenai County, Idaho, 47°44′5″N 116°56′51″W, el. 2,238 feet (682 m)
- Forest Cemetery, Kootenai County, Idaho, 47°41′5″N 116°47′31″W, el. 2,188 feet (667 m)
- Greenwood Cemetery, Kootenai County, Idaho, 47°57′5″N 116°51′34″W, el. 2,575 feet (785 m)
- Lane Cemetery, Kootenai County, Idaho, 47°30′5″N 116°32′17″W, el. 2,172 feet (662 m)
- Medimont Cemetery, Kootenai County, Idaho, 47°28′5″N 116°36′20″W, el. 2,198 feet (670 m)
- Mountain View Cemetery, Kootenai County, Idaho, 47°56′5″N 116°43′17″W, el. 2,497 feet (761 m)
- Old Mission Cemetery, Kootenai County, Idaho, 47°31′5″N 116°21′27″W, el. 2,907 feet (886 m)
- Pine Grove Cemetery, Kootenai County, Idaho, 47°49′5″N 116°52′25″W, el. 2,228 feet (679 m)
- Restlawn Memorial Park, Kootenai County, Idaho, 47°44′5″N 116°47′16″W, el. 2,238 feet (682 m)
- Rimrock Cemetery, Kootenai County, Idaho, 47°49′5″N 116°45′52″W, el. 2,467 feet (752 m)
- Rose Lake Cemetery, Kootenai County, Idaho, 47°33′5″N 116°27′03″W, el. 2,283 feet (696 m)
- Ruther Cemetery (historical), Minidoka County, Idaho, location unknown
- Saint Michaels Cemetery, Kootenai County, Idaho, 47°24′5″N 116°54′44″W, el. 2,667 feet (813 m)
- Saint Thomas Cemetery, Kootenai County, Idaho, 47°40′5″N 116°45′17″W, el. 2,165 feet (660 m)
- Worley Cemetery, Kootenai County, Idaho, 47°25′5″N 116°55′04″W, el. 2,726 feet (831 m)

== Latah County ==
- American Ridge Cemetery, Latah County, Idaho, 46°36′5″N 116°43′09″W, el. 2,379 feet (725 m)
- Bethany Cemetery, Latah County, Idaho, 46°39′5″N 116°37′21″W, el. 2,631 feet (802 m)
- Bethel Cemetery, Latah County, Idaho, 46°40′5″N 116°45′02″W, el. 2,602 feet (793 m)
- Beulah Cemetery (Idaho), Latah County, Idaho, 46°45′5″N 116°47′31″W, el. 2,805 feet (855 m)
- Blaine Cemetery, Latah County, Idaho, 46°39′5″N 116°56′51″W, el. 2,858 feet (871 m)
- Bovill Cemetery, Latah County, Idaho, 46°51′5″N 116°24′24″W, el. 2,963 feet (903 m)
- Buchanan Cemetery, Latah County, Idaho, 46°41′5″N 116°52′46″W, el. 2,717 feet (828 m)
- Burnt Ridge Cemetery, Latah County, Idaho, 46°43′5″N 116°44′05″W, el. 2,821 feet (860 m)
- Cordelia Lutheran Cemetery, Latah County, Idaho, 46°39′5″N 116°53′50″W, el. 2,717 feet (828 m)
- Dry Creek Cemetery, Latah County, Idaho, 46°45′5″N 116°37′25″W, el. 2,831 feet (863 m)
- Elwood Cemetery, Latah County, Idaho, 46°43′5″N 116°32′23″W, el. 2,779 feet (847 m)
- Fix Ridge Cemetery, Latah County, Idaho, 46°34′5″N 116°45′37″W, el. 2,398 feet (731 m)
- Freeze Cemetery, Latah County, Idaho, 46°57′5″N 116°57′01″W, el. 2,621 feet (799 m)
- Genesee Valley Lutheran Cemetery, Latah County, Idaho, 46°36′5″N 116°55′32″W, el. 2,736 feet (834 m)
- Gold Hill Cemetery, Latah County, Idaho, 46°39′5″N 116°31′41″W, el. 2,792 feet (851 m)
- Juliaetta Cemetery, Latah County, Idaho, 46°35′5″N 116°42′09″W, el. 1,339 feet (408 m)
- Kendrick Cemetery, Latah County, Idaho, 46°36′5″N 116°39′21″W, el. 1,850 feet (560 m)
- Little Bear Ridge Cemetery, Latah County, Idaho, 46°41′5″N 116°40′56″W, el. 2,690 feet (820 m)
- Memorial Gardens Cemetery, Latah County, Idaho, 46°43′5″N 116°58′52″W, el. 2,608 feet (795 m)
- Mendenhall Cemetery, Latah County, Idaho, 46°55′5″N 116°52′32″W, el. 2,654 feet (809 m)
- Overacker Cemetery, Latah County, Idaho, 46°36′5″N 116°48′20″W, el. 2,352 feet (717 m)
- Pine Crest Cemetery, Latah County, Idaho, 46°48′5″N 116°33′33″W, el. 2,881 feet (878 m)
- Rock Creek Cemetery, Latah County, Idaho, 46°53′5″N 116°53′40″W, el. 2,904 feet (885 m)
- Saint Johns Lutheran Cemetery, Latah County, Idaho, 46°33′5″N 116°56′34″W, el. 2,746 feet (837 m)
- Spencer Cemetery, Latah County, Idaho, 46°44′5″N 116°44′30″W, el. 2,815 feet (858 m)
- Sunset Memorial Gardens Cemetery, Latah County, Idaho, 46°43′5″N 116°58′54″W, el. 2,602 feet (793 m)
- Wild Rose Cemetery, Latah County, Idaho, 46°41′5″N 116°36′51″W, el. 2,723 feet (830 m)
- Woodfell Cemetery, Latah County, Idaho, 46°58′5″N 116°40′21″W, el. 2,690 feet (820 m)
- Zion Cemetery, Latah County, Idaho, 46°47′5″N 116°35′24″W, el. 2,720 feet (830 m)

== Lemhi County ==
- Chief Tendoy Cemetery, Lemhi County, Idaho, 44°56′5″N 113°37′18″W, el. 5,131 feet (1,564 m)
- Junction Cemetery, Lemhi County, Idaho, 44°42′5″N 113°22′30″W, el. 6,050 feet (1,840 m)
- McRea Cemetery, Lemhi County, Idaho, 44°41′5″N 113°21′12″W, el. 6,047 feet (1,843 m)

== Lewis County ==
- Central Ridge Cemetery, Lewis County, Idaho, 46°22′5″N 116°19′34″W, el. 3,048 feet (929 m)
- Coldsprings Cemetery, Lewis County, Idaho, 46°16′5″N 116°33′26″W, el. 3,773 feet (1,150 m)
- Fletcher Cemetery, Lewis County, Idaho, 46°17′5″N 116°24′02″W, el. 3,501 feet (1,067 m)
- Forest Lawn Cemetery, Lewis County, Idaho, 46°17′5″N 116°39′04″W, el. 3,970 feet (1,210 m)
- Gold Ridge Cemetery, Lewis County, Idaho, 46°18′5″N 116°37′07″W, el. 3,802 feet (1,159 m)
- Holy Trinity Cemetery, Lewis County, Idaho, 46°14′5″N 116°15′13″W, el. 3,271 feet (997 m)
- Morrow Cemetery, Lewis County, Idaho, 46°07′5″N 116°30′54″W, el. 4,186 feet (1,276 m)
- Russell Cemetery, Lewis County, Idaho, 46°22′5″N 116°15′52″W, el. 3,022 feet (921 m)
- Teh LaPa Low Cemetery, Lewis County, Idaho, 46°14′5″N 116°02′02″W, el. 1,207 feet (368 m)

== Madison County ==
- Beaver Dick Cemetery, Madison County, Idaho, 43°50′5″N 111°53′20″W, el. 4,826 feet (1,471 m)
- Burton Cemetery, Madison County, Idaho, 43°47′5″N 111°49′48″W, el. 4,849 feet (1,478 m)
- Plano Cemetery, Madison County, Idaho, 43°53′5″N 111°54′04″W, el. 4,869 feet (1,484 m)
- Sugar City Cemetery, Madison County, Idaho, 43°50′5″N 111°44′14″W, el. 4,895 feet (1,492 m)
- Rexburg Cemetery, Madison County, Idaho, 43°50′5″N 111°47′39″W, el. 4,869 feet (1,484 m)
- Sutton Cemetery, Madison County, Idaho, 43°43′5″N 111°45′37″W, el. 4,921 feet (1,500 m)
- Teton Cemetery, Madison County, Idaho, 43°52′5″N 111°39′53″W, el. 4,970 feet (1,510 m)

== Minidoka County ==
- Paul Cemetery, Minidoka County, Idaho, 42°38′5″N 113°46′37″W, el. 4,157 feet (1,267 m)
- Rupert Cemetery, Minidoka County, Idaho, 42°41′5″N 113°39′53″W, el. 4,216 feet (1,285 m)

== Nez Perce County ==
- Angel Ridge Cemetery, Nez Perce County, Idaho, 46°28′5″N 116°28′07″W, el. 2,884 feet (879 m)
- Glasby Cemetery, Nez Perce County, Idaho, 46°28′5″N 116°40′19″W, el. 1,211 feet (369 m)
- Indian Cemetery, Nez Perce County, Idaho, 46°28′5″N 116°40′36″W, el. 1,201 feet (366 m)
- Kendrick Cemetery, Nez Perce County, Idaho, 46°36′5″N 116°39′21″W, el. 1,850 feet (560 m)
- Leland Cemetery, Nez Perce County, Idaho, 46°34′5″N 116°37′52″W, el. 2,326 feet (709 m)
- Lenora Cemetery, Nez Perce County, Idaho, 46°32′5″N 116°31′48″W, el. 2,579 feet (786 m)
- Melrose Cemetery, Nez Perce County, Idaho, 46°23′5″N 116°27′43″W, el. 3,241 feet (988 m)
- Old Good Hope Cemetery, Nez Perce County, Idaho, 46°24′5″N 116°29′58″W, el. 3,327 feet (1,014 m)
- Peck Cemetery, Nez Perce County, Idaho, 46°28′5″N 116°26′03″W, el. 1,732 feet (528 m)
- Red Elk Cemetery, Nez Perce County, Idaho, 46°19′5″N 116°47′16″W, el. 2,372 feet (723 m)
- Sunnyside Cemetery, Nez Perce County, Idaho, 46°30′5″N 116°28′58″W, el. 1,608 feet (490 m)
- Sweetwater Cemetery, Nez Perce County, Idaho, 46°22′5″N 116°48′03″W, el. 1,184 feet (361 m)
- Tammany Cemetery, Nez Perce County, Idaho, 46°18′5″N 116°53′11″W, el. 1,949 feet (594 m)

== Oneida County ==
- Holbrook Cemetery, Oneida County, Idaho, 42°09′5″N 112°39′59″W, el. 4,806 feet (1,465 m)
- Malad City Cemetery, Oneida County, Idaho, 42°10′5″N 112°13′56″W, el. 4,603 feet (1,403 m)

== Owyhee County ==
- Hot Springs Cemetery, Owyhee County, Idaho, 42°48′5″N 115°43′46″W, el. 2,608 feet (795 m)
- Jacob Reuben Graves, Owyhee County, Idaho, 43°10′5″N 116°23′41″W, el. 2,474 feet (754 m)
- Marsing-Homedale Cemetery, Owyhee County, Idaho, 43°32′5″N 116°53′32″W, el. 2,329 feet (710 m)
- Miller Creek Cemetery, Owyhee County, Idaho, 42°04′5″N 116°08′51″W, el. 5,315 feet (1,620 m)
- O X Cemetery, Owyhee County, Idaho, 42°50′5″N 115°46′39″W, el. 2,598 feet (792 m)
- Pioneer Cemetery, Owyhee County, Idaho, 43°01′5″N 116°43′54″W, el. 6,220 feet (1,900 m)
- Pleasant Valley Cemetery, Owyhee County, Idaho, 42°55′5″N 116°59′39″W, el. 4,567 feet (1,392 m)
- Stone Cemetery, Owyhee County, Idaho, 42°48′5″N 115°54′26″W, el. 2,657 feet (810 m)
- Wilson Cemetery, Owyhee County, Idaho, 43°21′5″N 116°39′20″W, el. 2,362 feet (720 m)

== Payette County ==
- Falk Cemetery, Payette County, Idaho, 43°55′5″N 116°44′08″W, el. 2,283 feet (696 m)
- Kennedy Cemetery, Payette County, Idaho, 43°58′5″N 116°47′31″W, el. 2,241 feet (683 m)
- Parkview Cemetery, Payette County, Idaho, 43°58′5″N 116°50′37″W, el. 2,257 feet (688 m)
- Riverside Cemetery, Payette County, Idaho, 44°05′5″N 116°56′10″W, el. 2,142 feet (653 m)
- Washoe Cemetery, Payette County, Idaho, 44°03′5″N 116°56′54″W, el. 2,172 feet (662 m)

== Power County ==
- Falls View Cemetery, Power County, Idaho, 42°46′5″N 112°52′22″W, el. 4,347 feet (1,325 m)
- Indian Cemetery, Power County, Idaho, 42°52′5″N 112°37′57″W, el. 4,445 feet (1,355 m)
- Neeley Cemetery, Power County, Idaho, 42°43′5″N 112°54′35″W, el. 4,386 feet (1,337 m)

== Shoshone County ==
- Greenwood Cemetery, Shoshone County, Idaho, 47°31′5″N 116°06′58″W, el. 2,589 feet (789 m)
- Heller Grave, Shoshone County, Idaho, 47°03′5″N 115°13′07″W, el. 4,728 feet (1,441 m)
- Miners Union Cemetery, Shoshone County, Idaho, 47°29′5″N 115°54′59″W, el. 2,995 feet (913 m)
- Murray Cemetery, Shoshone County, Idaho, 47°37′5″N 115°51′52″W, el. 2,805 feet (855 m)
- Shoshone Memorial Gardens, Shoshone County, Idaho, 47°32′5″N 116°17′28″W, el. 2,201 feet (671 m)
- United Cemetery, Shoshone County, Idaho, 47°29′5″N 115°54′55″W, el. 3,031 feet (924 m)

== Teton County ==
- Bates Cemetery, Teton County, Idaho, 43°42′5″N 111°13′17″W, el. 6,102 feet (1,860 m)
- Cache Clawson Cemetery, Teton County, Idaho, 43°48′5″N 111°08′34″W, el. 6,243 feet (1,903 m)
- Cedron Cemetery, Teton County, Idaho, 43°39′5″N 111°11′40″W, el. 6,106 feet (1,861 m)
- Cottonwood Cemetery, Valley County, Idaho, 44°40′5″N 116°26′46″W, el. 2,969 feet (905 m)
- Driggs Cemetery, Teton County, Idaho, 43°43′5″N 111°04′56″W, el. 6,191 feet (1,887 m)
- Driggs-Darby Cemetery, Teton County, Idaho, 43°41′5″N 111°04′35″W, el. 6,260 feet (1,910 m)
- Felt Cemetery, Teton County, Idaho, 43°51′5″N 111°12′18″W, el. 6,033 feet (1,839 m)
- Haden Cemetery, Teton County, Idaho, 43°49′5″N 111°12′19″W, el. 5,987 feet (1,825 m)
- Victor Cemetery, Teton County, Idaho, 43°35′5″N 111°05′28″W, el. 6,302 feet (1,921 m)

== Twin Falls County ==
- Buhl Cemetery, Twin Falls County, Idaho, 42°36′5″N 114°44′12″W, el. 3,779 feet (1,152 m)
- Independent Order of Odd Fellows Cemetery, Twin Falls County, Idaho, 42°34′5″N 114°35′08″W, el. 3,717 feet (1,133 m)
- Rock Creek Cemeteries, Twin Falls County, Idaho, 42°27′5″N 114°18′17″W, el. 4,108 feet (1,252 m)
- Sunset Memorial Park Cemetery, Twin Falls County, Idaho, 42°32′5″N 114°26′02″W, el. 3,793 feet (1,156 m)
- Twin Falls Cemetery, Twin Falls County, Idaho, 42°33′5″N 114°26′13″W, el. 3,783 feet (1,153 m)

== Valley County ==
- Alpha Cemetery, Valley County, Idaho, 44°25′5″N 115°58′35″W, el. 4,892 feet (1,491 m)
- Finn Cemetery, Valley County, Idaho, 44°49′5″N 116°02′49″W, el. 5,003 feet (1,525 m)
- Homes Cemetery, Valley County, Idaho, 44°41′5″N 116°00′50″W, el. 4,882 feet (1,488 m)
- Klines Grave, Valley County, Idaho, 44°39′5″N 115°41′13″W, el. 5,167 feet (1,575 m)
- Pioneer Cemetery, Valley County, Idaho, 44°57′5″N 115°29′56″W, el. 4,695 feet (1,431 m)
- Spink Cemetery, Valley County, Idaho, 44°47′5″N 116°02′40″W, el. 4,928 feet (1,502 m)

== Washington County ==
- Galloway Cemetery, Washington County, Idaho, 44°14′5″N 116°53′17″W, el. 2,195 feet (669 m)
- Mann Creek Cemetery, Washington County, Idaho, 44°22′5″N 116°52′12″W, el. 2,694 feet (821 m)
- Midvale Cemetery, Washington County, Idaho, 44°28′5″N 116°41′08″W, el. 2,648 feet (807 m)
