= List of Superfund sites in Idaho =

This is a list of Superfund sites in Idaho, United States of America, as designated by the United States Environmental Protection Agency under the Comprehensive Environmental Response, Compensation, and Liability Act (CERCLA). CERCLA, passed by Congress in 1980, authorized EPA to create a list of polluted locations requiring a long-term response to clean up hazardous-material contamination. These locations are designated as Superfund sites, and are placed on EPA's National Priorities List (NPL).

The NPL guides the EPA in "determining which sites warrant further investigation" for environmental remediation. The industrial sites were areas of mining, heavy metal processing and manufacturing, during a period when processes were inefficient and wastes were dumped, contaminating water and land, with polluting materials also released into the air. In many cases the companies responsible for contamination are no longer in business, and the federal government has had to contribute to clean-up to protect citizens' health.

As of April 2010, there were six Superfund sites in Idaho on the National Priorities List. Three more sites have been proposed as qualifying for entry on the list, and three have been cleaned up and removed from the list.

== Superfund sites ==
Proposed for addition to National Priorities List
Deleted from National Priorities List

CERCLIS ID	Name	County	Reason	Proposed	Listed	Construction completed	Partially deleted	Deleted
IDD000800961	Arrcom (Drexler Enterprises)	Kootenai	Site soil contamination by VOCs, heavy metals including lead and mercury, acid, PCBs and PCP from waste oil recycling. Asbestos contamination in site buildings.	12/30/1982	09/08/1983	06/30/1992	–	12/23/1992
IDD980725832	Blackbird Mine	Lemhi	Groundwater, surface water, soil and sediment contamination by copper, cobalt and arsenic. Acid rock drainage from mine tunnels and waste has decreased water quality in local creeks, affecting chinook salmon and other threatened and endangered species.	05/10/1993	–	–	–	–
IDD048340921	Bunker Hill Mining & Metallurgical	Shoshone	The Coeur d'Alene River basin contains millions of tons of mine tailings, waste rock and ore concentrates. Soil, sediments, groundwater and surface water are contaminated with heavy metals including cadmium, lead and zinc from former mining and smelting operations.	12/30/1982	09/08/1983	–	–	–
IDD984666610	Eastern Michaud Flats Contamination	Power and Bannock	Groundwater and surface water contamination by arsenic and phosphorus from phosphorus ore processing plants. Off-site soil contamination from airborne release of fluoride, radium-226 and cadmium; on-site soil contamination by cadmium, chromium, copper, lead, nickel, silver, vanadium, zinc, radium-226 and fluoride.	05/05/1989	08/30/1990	–	–	–
ID4890008952	Idaho National Laboratory (DOE)	Butte, Clark, Jefferson, and Bingham	Groundwater contamination by hexavalent chromium, iodine-129, strontium-90, technetium-99, tritium, carbon tetrachloride and TCE; soil contamination by heavy metals including lead and mercury, by VOCs, and by radionuclides, including cesium-137, strontium-90, and plutonium.	07/14/1989	11/21/1989	–	–	–
IDD041310707	Kerr-McGee Chemical Corp. (Soda Springs)	Caribou	Surface water, ground water and solid waste contamination by vanadium, arsenic, molybdenum, manganese, tributyl phosphate and total petroleum hydrocarbons.	05/05/1989	10/04/1989	09/26/2001	–	–
IDD081830994	Monsanto Chemical Co. (Soda Springs)	Caribou	Groundwater contamination by cadmium, selenium, nitrate, and fluoride from phosphorus ore processing plant. Soil on-site and on nearby buffer properties contaminated by radium-226 blown from ore stockpiles.	05/05/1989	08/30/1990	09/20/2000	–	–
ID3572124557	Mountain Home Air Force Base	Elmore	Groundwater contamination by TCE, aviation fuel and benzene from aircraft maintenance and industrial operations.	07/14/1989	08/30/1990	09/30/1998	–	–
IDD098812878	Pacific Hide & Fur Recycling Co.	Bannock	Soil contamination by PCBs, lead and other inorganic compounds from scrap metal disposal.	09/08/1983	09/21/1984	09/29/1997	–	11/04/1999
IDSFN1002095	St. Maries Creosote	Benewah	Creosote contamination of debris, soil and surface water from pole treatment plant.	12/01/2000	–	–	–	–
IDD980665459	Stibnite/Yellow Pine Mining Area	Valley	Heavy metal, arsenic and cyanide contamination of groundwater, seeps, sediments and soils from gold-antimony ore mining and milling.	09/13/2001	–	–	–	–
IDD055030852	Union Pacific Railroad Co.	Bannock	Groundwater contamination by heavy metals, PAHs and organic compounds from Union Pacific's waste water treatment facility and an adjacent tie treatment plant.	09/08/1983	09/21/1984	09/19/1996	–	09/22/1997

In addition, a proposal to add the Triumph Mine Tailings Site to the NPL was made in 1993 but withdrawn in 2003 as the EPA felt that all major sources of risk had been mitigated.

== See also ==
- List of Superfund sites in the United States
- List of environmental issues
- List of waste types
- TOXMAP
