= Index of Idaho-related articles =

The location of the state of Idaho in the United States of America

The following is an alphabetical list of articles related to the U.S. state of Idaho.

== 0–9 ==
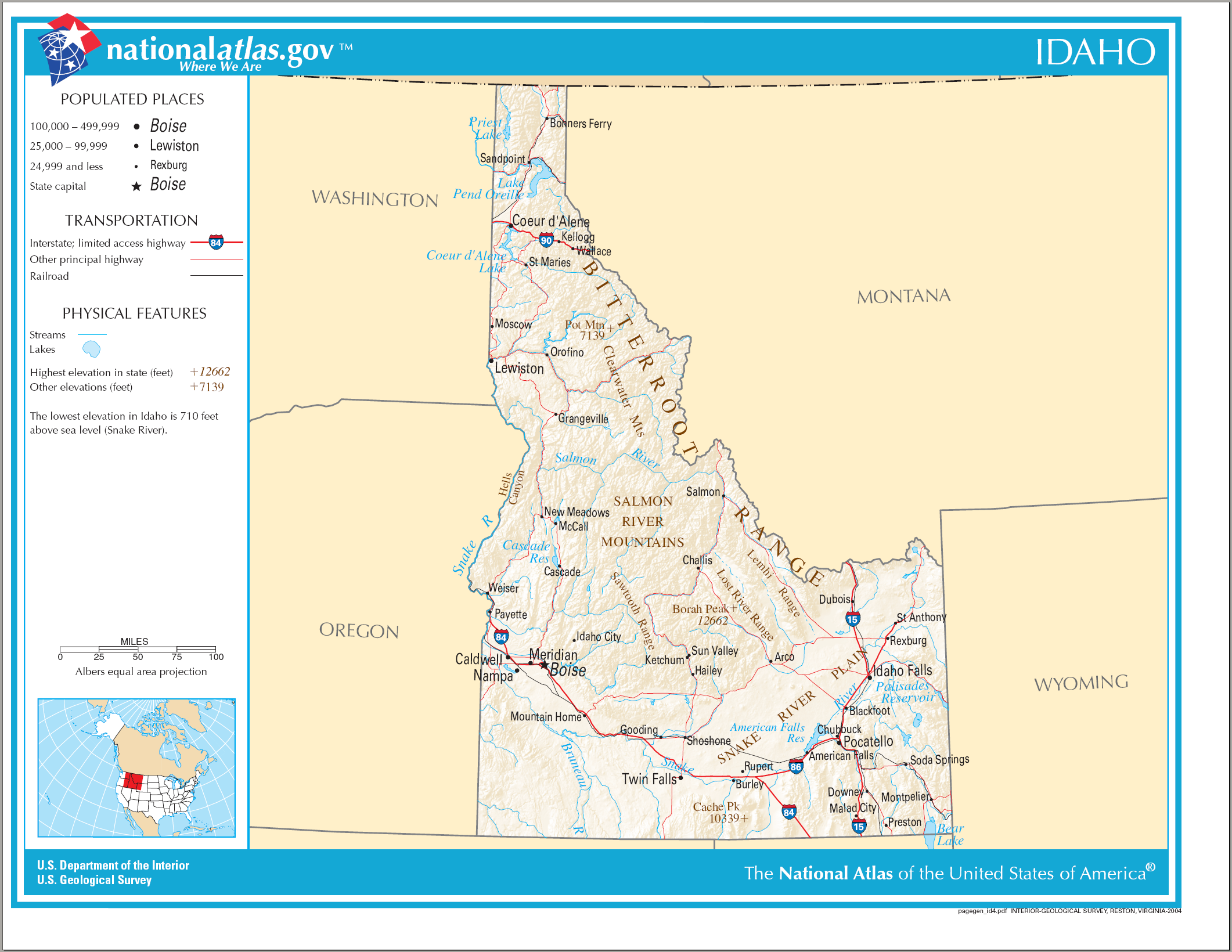
An enlargeable map of the state of Idaho

- .id.us – Internet second-level domain for the state of Idaho
- 43rd state to join the United States of America
- North American ice storm of January 1961

== A ==
- Adams-Onís Treaty of 1819
- Adjacent states and province:
  - Province of British Columbia
  - State of Montana
  - State of Nevada
  - State of Oregon
  - State of Utah
  - State of Washington
  - State of Wyoming
- Agriculture in Idaho
  - Category:Agriculture in Idaho
    - commons:Category:Agriculture in Idaho
- Airports in Idaho, List of
- American Redoubt
- Amphibians and reptiles of Idaho
- Amusement parks in Idaho
- Arboreta in Idaho
  - commons:Category:Arboreta in Idaho
- Archaeology of Idaho
  - Category:Archaeological sites in Idaho
    - commons:Category:Archaeological sites in Idaho
- Architecture in Idaho
  - commons:Category:Buildings in Idaho
- Area codes in Idaho, List of
- Astronomical observatories in Idaho
  - commons:Category:Astronomical observatories in Idaho

== B ==
- Boise, Idaho, territorial and state capital since 1865
- Botanical gardens in Idaho
  - commons:Category:Botanical gardens in Idaho
- Buildings and structures in Idaho
  - commons:Category:Buildings and structures in Idaho

== C ==
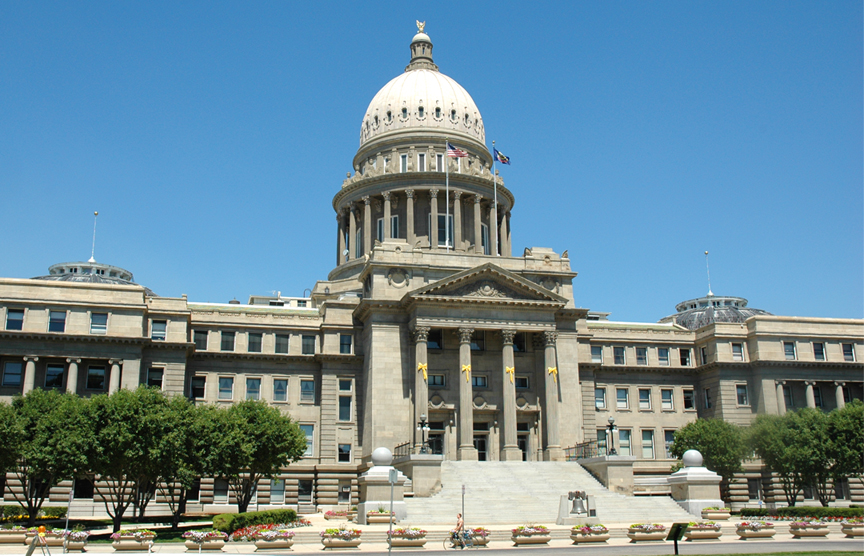
The Idaho State Capitol in Boise

- Canyons and gorges of Idaho
  - commons:Category:Canyons and gorges of Idaho
- Capitol of the State of Idaho, Boise, Idaho
  - commons:Category:Idaho State Capitol
- Caves of Idaho
  - commons:Category:Caves of Idaho
- Census statistical areas of Idaho

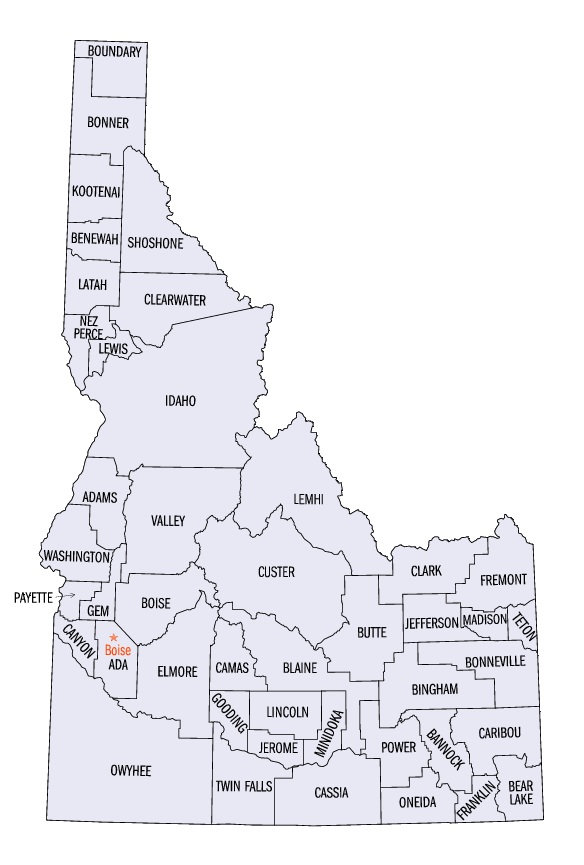
An enlargeable map of the 44 counties of the state of Idaho

- Cities in Idaho, List of
  - commons:Category:Cities in Idaho
- Climate of Idaho
- Climate change in Idaho
- Colleges and universities in Idaho, List of
  - commons:Category:Universities and colleges in Idaho
- Communications in Idaho
  - commons:Category:Communications in Idaho
- Companies in Idaho
- Congressional districts of Idaho
- Constitution of the State of Idaho
- Convention centers in Idaho
  - commons:Category:Convention centers in Idaho
- Counties of the state of Idaho, List of
  - commons:Category:Counties in Idaho
- Culture of Idaho
  - commons:Category:Idaho culture

== D ==
- Demographics of Idaho

== E ==
- Economy of Idaho
  - Category:Economy of Idaho
    - commons:Category:Economy of Idaho
- Education in Idaho
  - Category:Education in Idaho
    - commons:Category:Education in Idaho
- Elections in Idaho
  - commons:Category:Elections in Idaho
- Environment of Idaho
  - commons:Category:Environment of Idaho

== F ==
The flag of the state of Idaho

- Festivals in Idaho
  - commons:Category:Festivals in Idaho
- Flag of the state of Idaho
- Forts in Idaho
  - Category:Forts in Idaho
    - commons:Category:Forts in Idaho

== G ==
The Great Seal of the State of Idaho

- Geography of Idaho
  - Category:Geography of Idaho
    - commons:Category:Geography of Idaho
- Geology of Idaho
  - Category:Geology of Idaho
    - commons:Category:Geology of Idaho
- Geysers of Idaho
  - commons:Category:Geysers of Idaho
- Ghost towns in Idaho, List of
  - Category:Ghost towns in Idaho
    - commons:Category:Ghost towns in Idaho
- Golf clubs and courses in Idaho
- Government of the State of Idaho website
  - Category:Government of Idaho
    - commons:Category:Government of Idaho
- Governor of the State of Idaho
  - List of governors of Idaho
- Great Seal of the State of Idaho

== H ==
- Health care in Idaho
- High schools of Idaho, List of
- Higher education in Idaho, List of
- Highway routes in Idaho, List of
  - Interstate Highway routes in Idaho, List of
  - U.S. Highway routes in Idaho, List of
- Hiking trails in Idaho
  - commons:Category:Hiking trails in Idaho
- History of Idaho
  - Historical outline of Idaho
    - Category:History of Idaho
      - commons:Category:History of Idaho
- Hospitals in Idaho, List of
- Hot springs of Idaho
  - commons:Category:Hot springs of Idaho
- House of Representatives of the State of Idaho

== I ==
- ID, List of – United States Postal Service postal code for the state of Idaho
- Idaho website
  - Category:Idaho
    - commons:Category:Idaho
      - commons:Category:Maps of Idaho
- Idaho State Capitol
- Images of Idaho
  - commons:Category:Idaho

== L ==
- Lakes of Idaho
  - commons:Category:Lakes of Idaho
- Landmarks in Idaho
  - commons:Category:Landmarks in Idaho
- Legislation, Idaho
- Lewis and Clark Expedition, 1804-1806
- Lewiston, Idaho, first territorial capital 1863-1865
- Lieutenant Governor of the State of Idaho
- Lists related to the state of Idaho:
  - List of airports in Idaho
  - List of census statistical areas in Idaho
  - List of cities in Idaho
  - List of colleges and universities in Idaho
  - List of companies based in Idaho
  - List of United States congressional districts in Idaho
  - List of counties in Idaho
  - List of dams and reservoirs in Idaho
  - List of forts in Idaho
  - List of ghost towns in Idaho
  - List of governors of Idaho
  - List of high schools in Idaho
  - List of highway routes in Idaho
  - List of hospitals in Idaho
  - List of individuals executed in Idaho
  - List of lakes in Idaho
  - List of law enforcement agencies in Idaho
  - List of museums in Idaho
  - List of National Historic Landmarks in Idaho
  - List of newspapers in Idaho
  - List of people from Idaho
  - List of places in Idaho
  - List of power stations in Idaho
  - List of radio stations in Idaho
  - List of railroads in Idaho
  - List of Registered Historic Places in Idaho
  - List of rivers of Idaho
  - List of school districts in Idaho
  - List of state forests in Idaho
  - List of state parks in Idaho
  - List of state prisons in Idaho
  - List of symbols of the State of Idaho
  - List of telephone area codes in Idaho
  - List of television stations in Idaho
  - List of Idaho's congressional delegations
  - List of United States congressional districts in Idaho
  - List of United States representatives from Idaho
  - List of United States senators from Idaho

== M ==
- Maps of Idaho
  - commons:Category:Maps of Idaho
- Mass media in Idaho
- Mountains of Idaho
  - commons:Category:Mountains of Idaho
- Museums in Idaho, List of
  - Category:Museums in Idaho
    - commons:Category:Museums in Idaho
- Music of Idaho
  - commons:Category:Music of Idaho
  - Category:Musical groups from Idaho
  - Category:Musicians from Idaho

== N ==
- National forests of Idaho
  - commons:Category:National Forests of Idaho
- Natural history of Idaho
  - commons:Category:Natural history of Idaho
- Newspapers of Idaho, List of

== O ==
- Oregon Country, 1818–1846
- Oregon Treaty of 1846

== P ==
- People from Idaho, List of
  - Category:People from Idaho
    - commons:Category:People from Idaho
    - Category:People from Idaho by populated place
    - Category:People from Idaho by county
    - Category:People from Idaho by occupation
- Places in Idaho, List of
- Politics of Idaho
  - commons:Category:Politics of Idaho
- Protected areas of Idaho
  - commons:Category:Protected areas of Idaho

== R ==
- Radio stations in Idaho, List of
- Railroads in Idaho, List of
- Registered historic places in Idaho, List of
  - commons:Category:Registered Historic Places in Idaho
- Religion in Idaho - Idaho Main
  - Category:Religion in Idaho
    - commons:Category:Religion in Idaho
- Rivers of Idaho
  - commons:Category:Rivers of Idaho
- Rock formations in Idaho
  - commons:Category:Rock formations in Idaho
- Roller coasters in Idaho
  - commons:Category:Roller coasters in Idaho
- Ruby Ridge

== S ==
- School districts of Idaho, List of
- Scouting in Idaho
- Senate of the State of Idaho
- Settlements in Idaho
  - Cities in Idaho
  - Census Designated Places in Idaho
  - Other unincorporated communities in Idaho
  - List of ghost towns in Idaho
  - List of places in Idaho, List of
- Ski areas and resorts in Idaho
  - commons:Category:Ski areas and resorts in Idaho
- Snake River
- Solar power in Idaho
- Sports in Idaho - Idaho Main
  - Category:Sports in Idaho
    - commons:Category:Sports in Idaho
  - Category:Sports venues in Idaho
    - commons:Category:Sports venues in Idaho
- State Capitol of Idaho
- State of Idaho website
  - Constitution of the State of Idaho
  - Government of the state of Idaho
    - Category:Government of Idaho
      - commons:Category:Government of Idaho
  - Executive branch of the government of the state of Idaho
    - Governor of the State of Idaho
  - Legislative branch of the government of the state of Idaho
    - Legislature of the State of Idaho
      - Senate of the State of Idaho
      - House of Representatives of the State of Idaho
  - Judicial branch of the government of the state of Idaho
    - Supreme Court of the State of Idaho
- State parks of Idaho, List of
  - commons:Category:State parks of Idaho
- State prisons of Idaho, List of
- Structures in Idaho
  - commons:Category: Buildings and structures in Idaho
- Sun Valley, Idaho
- Supreme Court of the State of Idaho
- Symbols of the state of Idaho, List of
  - Category:Symbols of Idaho
    - commons:Category:Symbols of Idaho

== T ==
- Telecommunications in Idaho
  - commons:Category:Communications in Idaho
- Telephone area codes in Idaho, List of
- Television stations in Idaho, List of
- Territory of Idaho, 1863–1890
- Territory of Oregon, 1848–1859
- Territory of Washington, (1853–1863)-1889
- Tourism in Idaho website
  - commons:Category:Tourism in Idaho
- Transportation in Idaho
  - Category:Transportation in Idaho
    - commons:Category:Transport in Idaho

== U ==
- United States of America
  - States of the United States of America
  - United States census statistical areas of Idaho
  - Idaho's congressional delegations
  - United States congressional districts in Idaho
  - United States Court of Appeals for the Ninth Circuit
  - United States District Court for the District of Idaho
  - United States representatives from Idaho, List of
  - United States senators from Idaho, List of
- Universities and colleges in Idaho, List of
  - commons:Category:Universities and colleges in Idaho
- US-ID – ISO 3166-2:US region code for the State of Idaho

== W ==
- Water parks in Idaho
- Waterfalls of Idaho
  - commons:Category:Waterfalls of Idaho
  Wikimedia
  - Wikimedia Commons:Category:Idaho
    - commons:Category:Maps of Idaho
  - Wikinews:Category:Idaho
    - Wikinews:Portal:Idaho
  - Wikipedia Category:Idaho
    - Wikipedia:WikiProject Idaho
      - Category:WikiProject Idaho articles
      - Category:WikiProject Idaho participants
- Wind power in Idaho

== Z ==
- Zoos
  - Pocatello Zoo
  - Tautphaus Park Zoo
  - Zoo Boise

== See also ==
- Topic overview:
  - Idaho
  - Outline of Idaho
