= Prison overcrowding in the United States =

When the number of prisoners in a society exceeds the capacity of prisons

Prison overcrowding in the United States is a condition that occurs when the number of inmates in a correctional facility exceeds its designed capacity. Over the last 40 years, the number of persons held in prisons and jails in the United States per capita has more than quadrupled, with the total proportion of incarcerated people now surpassing 2.3 million. This issue, although existing for many years, gained its prominence during the United States' war on drugs, which placed significant responsibility on the individual stated for mitigating the prison overcrowding issues with limited financial resources. This was further complicated by the passage of draconian sentencing and parole schemes in the mid-1970s by the state and federal legislators that were designed to keep the increasing proportion of people in prison for decades. Moreover, federal prison populations may increase if states adhere to federal policies, such as mandatory minimum sentences. On the other hand, the Justice Department provides billions of dollars a year for state and local law enforcement to ensure they follow the policies set forth by the federal government concerning U.S. prisons. Prison overcrowding has affected some states more than others, but overall, the risks of overcrowding are substantial and there are solutions to this problem.

== Prison history ==
The Great Depression witnessed the mushrooming of crime rates as individuals resorted to crimes for survival. Although incarceration rates steadily rose from 1929 to 1970, they drastically increased with the introduction of Nixon's war on drugs which mandated stricter sentencing. Nixon's war on drugs was a steady growth in the crime rates and reports concerning the prevalence of drug abuse and drug-related crimes, with lawmakers around the country enacting stringent mandatory minimum sentencing laws directed at severely punishing the manufacturing, usage, and sale of drugs, among other crimes. The issue of prison overcrowding was further compounded with the enactment of the Three Strikes Law. The enactment of these laws was rationalized to the public through presenting it as an effective way of deterring irredeemable criminals from committing future crimes by putting them in very long sentences.

== Comparative statistics ==
It was estimated in 2018 that there were a total of 2.3 million inmates incarcerated. Around 1.3 million of those inmates were incarcerated within the State Prison systems. The U.S. incarceration rate is twice that of China, and is at 103.9% of capacity. In comparison, Haiti is the most overcrowded at 454.4%.

== States ==
=== Colorado ===
Colorado is one of the many states dealing with the prison overcrowding issue. According to the Colorado Division of Criminal Justice (2019), "The Colorado prison population is expected to increase by 20.5% between fiscal years 2018 and 2025, from an actual year-end inmate population of 20,136 to a projected population of 24,261." The greatest agreed upon factor to prison overcrowding is parolees who re-offend by violating their parole supervision. Colorado saw an increase of 8% from the fiscal year 2017 to the fiscal year 2018 for parolees who returned to prison for technical parole violations.

== Causes ==
Although offenders are being released, many may have not responded to enacted rehabilitation tactics to prevent continued illegal activity. This often leads reoccurring offenders back into the prison system. There has been an increase in waitlisted or lack of specialized programs such as drug rehabilitation, or education. Some convicts are not eligible for parole, which further extends incarceration times.

Another cause of prison overcrowding is the lack of effective rehabilitation programs for offenders upon release. Proper rehabilitation programs act as deterrents for many released inmates from committing further crimes, leading to a high rate of recidivism. The increase in waitlists and the lack of specialized programs, including drug, alcohol, and intoxicated driving courses detrimentally impact the ability of inmates to receive adequate rehabilitation. Furthermore, the nature of certain crimes does not allow the possibility for parole, resulting in extended or life sentences that ultimately lead to long-term overcrowding.

== Risks ==
The rise of overcrowding has resulted in many issues such as:

- Poor health care
- Increased gang activity
- Increased mental health issues
- Violence/Racism
- Spread of diseases
- Staff stress

Prison overcrowding could create a range of consequences that have become prevalent in the world today. First, prison overcrowding could affect resources per prisoner. The more inmates that are admitted, the fewer resources there are to distribute. Due to the lack of resources, inmates may be forced to spend large amounts of time doing nothing rather than becoming engaged in an activity. The amount of resources continues to reduce as more prisoners are admitted, and social support services become more limited. With a small amount of space and resources within the prisons, prisoners progress more slowly through the steps to release, and their numbers accumulate more quickly. The combination of those two factors could lead to the prison system slowing down, and prisoners' progress would also begin to move slowly. If the prisoners' progress is slowed, then their exit is slowed as well. This will heavily increase overcrowding and results in a facility reaching maximum capacity at a faster rate.

Prison overcrowding comes with an opportunity cost. The amount of money spent on mass incarceration annually could be allocated to other areas of need, such as public safety or the reduction of crime. Every year, $182 billion is spent on mass incarceration. Within that total, approximately $81 billion is spent on public corrections agencies and about $63 billion on policing. Much of this money is given to the staff to supervise large numbers of inmates for long periods of time. For example, in the state of Alabama, it's possible to witness a correctional officer supervising up to 250–300 high-risk offenders for an extended period of time. These circumstances can result in the increase of prisoner violence. In 2011, there was an approximately 40% increase from the prior year in inmate violence that lead to some serious injuries.

In addition to Alabama, Delaware, and California are also great examples of shown consequences due to prison overcrowding. In February 2017, a group of inmates from the James T. Vaughn correctional center in Delaware were involved in the hostage of four correctional officers. This resulted in the murder of Lt. Steven Floyd and the injury of many others. Vaughn is Delaware's largest prison, and has been under much scrutiny for years; however, nothing has been done about the overcrowding problems within the state's corrections department. After the death of Floyd, more than 100 officers retired early or quit because of the increased dangers of working at Vaughn, thus leading to low staffing levels. Furthermore, by the end of 2010, California's prison facilities contained on average 175 percent over the required capacity, leading to the triple-bunking of prisoners. During the 2011 U.S. Supreme Court decision Brown v. Plata, the California prison system held about 156,000 inmates, which was twice as many as the requirement of approximately 85,000 maximum capacity. In a ruling of Brown v. Plata, the Supreme Court concluded that California's correctional facilities violated prisoners' Eighth Amendment rights. Overcrowding in those prisons caused inmates to receive poor medical and mental health care, not including the inhumane conditions due to lack of resources and space.

== Solutions ==
One way to manage populations within the prison system would be to prevent new crimes from being committed. Some alternatives include:

- Alternative programs that provide mental health services, drug diversion programs, or house arrest (especially for minor crimes)
- Building more prisons
- Increasing the chances of parole
- Releasing those that have committed crimes that are now legal

Findings resulting from the research conducted suggest that technological systems are a viable solution for prison overcrowding:

- This proposed solution would be applied to individuals who commit non-violent crimes.
- Technological systems are estimated to be less expensive than housing inmates in prison facilities. The Federal Register of the United States reports the average cost for incarceration of federal inmates was $36,299.25 for fiscal year 2017. This breaks down to $99.45 per day.
- Bagaric, Hunter, and Wolf (2018) estimate, “An ongoing cost of technological incarceration of between $10,000 and $15,000 per annum per prisoner, including amortization of the initial development costs” (p. 121).
- Technological systems would aid parole officers in monitoring the parolees’ locations and actions. Bagaric, Hunter, and Wolf (2018) explain that, “If they attempt to escape, commit harmful acts, or disable or remove their body sensors, the computers monitoring the events will instantly activate the CEDs embedded in their ankle bracelets to administer the electric shock” (p. 109). Law enforcement would immediately be notified so the situation can be assessed.

Despite its risks and consequences, prison overcrowding can be solved in many different ways. First, the use of diversion programs can aid in prisoners avoiding prison entry. Diversion programs are programs that divert, or turn prisoners away from prison time. This could also free up much space within the prisons and prevent faster maximum capacity. More programs that take on rehabilitative and restorative approaches are also needed to divert offenders from prison admission. Restorative justice is when the interaction between the offender and the victim aids in the healing of the victim and the community. This, along with other therapeutic approaches would be more effective than retribution. Other diversion programs consist of intermediate sanctions, such as fines, probation, restitution, and corrections.

Another alternative to prison overcrowding is the use of early release incentives. These are ways to encourage the reduction of prison populations, while motivating the prisoners who are eligible for early release programs. Some early release incentives may include: parole, house arrest, or good behavior, which are also referred to as "backdoor strategies" in that it strives to release prisoners earlier than their sentence expiration. In addition, the construction strategy is a good alternative to prison overcrowding. This comprises building more prisons for more prison admissions. Furthermore, more space would equal better conditions for inmates because there would be more resources left to distribute within the inmates. These alternatives would save tax dollar money and lessen conflicts within the criminal justice system.

One solution the state of Alabama used to alleviate its prison overcrowding issues was the use of leased beds in 2008. Inmates were housed inside of leased facilities that had a strict capacity requirement under federal court order, which helped to reduce overcrowding within the main correctional facilities. In addition, Alabama expanded alternative sentencing options that consisted of community and rehabilitative programs primarily for nonviolent offenders who have drug/substance abuse addictions. On the other hand, California initiated the transfer of approximately 33,000 nonviolent offenders from state to county jails in 2011, leading to an increase in early releases. The California Department of Corrections and Rehabilitation has also made the efforts of reallocating parolees and inmates safely to other areas to maintain the mandatory population levels within the facilities.

== See also ==
- Attica Prison riot
- List of Alabama state prisons
- List of Alaska state prisons
- List of Arizona state prisons
- List of California state prisons
- List of Connecticut state prisons
- List of countries by incarceration rate
- List of Florida state prisons
- List of Hawaii state prisons
- List of Idaho state prisons
- List of Michigan state prisons
- List of Nebraska state prisons
- List of Nevada state prisons
- List of New York state prisons
- List of Oklahoma state prisons
- List of Pennsylvania state prisons
- List of Texas state prisons
- List of Virginia state prisons
- List of Washington state prisons
- Lists of United States state prisons
- Mandatory sentencing
- Prisons in California
- Prison overcrowding
- Prison riot
- Private prison
- Supermax prison
