= List of Idaho state symbols =

Location of the state of Idaho in the United States of America

The state of Idaho has 16 official emblems, as designated by the state legislature. These symbols, which reflect the history and culture of the state, are often opportunities for politicians to "tie themselves to popular symbols", for teachers to highlight the legislative process to their students, and for lobbyists to "have their products given official designation".

Idaho's first official symbol was its seal, adopted in 1863 when the Idaho Territory became an organized incorporated territory of the United States. The state's second symbol was its motto, which was chosen shortly after Idaho was admitted to the Union in 1890. Five additional symbols were added between 1900 and 1950, including three in 1931 alone. Six symbols were designated between 1950 and 2000, and three additional symbols have been added since 2000. Three symbols have been adopted that were proposed by students; the Appaloosa became the state horse in 1992 following a proposal from sixth-graders from Eagle, Idaho, and in 1992 elementary school students in Boise introduced the monarch butterfly as the state insect. In 2023 Idaho's most recent symbol, Oryctodromeus cubicularis, was adopted as the state dinosaur following a proposal from students at Ucon Elementary.

While some of the symbols are unique to Idaho, others are used by multiple states. For example, the mountain bluebird, Idaho's state bird, is also an official symbol for Nevada. Idaho's state fish, cutthroat trout, is also an official symbol for Wyoming, while specific subspecies of cutthroat are the state fish of Colorado, Montana, Nevada, New Mexico, and Utah. The square dance and monarch are commonly used state dances and state insects (or in some cases state butterflies), respectively.

== State symbols ==
Type	Symbol	Description	Adopted	Image
Amphibian	Idaho giant salamander	The Idaho giant salamander (Dicamptodon aterrimus) is the largest salamander found in the state of Idaho, where it lives almost exclusively. Over their lifetime, these salamanders will metamorphose from a larva to a terrestrial adult, or will mature into an adult but retain the larval form, such as keeping gills, growing to lengths of 33 cm (~13 in). Idaho giant salamanders are generally found in moist coniferous forests and can change colors. The transformed adults are secretive and seldom found in the open, but can be found in moist areas.	2015	
Bird	Mountain bluebird (Sialia currucoides)	Adopted as the state bird by the Idaho Legislature in 1931, the mountain bluebird is one of two bluebird species found in the state. Known for their bright blue plumage, these migratory birds often arrive in Idaho in late February or early March, nest, then migrate south in September or early October.	1931	A blue bird with a light underside and black eyes, perched on a pine branch.
Dance	Square dance		1989	A group of dancers in colorful Western clothing promenading in a circle, with a man speaking into a microphone on a stage in the background.
Dinosaur	Oryctodromeus cubicularis	Oryctodromeus, a burrowing dinosaur that lived 98 million years ago, has been found in the Wayan Formation in Southeast Idaho, as well as Montana. It was proposed by students at Ucon Elementary and officially adopted on July 6, 2023	2023	Oryctodromeus cubicularis in its burrow.
Fish	Cutthroat trout (Oncorhynchus clarkii)	Native to Idaho, the cutthroat trout's name comes from the "distinctive red to orange slash" on the underside of its jaw. During an attempt to designate a state fish in 1988, critics of the cutthroat pointed out that the species was not found throughout the entire state. When the Legislature adopted the species in 1990, bill sponsor Mary Lou Reed called the cutthroat a "good symbol" of the state's "quality of life".	1990	A fish with yellow and pink coloring, along with black spotting on the back part of its body, being held in a person's hands over water.
Flag	Flag of Idaho		1957	A blue flag with a circular seal in the center. The words "State of Idaho" appear in gold letters on a red and gold band below the seal.
Flower	Syringa (Philadelphus lewisii)	Documented and collected by Meriwether Lewis in 1806, the syringa was designated the Idaho State Flower in 1931.	1931	A cluster of flowers with four white petals each, along with yellow stamens in the center of each.
Fossil	Hagerman horse (Equus simplicidens)	The Hagerman horse (Equus simplicidens originally described as Plesippus shoshonensis) was declared the official state fossil of Idaho by the 1988 Legislature. A 3.5 million year old fossil bed near Hagerman, discovered in the 1920s, has yielded more than 30 complete horse skeletons and is said to be the "best known Pleistocene-epoch fossil site in the world". Hagerman Fossil Beds National Monument, specifically the Hagerman Horse Quarry, contains the largest concentration of these fossils.	1988	A mounted skeleton of the Hagerman horse within a wood-framed exhibit. Additional exhibits and wall fixtures can be seen in the background.
Fruit	Huckleberry	Several huckleberry species are native to Idaho (all belonging to genus Vaccinium), the most popular of which are black or thin-leaved huckleberry (Vaccinium membranaceum). The berries are difficult to grow commercially, as they can take up to 15 years to reach maturity, grow at specific elevations, and attempts to transplant often end in failure. However, attempts are underway to domesticate the berry. Students from Southside Elementary School proposed the huckleberry as the state fruit in 2000.	2000	Four red berries hanging from green bushes, with an abundance of green foliage in the background.
Gem	Star garnet	Star garnet, found only in Idaho and India, was designated as the state gem in 1967.	1967	A pink-colored gem with an irregular shape set on a purple background.
Gun	Winchester Model 1873	Idaho Voters Chose the Winchester Model 1873, also known as “The Gun That Won the West”, as their state gun in 2026.	2026	Winchester model 1873
Horse	Appaloosa	The Appaloosa breed became the state horse in 1975 following an introduction to the Legislature by sixth grade students from Eagle, Idaho.	1975	A horse faced toward the camera, with black fur covering most of the front of its body and black spotting on the white fur covering the back part of its body. Its mane and tail are solid black, and a pastoral setting appears on the background.
Insect	Monarch butterfly (Danaus plexippus)	The monarch became designated as the state insect after a bill proposed by fourth grade students at Cole Elementary in Boise was passed unanimously by State Senators.	1992	A butterfly with its wings spread, resting in green foliage. The butterfly is white and orange in color, with white spotting around the edges of its wings.
Motto	Esto perpetua	Translating to "Let it be perpetual" or "It shall be perpetual", Idaho's official motto was designated soon after the state was admitted to the Union in 1890. The phrase Esto perpetua is attributed to the Venetian theologian Pietro Sarpi. The motto appears on the state's seal and on its quarter as part of the 50 State Quarters program, which lasted 1999–2008.	1890	
Raptor	Peregrine falcon (Falco peregrinus)	Adopted as the state raptor by the Legislature in 2004, the peregrine falcon has a global distribution and can be found on each continent apart from Antarctica. Boise is home to the World Center for Birds of Prey, the headquarters for The Peregrine Fund, a non-profit organization founded in 1970 that conserves threatened and endangered birds of prey. The peregrine falcon appears on the Idaho state quarter.	2004	Head shot of a bird with yellow coloring around its black eye and beak, white plumage on its front, and dark plumage along its back.
Seal	Seal of Idaho	The Idaho Territory seal was adopted in 1863 and redrawn several times before statehood in 1890. The Great Seal was designed by Emma Edwards Green, the only woman to design a state seal. The seal depicts a woman, signifying justice, and a miner along with cornucopias, a pine tree, sheaf of grain, syringa, an elk's head, wheat and other imagery associated with the state.	1863	A circular seal with the text "Great Seal of the State of Idaho", along with a white star, within the outer ring. The inner ring contains a banner with the text "Esto perpetua", a woman in white holding a scale, a man dressed as a miner, and an elk's head above a shield containing a natural landscape. Below the woman and man are cornucopias, and a sheaf of grain is located under the shield.
Song	"Here We Have Idaho"	Music for the state song of Idaho was composed by Sallie Hume Douglas and copyrighted on November 4, 1915 under the name "Garden of Paradise". In 1917, University of Idaho student McKinley Helm wrote the verse which became the chorus, and Alice Bessee set the words to Douglas' music. The song, then known as "Our Idaho", became the university's alma mater. Albert J. Tompkins, director of music in the Boise Public Schools, wrote additional verses for the song, and in 1931 the Legislature designated "Here We Have Idaho" as the state song.	1931	—
Tree	Western white pine (Pinus monticola)	Adopted as a state symbol by the Legislature in 1935, western white pine is known for its "straight grain and soft even texture". In the United States, the largest remaining volume of this timber grows in Northern Idaho.	1935	Several pines emerging from a solid treeline, with a clear blue sky in the background.
Vegetable	Potato	The nation's leader in production, Idaho has become synonymous with potatoes Fourth grade students from Grand View Elementary school led the effort for the symbol in 2002, writing to all 105 lawmakers pushing for the bill.	2002	A sliced and a whole potato side by side, both dark brown with sprouts emerging.

== Unsuccessful proposals ==
Several symbols have been proposed for addition to the list of official state symbols but were not adopted. Prior to the designation of the cutthroat trout as the state fish, fourth grade students at Indian Creek Elementary School campaigned for the rainbow trout and the sturgeon. Another unsuccessful symbol included the silver tipped sagebrush as the state bush. In the 2010s, a student proposal for the rattlesnake as the state reptile was unsuccessful since farmer-legislators considered the snake a "pest".

== See also ==
- History of Idaho
- Index of Idaho-related articles
