= North American ice storm of January 1961 =

Weather event in the United States

Ice Storm of January 1961
Meteorological history
- Formed: January 1, 1961
- Dissipated: January 3, 1961

Winter storm
- Maximum snowfall or ice accretion: ~8 inches (freezing rain)

Overall effects
- Areas affected: northern Idaho

The North American ice storm of January 1961 was a massive ice storm that struck areas of the Idaho Panhandle in the United States on January 1–3, 1961. The storm set a record for thickest recorded ice accumulation from a single storm in the United States, at eight inches.

The storm's swath covered areas from Grangeville, Idaho, to the Canada–United States border. According to the National Weather Service, a combination of dense fog, sub-freezing temperatures, and occasional freezing rain led to the heavy ice accretions. Catastrophic damage to trees and utilities resulted in widespread power outages.

Prior to the storm, previous records of between four and six inches of ice were recorded in New York City and Texas.
