= Healthcare in Idaho =

Various forms of health insurance for children are available in the US State of Idaho. Medicaid is available, and there is also a scheme for assistance to families of State employees.

== Insurance coverage for low income families ==
A major contributor to covering children in the state of Idaho is Health Insurance Premium Assistance. This is an access card available for children. This access card allows parents to purchase private health insurance. This card is very useful and allows parents and families to purchase health insurance when their children meet the guidelines. It is meant to help make insurance more affordable to low waged families.

A low wage family, as classified by this program, would be a family whose income is mandatory Medicaid levels, but below 185 federal poverty level (FDL). These families also have to be employed by the State of Idaho, who they must be a spouse of an Idaho employee. When a child meets the eligibility conditions they qualify for at least $100 per month in premium assistance. A family that has more than three children are eligible to receive $300 per month, but they are required to pay deductibles, co-pays, and insurance premiums.

== Medicaid ==
Another program that the state of Idaho offers is Medicaid, which is direct coverage for children. In order for a children to receive Medicaid, they are reviewed on their health needs. Once enrolled, the person must undergo health screening, and is then placed into a primary care case management system. Medicaid consists of three different plans that are characterized to fit differing needs.

The principal plan for children is the Medicaid Basic Plan. “The Medicaid Basic Plan is for healthy low-income children and adults with eligible dependent children. This plan provides complete health, prevention, and wellness benefits for children and adults who don't have special health needs. Most Medicaid participants will be enrolled in this benefit plan.”

An expanded Medicaid program was passed in 2018 by Idaho voters to provide health care coverage to those who fell in the gap between traditional Medicaid coverage and qualifying for private insurance through the state health care exchange. In February 2025 House Bill 345 sought to change the requirements for participation in Idaho's expanded Medicaid program. Citing the program’s costs which have significantly exceeded lawmakers’ expectations: from $32 million in projected costs in 2018 to $110 million in fiscal year 2026, House Bill 345 was signed by Republican governor Little in March of 2025.

== See also ==
- Health insurance in the United States
- House Bill 345
