= Zoo Idaho =

Zoo in Pocatello, Idaho, United States

- Interactive map of Zoo Idaho
- 42.8427°N 112.4218°W
- Date opened: 1932
- Location: Pocatello, Idaho
- Land area: 25 acres (10 ha)
- No. of animals: 145
- No. of species: 40
- Website: zooidaho.org

Zoo Idaho is a zoo in Pocatello, Idaho, that features animals native to the Intermountain West and has been open since 1932.

The zoo has more than 100 animals representing about 40 different species. "It is one of two zoos in the United States specializing in animals native to the Intermountain West." Zoo Idaho is the only zoo to incorporate the Shoshone-Bannock tribal culture into its program and design. The zoo itself sits on a natural landscape covering 25 acres (10 ha) in Ross Park. For many of the exhibits there is a 40-foot (12 m) high lava cliff as a backdrop. The cliff divides the zoo into two levels known as Upper and Lower Ross Park.

It also offers 900-square-foot (84 m^{2}) tree house, 30-foot (9.1 m) high teepee, and a petting zoo area of barnyard animals. During the school year the zoo has established the Zoo Outreach Program, where employees bring a "piece of the zoo" into the classrooms of 3,000 school children each year. An additional 3,000 students visit the zoo on field trips in April and May alone. Zoo Idaho holds spring and summer programs and camps, which it holds in an outdoor classroom called the Tall Tales Tent.

== Expansion plans ==
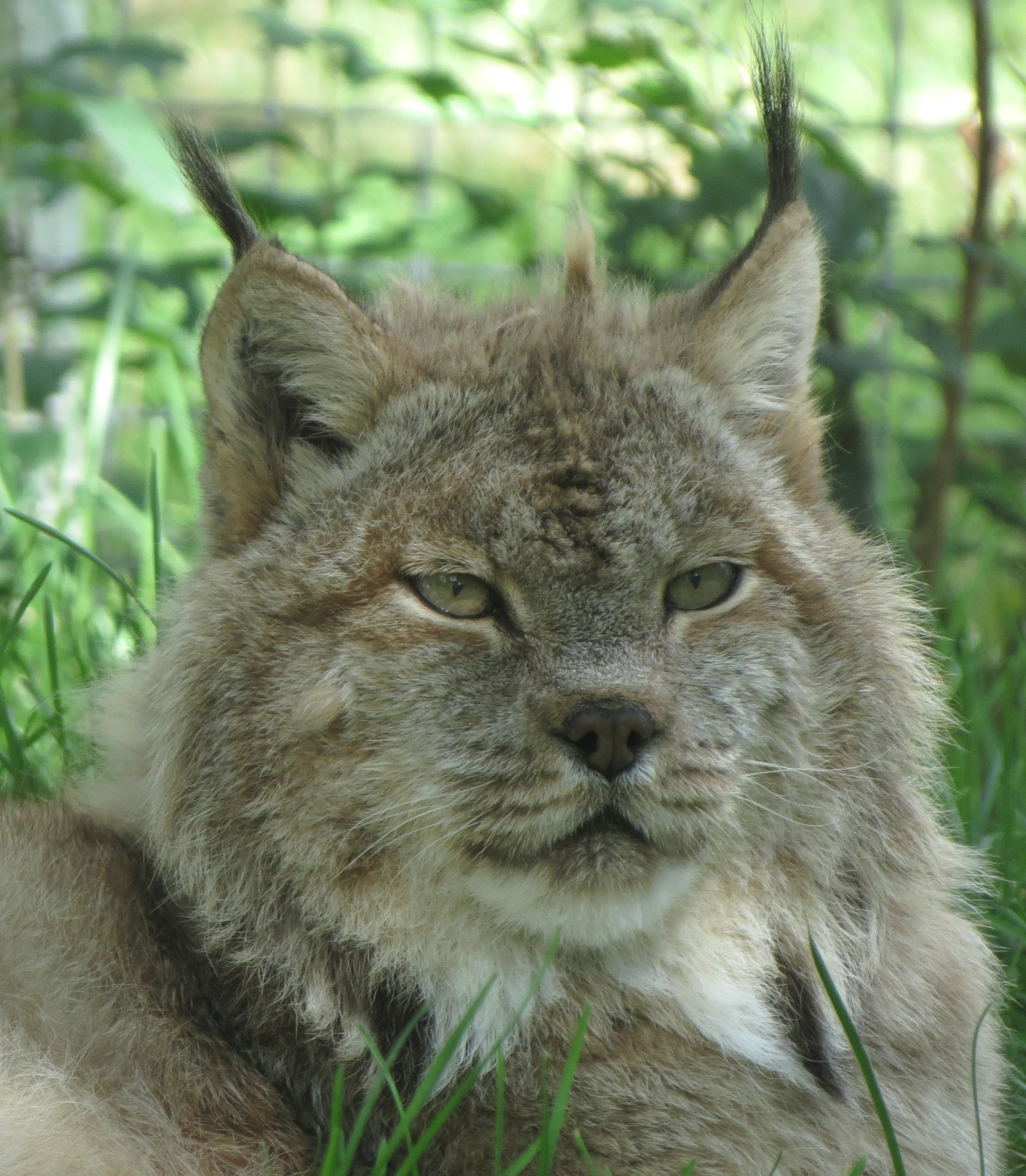
Lynx at the zoo

In 1999 the city of Pocatello worked with Basset Associates to develop a Master Plan Director's Report. This report looks at design goals and scope of master plan for exhibits and service facilities.

The zoo's 15-year plan estimates a cost of $15–$20 million. The total of Phase One will cost $2.5 million. 'Charlies' Place' will be a minimum of $1.9 million. The rest will go to the walkways, entrance, restrooms, gift shop, patio and a snack bar. Proceeds from the snack bar and gift shop will cover operation and maintenance costs associated with new and enhanced exhibits. The new Lynx exhibit is being funded by donations from the community.

A.	Grizzly Exhibit	$1,234,000
B.	Pedestrian Walkways, Landscaping and Graphics	$92,525
C.	Perimeter Fence	$44,825
D.	Utilities	$91,650
E.	Design and Contingency	$390,000
F.	ADA Accessibility Compliance	$100,000
G.	Entrance, Restrooms, Snack Bar, Gift Shop	$220,000
H.	Accreditation - American Zoo and Aquarium Association	$75,000
I.	Education Animal Holding	$25,000
J.	Campaign Expenses (estimated at 10%)	$227,000
	Total - Priority 1	$2,500,000
