= List of Idaho state forests =

The following is a list of Idaho state forests.

Name (by alphabetical order)	Location (of main entrance)
Floodwood State Forest	Shoshone County

== See also ==
- List of national forests of the United States
