= List of places in Idaho =

Lists of places in Idaho:

- List of places in Idaho: A–K
- List of places in Idaho: L–Z
