= List of amphibians and reptiles of Idaho =

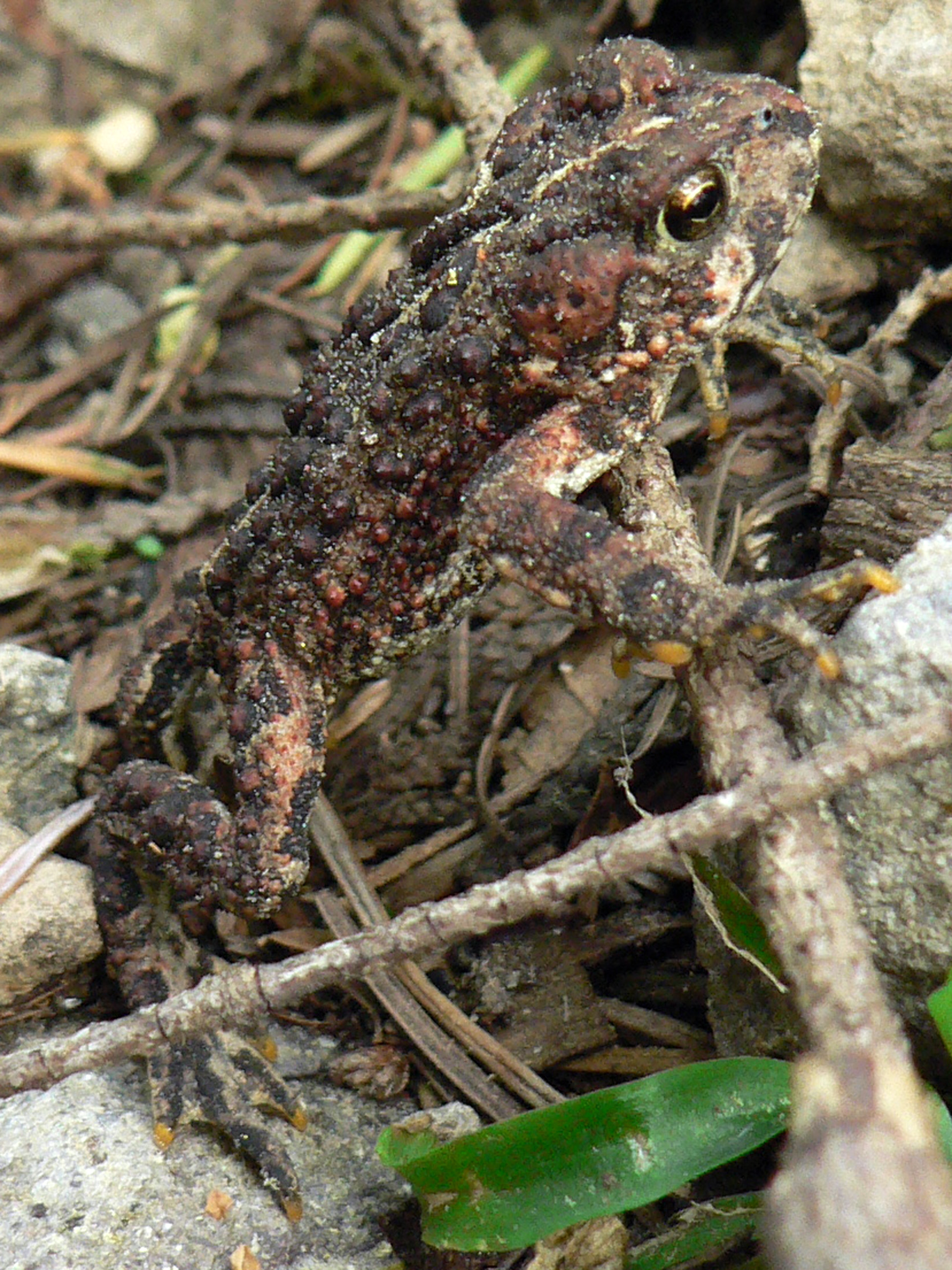
Western toad

Idaho is home to 15 amphibian species and 22 species of reptiles.

== Amphibians ==
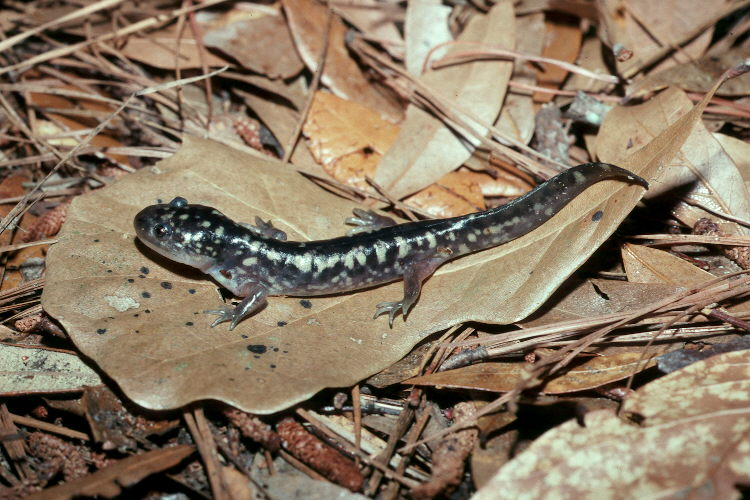
Tiger salamander

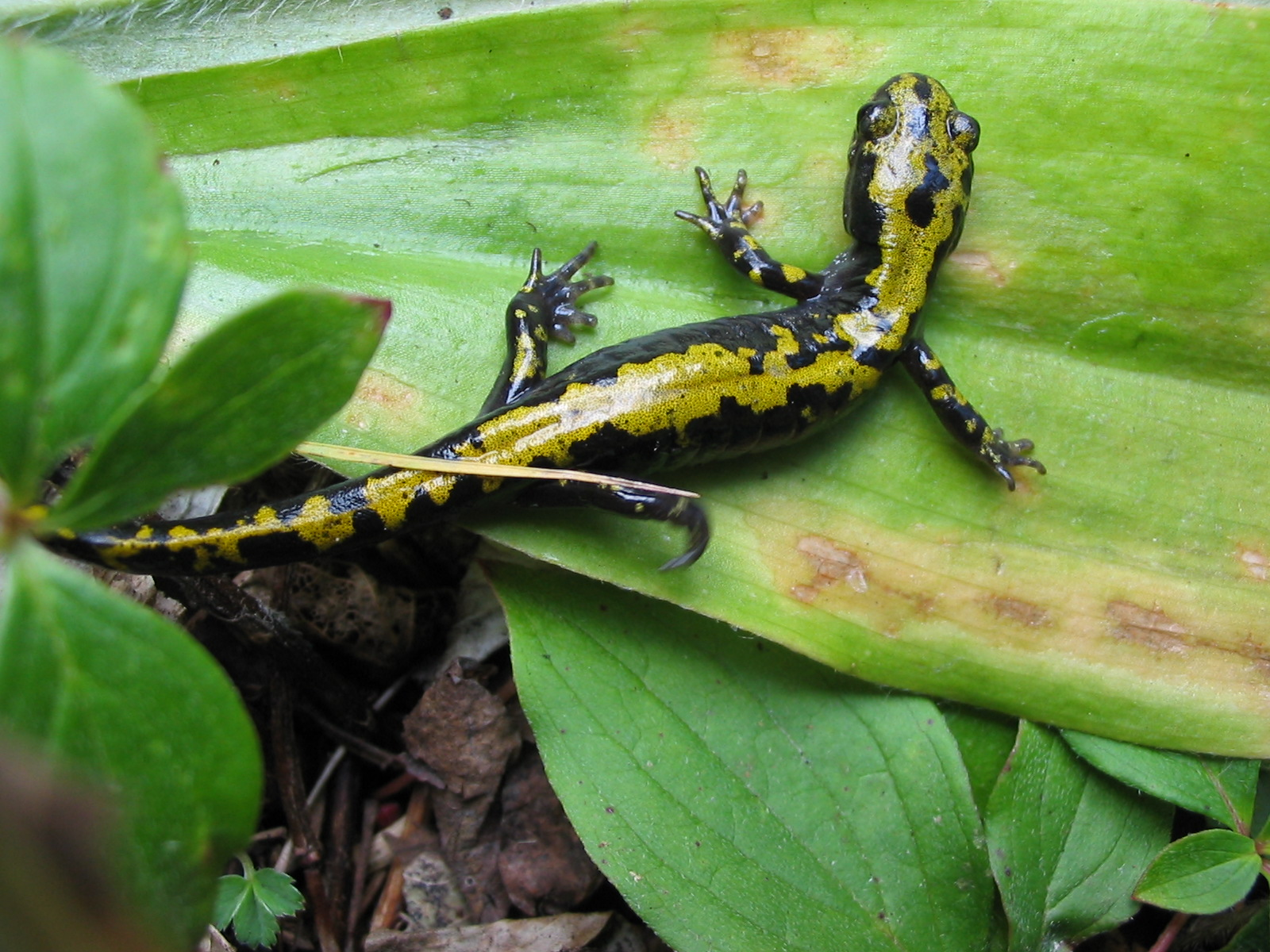
Long-toed salamander

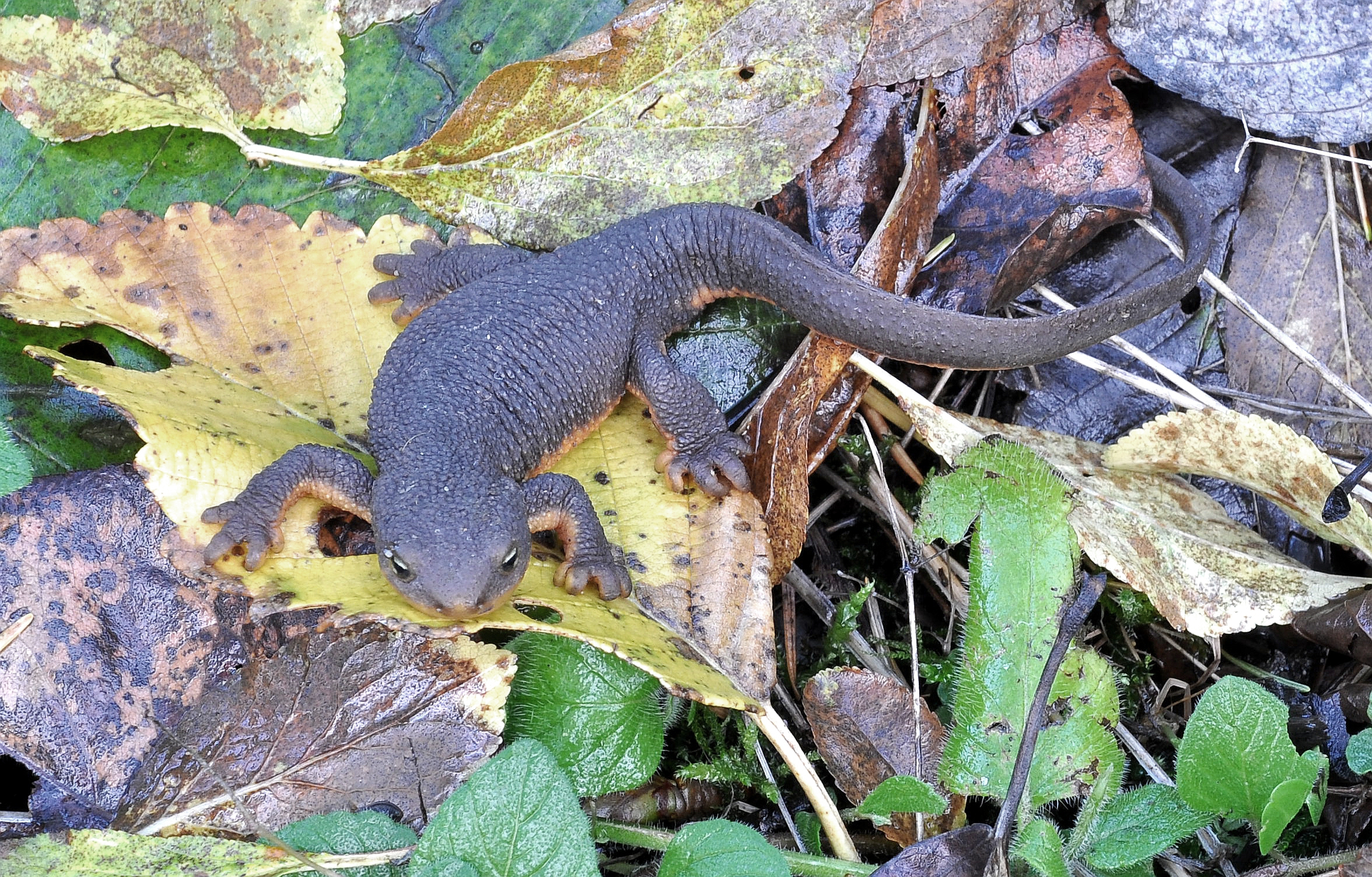
Rough-skinned newt

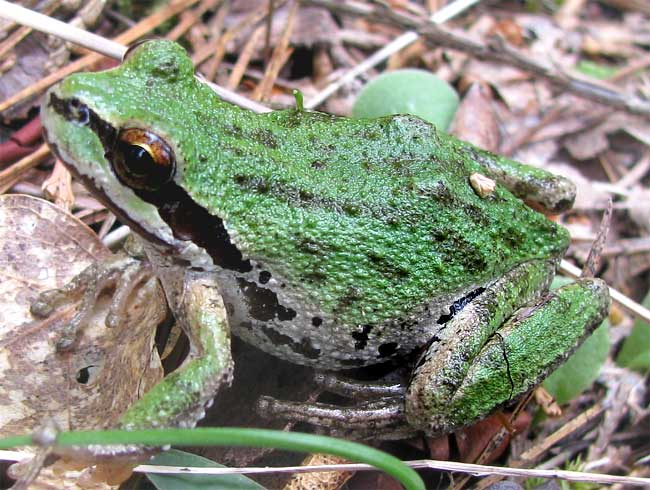
Pacific tree frog

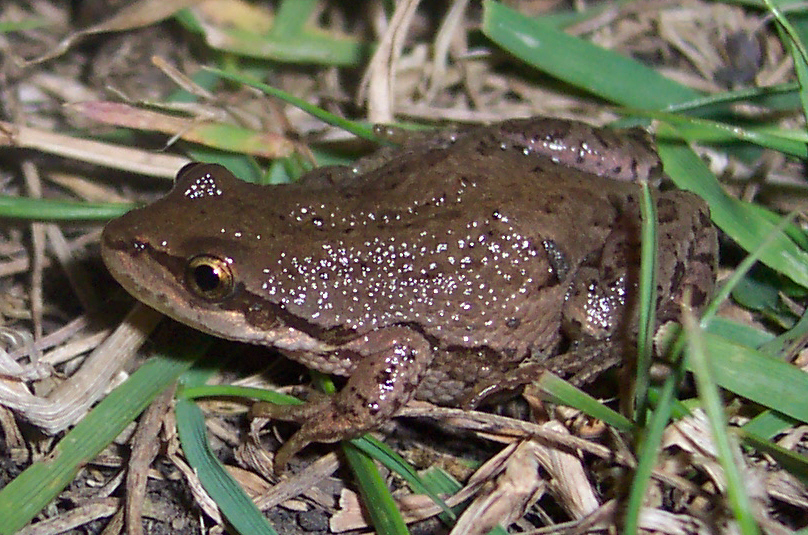
Boreal chorus frog

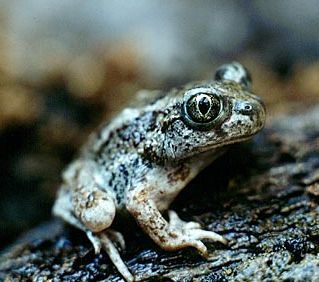
Great Basin spadefoot toad

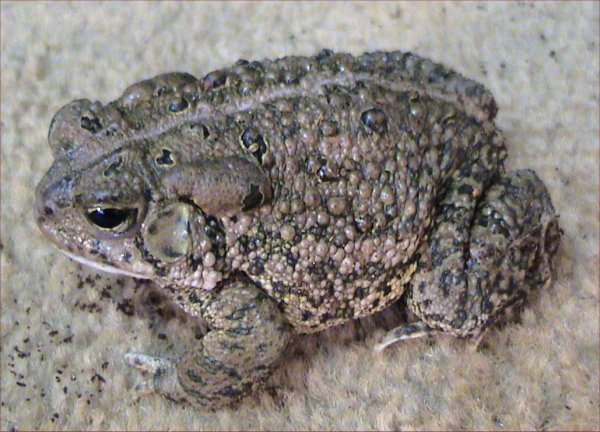
Woodhouse's toad

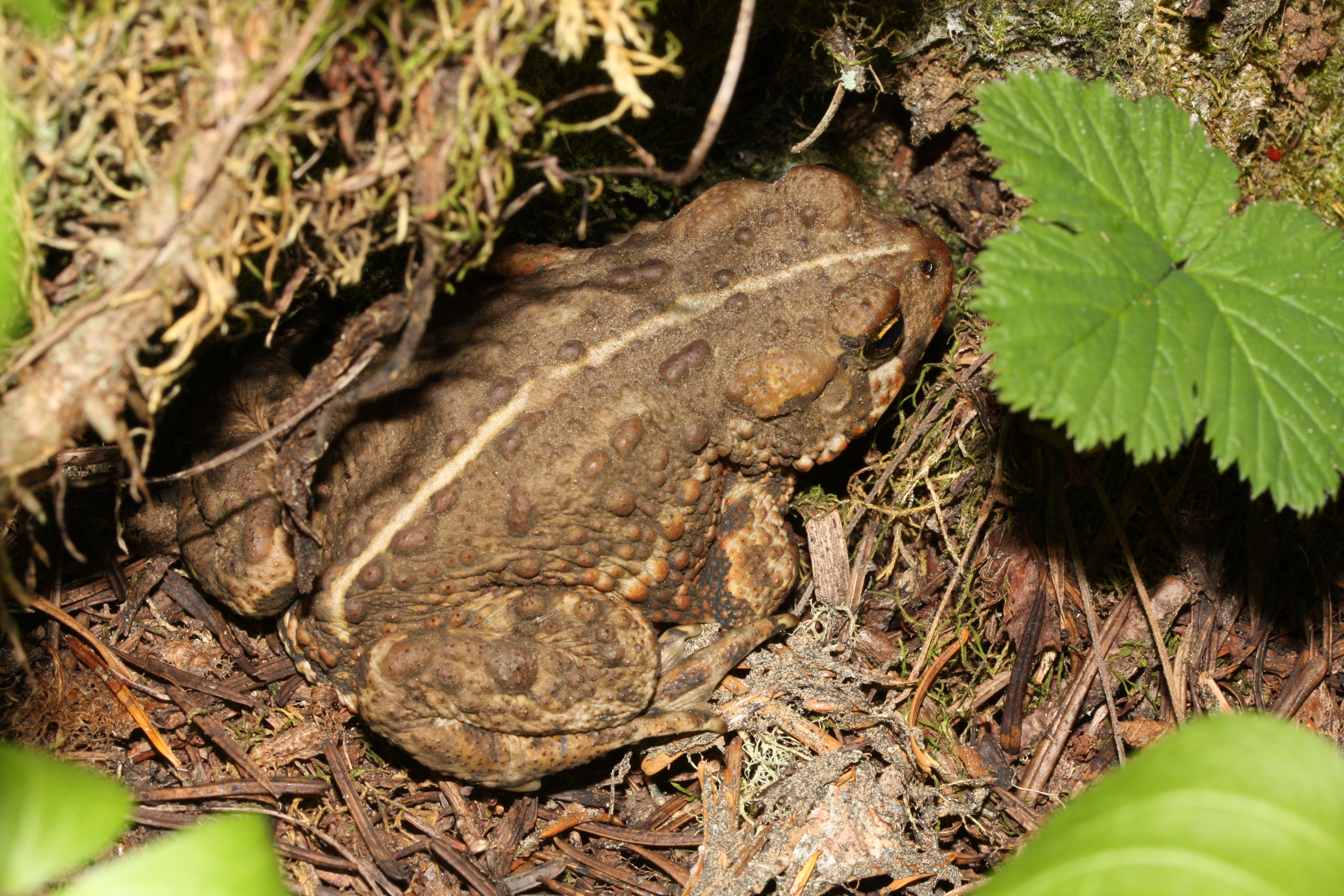
Western toad

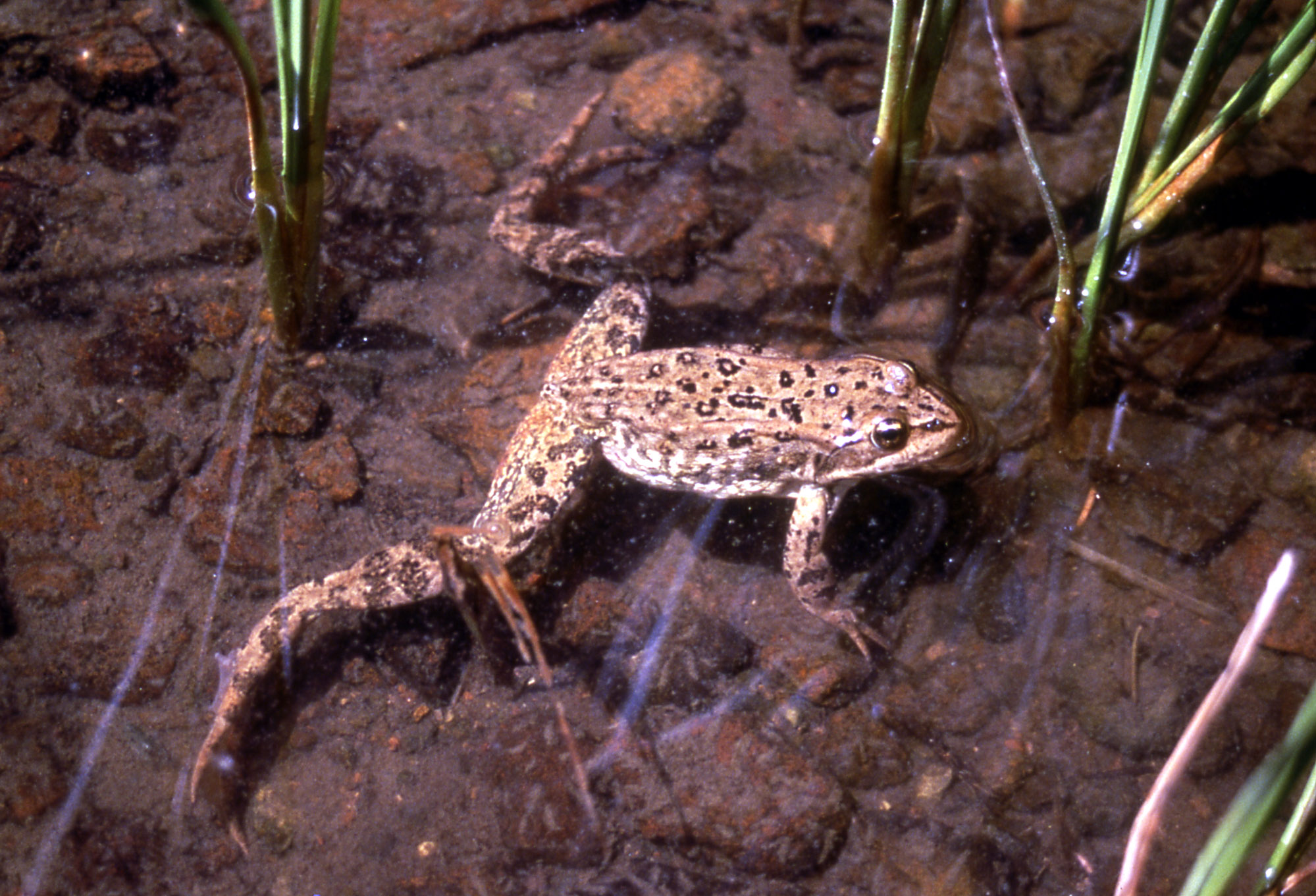
Columbia spotted frog

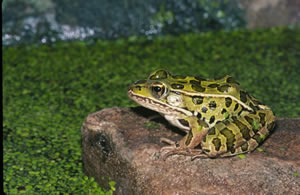
Northern leopard frog

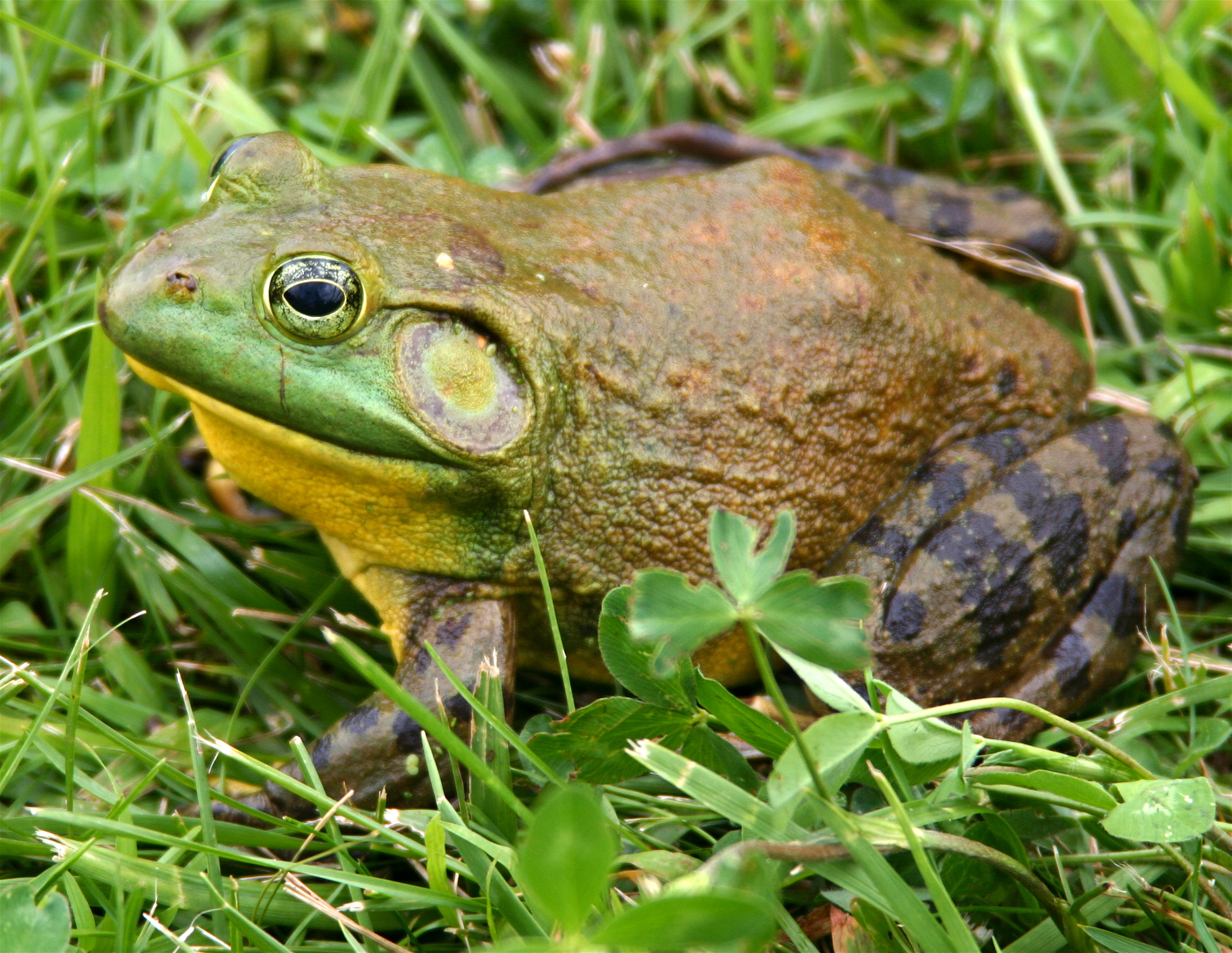
American bullfrog

=== Tiger salamander ===
The tiger salamander (Ambystoma tigrinum) is a species of mole salamander. Tiger salamanders are large, with a typical length of 6–8 inches. They can reach up to 14 inches in length, particularly neotenic individuals. Adults are usually blotchy with grey, green, or black, and have large, lidded eyes. They have short snouts, thick necks, sturdy legs, and long tails. Their diet consists largely of small insects and worms, though it is not rare for an adult to consume small frogs and baby mice. In Idaho, tiger salamanders can be found in suitable habitat in the eastern part of the state, the western edge of the panhandle and in some southwestern areas.

=== Long-toed salamander ===
The long-toed salamander (Ambystoma macrodactylum, Baird 1849) is a mole salamander in the family Ambystomatidae. This species, typically 4.1–8.9 cm (1 3/5–3½ in) long when mature, is characterized by its mottled black, brown and yellow pigmentation, and its long outer fourth toe on the hind limbs. The distribution of the long-toed salamander is primarily in the Pacific Northwest, with an altitudinal range of up to 2,800 metres (9,200 ft). It lives in a variety of habitats including temperate rainforests, coniferous forests, montane riparian zones, sagebrush plains, red fir forests, semi-arid sagebrush, cheatgrass plains, and alpine meadows along the rocky shores of mountain lakes. It lives in slow-moving streams, ponds and lakes during its aquatic breeding phase. The long-toed salamander hibernates during the cold winter months, surviving on protein energy reserves stored in the skin and tail. In Idaho, Long-toed Salamanders are the most widespread salamander species. They are found throughout northern and central Idaho.

=== Idaho giant salamander ===
The Idaho giant salamander, Dicamptodon aterrimus, is one of three closely related species to this taxon: D. ensatus, (California giant salamander), D. copei (Cope's giant salamander) and D. tenebrosus (coastal giant salamander) also known as the (Pacific giant salamander). The Idaho giant salamander is the darkest and most intricately blotched of the giant salamanders. Varying between brown, purple, tan, grey, and a copperish color, Idaho giant salamanders are large and robust predators. Tiger Salamanders and Idaho Giant Salamanders have superficial resemblance pertaining to size and shape, but the costal grooves and foot tubercles are significantly different between the two species. With a defining thick head and body along with a fourth toe on the hind foot with only three segments; this species of salamander has its own unique features. Adults are typically 20 cm in length but may vary between 7 and 11.75 inches long, but can be observed around 13 inches. The Idaho Giant Salamander is found in forested watersheds from lake Coeur d’Alene to the Salmon River.

=== Coeur d'Alene salamander ===
The Coeur d'Alene salamander, (Plethodon idahoensis) is a species of woodland salamander in the family of lungless salamanders (Plethodontidae). This species was once known as Plethodon vandykei idahoensis, a subspecies of Van Dyke's salamander localized in northern Idaho. While the majority of this species is localized in northern Idaho, there are some instances of capture/sighting in western Montana and southeastern British Columbia. Approximately 95% of observed populations in Idaho and Montana have been verified extant since 1987; the remainder may have [extirpated], however there is a general lack of knowledge on the population trends of the Coeur d'Alene salamander. In Idaho the Coeur d'Alene Salamander occurs in the northern part of the state.

=== Rough-skinned newt ===
The rough-skinned newt (Taricha granulosa) is a newt known for its strong poison. Habitats of rough-skinned newts are found throughout the West Coast of the United States and British Columbia. Their range extends south to Santa Cruz, California and north to Alaska. Rough-skinned newts are rare in Idaho and have only been found in several ponds near Moscow, Idaho where they may have been introduced.

=== Tailed frog ===
The tailed frogs (Ascaphus truei) are two species of frogs. The species are part of the genus, Ascaphus is the only taxon in the family Ascaphidae /æˈskæfɪdiː/. The "tail" in the name is actually an extension of the male cloaca. The tail is one of two distinctive anatomical features adapting the species to life in fast-flowing streams. It is the only North American frog that reproduces by internal fertilization. Until 2001, the genus was believed to be monotypic, the single species being the tailed frog (Ascaphus truei Stejneger, 1899). However, in that year Nielson, Lohman, and Sullivan published evidence in Evolution that promoted the Rocky Mountain tailed frog (Ascaphus montanus) from a subspecies to its own species. Since then, the former species has been formally called coastal tailed frog. In Idaho, tailed frogs are found throughout the central and north central forests of Idaho where suitable habitat is found.

=== Boreal chorus frog ===
The boreal chorus frog, (Pseudacris maculata) is a species of chorus frog native to Canada from the west of Lake Superior to western Alberta and north to the North West Territories. It occurs in the USA throughout Montana, northwestern Wisconsin, northeastern Arizona, northern New Mexico and southwestern Utah. This is a small species of frog, reaching about 30mm in length. It is highly variable however it is normally brown, but can be green on the dorsal surface, with 3 broken dorsal stripes, these stripes can be very distinct to quite faint. There is a dark band present from the snout, through the eye and continuing down the side. It has slightly enlarged toes discs to help in climbing small grasses and vegetation. In Idaho, the boreal chorus frog is found in the eastern portion of the state, and along the Snake River plain to the western border of the state.

=== Pacific tree frog ===
The Pacific tree frog (Pseudacris regilla) is a very common species of chorus frog, with a range from the West Coast of the United States (from North California, Oregon, and Washington) to British Columbia in Canada. Living anywhere from sea level up to over 10,000 feet, they are found in shades of greens or browns and even have been known to change between them. They live in many types of habitats and reproduce in aquatic settings. This species is also known as the Pacific chorus frog. In Idaho, the Pacific tree frog is found across much of the western and northern portions of the state.

=== Great Basin spadefoot toad ===
The Great Basin spadefoot (Spea intermontana) is a species of toad in the family Scaphiopodidae. The natural habitats of the Great Basin spadefoot include pinyon-juniper, ponderosa pine, and high elevation spruce-fir forests, semidesert shrubland, sagebrush flats, temperate grasslands, and deserts. They are present in agricultural areas as well. The Great Basin spadefoot can be found from southern British Columbia through the eastern portions of Washington and Oregon and in southern Idaho. Their range extends throughout all of Nevada and into most of Utah; they are also present in small areas in California, Arizona, Colorado, and Wyoming. In Idaho, the Great Basin spadefoot toad is distributed throughout the deserts, prairies of the southern portion of the state.

=== Western toad ===
The western toad or boreal toad (Bufo boreas) is a large toad species, between 5.6 and 13 cm (2.2 and 5.1 in) long, of western North America. It has a white or cream dorsal stripe, and is dusky gray or greenish dorsally with skin glands concentrated within the dark blotches. In Idaho, western toads are widely distributed in and can be found in appropriate habitat throughout most of the state.

=== Woodhouse's toad ===
Woodhouse's toad, (Bufo woodhousii) is a medium-sized (4 inches or 10 centimetres) true toad, which is native to the United States and Mexico. There are two recognized subspecies. The epithet woodhousii is in honor of the American physician and naturalist Samuel Washington Woodhouse. B. woodhousii tends to hybridize with Bufo americanus in their overlapping ranges. In Idaho, Woodhouse's toads occur in the western portion of the state, particularly along the Snake River and its associated drainages.

=== American bullfrog ===
The American bullfrog (Lithobates catesbianus or Rana catesbeiana), often simply known as the bullfrog in Canada and the United States, is an aquatic frog, a member of the family Ranidae, or "true frogs", native to much of North America. This is a frog of larger, permanent water bodies, swamps, ponds, and lakes, where it is usually found along the water's edge. On rainy nights, bullfrogs, along with many other amphibians, travel overland, and may be seen in numbers on country roads. In Idaho, bullfrogs are found in the Snake River Plain in the western portion of the state and in the western part of the panhandle.

=== Columbia spotted frog ===
The Columbia spotted frog (Rana luteiventris) is a North American species of frog. It is a medium-sized frog reaching lengths of up to three and a half inches (89 mm). Its color ranges from a dark, olive green to light brown with irregularly-shaped black spots on its back and legs (rendering its name). The belly and upper lip are white in color. Individuals can be distinguished from other Rana species by their shorter back legs, narrow snout and upturned eyes. Since they spend most of their time in the water, they also have more webbing in their hind feet than similar species. In Idaho, Columbia spotted frogs are found throughout much of the northern part of the state and some isolated populations in southwestern Idaho.

=== Northern leopard frog ===
The northern leopard frog (Lithobates pipiens)) is a species of Leopard frog from the true frog family native to parts of Canada and United States. The northern leopard frog is a fairly large species of frog reaching about 11 centimeters (4.3 inches) in length. It varies from green to brown in dorsal colour with large dark circular spots on its back, sides and legs. Northern leopard frogs have a wide range of habitats. They are found in permanent ponds, swamps, marshes and slow moving streams throughout forest, open and urban areas. They normally inhabit water bodies with abundant aquatic vegetation. They are well adapted to cold and can be found above 3,000 meters (9,800 feet) asl. This species was once quite common through parts of western Canada until declines started occurring during the 1970s. The population decline is thought to have been caused by pollution drift from the United States falling in the form of acid rain. Many populations of northern leopard frogs have not yet recovered from these declines. In Idaho, they are found throughout much of the southern part of the state along the Snake River plain. Populations also exist in the northern portion of the panhandle.

=== Wood frog ===
The wood frog (Rana sylvatica) has a broad distribution over North America, extending from the southern Appalachians to the boreal forest with several notable disjunct populations including lowland eastern North Carolina. In Idaho, wood frogs are found only in Boundary and Bonner counties.

== Reptiles ==
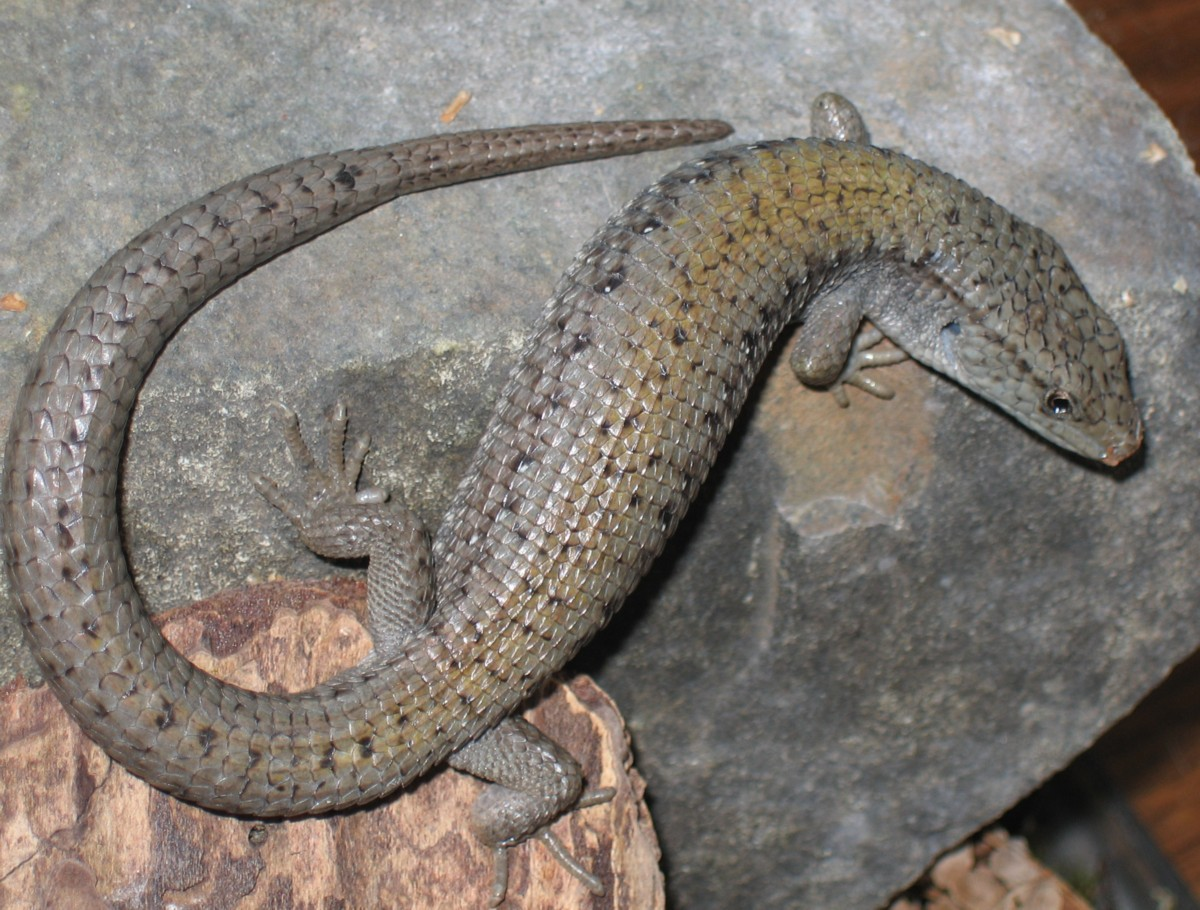
Northern alligator lizard

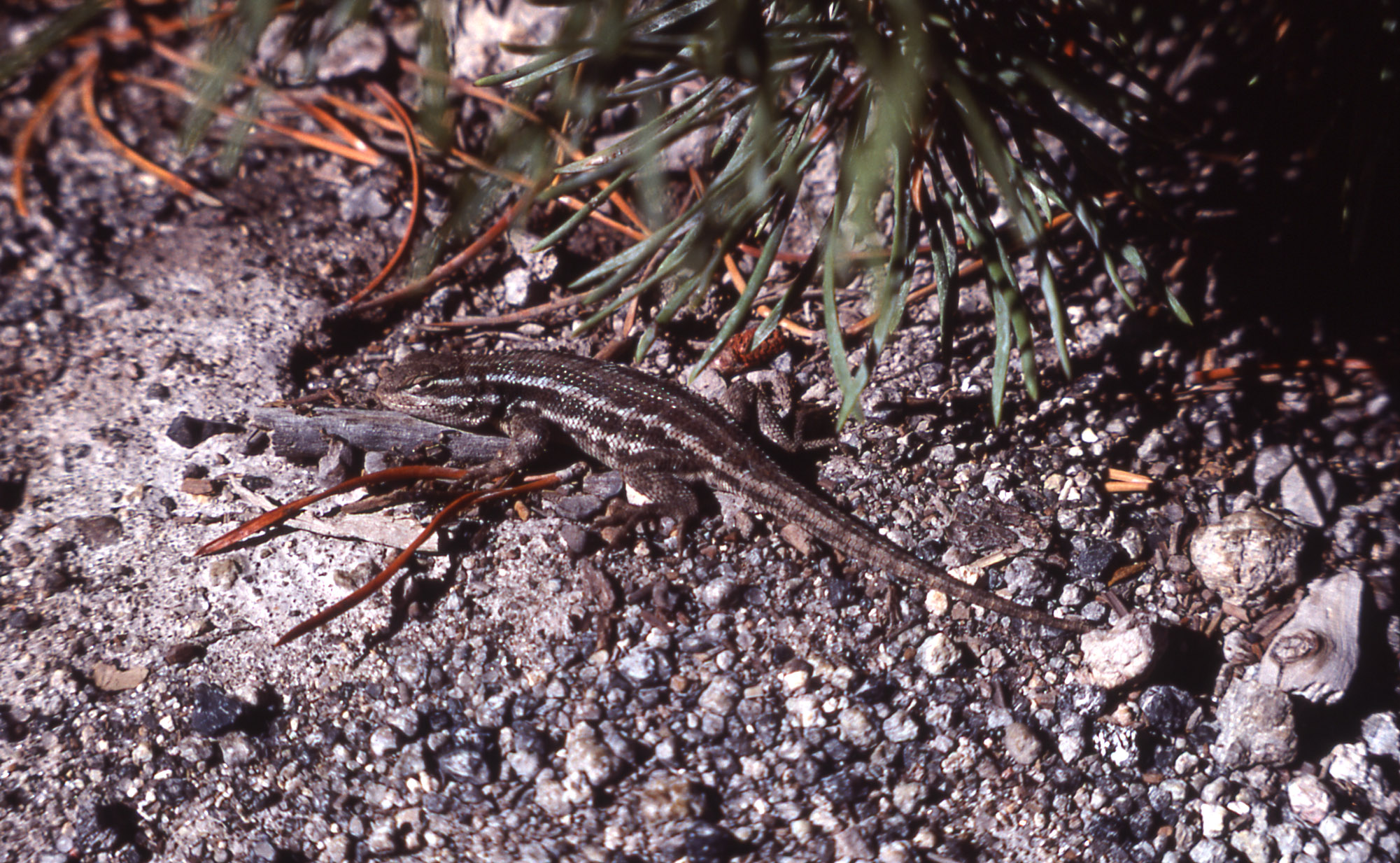
Sagebrush lizard

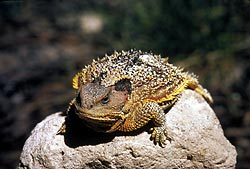
Short-horned lizard

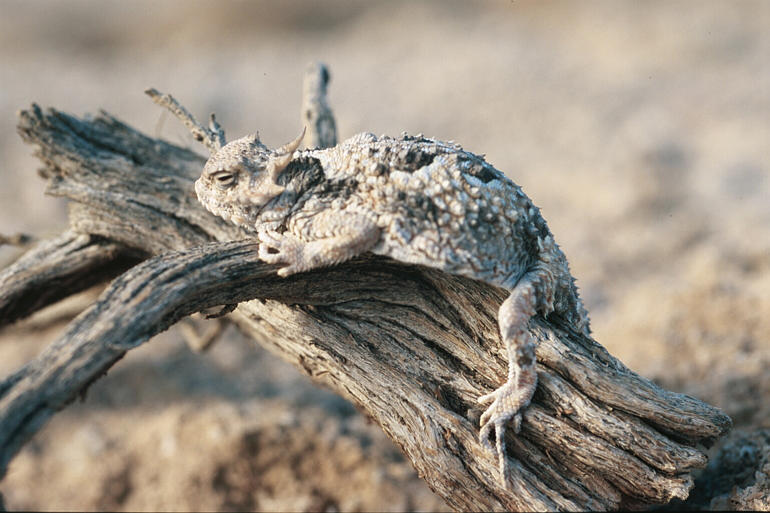
Desert horned lizard

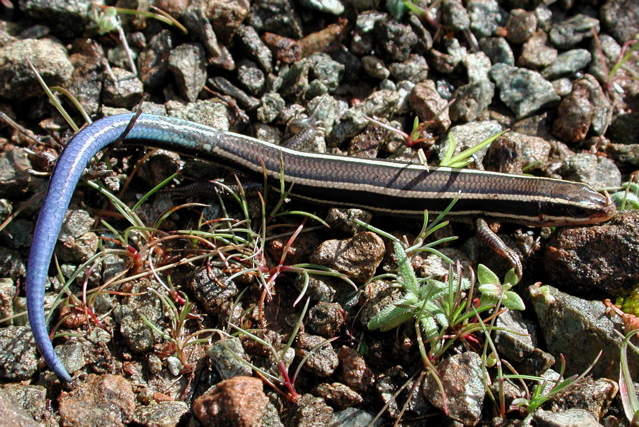
Western skink

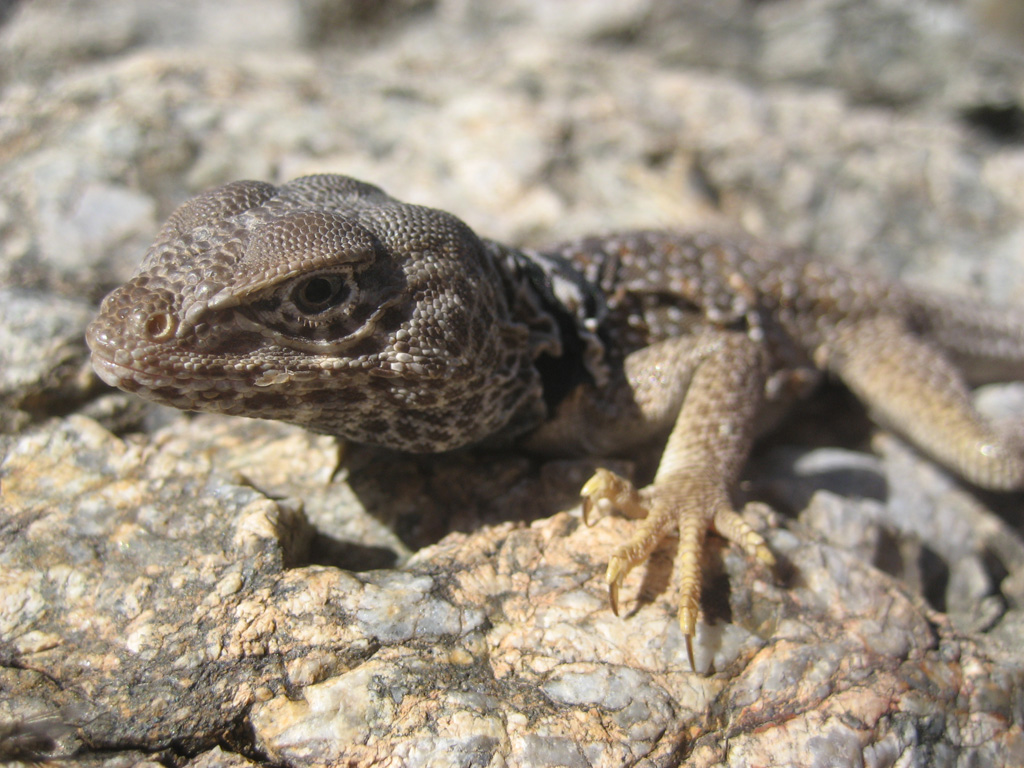
Collared lizard

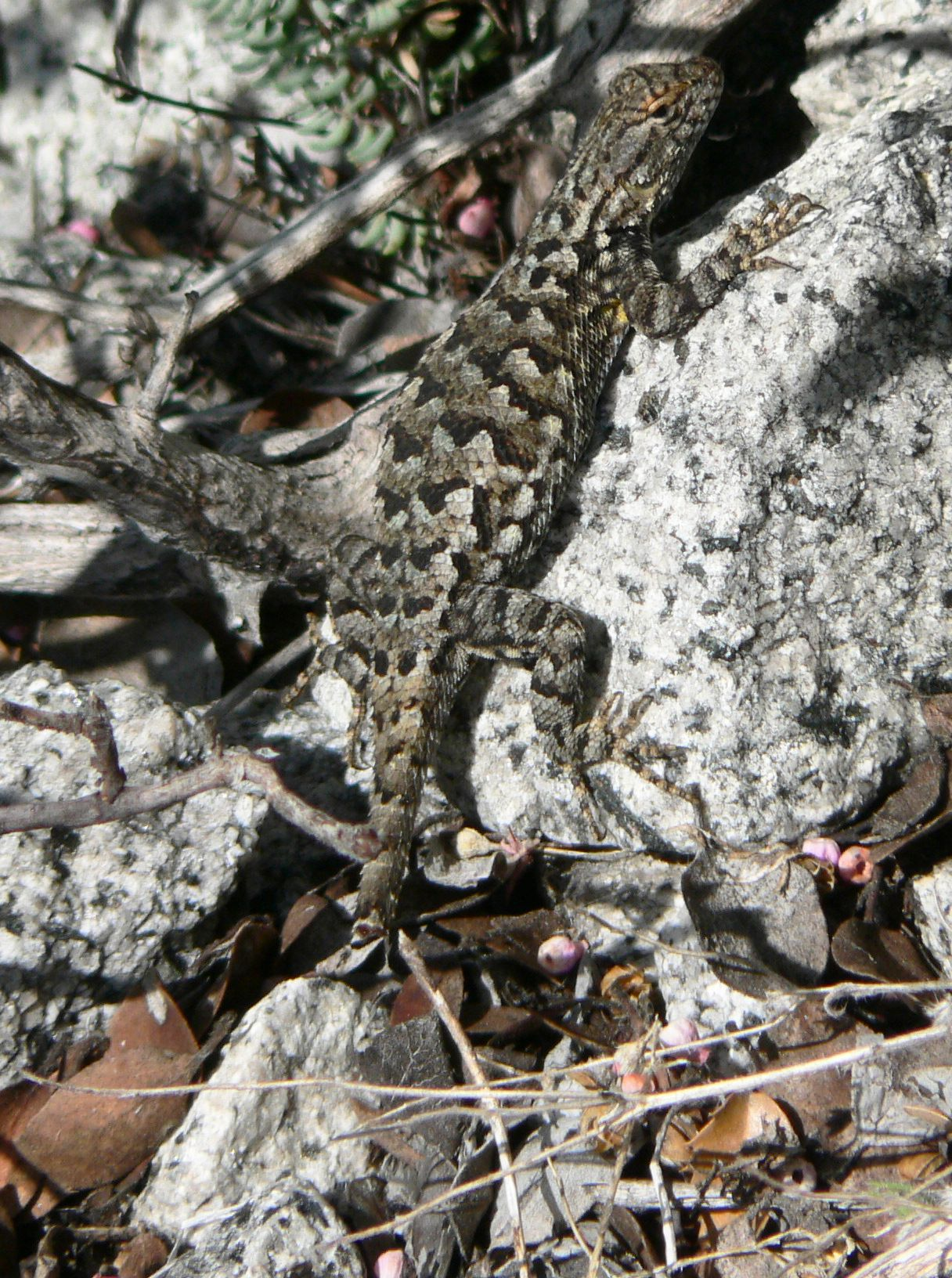
Western fence lizard

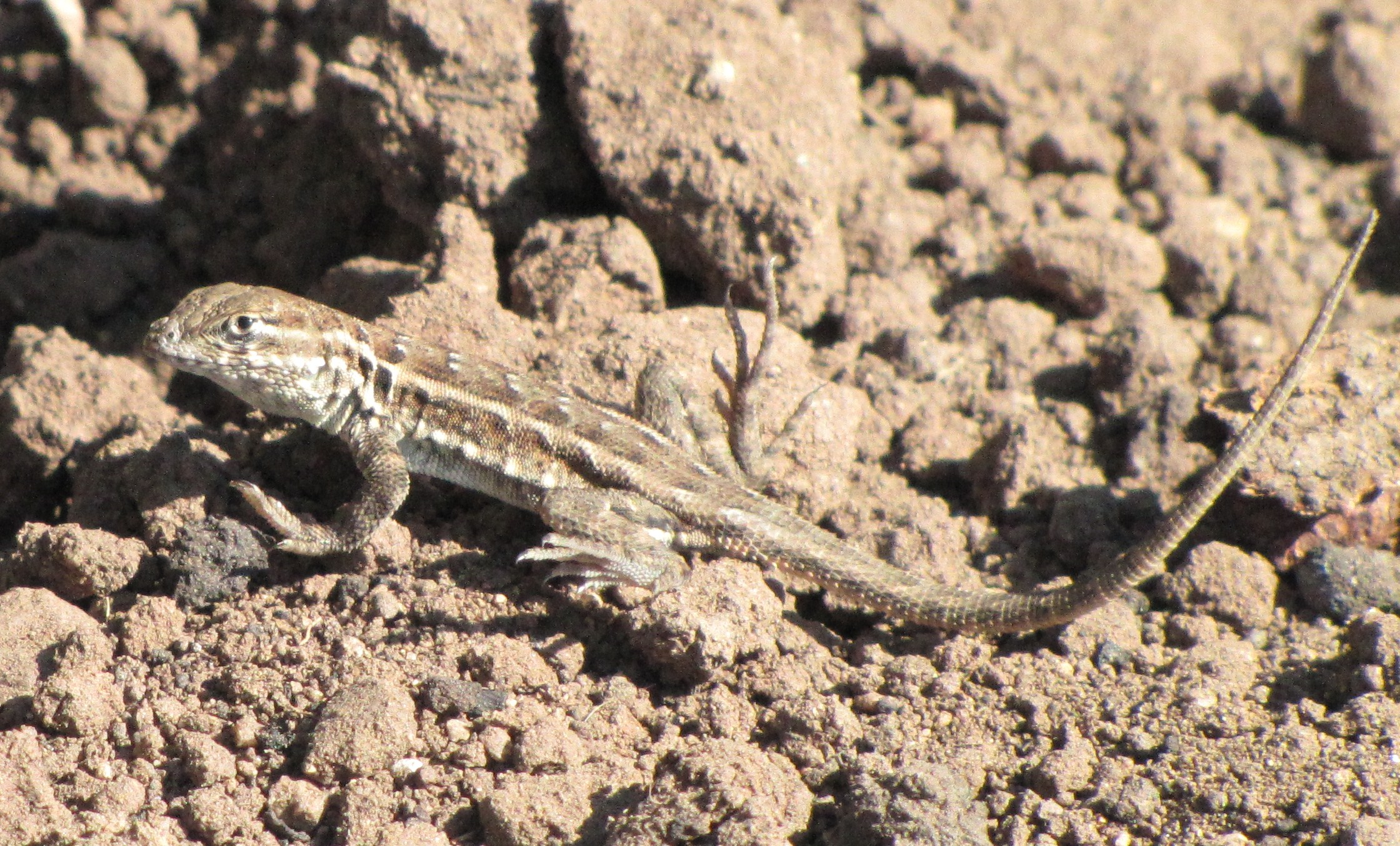
Side-blotched lizard

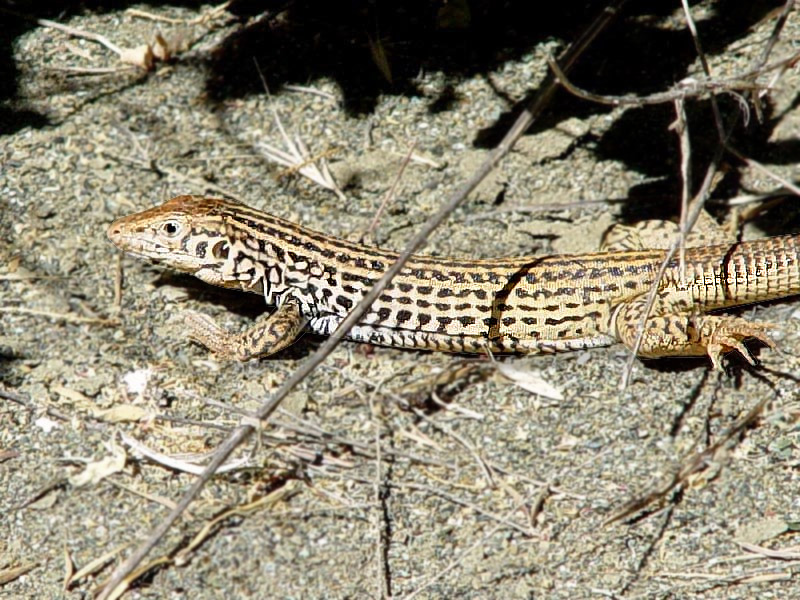
Western whiptail lizard

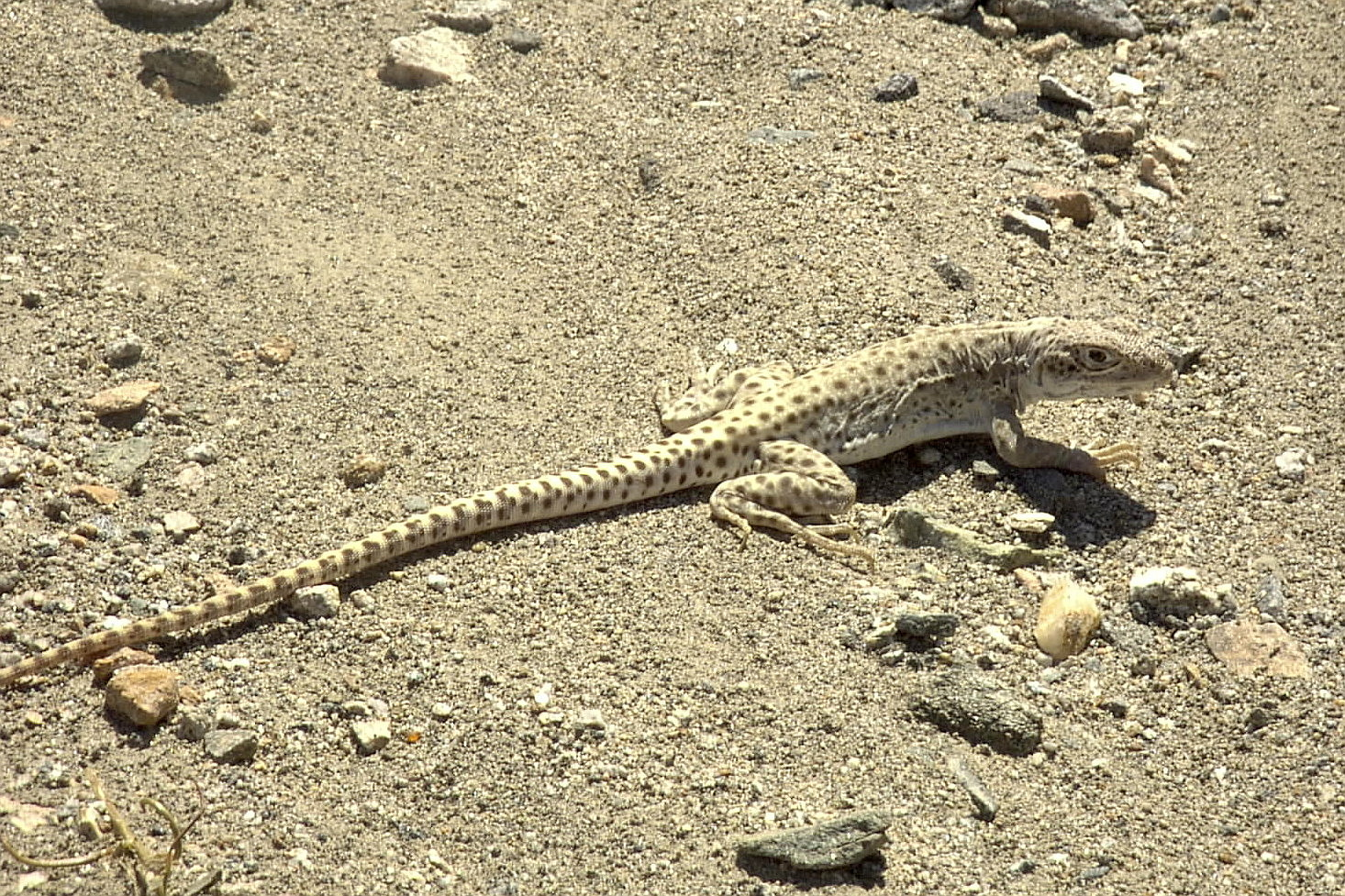
Long-nosed leopard lizard

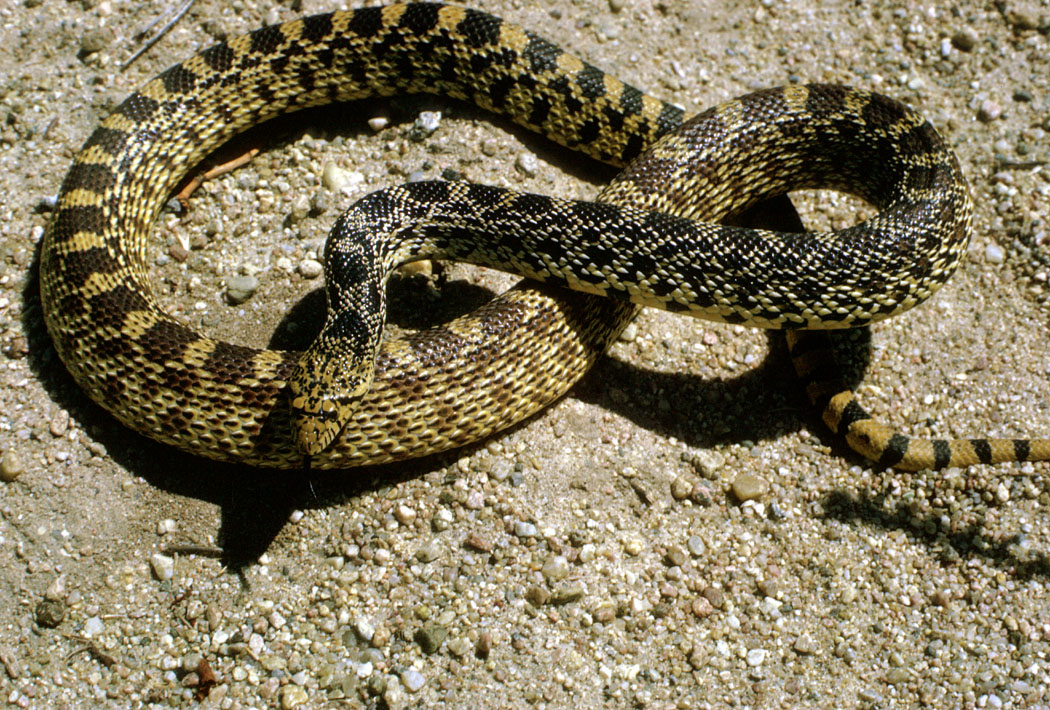
Gopher snake

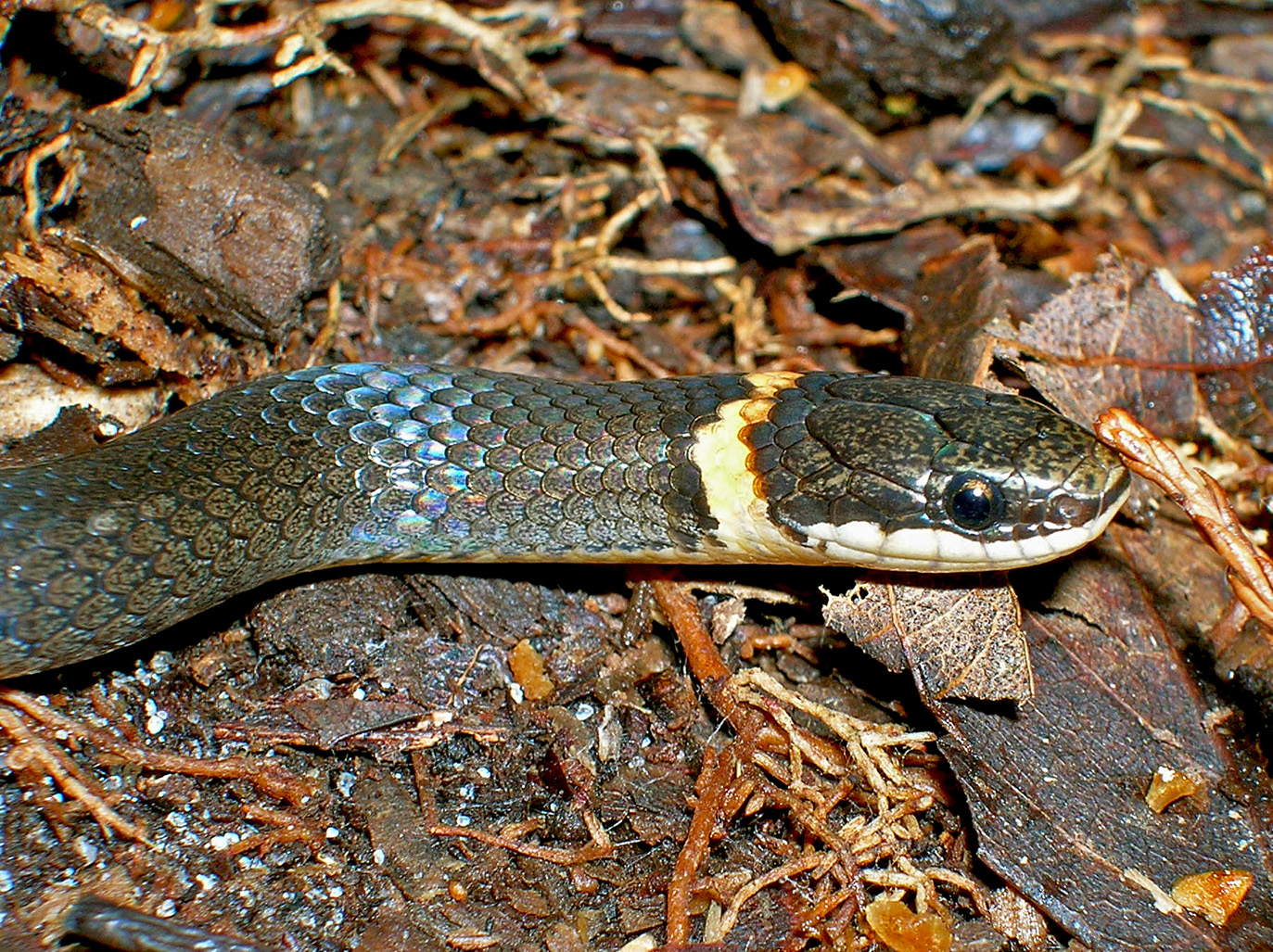
Ring-neck snake

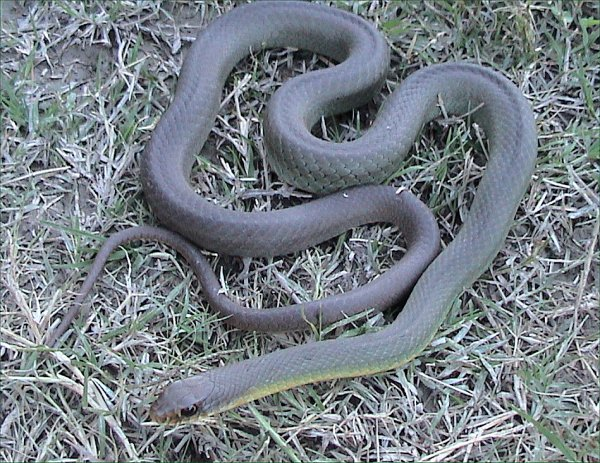
Eastern racer

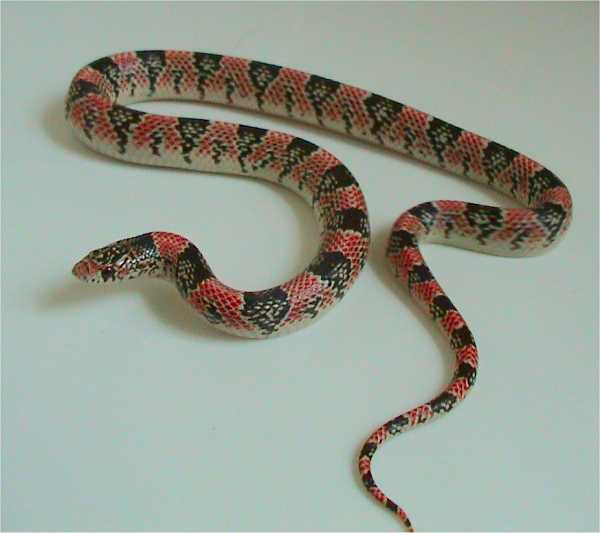
Long-nosed snake

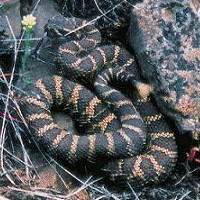
Northern Pacific rattlesnake

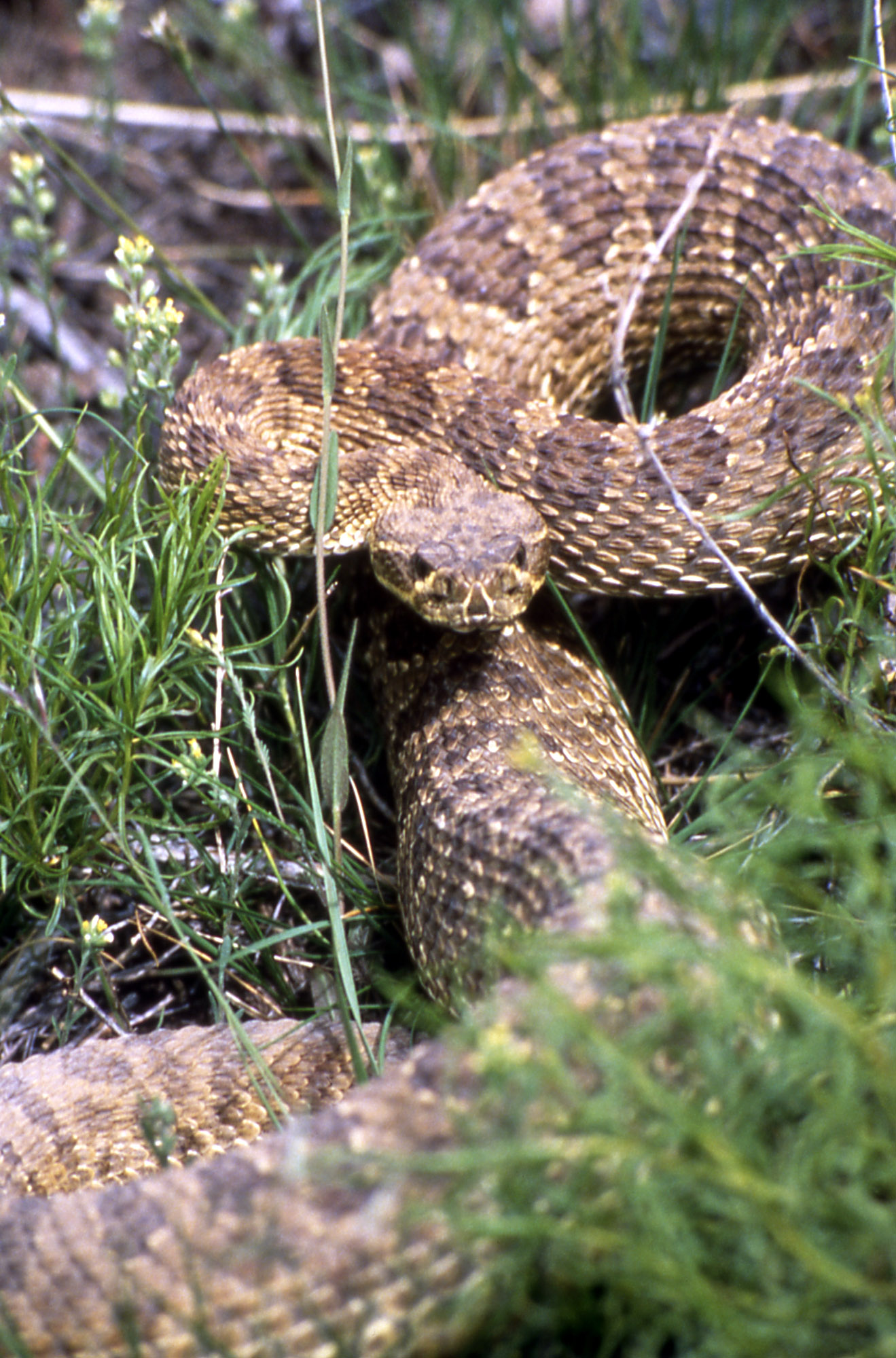
Prairie rattlesnake

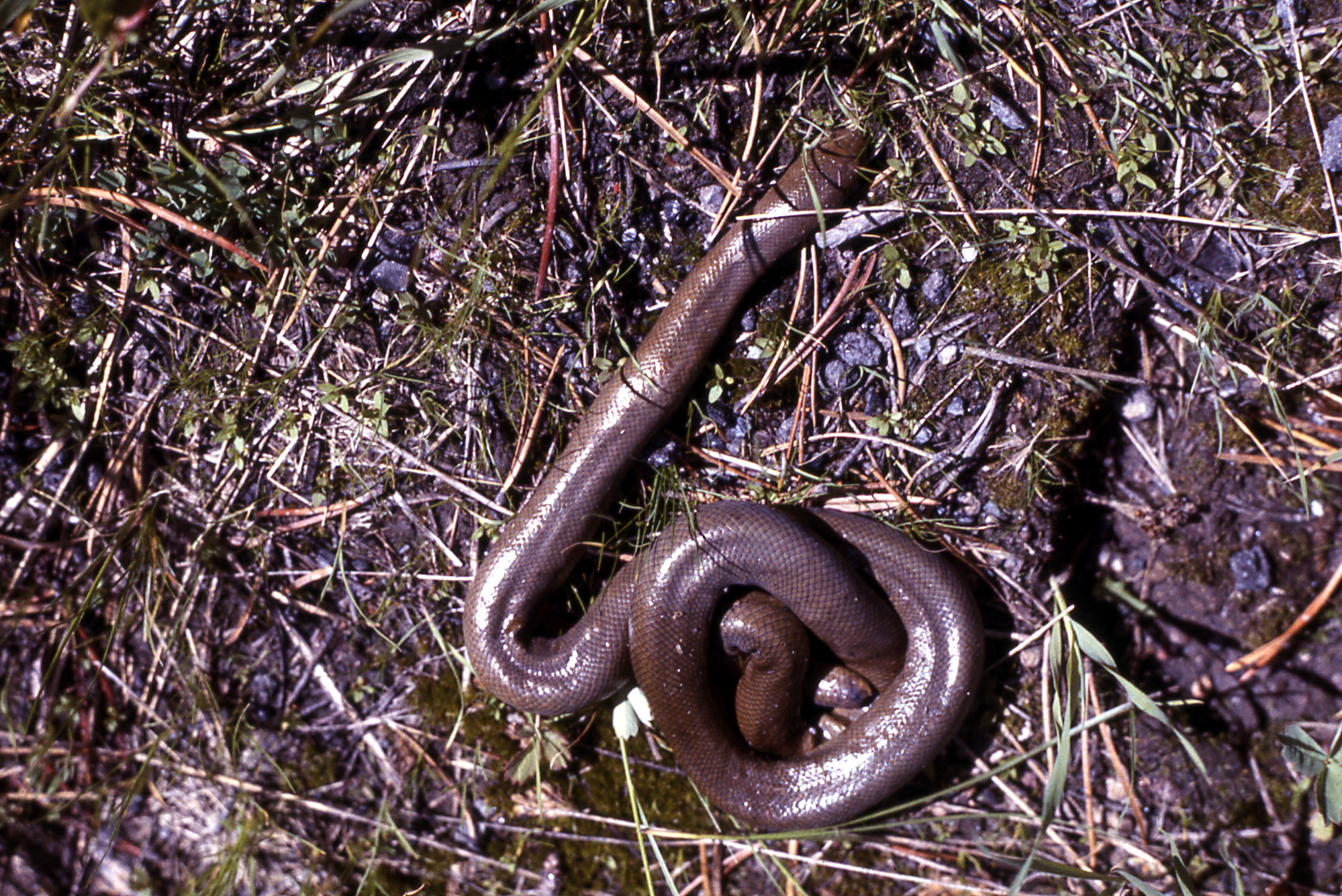
Rubber boa

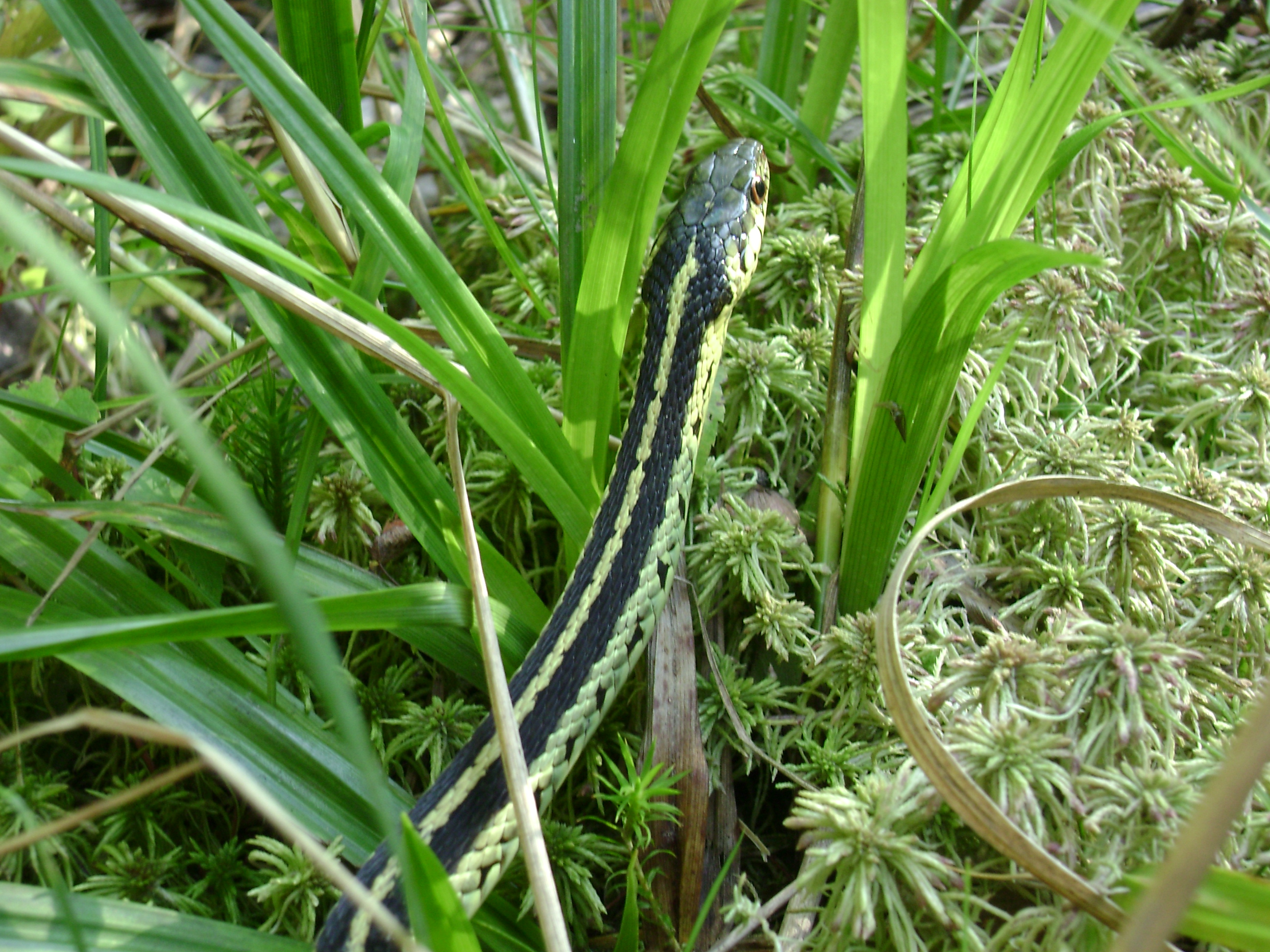
Common garter snake

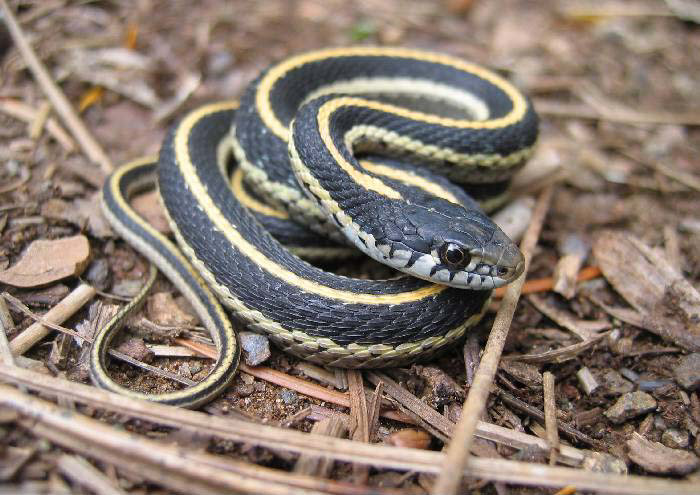
Terrestrial garter snake

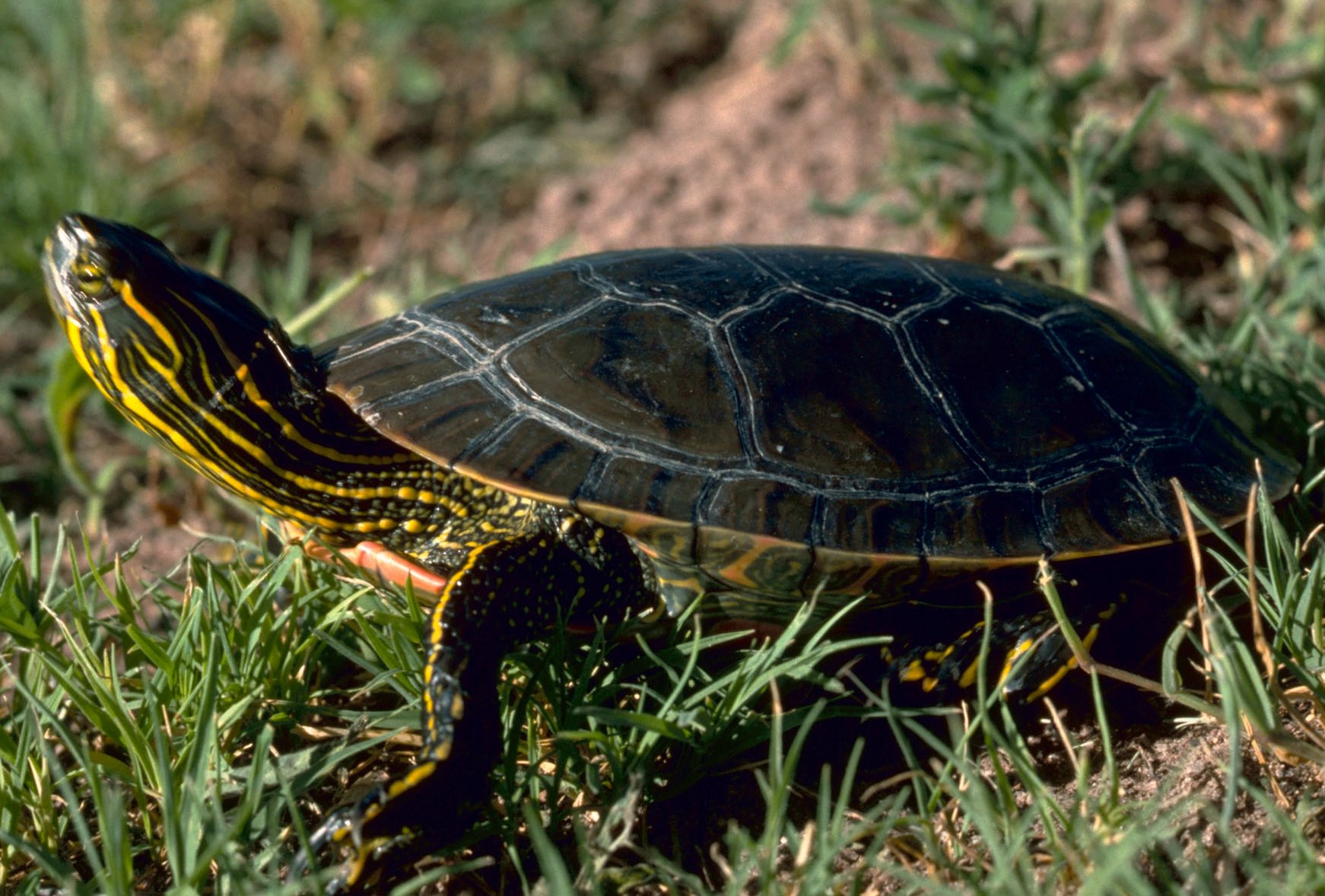
Western painted turtle

=== Northern alligator lizard ===
The northern alligator lizard (Elgaria coerulea) is a medium-sized lizard that occurs on the North American west coast. Northern alligator lizards are medium-sized slender lizards. Adults reach a snout-to-vent length of about 10 cm (4 in) and a total length of roughly 25 cm (10 in). They have a distinct skin fold on their sides, separating the keeled scales on the back from the smooth ventral scales. They are brownish in color and often have dark blotches that sometimes blend together into bands. they do some times bite. The belly is light gray. The eyes are dark. The northern alligator lizard occurs along the Pacific Coast and in the Rocky Mountains from southern British Columbia through Washington, northern Idaho and western Montana south through Oregon to the coastal range and the Sierra Nevada in central California.

=== Mojave black-collared lizard ===
The Great Basin collared lizard, (Crotaphytus bicinctores) is a species of lizard known also as the Mohave black collared lizard. It is very similar to the common collared lizard, Crotaphytus collaris, in shape and size, but it lacks the bright extravagant colors. Males can be brown to orange and some red or pink on the belly. Females are more black or dark brown. C. bicintores have elongated scales near the nails and their tail is more triangular in shape than round as with C. collaris. Crotaphytus bicinctores utilizes external energy for their body heat. In Idaho, Mojave black-collared lizards are found in southwestern portion of the state, along the Snake River Plain and surrounding Owyhee foothills.

=== Long-nose leopard lizard ===
The long-nosed leopard lizard, Gambelia wislizenii, is a relatively large lizard ranging from 3 1/4-5 3/4 inches (8.2-14.6 cm). It has a large head, long nose, and a long round tail that can be longer than its body. It is closely related to the "blunt-nosed leopard lizard" which closely resembles the long-nosed leopard lizard in body proportions, but has a conspicuously blunt snout. They were once considered part of the genus Crotaphytus. The epithet wislizenii is in honor of the German-American surgeon and naturalist Frederick Adolph Wislizenus, who caught the first specimen near Santa Fe, New Mexico. In Idaho the longnose leopard lizard can be found in suitable habitat across much of southern portion of the state.

=== Common sagebrush lizard ===
The sagebrush lizard (Sceloporus graciosus graciosus) is a common lizard found in mid to high latitudes in the Western United States of America. It belongs to the genus Sceloporus (spiny lizards) in the family Phrynosomatidae. Named after the sagebrush plants near which it is commonly found, the sagebrush lizard has keeled and spiny scales running along its dorsal surface.

In Idaho, sagebrush lizards can be found in appropriate habitat across most of the southern portion of the state.

=== Short-horned lizard ===
The pygmy short-horned lizard (Phrynosoma douglasii) is a small lizard that occurs in North America. Like other horned lizards, it is often wrongly called the "horned toad", but it is not a toad at all. It is a reptile, not an amphibian. In Idaho, the pygmy short-horned lizard can be found predominately in southern Idaho, with historic records in northwestern Idaho as well (Nussbaum et al. 1983).

=== Desert horned lizard ===
The desert horned lizard (Phrynosoma platyrhinos) is a species of phrynosomatid lizard native to western North America. They are often referred to as "horned toads", although they are not toads, but lizards. They typically range from southern Idaho in the north to northern Mexico in the south. There are considered to be two subspecies: the northern desert horned lizard (Phrynosoma platyrhinos platyrhinos) ranging in Idaho, Wyoming, Utah, Nevada, the Colorado front range, and parts of southeastern Oregon; and the southern desert horned lizard (Phrynosoma platyrhinos calidiarum) ranging in southern Utah and Nevada to southeast California, western Arizona, and northern Baja California. In Idaho, desert horned lizards are restricted found only in the southwestern portion of the state.

=== Western skink ===
The western skink (Plestiodon skiltonianus) is a small, smooth-scaled lizard with relatively small limbs, measuring about 100 to 200 mm long. Western skinks are very adaptable. They spend much of their day basking in the sun. Their diet ranges widely, including spiders and beetles. Western skinks will bite if grasped and will flee if they feel threatened. It is a common but secretive species whose range extends throughout Washington, Oregon, Nevada, Utah, and Wyoming and into western Montana and northern Arizona. It is widespread in northern California but restricted to the coast in central and southern California. Found in a variety of habitats, this lizard is most common in early successional stages or open areas of late successional stages. Heavy brush and densely forested areas are generally avoided. Western skinks are found from sea level to at least 2,130 m (6,990 ft). This diurnal reptile is active during the warm seasons. In Idaho, western skinks are found across much of the state, with the exception of the southwestern corner, and the southeastern edge of the state.

=== Western fence lizard ===
The western fence lizard (Sceloporus occidentalis) is a common lizard of California and the surrounding area. Because the ventral abdomen of an adult is characteristically blue, it is also known as the blue-belly. Immature western fence lizards have aquamarine-colored bellies. It is a member of the genus Sceloporus, and therefore is a spiny lizard. Although California is the heart of the range of this lizard, it is also found in eastern and southwest Oregon, as well as in the Columbia River Gorge, southwest Idaho, Nevada, western Utah, and northwestern Baja California, and some of the islands off the coast of both California and Baja California. The western fence lizard occupies a variety of habitats. It is found in grassland, broken chaparral, sagebrush, woodland, coniferous forest, and farmland, and occupies elevations from sea level to 10,800 ft. They generally avoid the harsh desert. In Idaho, western fence lizards are found across the lower, western half of the state.

=== Side-blotched lizard ===
The common side-blotched lizard (Uta stansburiana) is a species of side-blotched lizard common on the Pacific coast of North America, from Washington to western Texas and NW Mexico. It has a peculiar evolutionary strategy following the pattern of the game of rock, paper, scissors, with three types of males existing, each of which applies a different technique to acquire mates (Sinervo & Lively, 1996; Sinervo, 2001; Alonzo & Sinervo, 2001; Sinervo & Clobert, 2001; Sinervo & Zamudio, 2001). The specific epithet, stansburiana, is in honor of Captain Howard Stansbury of the United States Corps of Topographical Engineers, who collected the first specimens while leading the 1849-1851 expedition to explore and survey the Great Salt Lake of Utah. In Idaho, side-blotched lizards occur across the southwestern portion of the state.

=== Western whiptail ===
The western whiptail (Aspidoscelis tigris (Baird and Girard, 1852)) is a small lizard (adults average 25 to 35 cm - about a foot - in length) that ranges throughout most of the southwestern United States. Most of its populations appear stable, and is not listed as endangered in any of the states comprising its range. It lives in a wide variety of habitats, including deserts and semiarid shrublands, usually in areas with sparse vegetation; also woodland, open dry forest, and riparian growth. It lives in burrows. Major differences between this species and the checkered whiptail (Aspidoscelis tesselatus) include the lack of enlarged scales anterior to the gular fold and the presence of enlarged antebatrachial scales. It was previously known under Cnemidophorus tigris, until phylogenetic analyses concluded that the genus Cnemidophorus was polyphyletic. Since it does not migrate, a number of forms have developed in different regions, several of which have been given sub-specific names - for example the California Whiptail, Aspidoscelis tigris munda. In Idaho, western whiptails are found only in the southwestern section of the state.

=== Rubber boa ===
The rubber boa (Charina bottae) is a snake in the family Boidae and genus Charina. The family Boidae consists of the non-venomous snakes commonly called boas and consists of 43 species. The genus Charina consists of four species, three of which are found in North America, and one species found in Africa.

In Idaho, rubber boas can be found in a variety of habitats, ranging from desert shrub to open pine forest. Often, there is a water source nearby and rocks, woody debris or leaf litter that these snakes use for cover. Rubber Boas are found across the entire state.

=== Eastern racer ===
The eastern racer (Coluber constrictor) is a species of non-venomous, colubrid snakes. They are primarily found throughout the United States, east of the Rocky Mountains, but they range north into Canada, and south into Mexico, Guatemala and Belize. Racers typically grow to around 3½ foot (107 cm) long, but some subspecies are capable of attaining lengths of 6 feet (1.8 metres). Their patterns vary widely between subspecies. Most are solid colored as their common names imply, black racers, brown racers, blue racers or green racers. Runner is sometimes used instead of racer in their common name.

In Idaho, the eastern racer is found across most of the state but are not found in the northernmost portion of the state.

=== Ringneck snake ===
The ringneck snake or ring-necked snake (Diadophis punctatus) is a colubrid snake species. It is found throughout much of the United States, central Mexico, and south eastern Canada. Ring-necked snakes are secretive, nocturnal snakes that are rarely seen during the day time. They are slightly venomous but their non-aggressive nature and small rear-facing fangs pose little threat to humans who wish to handle them. They are best known for their unique defense posture of curling up their tails exposing their bright red-orange posterior, ventral surface when threatened. Ring-necked snakes are believed to be fairly abundant throughout most of their range though no scientific evaluation supports this theory. In Idaho, ringneck snakes are found in three isolated populations in the northwest, southwest and southeast portions of the state.

=== Night snake ===
The night snake (Hypsiglena torquata) is a species of rear-fanged, colubrid snake. They are found through the south and western United States, as well as Mexico. The number of subspecies varies depending on the source, but it is generally accepted that there are 17. The night snake has been found as far north as southern British Columbia, and as far south as Guerrero, Mexico. The Eastern range of the night snake extends to Texas. Still, not much is known as far as population densities and exact range due to the highly cryptic nature of the night snake. In Idaho, night snakes are found in the southern portion of the state, and northward along the Snake River to Lewiston, Idaho.

=== Striped whipsnake ===
The striped whipsnake (Masticophis taeniatus) is a species of nonvenomous colubrid snake that is closely related to the California whipsnake (Masticophis lateralis). It is native to the western United States and northern Mexico. The striped whipsnake is found all throughout the western United States and northern Mexico. The farthest north part of their range is in south central Washington and moves south into the great basin between the Cascade-Sierran crest and the continental divide. The range then continues southeast across the continental divide into New Mexico and western and central Texas. The farthest south part of the range lies in Michoacan, Mexico. In the Western United States the range also extends outside of the great basin into the Rogue River Valley in South Western Oregon and Northern California. In Idaho, striped whipsnakes are found in the southwest and south-central portions of the state.

=== Gophersnake ===
The gopher snake, (Pituophis catenifer) is a harmless colubrid species found in North America. Six subspecies are currently recognized, including the nominate subspecies described here. The specific name catenifer is Latin for 'chain bearing', referring to the dorsal color pattern. They can be found in a variety of habitats ranging from desert shrub lands to low mountain areas. Like the racer, gopher snakes are also frequently found in agricultural areas, utilizing the abundant prey available. In Idaho, gopher snakes can be found in appropriate habitat across most of the state, with the exception of the northern portion.

=== Longnose snake ===
The long-nosed snake (Rhinocheilus lecontei) is a species of nonvenomous colubrid snake. It is the only species in the genus Rhinocheilus, but has four recognized subspecies. Its specific name commemorates John Eatton Le Conte (1818-1891). Long-nosed snakes inhabit dry, often rocky, grassland areas of northern Mexico from San Luis Potosí to Chihuahua, and into the southwestern United States, in California, Nevada, Utah, Idaho, Arizona, New Mexico, Colorado, Kansas, and Texas. In Idaho, longnose snakes are found in the southwestern desert regions of the state and they may also occur south of Burley, Idaho.

=== Ground snake ===
The western ground snake (Sonora semiannulata) is a species of small, harmless colubrid snake. It is sometimes referred to as the variable ground snake as its patterning and coloration can vary widely, even within the same geographic region. It is native to the southwestern United States, in Texas, New Mexico, Arizona, Oklahoma, Colorado, Kansas, Missouri, Utah and California, as well as northern Mexico, in Sonora, Chihuahua, Coahuila, Nuevo León, and Durango. In Idaho, western ground snakes are found in the southwestern portion of the state, along the Snake River and surrounding drainages.

=== Common garter snake ===
The common garter snake, (Thamnophis sirtalis) is a snake indigenous to North America. Most garter snakes have a pattern of yellow stripes on a brown background and their average length is about 1 to 1.5 metres (3.3 to 4.9 ft). The common garter snake is a diurnal snake. In summer, it is most active in the morning and late afternoon; in cooler seasons or climates, it restricts its activity to the warm afternoons. In Idaho, the common garter snake is widely distributed in north, north central and southeast Idaho.

=== Terrestrial garter snake ===
The terrestrial garter snake (Thamnophis elegans) is a species of colubrid snake residing only in southwestern Canada, and the western United States. Seven subspecies are currently recognized. Most snakes have a yellow, light orange, or white dorsal stripe, accompanied by two stripes on its side of the same color. Some varieties have red or black spots between the dorsal stripe and the side stripes. This snake often inhabits coniferous forests, and is relatively aquatic. In Idaho, terrestrial garter snakes can be found statewide.

=== (Northern) Pacific rattlesnake ===
The northern Pacific rattlesnake inhabits southern and western regions of the state. The Great Basin rattler is a subspecies found in southern parts of the state.

=== Prairie rattlesnake ===
The prairie rattlesnake (Crotalus viridis) is a venomous pitviper species native to the western United States, southwestern Canada, and northern Mexico. In Idaho, prairie rattlesnakes are found in all but the northern portion of the state, and at high elevations.

=== Western painted turtle ===
The painted turtle (Chrysemys picta) is the most widespread native turtle of North America. It lives in slow-moving fresh waters, from southern Canada to Louisiana and northern Mexico, and from the Atlantic to the Pacific. The turtle is the only species of the genus Chrysemys, which is part of the pond turtle family, Emydidae.

In Idaho, painted turtles can be found in the northern portion of the state, and have been reported in western Idaho in waters associated with the Payette and Boise Rivers, and in eastern Idaho near St. Anthony.

== See also ==
- Birds of Idaho
- Mammals of Idaho
