= List of Idaho state prisons =

This is a list of state prisons in Idaho. There are no federal prisons in Idaho and this list does not include county jails located in the state of Idaho.

The state contracted with the Corrections Corporation of America to operate the Idaho Correctional Institution - Orofino until the state took back operations in January 2014. CCA also operates the largest prison in the state, the Idaho Correctional Center, although Idaho Governor Butch Otter announced in January 2014 that its contract would not be renewed.

Idaho also houses state prisoners at Core Civic's Saguaro Correctional Center in Eloy, AZ.

== Community Work Centers ==
- East Boise Community Reentry Center
- Idaho Falls Community Reentry Center
- Nampa Community Reentry Center
- South Idaho Correctional Institution Community Reentry Center

== Prisons ==
- Mountain View Transformation Center (formerly the Correctional Alternative Placement Program) (432 resident capacity)
- Idaho State Correctional Center
- Idaho Maximum Security Institution (402 resident capacity)
- Idaho State Correctional Institution
- South Boise Women's Correctional Center (284 resident capacity)
- South Idaho Correctional Institution (656 resident capacity)
- North Idaho Correctional Institution (414 resident capacity)
- Idaho Correctional Institution - Orofino (541 resident capacity)
- Pocatello Women's Correctional Cent (289 resident capacity)
- St. Anthony Work Camp (402 resident capacity)
