= List of museums in Idaho =

This list of museums in Idaho contains museums which are defined for this context as institutions (including nonprofit organizations, government entities, and private businesses) that collect and care for objects of cultural, artistic, scientific, or historical interest and make their collections or related exhibits available for public viewing. Museums that exist only in cyberspace (i.e., virtual museums) are not included.

== Museums ==
Name	Town/city	County	Region	Type	Summary
Appaloosa Museum	Moscow	Latah	North Central	History	website, history of the Appaloosa horse and its region of origin
Art Museum of Eastern Idaho	Idaho Falls	Bonneville	Southeast	Art	website, includes five galleries
Bannock County Historical Museum	Pocatello	Bannock	Eastern	Local history	website
Basque Museum & Cultural Center	Boise	Ada	Southwest	Ethnic - Basque-American	website, Basque history and culture in Idaho
Bellevue Historical Society	Bellevue	Blaine	Central	Local history	
Bingham County Historical Museum	Blackfoot	Bingham	Southeast	History	website, operated by the Bingham County Historical Society
Bird Aviation Museum and Invention Center	Sagle	Bonner	Northern	Aviation	Historic aircraft, aviation and inventions
Blaine County Historical Museum	Hailey	Blaine	Central	Local history	website
Boise Art Museum	Boise	Ada	Southwest	Art	Focuses on 20th-century American art with an emphasis on artists of the Northwest, American Realism and ceramics
Boise Basin Museum	Idaho City	Boise	Southwest	Local history	website, operated by the Idaho City Historical Foundation
Boise State University Vertebrate Museum	Boise	Ada	Southwest	Natural history	Teaching collection of preserved specimens of birds, mammals, reptiles, amphibians and fish, not open to the public
Bonner County History Museum	Sandpoint	Bonner	Northern	Local history	website, operated by the Bonner County Historical Society, exhibits include pioneers, farming, logging, mining, the Kalispell and Kootenai people
Boundary County History Museum	Bonners Ferry	Boundary	Northern	Local history	website, operated by the Boundary County Historical Society
Cambridge Museum	Cambridge	Washington	Southwest	Local history	
Camp Tosobia and Camp Mead DUP Historical Museum	Soda Springs	Caribou	Eastern	Local history	Operated by the Daughters of Utah Pioneers
Canyon Crossroads Transportation Museum	Melba	Canyon	Southwest	Multiple	Operated by the County in Celebration Park, currently under construction, exhibits on area natural history, Native Americans, transportation
Captain John Mullan Museum	Mullan	Shoshone	Northern	Local history	website
Cassia County Historical Museum	Burley	Cassia	South Central	Local history	Operated by the Cassia County Historical Society
Chesterfield Townsite	Chesterfield	Caribou	Eastern	Open air	Late 19th-century ghost town
Clayton Area Historical Museum	Clayton	Custer	Central	Local history	Operated by the Clayton Area Historical Association
Clearwater Historical Museum	Orofina	Clearwater	North Central	Local history	website
Collectors' Corner Museum	Idaho Falls	Bonneville	Southeast	Toy / collectibles	Includes dolls, bears, antiques, trains, coins, stamps and military memorabilia
Council Valley Museum	Council	Adam	Southwest	Local history	
Crane House Museum	Harrison	Kootenai	Northern	Local history	Operated by the Crane Historical Society
Crystal Gold Mine	Kellogg	Shoshone	Northern	Industry - mining	website, guided underground tour
Discovery Center of Idaho	Boise	Ada	Southwest	Science	Interactive exhibits designed to inspire a lifelong interest and learning in science, technology, engineering and math
Eagle Historical Museum	Eagle	Ada	Southwest	Local history	
Elk River Museum	Elk River	Clearwater	North Central	History	
Experimental Breeder Reactor I	Hailey	Butte	Central	Science	Decommissioned nuclear research reactor
Farragut State Park	Athol	Kootenai	Northern	Military	Includes the Brig Museum with displays about Farragut Naval Training Station
Fort Hall	Pocatello	Bannock	Eastern	Military	Replica mid-19th-century trading post
Franklin Idaho Relic Hall	Franklin	Franklin	Eastern	Local history	Operated by the Idaho State Historical Society
Gem County Historical Village Museum	Emmett	Gem	Southwest	Local history	website, operated by the Gem County Historical Society, displays include Native Americans, trappers, miners, settlers, agriculture, period room and business displays, early 20th-century period house, blacksmith shop
Glenns Ferry Historical Museum	Glenns Ferry	Elmore	Southwest	Local history	Located in an early 20th-century schoolhouse
Gooding County Museum	Gooding	Gooding	South Central	Local history	Operated by the Gooding County Historical Society
Hagerman Fossil Beds National Monument	Hagerman	Gooding	South Central	Natural history	Fossils of horses and tours of the fossil beds
Hagerman Valley Historical Society Museum	Hagerman	Gooding	South Central	Local history	website, area fossils, Native American, explorers, pioneers
Heritage Hall Museum	Dubois	Clark	Southeast	Local history	Located in a former Episcopal church
Herrett Center for Arts and Science	Twin Falls	Twin Falls	South Central	Multiple	Website, part of the College of Southern Idaho, exhibits Native American artifacts, natural history, planetarium with gallery and observatory, contemporary art gallery, student art
Historic P&IN Depot	New Meadows	Adam	Southwest	Local history	Operated by the Adams County Historical Society, restored Pacific & Idaho Northern depot, changing exhibits of local and state history and culture
Historical Museum at St. Gertrude	Cottonwood	Idaho	North Central	Local history	website, heritage of the Monastery of St. Gertrude, exhibits include the Benedictine Sisters, the Nez Perce people, fossils and minerals, Polly Bemis, medical artifacts, Asian and European artifacts dating to the 14th century, area immigrants, pioneer life
Hughes Home Museum	St. Maries	Benewah	Northern	Local history	Located in an early 20th-century log house
Idaho Black History Museum	Boise	Ada	Southwest	African American	History and culture of African Americans, with special emphasis on African Americans in Idaho
Idaho Heritage Museum	Twin Falls	Twin Falls	South Central	Multiple	Website, Native American artifacts, mounted game animals in their natural habitat, mounted birds, fossils, guns, coins
Idaho Military History Museum	Boise	Ada	Southwest	Military	website State military history, including all branches of the service, Mountain Home Air Force Base, Gowen Field, and all the wars in which Idahoans have served from the Spanish–American War onwards.
Idaho Museum of Mining & Geology	Boise	Ada	Southwest	Industry - mining / science - geology	website, mining artifacts, rocks and mineral specimens, state geology and mining history
Idaho Museum of Natural History	Pocatello	Bannock	Eastern	Natural history	Idaho’s geology, fossils, Ice-age megafauna, native culture, plants and animals
Idaho Potato Museum	Blackfoot	Bingham	Southeast	Food - Potato	Potato farming, food culture
Idaho State Historical Museum	Boise	Ada	Southwest	History	Operated by the Idaho State Historical Society, state history, culture, occupations and experiences
J. Howard Bradbury Memorial Logging Museum	Pierce	Clearwater	North Central	Industry - Timber	Local mining and logging history
Jefferson County Historical Museum	Rigby	Jefferson	Southeast	Local history	Also called the Farnsworth TV & Pioneer Museum, pre-electric and early electric era, the history of Jefferson County, early photography, Philo Farnsworth, operated by the Jefferson County Historical Society
Jerome County Historical Museum	Jerome	Jerome	South Central	Local history	website, operated by the Jerome County Historical Society, also operates the nearby Idaho Farm & Ranch Museum
Kamiah Valley Museum	Kamiah	Lewis	North Central	Local history	
Kootenai County Jail Museum	Rathdrum	Kootenai	Northern	Local history	Owned and operated by the Rathdrum/Westwood Historical Society, located in the former sheriff’s office and county jail, website
Kuna History Center	Kuna	Ada	Southwest	Local history	Operated by the Kuna Historical Society
Lawson's Emu-Z-um	Grand View	Owyhee	Southwest	Local history	website, includes pioneer and settler artifacts, period clothing, antique kitchen gadgets, early vehicles, frontier farming and ranching implements, mining equipment, Native American artifacts
Legacy Flight Museum	Rexburg	Madison	Southeast	Aerospace	website, restored military aircraft
Lemhi County Historical Museum	Salmon	Lemhi	Central	Local history	website, includes Lemhi Shoshone, ranching, mining, pioneer, and Chinese displays, archives of Lewis and Clark, operated by the Lemhi County Historical Society
Lewis-Clark State College Center for Arts & History	Lewiston	Nez Perce	North Central	Art	Part of Lewis–Clark State College, changing exhibits of art and local history
Lochsa Historical Ranger Station Museum	Kooskia	Idaho	North Central	History	website, operated by the US Forest Service in Nez Perce National Forest
McConnell Mansion Museum	Moscow	Latah	North Central	Historic house	website, operated by the Latah County Historical Society, features historic rooms interpreted in different time periods from 1900 to the 1930s
Minidoka County Historical Society Museum	Rupert	Minidoka	South Central	Local history	
MK Nature Center	Boise	Ada	Southwest	Natural history	website, operated by the state, also known as the Morrison Knudsen Nature Center
Mountain Home Museum	Mountain Home	Elmore	Southwest	Local history	website, operated by the Mountain Home Historical Society
Mud Lake Museum	Terreton	Jefferson	Southeast	Local history	Operated by the Mud Lake Historical Society
Museum of Clean	Pocatello	Bannock	Eastern	Technology	website, history of cleaning devices, includes vacuums, washers, brooms, toilets, tubs, cleaning products
Museum of Idaho	Idaho Falls	Bonneville	Southeast	Multiple	website, state and local history, culture, natural history, nuclear energy, Native Americans
Museum of North Idaho	Coeur d'Alene	Kootenai	Northern	History	website, exhibits include logging, agriculture, steamboats, railroads, recreation, the Coeur d'Alene Tribe
Museum of Winchester History	Winchester	Lewis	North Central	Local history	
Nampa Train Depot Museum	Nampa	Canyon	Southwest	Local history	website, operated by the Canyon County Historical Society, exhibits include area railroad history, antique dolls, rodeo, mustache cups
National Oregon/California Trail Center	Montpelier	Bear Lake	Eastern	History	website, features simulated wagon train experience of the 1850s, includes the Rails & Trails Museum about area history, railroads, pioneers
Nez Perce County Historical Museum	Lewiston	Nez Perce	North Central	Local history	Website, operated by the Nez Perce County Historical Society
Nez Perce National Historical Park	Spalding	Nez Perce	North Central	Ethnic - Native American	Spalding Visitor Center has a museum of the Nez Perce; Nez Perce National Historical Park has 38 sites spread over four states (Idaho, Montana, Oregon and Washington) with sites related to the Nez Perce
North Custer Museum	Challis	Custer	Central	Local history	
Northern Pacific Depot Railroad Museum	Wallace	Shoshone	Northern	Railroad	website, area railroad and mining history, located in an early 20th-century depot
Oakley Valley Historical Museum	Oakley	Cassia	South Central	Local history	Operated by the Oakley Historical Society
Oasis Bordello Museum	Wallace	Shoshone	Northern	Industry - prostitution	Local brothels
Old Fort Boise	Parma	Canyon	Southwest	Military	Reconstructed replica of Fort Boise, operated by the Old Fort Boise Historical Society
Old Idaho Penitentiary	Boise	Ada	Southwest	Prison	Operated by the Idaho State Historical Society, includes J. Curtis Earl Arms Collection of historic arms and military memorabilia
Old Mission State Park	Cataldo	Shoshone	Northern	Native American	Historic tribal mission for the Coeur d'Alene Tribe
Oneida County Pioneer Museum	Malad	Oneida	Eastern	Local history	
Orma J. Smith Museum of Natural History	Caldwell	Canyon	Southwest	Natural history	Part of College of Idaho, open on Friday afternoons and on the first Saturday of each month
Our Memories Indian Creek Museum	Caldwell	Canyon	Southwest	Local history	website, operated by the Canyon County Historical Society, includes period room displays
Owyhee County Historical Society Museum and Library	Murphy	Owyhee	Southwest	Local history	website
Palouse Discovery Science Center	Moscow	Latah	North Central	Science	website, hands-on science and learning experiences
Pappy Boyington Veterans Museum	Hayden	Kootenai	Northern	Aviation	, Registered 501c3, local aviation and military aviation history, includes artifacts of aviator Pappy Boyington and related Baa Baa Black Sheep television series "Stories From The Museum" . Retelling the lost stories of veterans.
Paris Historical Museum	Paris	Bear Lake	Eastern	Local history	
Payette County Museum	Payette	Payette	Southwest	Local history	website, operated by the Payette County Historical Society
Post Falls Historical Society Museum	Post Falls	Kootenai	Northern	Local history	
Power County Museum	American Falls	Power	Eastern	Local history	Operated by the Power County Historical Society
Priest Lake Museum	Coolin	Boundary	Northern	Local history	website, exhibits on area Native Americans, pioneers, early businesses, history of the US Forest Service
Priest River Museum and Timber Education Center	Priest River	Bonner	Northern	Industry - Timber	Exhibits on pioneer life, timber industry, located in the late 19th-century Keyser homestead house
Rock Creek Station and Stricker Homesite	Twin Falls	Twin Falls	South Central	History	Operated by the Idaho State Historical Society, includes the mid-19th-century house, store, pioneer cemetery and outbuildings
Roseberry General Store and Museum	Donnelly	Valley	Southwest	History	website, early 20th-century general store with historic displays and current merchandise
Sacajawea Interpretive, Cultural and Education Center	Salmon	Lemhi	Central	Biography	website, focuses on Sacajawea, her people the Agaidika, and the Lewis and Clark expedition
Shoshone-Bannock Tribal Museum	Fort Hall	Bannock	Eastern	Ethnic - Native American	Culture and art of the Shoshone people
Shoshone County Mining & Smelting Museum	Kellogg	Shoshone	Northern	Industry - mining	website, also known as Staff House Museum, exhibits on mining, smelting and cultural history of North Idaho's Silver Valley, located in the former Bunker Hill Staff house
Shoshone Indian Ice Caves and Museum	Shoshone	Lincoln	South Central	Ethnic - Native American / geology	Lava ice cave and museum with Native American artifacts, minerals and gems
Sierra Silver Mine Tour	Wallace	Shoshone	Northern	Industry - mining	website, tours of an underground silver mine
Soda Springs Historical Museum	Soda Springs	Caribou	Eastern	Local history	Located in the 1919 Ender's Hotel
South Bannock County Historical Center Museum	Lava Hot Springs	Bannock	Eastern	Local history	website
Spragpole Museum	Mullan	Shoshone	Northern	Local history	Area mining history, logging, late 19th-century period room and business displays
Stanley Historical Museum	Stanley	Custer	Central	Local history	Operated by the Sawtooth Interpretive & Historical Association in historic Valley Creek Ranger Station in Sawtooth National Recreation Area
Sun Valley Center for the Arts	Ketchum	Blaine	Central	Art	Also operates in Hailey, Idaho, contemporary and historical art by artists from around the world
Wood River Museum of History and Culture	Ketchum	Blaine	Central	Local history	Operated by The Community Library, exhibits include Hemingway and Sun Valley.
Teton Flood Museum	Rexburg	Madison	Southeast	Local history	Website, operated by the Rexburgh Historical Society
Teton Valley Museum	Driggs	Teton	Southeast	Local history	
Twin Falls County Historical Society Museum	Twin Falls	Twin Falls	South Central	Local history	website, exhibits include, Oregon Trail migration, ranching, irrigated-farming, early 1900s life. In the old Union School building, offers outbuildings and perimeter displays.
Valley County Museum	Donnelly	Valley	Southwest	Open air	website, also known as Historic Roseberry, operated by the Long Valley Preservation Society, includes the John Korvola Homestead
Wallace District Mining Museum	Wallace	Shoshone	Northern	Industry - mining	website, features artifacts and model of the Sunshine Mine, area mining heritage
Warhawk Air Museum	Nampa	Canyon	Southwest	Aerospace	website, historic military aircraft, military aviation history and artifacts
Weippe Discovery Center	Weippe	Clearwater	North Central	History	website, library, museum and community center, exhibits about Lewis and Clark
Weippe Hilltop Heritage Museum	Weippe	Clearwater	North Central	Local history	
Weiser Museum	Weiser	Washington	Southwest	Local history	Displays include Intermountain Institute, agriculture, Native Americans, mining, local automotive history, military
White Spring Ranch Museum	Genesee	Latah	North Central	Historic house	website, late 19th-century farmhouse, c.1876 Log cabin, c.1880 Curio Museum cabin
Wilford Woodruff Home	Randolph	Bear Lake	Eastern	Local history	Pioneer relics of early Mormon pioneer leader Wilford Woodruff
World Sports Humanitarian Hall of Fame	Boise	Ada	Southwest	Hall of fame - sports	Located on the campus of Boise State University, humanitarian contributions of athletes

== Defunct museums ==
- Hess Heritage Museum, Ashton
- Ketchum Sun Valley Historical Society Heritage & Ski Museum, Ketchum, collections now part of the Wood River Museum of History and Culture
- Sacajawea Museum at Spalding, former museum near the site of the Spalding Mission whose contents were sold off after a flood in 1963; featured a buckskin dress from Sacajawea, various Nez Perce Chief headdresses including two from the young Chief Joseph, and a dugout canoe from the Lewis and Clark expedition

== Regions ==
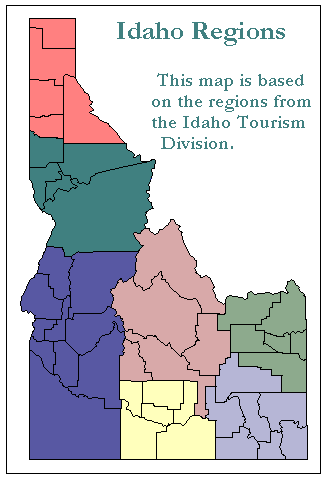

The Idaho Department of Commerce tourism division has divided the state into these seven regions which are used in the table above:

- Northern - Counties: Benewah, Bonner, Boundary, Kootenai, and Shoshone,
- North Central - Counties: Clearwater, Idaho, Latah, Lewis, and Nez Perce
- Southwest - Counties: Ada, Adams, Boise, Canyon, Elmore, Gem, Owyhee, Payette, Valley, and Washington
- Central - Counties: Blaine, Butte, Camas, Custer, and Lemhi
- South Central - Counties: Cassia, Gooding, Jerome, Lincoln, Minidoka, and Twin Falls
- East - Counties: Bingham, Bonneville, Clark, Fremont, Jefferson, Madison, and Teton
- Southeastern - Counties: Bannock, Bear Lake, Caribou, Franklin, Oneida, and Power

== See also ==
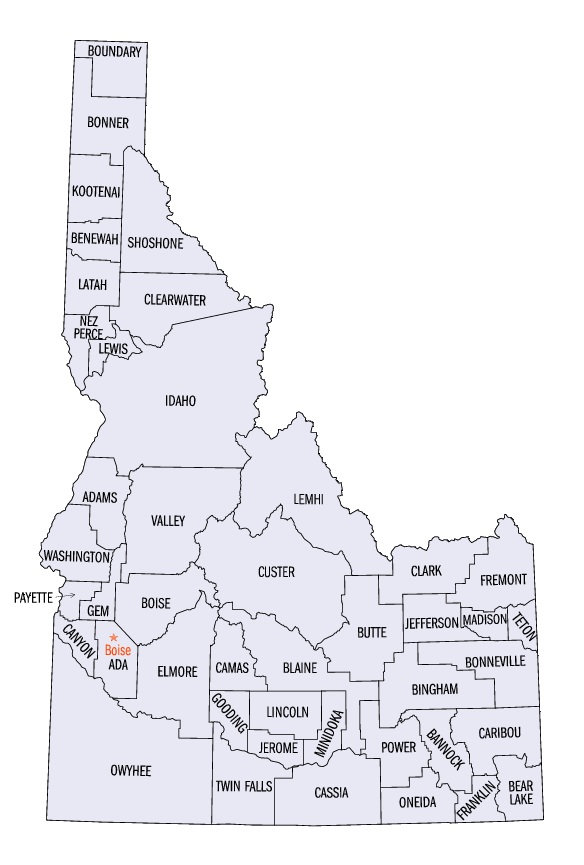
Idaho counties

- List of historical societies in Idaho
- List of nature centers in Idaho
