= 2026 in Idaho =

- Decades: 2000s; 2010s; 2020s
- See also: History of Idaho; Historical outline of Idaho; List of years in Idaho; 2026 in the United States

The following is a list of events of the year 2026 in Idaho.

== Incumbents ==
=== State government ===
- Governor: Brad Little (R)

== Events ==
- February 18 – A suspect steals an ambulance from an emergency center and drives it into a nearby Department of Homeland Security office in Meridian, before attempting to set the office on fire. A woman is arrested and charged about a week later.
- March 10 – The Idaho House of Representatives votes 44–26, for a resolution that calls for the US Supreme Court to reconsider its 2015 Obergefell v. Hodges same sex marriage decision. Second year in a row that a similar resolution would pass in the house.
- March 13 – The Joint Legislative Oversight Committee orders an investigation into sexual assault at women's prisons in Idaho.
- March 18 – Nampa Mayor Rick Hogaboam, who had been sworn in on January 5, dies after suffering a medical emergency at a town hall in Eagle.
- May 17 – Two jets collide during an air show at the Mountain Home Air Force Base. The four crew members of the planes safely eject and parachute to the ground.
- August 1 – Three people are killed and seven injured in a mass shooting at an In-N-Out Burger restaurant in Twin Falls. The gunman kills himself.
- November 3 – 2026 Idaho elections:
  - 2026 Idaho House of Representatives election
  - 2026 Idaho Senate election
  - 2026 United States Senate election in Idaho: Jim Risch wins reelection.
  - 2026 Idaho gubernatorial election: Brad Little wins reelection.
  - 2026 Idaho lieutenant gubernatorial election
  - 2026 United States House of Representatives elections in Idaho

== See also ==
- 2026 in the United States
