= 2025 in Idaho =

- Decades: 2000s; 2010s; 2020s
- See also: History of Idaho; Historical outline of Idaho; List of years in Idaho; 2025 in the United States

The following is a list of events of the year 2025 in Idaho.

== Incumbents ==
=== State government ===
- Governor: Brad Little (R)

== Events ==
- January 27 – The Idaho House of Representatives votes for a resolution that calls for the Supreme Court to reconsider its 2015 Obergefell v. Hodges same sex marriage decision.
- February 6 – The Idaho House of Representatives passes by a majority vote of 58-11 a bill that would make firing squad the main method for executions.
- March 5 –
  - The Trump Administration drops a lawsuit previously filed by the Biden Administration that aimed to prevent Idaho from enforcing a ban on abortion.
  - The Idaho Senate passes a bill that would make firing squad the main method for executions, by a majority vote of 28–7.
- March 12 – Governor Brad Little signs a Bill, which officially made firing squad as the primary execution method in the state. Idaho became the first state with such a policy.
- March 17 – The Idaho House unanimously passes a bill to permit the death penalty for rape and sexual abuse of children younger than 12 years of age.
- March 25 – The College of Idaho Yotes win the 2025 NAIA men's basketball tournament, beating Oklahoma Wesleyan 93–65.
- March 27 – Governor Little formally signs the bill into law, and the Bill will become effective from July 1, 2025, onwards. This law could ultimately challenge the precedent of Kennedy v. Louisiana.
- April 5 – Police in Pocatello fatally shoot autistic 17-year-old Victor Perez in the front yard of a home. Body-camera footage shows the officers arrive, approach a fence surrounding the yard, and shoot Perez, who was holding a knife. Perez is hospitalized and is taken off life support on April 12. The shooting sparks protests in Pocatello.
- May 1 – A pickup truck and a tour van collide near Henrys Lake State Park, killing seven people.
- May 6 – In response to a state law that bans pride flags from being flown on public property, the city of Boise votes to designate the pride flag an official city flag. Boise Mayor Lauren McLean had been flying the pride flag outside Boise City Hall since the law was passed.
- June 29 – Three firefighters are shot while responding to an intentionally-set forest fire in Coeur d'Alene. Two of them are killed.
- June 30 – Brian Kohberger, charged with murdering four University of Idaho students at their Moscow apartment, pleads guilty to all charges.
- October 10 – Defense Secretary Pete Hegseth announces the government will allow Qatar to build an Air Force base at Mountain Home Air Force Base.
- October 19 – Four people are arrested by the FBI and 50–100 are detained by ICE during an operation at a horse racetrack in Wilder.
- December 26 — Three people are wounded in a shooting at Shoshone County Sheriff’s Office in Wallace and the suspected shooter is killed.

== Sports ==
- 2025 Big Sky Conference men's basketball tournament
- 2025 Big Sky Conference women's basketball tournament

== See also ==
- 2025 in the United States
