= 2022 in Idaho =

- Decades: 2000s; 2010s; 2020s
- See also: History of Idaho; Historical outline of Idaho; List of years in Idaho; 2022 in the United States

The following is a list of events of the year 2022 in Idaho.

== Incumbents ==
=== State government ===
- Governor: Brad Little (R)

== Events ==
- June 12 – At least 30 members of the American neo-fascist group Patriot Front are arrested for conspiracy to riot at a pride event in Coeur d'Alene.
- August 2 – In the first legal challenge to a state's abortion law since the Supreme Court's June decision to overturn Roe v. Wade, the Department of Justice (DOJ) files a lawsuit in a federal court against the state of Idaho to block a state law that the DOJ says imposes a "near-absolute ban" on abortion in Idaho.
- November 13 – 2022 University of Idaho killings: In Moscow, Idaho, United States, four University of Idaho students are found stabbed to death at a residence near the university's campus.
- December 30 – 2022 University of Idaho killings: In Pennsylvania, the alleged perpetrator of the mass stabbing of four University of Idaho students, 28-year-old Bryan Christopher Kohberger, is arrested by police in the Pocono Mountains.

== See also ==
- 2022 in the United States
