= 1890 in Idaho =

- Decades: 1870s; 1880s; 1890s; 1900s; 1910s
- See also: History of Idaho; Historical outline of Idaho; List of years in Idaho; 1890 in the United States

The following is a list of events of the year 1890 in Idaho.

== Incumbents ==
=== State government ===
- Governor: George L. Shoup (R) (July 3-December 18); N. B. Willey (R) (starting December 18)

== Events ==
- Davis v. Beason
- July 3 – The Idaho Territory is admitted to the union of the United States as the 43rd state.
- October 1 – 1890 Idaho gubernatorial election: George L. Shoup is elected as the first governor of Idaho.

== See also ==
- 2022 in the United States
