= 2023 in Idaho =

- Decades: 2000s; 2010s; 2020s
- See also: History of Idaho; Historical outline of Idaho; List of years in Idaho; 2023 in the United States

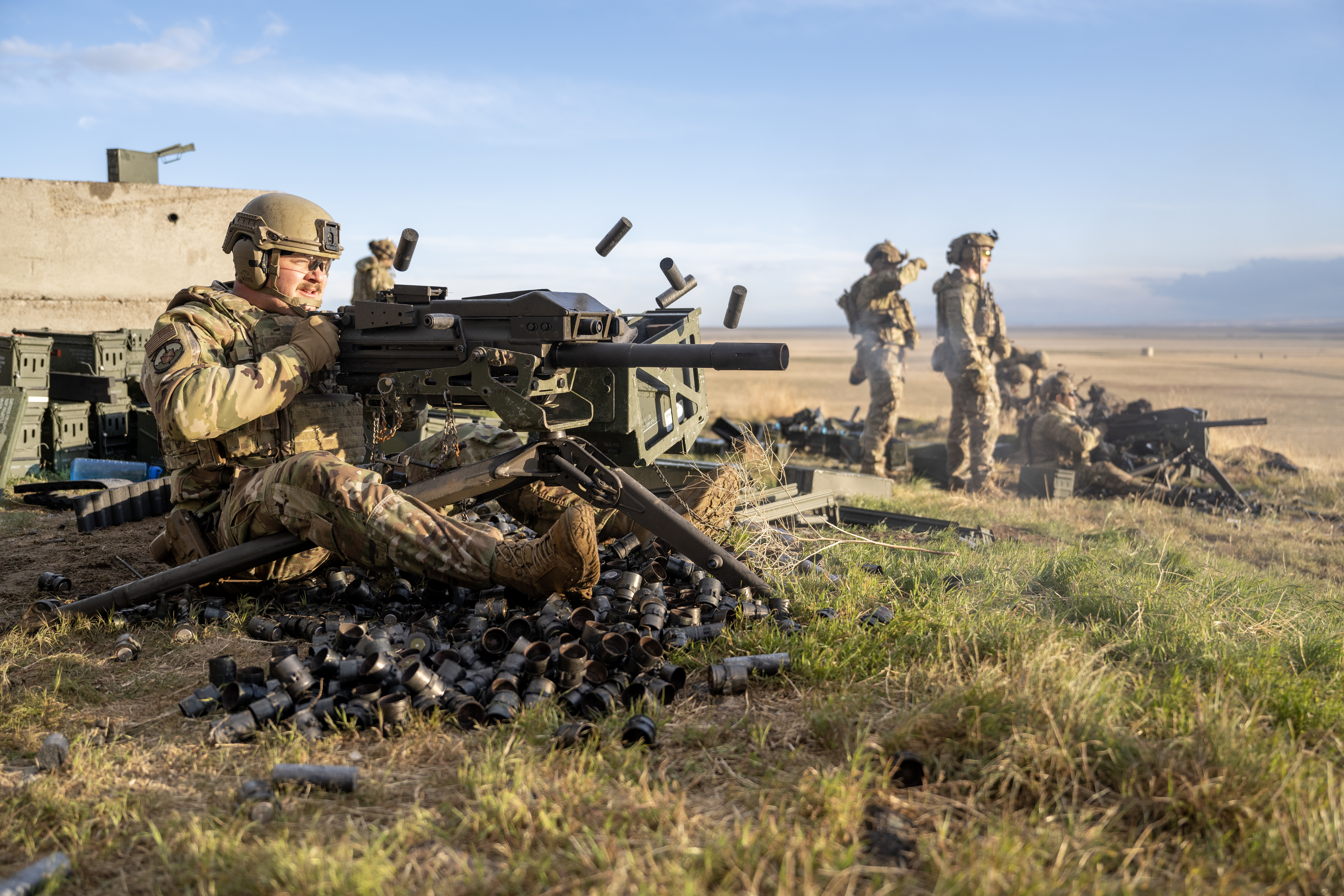
Tactical Air Control Party Airmen with the 124th Air Support Operations Squadron conduct proficiency training on a variety of vehicle, radio and weapons systems at Saylor Creek Air Force Range, Idaho, May 8, 2023.

The following is a list of events of the year 2023 in Idaho.

== Incumbents ==
=== State government ===
- Governor: Brad Little (R)

== Events ==
- The Circling Raven Championship is disestablished.
- November 7 – 2023 Boise mayoral election

== See also ==
- 2023 in the United States
