= List of killings by law enforcement officers in the United States, April 2025 =

This is a list of people reported killed by non-military law enforcement officers in the United States in April 2025, whether in the line of duty or not, and regardless of reason or method. The listing documents the occurrence of a death, making no implications regarding wrongdoing or justification on the part of the person killed or officer involved. Killings are arranged by date of the incident that caused death. Different death dates, if known, are noted in the description. The table below lists 100 people.

== April 2025 ==
Date	Name (age) of deceased	Race	Location	Description
2025-04-30	Tony Underwood	Black	Houston, Texas	Underwood fled a traffic stop conducted by HPD before crashing the vehicle. He then fled on foot, pulled out a gun and cock it. An officer later got into a struggle with Underwood when he tried to detain him. The officer shot him in response. Underwood succumbed to his injuries in July.
2025-04-30	Charles Mcgonegal (69)	White	Manteca, California	Mcgonegal was told to leave a fast food restaurant after he rammed a woman's car in the drive-thru. He then hit a patrol car when he was leaving and an officer fired a shot at him. A standoff then ensued that lasted for over 20 minutes and ended when he rammed two more patrol cars and was fatally shot by officers. The footage had been released.
2025-04-30	Justin Rhine (30)	Black	New Iberia, Louisiana	A New Iberia Police Officer fatally shot Rhine at an intersection. Police said Rhine pulled a gun on officers as they tried to detain him.
2025-04-30	Tyler Patterson (21)	White	Palm Shores, Florida	Patterson was fatally shot by a Brevard County Sheriff's Deputy at the front door of a house after Patterson reportedly lunged at the deputy with a knife.
2025-04-29	William Mohler (29)	White	Ashland, Kentucky	
2025-04-29	Michael Simpson (35)	White	Florence, Kentucky	
2025-04-29	James Andrew Parker (33)	Unknown	Mount Juliet, Tennessee	
2025-04-29	Jumaane Wright (28)	Black	New York City, New York	Police pulled over a Porsche on the Belt Parkway in East New York, Brooklyn after determining it was stolen from Pennsylvania. An officer shot and killed the driver, Wright, after the car nearly struck him. A passenger in the Porsche was arrested. The footage was released.
2025-04-28	Francisco Bazan	Unknown	Bexar County, Texas	A Bexar County Jail officer was arrested and charged with murder after reportedly helping inmates coordinate the deadly assault on Bazan inside the Bexar County jail. Four inmates were also charged with murder following Bazan's death.
2025-04-28	Shirley Estridge (81)	Unknown	Mount Gilead, Ohio	Estridge was killed in a crash involving an officer. Police said she failed to yield from the right of way from a stop sign before being struck by a cruiser.
2025-04-28	Alfred Lopez-Minor (31)	Hispanic	Oro Valley, Arizona	Police responded to reports of a shooting at a park and botanical garden and found a pick-up truck with its windows busted out. Lopez-Minor fired at officers with a handgun before an officer shot him. Lopez-Minor was a former park employee. The footage was released.
2025-04-28	Jerome Cooper (51)	Unknown	Philadelphia, Pennsylvania	
2025-04-28	Brian Montana (60)	White	South San Francisco, California	Police responding to a disturbance shot Montana after he fired at them and at a neighbor's residence. Montana was a former guitarist for the metal band Possessed. The footage was released.
2025-04-28	Jody Renee Cobia (37)	Hispanic	Casper, Wyoming	Two CPD officers responding to a reported burglary call at a home shot and killed Cobia, who was armed with a gun, after she pointed it at them. Cobia attempted to shoot the officers, but her gun jammed. Cobia was a resident of the home where the call took place. The footage was released.
2025-04-27	Eric Michael Watkins (54)	White	Justin, Texas	
2025-04-27	Derick P. Morgan (56)	Black	Marion, Indiana	
2025-04-26	Jerrius Davis (18)	Black	Myrtle Beach, South Carolina	Officers witnessed a disturbance and shot a man who began firing at a crowd with a handgun. The suspect was killed, and eleven other people sustained injuries. Myrtle Beach Police also stated that this incident related to a shooting in Laurinburg which injured two, involving the same group of juveniles. The dash cam footage was posted on Facebook by the department.
2025-04-26	Joseph Anthony Cassell (26)	White	Lake Ridge, Virginia	
2025-04-26	Brayan M. Orozco-Angulo (22)	Unknown	Greenwood, South Carolina	
2025-04-26	Alonzo Riser (20)	Black	West Palm Beach, Florida	Riser, who fatally stabbed his father, was shot dead by a Palm Beach deputy after refusing to drop a sword.
2025-04-26	James Blake Montgomery	White	Columbia County, Georgia	Columbia County deputies was serving a protective order on Montgomery, who was in an RV. When two deputies turned away, he opened fire on them, killing Deputy Brandon Sikes and severely injured Deputy Gavin White. Other deputies then returned fire. Montgomery was later found deceased in the RV after a pursuit, where pipe bombs and drug paraphernalia was discovered.
2025-04-26	Robert Aguilar Cholula (26)	Unknown	Ambler, Pennsylvania	
2025-04-25	Alexander Taylor (35)	White	Port Saint Lucie, Florida	Taylor, who had bipolar disorder and schizophrenia, got into an argument with his father over a ChatGPT chatbot called Juliet, which Taylor believed had been "killed" by OpenAI. Taylor's father called the police after Taylor punched him. Taylor grabbed a butcher knife, sat on his front porch, and wrote to ChatGPT that he was about to die. When officers arrived, Taylor charged at them, and police shot and killed him.
2025-04-25	unidentified male	Unknown	Houston, Texas	A suspect crashed his vehicle during a pursuit after fleeing a traffic stop for speeding. A Harris County patrol unit then struck and dragged the suspect to death when it lost control.
2025-04-25	John Snyder (37)	White	Lakeland, Florida	
2025-04-24	Ronald R Estes III (23)	White	Midlothian, Virginia	
2025-04-24	Damario Smith (25)	Black	Atlanta, Georgia	
2025-04-24	Abdullah Chetin (77)	Middle Eastern	Richland, Mississippi	Police pulled over Chetin in an RV and shot him after he allegedly fired at police. Chetin was a dissident journalist from Turkey who did not speak English. Chetin's son, who was present during the shooting, accused the Turkish government of causing the traffic stop by swatting Abdullah.
2025-04-23	Michael Landers (57)	Black	Dana, Indiana	
2025-04-23	Arvel Jones Sr. (51)	Black	Arbutus, Maryland	A plainclothes officer responded to a report of a man, Jones, who was armed with a bow and arrow. According to a witness, the officer pulled up next to Jones and shot at him at least five times after opening his car door.
2025-04-23	Jamal Wali (36)	Asian	Fairfax, Virginia	Wali refused to obey commands and shot 2 officers during a traffic stop. A third responding officer returned fire, killing him. Both officers survived their injuries. The footage was released.
2025-04-23	Vincent Morin (34)	White	Brandon, Florida	Morin, a man who was wearing tactical gear and carrying a rifle, was shot and killed by Hillsborough County deputies. He was an U.S. army veteran who served in Afghanistan and Iraq. The footage was released by police.
2025-04-22	Brady Lee Murray (46)	White	Decatur, Texas	DPD officers shot and killed a suspected Walmart thief who was fleeing.
2025-04-22	Tyren J. Kinloch (17)	Black	Charleston, South Carolina	Berkeley County deputies initiated a traffic stop on Kinloch, who was armed with an illegally modified handgun, during a shooting incident investigation. However, he exited the vehicle and fled. A deputy fatally shot him following a pursuit.
2025-04-21	unidentified male	Unknown	Cunard, West Virginia	
2025-04-21	Debra Lobbins (60)	Black	Deerfield Beach, Florida	A deputy responded to a reports a homeless woman was swinging two knives around. The officer shot and killed Lobbins outside a Walgreens after she allegedly approached him swinging a knife. Lobbins, who had a history of mental illness, had been reported missing by her family over a decade prior to her death.
2025-04-21	unidentified male	Unknown	Farmington, Utah	Farmington Police officers responded to a domestic disturbance call and found a man who was holding a pistol. The man did not follow commands before being fatally shot by one of the officers.
2025-04-21	Carlos Huitz (40)	Hispanic	Houston, Texas	Harris County deputies responded to a report of a man firing his gun outside an apartment balcony. Upon arrival, de-escalation efforts were attempted but unsuccessful. The gunman eventually fired his gun at police and was shot to death by SWAT team members. The footage was released by HCSO.
2025-04-20	Ahtume McCollum (36)	Black	Louisville, Kentucky	A man armed with a knife was reportedly yelling at neighbors and breaking windows at an apartment in Crescent Hill. When a LMPD officer attempted to detain him, a struggle ensued before he stabbed the officer on the bulletproof vest. The officer then shot him in the head, killing him. The footage was released.
2025-04-20	Jose Luis Naranjo-Cortez (46)	Hispanic	Fullerton, California	Fullerton Police officers attempted to restrain Naranjo-Cortez after seeing him smoldering a cardboard box. He became uncooperative and behaved erratically. He died after police gained control and put restraints on him. The footage was released.
2025-04-20	Aevon Bucknor Jr (44)	Black	Oxon Hill, Maryland	The footage was released.
2025-04-20	Johnathan Angel Flores (38)	Hispanic	Orlando, Florida	Detectives noticed a fight outside a restaurant in Downtown Orlando and saw Flores drop a gun and pick it up. Flores fired the gun into the air as they responded and then turn with the handgun moving in the direction of police, and officers shot and killed him. The footage was released.
2025-04-20	Yervand Serobyan (40)	Unknown	Los Angeles, California	
2025-04-20	Christifer Debus (34)	White	Columbia City, Indiana	
2025-04-20	Kevin Vallian (34)	Black	Baton Rouge, Louisiana	BRPD responded to a report of an armed man at a hotel before exchanging fire with him. The suspect, Vallian, was shot and killed.
2025-04-19	unidentified male	Unknown	Fayetteville, West Virginia	
2025-04-19	Carlos Enriquez (56)	Hispanic	Bonita, California	Chula Vista Police responded to a family disturbance call at a home. The subject of the call stepped out, and after a stand-off police shot him with a beanbag round. The man allegedly picked up a gun and pointed it at officers, and three officers fired their rifles at him.
2025-04-18	Wayne Volz (34)	White	Bartow, Florida	
2025-04-18	Rashan Jarvis Cofield (29)	Black	Atlanta, Georgia	
2025-04-17	Jameel Johnson (22)	Black	Dallas, Georgia	Paulding County deputies responded to a home for a welfare check. When they entered Johnson's room, his mother took away his rifle. Johnson then shot and injured a deputy with a handgun before being shot dead.
2025-04-17	Alexander Allinger (35)	White	Carson City, Nevada	
2025-04-17	Joshua Emanuel Pritchard (22)	Black	Bakersfield, California	
2025-04-17	Geoffrey Stirling (45)	White	Newport Beach, California	During a traffic stop, Stirling became uncooperative and took an officer's taser during the struggle, pointing it at the officer. The officer then shot and killed Stirling.
2025-04-16	Deshawn Patrick Jones (36)	Black	Nashville, Tennessee	A DEA agent shot a man to death during a narcotics operation outside a Midtown hotel.
2025-04-16	Danny Lee Cuelho (51)	Unknown	Anaheim, California	Anaheim Police responded to a shooting before chasing the suspect in a pickup truck on the freeway. They eventually performed three PIT maneuvers on the suspect's vehicle to terminate the pursuit. The driver who was armed refused to leave the truck before officers shot and killed him. The footage was released.
2025-04-16	Andre Dewayne Lamont Martin (46)	Black	Cleveland, Ohio	
2025-04-16	Alexandra Cordoba (54)	Hispanic	Gardena, California	
2025-04-15	John Scott Jr. (41)	Black	Decatur, Alabama	Police punched and Tasered Scott while he was experiencing a mental health crisis. He showed signs of medical distress about an hour after being taken to jail. He was taken to the hospital and was in a coma until he died on April 22, 2025.
2025-04-15	Vonderrick Rayford (51)	Black	Earlham, Iowa	Officers from multiple departments shot and killed Rayford, from Milwaukee, after he fired several shots at police during a traffic stop, according to police. Colorado Springs Police Department stated the suspect engaged in a shootout with them before fleeing to Iowa.
2025-04-14	Enrique Cortez Jr. (37)	Hispanic	San Diego, California	
2025-04-14	Kurtis Adam Simmons (31)	White	Hinton, Virginia	
2025-04-14	King Wong (60)	Asian	New York City, New York	Police in Astoria, Queens responded to reports of a man with a 14-inch-knife. Officers spoke to Wong for about a minute before using stun guns and shooting him. The footage was released.
2025-04-13	unidentified male	Unknown	Parker, Arizona	Parker PD and Colorado River Indian Tribe's Police responded to a call involving shooting victims. They encountered a suspect who was armed with a gun. He shot at officers before being killed by returned fire from both departments. FBI and Yuma Police are investigating.
2025-04-13	Kelly Allen Hudson (31)	White	Miami, Florida	
2025-04-12	Nancy Loftus (69)	Unknown	Deerpark, New York	State Police responded to a domestic incident where they found an injured man on the front porch. The man told the police that a woman inside stabbed him with a knife. The woman later came out, during which, she pointed a pellet gun at police. State troopers fatally shot her in response. The video released by Attorney General shows the fatal encounter.
2025-04-12	Eric Escobar (39)	Hispanic	Clermont, Florida	Lake County deputies responded to reports of a man yelling at passing vehicles and banging on an outside door of a home. Upon arrival, the man produced a handgun and one of the deputies shot him dead.
2025-04-11	unidentified male (43)	White	Lake Wales, Florida	A man told two people he wanted himself to be killed and asked for a gun. When the police arrived, he also told them he wanted to be killed and came toward them with a knife. A deputy then opened fire, killing him.
2025-04-10	Joanna Lopez (39)	Hispanic	Fresno, California	Lopez, a woman who held a knife to the back of a bystander's neck, was shot in the head by a responding FPD officer. She eventually died 8 days later. Police stated she expressed suicidal thoughts before the shooting.
2025-04-10	Darrick Lawrence (46)	White	Crystal Lake, Illinois	Officers responding to a domestic incident encountered an armed suspect, Lawrence, who allegedly barricaded himself in his home. During the standoff, Lawrence was shot and killed by police in unclear circumstances.
2025-04-10	Zachary Sisneros (32)	Unknown	Española, New Mexico	Sisneros was pursued to the parking lot of a Lowe's after he allegedly stole items from a home, including a firearm. He was fatally shot by officers after he reportedly exited his vehicle with a rifle.
2025-04-10	Brandon R. Moore (37)	Unknown	Malta, New York	Moore barricaded himself in his apartment after he encountered police responding to a domestic dispute. He was shot dead by officers after he reportedly pointed a handgun at police. The gun was later determined to be a BB gun.
2025-04-09	David M. Levine (69)	White	Malta, New York	At 1:43 p.m, the suspect David M. Levine was on the outside of the New York State Police Saratoga Barracks firing gun shots with a hunting rifle, police arrived and told Levine to put down his weapon multiple times. After refusing and then pointing the gun at police officers, NYSP officers shot multiple rounds at him, killing him.
2025-04-09	Antonio McMichaels (38)	Black	Gary, Indiana	McMichaels reportedly armed himself with a gun and took an adult man and a 1-year-old baby hostage. Police say he fired shots inside the apartment and at police, wounding the adult hostage. He was shot dead by police after allegedly exiting his residence holding the baby and pointing a gun at police.
2025-04-08	Michael Clarke (51)	White	Elizabeth City, North Carolina	Police responded to a call that a man entered the Sentara Albemarle Medical Center with a handgun. Three deputies fatally shot the man in the emergency triage room after he allegedly pointed the gun at them. A hospital security guard who had earlier attempted to subdue the man was treated for injuries.
2025-04-08	Marcos Cabrales (44)	Hispanic	Huntington Park, California	Police responded to reports of a man lighting a fire at a park. They encountered a man allegedly armed with a knife and shot him dead after he reportedly advanced towards them.
2025-04-07	Gregory Fitzgerald (41)	White	Garden Acres, California	San Joaquin County Sheriff's Office stated that Fitzgerald was stopped for suspicion of trash dumping. He exited his vehicle, shout at the deputy about that he had a gun and threatened to shoot the deputy, saying “I’m not going home, so one of you are not going home.” A chase ensued before he went on a roof. He ended up being fatally shot by police. Later police confirmed the object in his hand was not a gun and learned that he had an active warrant out of Missouri.
2025-04-07	Luis Montero Moncada (70)	Hispanic	Miami, Florida	Moncada was suspected of committing double homicide of a woman and a man before fleeing to an Extended Stay hotel, where he was shot dead by Miami-Dade County deputies after firing at them. The footage was released.
2025-04-06	Andrew Jackson Ecker (25)	White	Pottstown, Pennsylvania	Ecker shot a police officer who responded to a crash scene and fled. A barricaded situation ensued after police surrounded the house he was staying. Later that night, police shot and killed him.
2025-04-06	unidentified male	Unknown	Doniphan, Missouri	Ripley County Sheriff's Office responded to a report of a barricaded man and learned that he was armed with a knife. Few hours later, the man moved toward a trooper and a deputy with the knife and did not follow orders. They both opened fire, killing the man.
2025-04-06	Cameron Joel Cothern (27)	Unknown	Mason, Michigan	The suspect was walking in the wrong direction on U.S. 127. After 13 minutes of de-escalation efforts, he pulled out multiple knives and ran at Ingham County deputies before they fatally shot him.
2025-04-05	Victor Perez (17)	Hispanic	Pocatello, Idaho	Police responded to a call that Perez, who had autism and cerebral palsy, was armed with a knife. Bystander video showed officers arriving outside Perez's home, with Perez standing up behind a chain-link fence surrounding the yard. After Perez ignored orders to drop the knife and walked towards the police, officers shot him nine times. The shooting occurred about 12 seconds after officers arrived. Perez was sent to the hospital and was taken off life support on April 12.
2025-04-05	Isaac Christian Abril (43)	White	San Bernardino, California	Police responded to a call about a man threatening to kill his juvenile son. When they encountered the man, he refused to drop the knife and less-lethal options were ineffective. The officers fatally shot him when he tried to run back toward the home with the knife. Police released the footage in August 2026.
2025-04-05	Edenson Jules (31)	Unknown	Boynton Beach, Florida	Officers responded to a domestic dispute between a father and an adult son. Upon arrival, they encountered Jules, who armed himself with a machete. Jules charged at officers with the weapon before he was shot and killed.
2025-04-05	unidentified male	Unknown	Springville, Utah	SPD responded to a call of a woman screaming. When they came to investigate, a man exited the residence and stabbed one of the officers. Officers then fatally shot him.
2025-04-05	Bret Winn (29)	White	Puyallup, Washington	Police were dispatched to a multi-vehicle collision after receiving reports of an armed carjacking where they would receive another report of a second carjacking. The police would then pursue the suspect after finding that the suspect's description matched with both carjackings, the suspect would then approach officers with a weapon where the officers fatally shot the suspect.
2025-04-04	Jorge Meza (21)	Hispanic	Michigan City, Indiana	A MCPD officer fatally shot an armed man who fled during a traffic stop. Investigators stated that Meza pointed a gun at the officer multiple times and attempted to fire but it malfunctioned. A special prosecutor ruled it justified.
2025-04-04	Deshawn Leeth (30)	Black	North Sewickley Township, Pennsylvania	An altercation broke out after the suspect assaulted an Ohio State trooper. The suspect then stole a marked police vehicle and fled to Pennsylvania Turnpike. After a police chase, the suspect was fatally shot by troopers following another altercation. Video footage was released that shows Leeth assaulting the police officer multiple times, and saying, "Next time you touch me, you gonna die, next time you touch me, you gonna die."
2025-04-04	Kevin Garcia Gonzalez (20)	Hispanic	San Diego, California	San Diego Police responded to a report of a man pointing a gun at another person outside a church in Stockton neighborhood. Officers later located the suspect, Garcia Gonzalez, inside a blue car. During the confrontation, Gonzalez reached for a revolver before officers fired over two dozen shots at him, killing him. The shooting was captured by an eyewitness's cell phone.
2025-04-04	Robin Rae Budelli (41)	White	Tucson, Arizona	An altercation ensued after an Arizona DPS trooper tried to talk with a woman who was walking. During the struggle, the trooper shot and killed Budelli after she ran towards him with a knife.
2025-04-04	Tony G. Esker (47)	White	Prairie du Rocher, Illinois	Police responded to a call of a man with a gun threatening a woman. Monroe County deputies later shot and killed the suspect after negotiating with him for about 3 hours. They stated that the suspect pointed the gun at them and the taser was ineffective.
2025-04-04	Paige M. Newsum (57)	White	Vienna, Georgia	Turner County Sheriff's Office was assisting Cook County Sheriff's Office of a chase after a female driver fled a traffic stop for speeding. The chase later ended in Dooly County, where deputies performed PIT maneuver on the vehicle. The driver then fired at the deputies, injuring one. Deputies then returned fire, killing the woman.
2025-04-04	Bruce Boyd (54)	Black	Brentwood, New York	Officers responded to a welfare check at Boyd's home and were let in by his wife. Boyd, a former corrections officer, was found holding a knife and having two apparent self-inflicted wounds. Police shot and killed Boyd after he allegedly ran towards them with the knife.
2025-04-03	Erick Tom Watkins (48)	White	Bullhead City, Arizona	Bullhead City Police was assisting Las Vegas Police after two suspects stole a mail truck and a water taxi in Laughlin, Nevada. One of them, Watkins, ended up on the Arizona side of the river and fired at officers, prompting them to fire back, killing him. Another suspect is still on the run.
2025-04-03	unidentified male	Unknown	Porter, Oklahoma	Wagoner County deputies responded to a report of a man pointing a gun at a family member. A stand-off (barricade situation) later ensued. During which multiple gunshots were heard. Deputies shot him after he exited the residence. He was transported to a local hospital, where he died.
2025-04-03	unidentified male	White	Ogden, Utah	Police attempted to arrest a member of a white supremacist gang for a robbery several days prior. The man fled and fired at officers, who shot back and killed him. One officer was shot in the leg.
2025-04-03	Breighton Miller (27)	White	Big Timber, Montana	State troopers shot and killed Miller, wanted for planting a faulty bomb outside a prison in Tecumseh, Nebraska, after he reportedly fired at them.
2025-04-02	Jeremy Dean Barnett (45)	White	Guthrie, Oklahoma	Logan County deputies responded to a domestic violence call. Upon arrival, two deputies were shot by the suspect. The third deputy returned fire, killing him.
2025-04-02	Charles Briscoe (61)	Black	Louisville, Kentucky	Briscoe was killed in a collision with a Louisville police vehicle.
2025-04-02	Timothy Mark Jarvinen (58)	White	Mossy Head, Florida	Deputy William May responded to a disturbance at a Dollar General store. When he was escorting the suspect out, the suspect suddenly drew a gun and shot May multiple times. Deputy May managed to return fire, killing the suspect on scene. Deputy May was taken to hospital but he succumbed to his injuries a few hours later. Walton County Sheriff stated the shooting defies logic, since the deputy was not going to arrest the suspect.
2025-04-01	Kelsey Hildal (34)	White	Union Township, Clermont County, Ohio	Police shot and killed Hildal, who had reportedly been driving the wrong way on Interstate 275. Police radio indicates Hildal was carrying a gun when officers shot her.

== See also ==
- Death in custody § United States
- Henry A. Wallace Police Crime Public Database
- List of cases of police brutality
- List of countries with annual rates and counts for killings by law enforcement officers
- List of law enforcement officers killed in the line of duty in the United States
- List of law enforcement officers convicted for an on-duty killing in the United States
- List of shootings by US immigration agents
- List of police reforms related to the George Floyd protests
- List of unarmed African Americans killed by law enforcement officers in the United States
- Lists of killings by law enforcement officers
- Police brutality in the United States
- Police misconduct § United States
- Police riot § United States
- Police use of deadly force in the United States
