= Idaho State Historical Society =

State agency in Idaho, United States

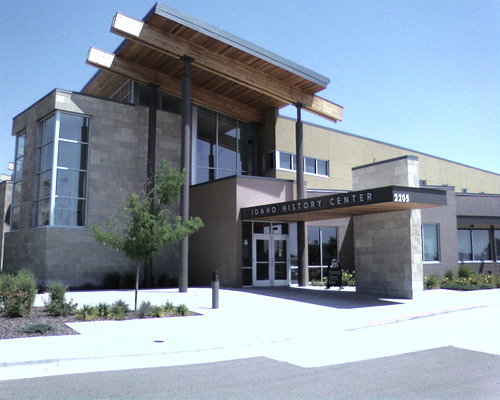
The Idaho History Center

The Idaho State Historical Society (ISHS) is a historical society located in the U.S. state of Idaho that preserves and promotes the state's cultural heritage.

The society was founded as the Historical Society of Idaho Pioneers in 1881, nine years before statehood in 1890, and was established as a state agency in 1907. Employing over 50 staff and over 100 volunteers; it includes the Idaho State Historical Museum, the official state museum; the Idaho State Archives, which provides public access to state archives, for which it is responsible, in addition to a variety of other reference material; the State Historic Preservation Office, which maintains records of historic places and archaeological sites in the state; and the Historic Sites Program, which oversees a number of historic sites including the Old Idaho State Penitentiary.

== History and organization ==
The ISHS was established in 1881, eighteen years after the Idaho Territory was established, and nine years before statehood in 1890. Initially named the Historical Society of Idaho Pioneers, its goal was to discover and preserve Idaho's heritage. Early efforts of the Historical Society led to the establishment of the Idaho State Historical Society as a state agency in 1907.

The ISHS is charged with responsibility of preserving Idaho's rich history and prehistory in accordance with Chapters 41 and 46 of Title 67 of the Idaho Code, and other statutory capacity assigned by Titles 14, 31, 33, 58, and 63. A board of trustees has statutory authority for setting policy for the society.

From its original "library and cabinet" meant to preserve "literary and scientific objects" the Society has evolved to include the Idaho State Historical Museum, the Public Archives and Research Library, the State Historic Preservation Office, the Historic Sites Program, and the Administration unit. The ISHS has a seven-member Board of Trustees appointed by the governor to represent Idaho's seven judicial districts. The Society now directly reaches more than 100,000 people annually and serves an additional 700,000 on its web site. http://www.history.idaho.gov

== Idaho State Historical Museum ==
The Idaho State Historical Museum, located in Idaho's capital city of Boise, is the official state historical museum. From its origin as a "cabinet of curiosities," the Idaho State Historical Museum has become the largest and most visited museum in the state. Its many interactive programs educate visitors in the historical value of its diverse and comprehensive collections. It is the official repository of artifacts relating to Idaho's and regional history.

The museum's collection is made up of over 250,000 objects. The collection includes a comprehensive permanent exhibit on Idaho's history, and exhibits on the state's varied cultures, occupations, and experiences. The museum also produces and hosts special temporary and traveling exhibits on a wide variety of historical and cultural subjects. The museum developed the J. Curtis Earl Exhibit at the Old Idaho State Penitentiary, featuring one of the nation's largest collections of historic arms and military memorabilia. The museum also developed and maintains the adjacent Pioneer Village, which includes some of the oldest buildings in Idaho: the Isaac Coston log cabin (1863), Thomas Logan adobe house (1865), and the Richard Adelmann house (1870-80s). Currently under construction in the village is the Lewis and Clark Discovery Trail, an outdoor, hands-on interpretive area focused on the scientific legacy of the Voyage of Discovery.

The Idaho State Historical Museum was one of the first western institutions, and the first in the state of Idaho, to be accredited by the American Alliance of Museums (AAM). The museum strictly follows the professional standards and procedures set by the AAM. It hosts over 30,000 visitors each year, including approximately 12,000 schoolchildren. It developed and maintains educational trunks and exhibits that travel to communities statewide. It also Provides statewide technical assistance to small museums and individuals.

== Public Archives and Research Library ==
The Idaho State Archives (ISA) provides public and scholarly access to a large collection of material relating to the history of Idaho and the Pacific Northwest. The collection is extremely varied in subject, geographic area, and time period. ISA is open to the public and serves over 12,000 on- and off-site researchers on an annual basis. The staff also provide technical assistance on records management issues to governmental agencies in Idaho and general workshops on research methodology and other topics for the public.

=== Public archives ===
On March 12, 1947, the Idaho Legislature enacted legislation assigning state archival authority to the ISHS (Idaho Session Laws, C.161'47, pp. 416–417). The Society was charged with establishing a unified state archive "in order to preserve and protect the historically important state, county, city, and village archives, and thus facilitate the use of Idaho records for official reference and historical research." The law further authorized and empowered custodians of records not in current use, but of historical significance to the state, or any county, city, or village, to deliver the records to the ISHS for permanent preservation. The law provided for the certification of such records by the ISHS and authorized the ISHS to require and supervise the collection of historically important archives. These powers and duties are captured in Idaho Code 67–4126. The archives has been part of PARL since 2006.

The archive serves as a focal point for public records management standards guidelines, procedures, and educational offerings covering:

- essential records protection
- file classification and maintenance
- electronic records management
- microfilm preparation and transfer
- non-current records storage and retrieval
- security storage of microfilm copies of essential records
- disaster preparedness and recovery information
- records retention and disposition
- archival records transfer procedures

=== Research Library ===
The Research Library provides access and reference, both in person and digitally, to any patron who submits a query. The collection is varied and comprehensive within its focus on the history of Idaho. The library's holdings cover a wide variety of mediums, including:

- an estimated 65,000 cubic feet (1,800 m^{3}) of manuscript and state archives material
- approximately 30,000 rolls of microfilm, including Idaho newspapers dating from 1863 to present
- approximately 500,000 photographic images (prints, negatives, slides, and transparencies)
- approximately 5,000 motion picture films and videos
- an extensive oral history collection with approximately 3,100 individual interviews (audio, video and digital formats)
- approximately 32,000 maps and architectural drawings
- an open-stack reference collection of approximately 25,000 book and periodical titles
- materials assembled by the library including: public archive records, vertical files (clipping files), in-house developed indexes, a reconstructed 1890 census, county records, Old Idaho State Penitentiary records, genealogical assistance, and microfilm access to many of Idaho's founding newspapers.

The Historical Society holds a collection of 3,000 negatives, scrapbooks and prints by Idaho photographer Everett L. "Shorty" Fuller (17 November 1906 - 10 August 2000). Fuller's photographs document street scenes, parades, and daily life in Boise during the 1930s and 1940s.

== State Historic Preservation Office ==
The Idaho State Historic Preservation Office (SHPO) was established in 1966 to lead historic preservation in the state. The Idaho SHPO undertakes a wide variety of statewide activities. Its responsibilities include managing the National Register of Historic Places program for the state. The SHPO also maintains Idaho's inventory of records for archaeological sites and historic buildings and structures. Currently, there are approximately 70,000 properties in the inventory.

The SHPO works with Federal and State agencies, cities, counties, and tribes to minimize the effects of development on historic properties and assists developers in obtaining Federal tax incentives for appropriate rehabilitation of historic buildings. It is responsible for planning preservation activities and cultural resource management. It is also responsible for overseeing the Archeological Survey of Idaho, including caring for its collections and conducting and overseeing archaeological investigations in Idaho.

== Historic Sites ==
The Historic Sites program oversees sites at Pierce, Franklin, Rock Creek, and Boise, including the National Historic Landmark Assay Office, where the State Historic Preservation Office is located. These sites give visitors the opportunity to immerse themselves in locations significant to Idaho's history. The Historic Sites managed by the ISHS include:

- Pierce Courthouse in Pierce, Idaho's oldest public building.
- Rock Creek Station and Stricker Homesite, located southeast of Twin Falls. A popular camping spot along the Oregon Trail, the area was the location of the first trading post between Boise and Fort Hall. It was the center of commerce in south central Idaho prior to the coming of the railroad.
- Franklin Historic Properties, including the Lorenzo Hill Hatch House, the Pioneer Relic Hall, the Franklin Cooperative Mercantile Institution, and the John Doney House in Franklin.
- The Old Idaho Penitentiary State Historic Site, the Assay Office, and the Bureau of Reclamation Building in Boise. The Old Idaho Penitentiary State Historic Site is the largest site managed by the ISHS and one of the largest National Register of Historic Places sites in Idaho. The society's primary focus at the site is interpreting the history of the site for visitors in an effort to encourage those visitors to become advocates for its preservation. Programs available at or relating to the site include:
  - self-guided tours of the Old Penitentiary to the general public
  - guided walks of the Old Penitentiary to the general public
  - interpretive programs of the Old Penitentiary for school/educational groups
  - interpretive exhibits located throughout the various prison buildings
  - interpretive video "Doing Time"
  - information about and resources regarding the Old Idaho Penitentiary on the internet including the Old Idaho Penitentiary Educational Resource Kit and Old Penitentiary Worksheets.

== Publications ==
Idaho Yesterdays was a peer-reviewed historical journal published by the ISHS. Initiated in 1957, the periodical was distributed to society members and focused on current historical and cultural research on Idaho and its region. In spring 2009 it became an electronic journal, with new issues published and archived online and access no longer requiring ISHS membership. Idaho Yesterdays ceased publication in 2013.

The ISHS also publishes a quarterly newsletter, Mountain Light, as well as books, pamphlets and other materials.

== Notable Artifacts ==
- Nampa figurine

== See also ==
- List of historical societies in Idaho
