= 2024 in Idaho =

- Decades: 2000s; 2010s; 2020s
- See also: History of Idaho; Historical outline of Idaho; List of years in Idaho; 2024 in the United States

The following is a list of events of the year 2024 in Idaho.

== Incumbents ==
=== State government ===
- Governor: Brad Little (R)

== Events ==
- January 31 – A hangar currently under construction collapses in Boise killing three people and injuring nine.
- February 13 – The Idaho House of Representatives votes 56-12 for a death penalty bill for defendants convicted of child rape. The bill could ultimately challenge the precedent of Kennedy v. Louisiana.
- March 2 – Republican Party caucuses are held in Idaho.
- March 18 – A death penalty bill for defendants convicted of child rape doesn't pass the Idaho Senate.
- May 21: Crook County, Oregon votes in favor of Measure 7–86 Greater Idaho movement. This makes it the 13th county in Oregon that has passed a similar ballot measure resulting in the majority of Counties in the proposed Greater Idaho map having voted in favor.
- June 1 – A jury in Idaho, sentences Chad Daybell to death for the murders of his ex-wife and two of his wife's children.
- June 27 – The US Supreme Court issues a ruling in Moyle v. United States, dismissing the case and reinstating the ability to perform exceptional emergency abortion care in Idaho, where a formal ban on abortion is in place.
- September 13 – Two people are presumed dead and at least two others are injured in an explosion and subsequent fire at a gas station in Clearwater County.

== See also ==
- 2024 in the United States
