= KBGH =

Television station in Filer–Twin Falls, Idaho (1999–2009)

Filer–Twin Falls, Idaho; United States
- City: Filer, Idaho
- Channels: Analog: 19 (UHF); Digital: 18 (UHF), never used

Programming
- Affiliations: Educational independent (1999–2009)

Ownership
- Owner: College of Southern Idaho

History
- Founded: November 3, 1992
- First air date: July 6, 1999
- Last air date: February 17, 2009; (9 years, 226 days)

Technical information
- Facility ID: 12284
- ERP: 75.9 kW (analog); 40 kW (digital CP)
- HAAT: 161 m (528 ft) (both)
- Transmitter coordinates: 42°43′47″N 114°24′55.6″W

KBGH (channel 19) was an independent non-commercial educational television station licensed to Filer, Idaho, United States, which served the Twin Falls area. The station's transmitter was located on Flat Top Butte near Jerome. Owned by the Twin Falls–based College of Southern Idaho (CSI), KBGH existed strictly as a means of providing telecourses and distance learning.

== History ==
An original construction permit for a full-service station was granted to CSI on November 3, 1992. The callsign KBGH was granted on May 14, 1993. Although it was to be a full-service station, its permit specified a low-power 75.9 kW ERP signal. The station commenced broadcasting on July 6, 1999.

KBGH was granted a construction permit to construct a digital television station on channel 18, on February 22, 2001. However, CSI had elected not to transition KBGH to a digital facility. On February 17, 2009, the original day of national digital transition, KBGH completely ceased operations. On March 31, 2009, the FCC officially deleted KBGH's callsign.

Since the shutdown, CSI has implemented a fully digital online telecommunication system, whereby students at distant sites can participate via the Internet.

Paradoxically, if CSI initially had applied for a license for a LPTV station instead of as a full-service station, it would have remained free to continue analog broadcasts after the original February 2009 deadline, though it would have been required to convert to digital or go off the air by July 13, 2021.

== Programming ==
CSI used KBGH solely as a means of delivering telecourses to students. When the station was not broadcasting a telecourse, it had no programming at all—only a blank picture was transmitted.
