= List of historical societies in Idaho =

The following is a list of historical societies in the state of Idaho, United States.

== Organizations ==
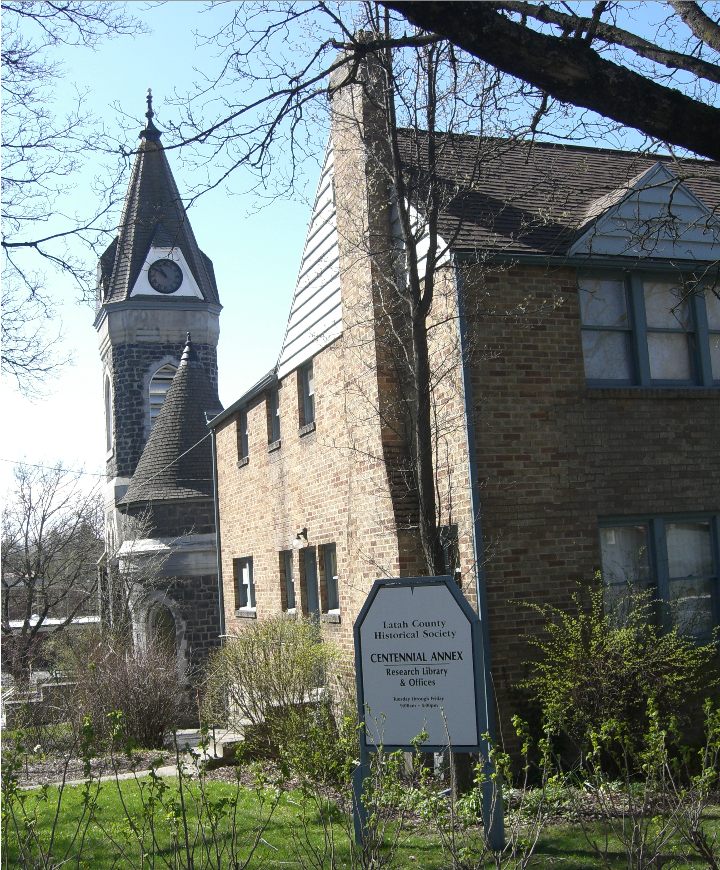
Latah County Historical Society offices and library building, Idaho (photo 2007)

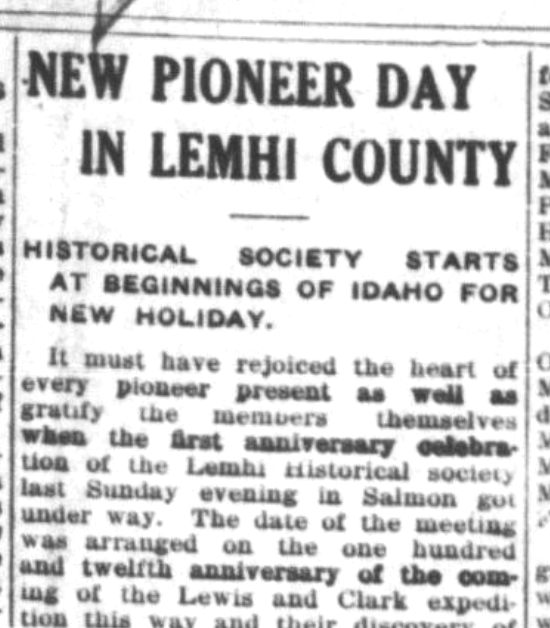
1917 newspaper item about the Lemhi County Historical Society, Idaho. The society began in 1916 and was re-established in 1956

- Atlanta Historical Society
- Bannock County Historical Society
- Bellevue Historical Society
- Bonner County Historical Society
- Bonners Ferry Historical Society
- Canyon County Historical Society
- Cassia County Historical Society
- Clearwater Historical Society, Orofino
- Dry Creek Historical Society
- Hagerman Valley Historical Society
- Idaho State Historical Society
- Ilo-Vollmer Historical Society
- Island Park Historical Society
- Latah County Historical Society
- Lemhi County Historical Society
- Lewis County Historical Society
- Lincoln County Historical Society
- Minidoka County Historical Society
- Mullan Historical Society
- Mud Lake Historical Society
- Nez Perce County Historical Society
- North Custer Historical Society
- Oakley Valley Historical Society
- Owyhee County Historical Society
- Parma Historical Society
- Post Falls Historical Society
- Potlatch Historical Society
- South Custer Historical Society
- Troy Historical Society
- Twin Falls Historical Society
- Upper Snake River Valley Historical Society

== See also ==
- History of Idaho
- List of museums in Idaho
- National Register of Historic Places listings in Idaho
- List of historical societies in the United States
