= John Wunder =

American historian of the Great Plains and Native American law (1945–2023)

John R. Wunder
- Born: John Remley Wunder; January 7, 1945; Vinton, Iowa, U.S.
- Died: June 25, 2023 (aged 78); Lincoln, Nebraska, U.S.
- Occupation: Historian
- Spouse: Susan Wunder
- Children: 2

Academic background
- Education: University of Iowa (BA, MA, JD); University of Washington (PhD, 1974)

Academic work
- Discipline: History
- Sub-discipline: Legal history · Native American history · Great Plains · Nebraska
- Institutions: Case Western Reserve University; Texas Tech University; Clemson University; University of Nebraska–Lincoln
- Notable works: Retained by the People: A History of American Indians and the Bill of Rights (1994)

John Remley Wunder (January 7, 1945 – June 25, 2023) was an American historian of the American West, the Great Plains, and Native American legal history. He was professor emeritus of history at the University of Nebraska–Lincoln, where he directed the Center for Great Plains Studies from 1988 to 1997, and served as president of the Western History Association in 2009–10.

Trained in both law and history, Wunder centered Native American sovereignty and law in his scholarship, treating Native nations as enduring legal and political entities. His book Retained by the People: A History of American Indians and the Bill of Rights received Phi Alpha Theta's award for the best history book of 1995.

== Early life and education ==
Wunder was born in Vinton, Iowa, and raised in nearby Dysart, Iowa. He earned his BA and MA in history and a JD from the University of Iowa, and completed his PhD in history at the University of Washington in 1974.

== Career ==
Wunder held faculty positions at Case Western Reserve University (1974–1978), Texas Tech University (1978–1984), where he also directed the Ethnic Studies Program from 1980 to 1982, and Clemson University (1984–1988), where he was professor of history and department head. He held visiting appointments at Lewis & Clark College and Columbia University.

In 1988 Wunder joined the University of Nebraska–Lincoln as professor of history and director of the Center for Great Plains Studies. During his directorship (1988–1997), he founded the interdisciplinary journal Great Plains Research, helped launch the Encyclopedia of the Great Plains, and expanded the Great Plains Art Museum. Drawing on his legal training, he assisted in defending Native burial rights and facilitating the repatriation of Indigenous cultural materials in Nebraska. At UNL he also served as associate dean of the College of Arts and Sciences (1990–1993) and as Hitchcock Lecturer of Journalism and Mass Communications (2006–2011).

Wunder was the first UNL professor selected to hold the Fulbright Bicentennial Chair in American Studies at the University of Helsinki. He served as president of the Western History Association (2009–10) and of the Mari Sandoz Heritage Society.

== Scholarship ==
Wunder authored or edited more than twenty books on subjects including the Great Plains, American legal history, Native American history, Nebraska, and the history of six-man football. His scholarship combined legal training with historical method, insisting on the standing of Native nations as legal and political actors in American history. Retained by the People: A History of American Indians and the Bill of Rights (1994) traced the relationship between American Indians and U.S. constitutional law and won Phi Alpha Theta's best book award.

== Legacy ==
In 2016 the Center for Great Plains Studies opened the Wunder Book Collection, comprising scholarly works about the Great Plains and Native peoples donated by Wunder. He also donated his law books to the UNL law library and his papers to the university archives. He received UNL's Annis Chaikin Sorensen Award for outstanding teaching in 1994 and the 2021 Sower Award in the Humanities from Humanities Nebraska for contributions to public understanding of the humanities.

Wunder died on June 25, 2023, in Lincoln, Nebraska, at age 78.

== Selected works ==
- Inferior Courts, Superior Justice: A History of the Justices of the Peace on the Northwest Frontier, 1853–1889 (Westport, CT: Greenwood Press, 1979) ISBN 9780313206207
- Retained by the People: A History of American Indians and the Bill of Rights (New York: Oxford University Press, 1994) ISBN 9780195055627
- Americans View Their Dust Bowl Experience, co-edited (Denver: University Press of Colorado, 1999) ISBN 9780870815072
