= Rock Creek Station and Stricker Homesite =

Historic house in Idaho, United States

- Stricker Store and Farm
- U.S. National Register of Historic Places
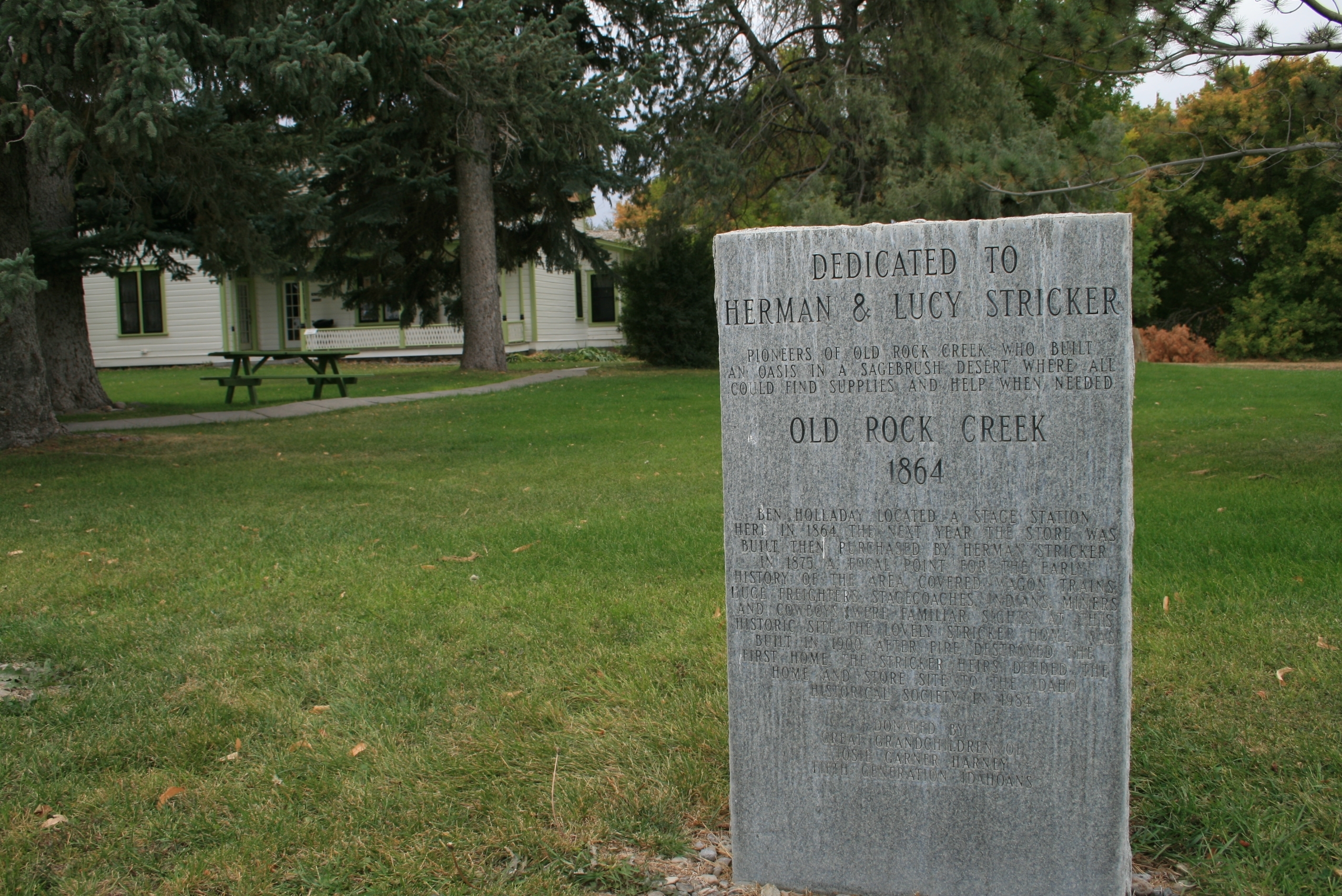

- Location within Idaho Location within the United States
- Location: N of Rock Creek, Twin Falls, Idaho
- Coordinates: 42°27′33″N 114°19′16″W
- Built: 1865
- Architect: James Bascom
- NRHP reference No.: 79000810
- Added to NRHP: August 30, 1979

Rock Creek Station and Stricker Homesite is a historical site operated by the Idaho State Historical Society. It includes the Stricker Store and Farm, which was listed on the National Register of Historic Places in 1979. Two previously important roadways (Oregon Trail and the Kelton Road) met at this site.

== History ==
At one time, the Rock Creek Station was the largest stage station between Fort Hall and Fort Boise. In 1864, Ben Holladay selected the site for a home station on his Overland Stage Line. In 1865, James Bascom built the Rock Creek Store. In 1876, Herman Stricker purchased the store and remained the proprietor until it closed in 1897.

Visitors can see the Rock Creek Store building, Stricker home, reconstructed summer house, and an interpretive center.
