= Killing of Victor Perez =

2025 police killing in Idaho

- Police moments before shooting Perez
- Date: Shooting: April 5, 2025 c. 5:10 p.m. (MDT); Death of Perez: April 12, 2025
- Location: Pocatello, Idaho, US
- Type: Shooting by law enforcement
- Filmed by: Perez's neighbor and two security cameras
- Participants: Pocatello Police Department officers
- Charges: None
- Litigation: Civil lawsuit filed by Perez's family

On April 5, 2025, 17-year-old Victor Perez, a nonverbal autistic boy with cerebral palsy, was shot and killed by four police officers in Pocatello, Idaho. Perez was taken to the Portneuf Medical Center for his injuries, where he died a week later on April 12 due to complications. On September 3, 2025, the Attorney General's Office stated that they would not file charges against the police officers; however, as of November 2025, Perez's family is proceeding with a federal civil rights lawsuit.

== Background ==
Victor Perez was a 17-year-old boy who was born with cerebral palsy and had nonverbal autism. His family described him as having the brain of a 5-year-old and that he "[could] hardly walk". The 911 call on April 5 was the third time since December 2024 that the police were dispatched to Perez's address, and in one of the incident reports, his mother stated that he "had a history of having violent outbursts".

== Shooting ==
On April 5, 2025, at 5:10 pm, a security camera captured several people struggling. They were later identified as Perez's grandfather, mother, and younger sister, who were struggling with him over a 9-inch kitchen knife. During this incident, Perez attempted to strike his grandfather with the knife, and his grandfather returned several hits both with his hands and a log. At 5:22pm, a neighbor called 911, "explaining that a man who appeared to be intoxicated was wielding a knife and trying to stab other people". The 911 operator dispatched four police officers who were not aware of Perez' disability. The neighbor who called 911 also recorded the events on her cellphone.

When the officers arrived, they gave verbal commands to Perez, and he did not comply. However, in response, he raised the knife and moved towards them at which point the officers shot him 12 times. Victor was behind a fence and stood up, not understanding why several men appeared outside of his yard. The officers then screamed briefly for a few seconds before shooting at him. There was no descalation and they arrived with guns in hand. This occurred sixteen seconds after the officers arrived. Victor Perez's leg had to be immediately amputated and was in critical condition. Perez died from his injuries on April 12.

== Investigation ==
The Eastern Idaho Critical Incident Task Force began investigating the shooting, and Idaho State Police said evidence would be turned over to an area prosecutor. On September 3, 2025, the Idaho Attorney General's Office stated that they would not file charges against the officers involved in the shooting. Deputy Attorney General Jeff Nye acknowledged the shooting was a tragedy, but argued that "The State would be unable to prove beyond a reasonable doubt that the four officers who discharged their weapons were not justified in using deadly force".

== Public response ==
A video was released by the neighbor who called 911. On Saturday, April 12, 2025, over 300 people attended the scheduled candlelight prayer vigil outside of the Portneuf Medical Center and then protested at City Hall.

== Civil lawsuit ==
In June 2025, the family filed a federal civil rights lawsuit, alleging excessive use of force as well as violations of the Fourth Amendment, Fourteenth Amendment and the Americans with Disabilities Act. On September 3, 2025, the attorney for the Perez family stated that they are moving forward with the civil lawsuit despite the Attorney General clearing the officers.

== See also ==
- List of killings by law enforcement officers in the United States, April 2025
