= Herrett Center for Arts and Science =

Museum in Idaho, USA

Coordinates: 42.5842°N 114.4704°W

- Established: 1980
- Location: College of Southern Idaho campus, 315 Falls Avenue, Twin Falls, Idaho, United States
- Director: Teri Fattig
- Website: http://herrett.csi.edu

The Herrett Center for Arts and Science, located on the main campus of the College of Southern Idaho in Twin Falls, Idaho, United States, is a museum of anthropology, natural history, astronomy, and art. The museum's collections primarily comprise anthropological artifacts and natural history specimens from the Americas, as well as works of local artists. The Center also houses the Faulkner Planetarium, the Centennial Observatory, a museum store, and a 2900 square foot (269 square meter) multi-purpose event space.

== Museum Galleries ==
The museum exhibits a variety of anthropological artifacts, ethnographic items, and natural history specimens, primarily from the Americas. Notable among them is the Simon Clovis cache of over thirty stone bifaces found in Idaho in 1961, and a replica of the Huntington Canyon Mammoth, a nearly-complete Columbian mammoth skeleton unearthed in Utah in 1988. The Jean B. King Gallery of Art offers several exhibits per year, including annual student and faculty exhibits.

== Planetarium ==
The Faulkner Planetarium opened in November, 1995, as the largest planetarium theater in Idaho, seating 151 under a 50' (15.2 m) dome (seven seats were later removed). When first opened the theater featured one of the first Evans & Sutherland Digistar II digital graphics projectors, 49 random access slide projectors, three video projectors, and an 11,500 W sound system. An upgrade to an Evans & Sutherland Digistar 5 fulldome video system, LED cove lighting, a Dolby 5.1 surround sound system and an AstroFX theater control system took place in the fall of 2013, followed by an upgrade to Digistar 6 in May 2020. Programs are offered for school groups and the public throughout the year.

== Observatory ==
The Centennial Observatory opened in May, 2004, featuring the largest fully wheelchair-accessible public telescope in the world at the time (since superseded). It houses a 24" (0.6 m) Ritchey-Chrétien f/8, computer-controlled, equatorial fork-mounted telescope manufactured by DFM Engineering under a 20' (6 m) dome, as well as a number of smaller portable telescopes. Viewing opportunities are offered throughout the year to both the public and school groups.

== Event Space: Rick Allen Room ==
This 50 x 58 foot multi-purpose room, with a view of the eastern part of the CSI campus, has a 25 x 45 foot patio on its South side for outdoor receptions or entertainment, and courtyard for events on the lawn. The maximum capacity of this room is 240 chairs arranged auditorium style or 176 chairs arranged for dining at twenty two 5-foot round tables. There is full A/V capabilities with 2 ceiling projectors, wall slides, microphones, etc. The space can also accommodate 144 with a classroom-style layout. A kitchenette is equipped with counter top, sink, refrigerator, microwave, and ice maker.

== History ==
The museum began in the 1950s from the avocations of Norman Herrett (1904-1979), owner/operator of a Twin Falls, Idaho jewelry store. Herrett's astronomical interests led him to construct a small building behind the store with an observatory on the roof and a home-built planetarium on the ground floor. He also built a room adjoining the store to exhibit the anthropological artifacts he collected on trips through the Americas, and later, the works of local artists. The Herrett Arts and Science Center, as it was known, featured an eclectic blend of exhibit styles, including a number of interactive displays with motorized action. The planetarium featured a variety of purpose-built projectors and special effects, and the observatory housed a 12.5" Newtonian and 10" Maksutov telescope. Local students were trained to present programs for school groups in the planetarium and museum. In 1972, Herrett forged an agreement with the fledgling College of Southern Idaho to transfer his collections to the College in exchange for the construction of a building on the campus to house them. The Herrett Center museum opened on the CSI campus in 1980, shortly after Herrett's death. The facility featured anthropology galleries and an art gallery. Expansions in 1995 and 2003-4 included additional gallery space, the Faulkner Planetarium, new artifact storage space, the Rick Allen multi-purpose room, and the Centennial Observatory.

== See also ==
- List of astronomical observatories
- List of astronomical societies
- List of planetariums
- Lists of telescopes
