= Brown's Creek CCC Camp Barracks =

- U.S. National Register of Historic Places
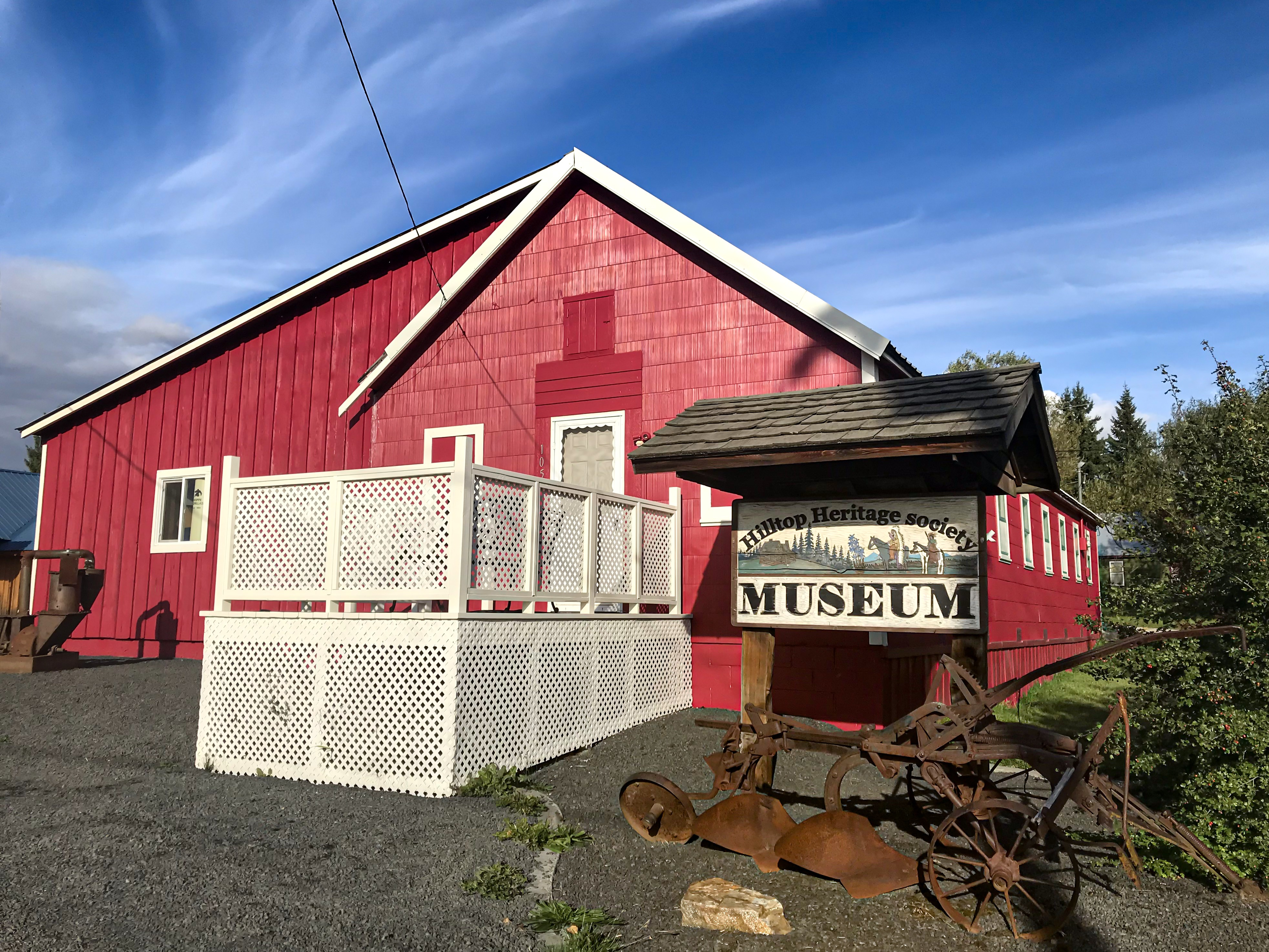

- Location within Idaho Location within the United States
- Location: 105 1st St., E., Weippe, Idaho
- Coordinates: 46°22′34″N 115°56′10″W
- Area: less than one acre
- Built: 1933
- NRHP reference No.: 84001114
- Added to NRHP: July 5, 1984

Brown's Creek CCC Camp Barracks in Weippe, Idaho was built in 1933 listed on the National Register of Historic Places in 1984.

It is a one-story frame building, "a standard-design Civilian Conservation Corps work center building."

After being relocated in 1947, it has served as Weippe Public Library. It now houses the Weippe Hilltop Heritage Museum.
