= College of Southern Idaho =

Public community college in Twin Falls, Idaho, US

Coordinates: 42.580°N 114.475°W

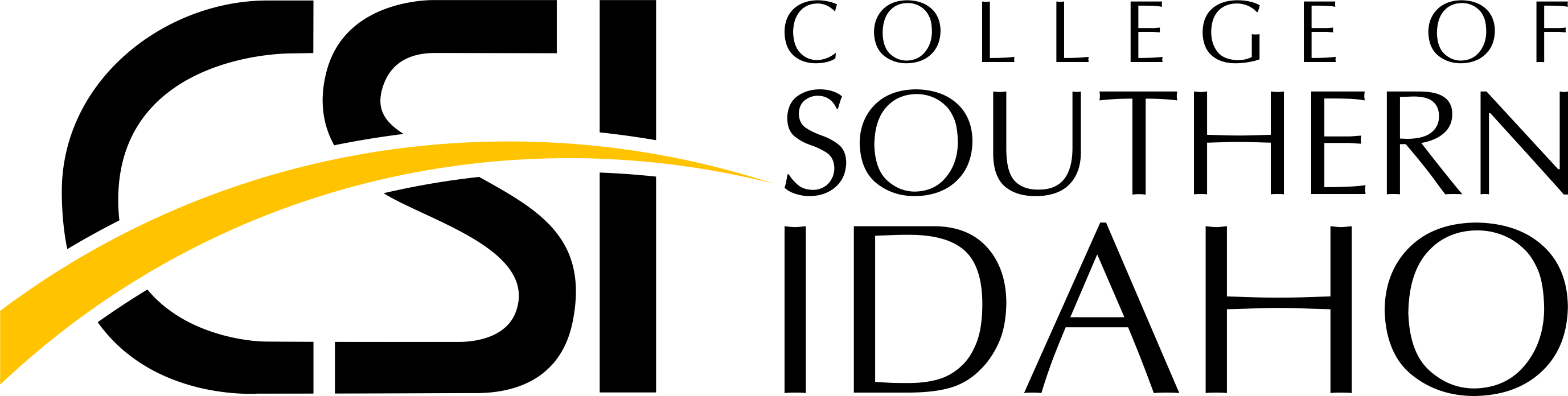
- Type: Public community college
- Established: 1965; 61 years ago
- Parent institution: Idaho State Board of Education
- Accreditation: NWCCU
- Academic affiliations: Space-grant
- President: L. Dean Fisher
- Administrative staff: 152
- Students: 8,775 (Fall 2023)
- Location: Twin Falls, Idaho, United States
- Campus: 300 acres (1.2 km^{2}); Remote town
- Other campuses: Burley; Gooding; Jerome
- Colors: Black and gold
- Nickname: Golden Eagles
- Sporting affiliations: NJCAA - SWAC
- Mascot: Gilbert the golden eagle
- Website: www.csi.edu

College of Southern Idaho (CSI) is a public community college in Twin Falls, Idaho. It also has off-campus programs in Jerome, Burley and Gooding. Together with the College of Eastern Idaho, College of Western Idaho and North Idaho College, CSI is one of only four comprehensive community colleges in Idaho.

College of Southern Idaho offers associate of arts, associate of science, associate of applied science degrees, and technical certificates in over 115 disciplines. Additional upper-division courses through the University of Idaho, Idaho State University, and Boise State University are also offered. CSI's enrollment is approximately 7,000 students with an additional 3,000 in non-credit courses. Approximately 85% of the student body is from Idaho's Magic Valley region. The college is governed by a five-member board of trustees elected at large by voters in Twin Falls and Jerome Counties.

== History ==
The region was originally served by the Southern Idaho College of Education (SICE) in Albion, which closed in 1951. Although proposals for a junior college in southern Idaho were made as early as 1952 and courses were offered at the short-lived Southern Idaho College in Buhl in the early 1960s, it wasn't until the Idaho Legislature passed and Governor Robert Smylie signed the Junior College Act in 1963 that the foundation of what became the College of Southern Idaho began in earnest. In November 1964, voters in Twin Falls County formed a junior college district under the provisions of the Junior College Act. Neighboring Jerome County joined the district in 1965. CSI held its first classes at Twin Falls High School later that year.

In 1967, a men's basketball program was founded at CSI by Eddie Sutton, who later became a prominent basketball coach at Kentucky and Oklahoma State. The CSI men's basketball team has consistently been a national contender at the community college level ever since. Home games routinely sell out season after season and rank as one of Twin Falls' main entertainment draws.

Since moving to its own campus 58 years ago in 1968, CSI has been one of the fastest-growing colleges in Idaho. It has also become a vital part of the Twin Falls area, both culturally and economically.

Major campus buildings are named for the college's first two presidents, James L. Taylor (1965–1982) and Gerald R. Meyerhoeffer (1983–2005).

== Catchment ==
Its catchment area includes all of the counties of Blaine, Camas, Cassia, Gooding, Jerome, Lincoln, Minidoka, and Twin Falls. It also includes portions of Elmore and Owyhee counties. Jerome and Twin Falls counties are in the college's taxation zone.

== Student life ==
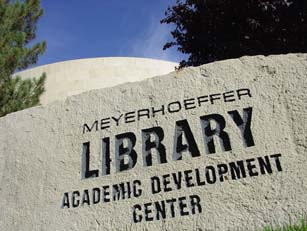
Meyerhoeffer Library at CSI

Most CSI students commute from off-campus. A single on-campus residence hall houses approximately 250 students. Approximately 58% of the student body is over the age of 21.

College and community activities are regularly held at the College of Southern Idaho Fine Arts Center, the Herrett Center for Arts and Science, and the Eldon Evans Expo Center. Frontier Field hosts a variety of community softball leagues during the summer months.

Student government is administered by the Associated Students of CSI which is controlled by a student senate elected from the student body. CSI sponsors approximately 50 student clubs and organizations.

== Athletics ==
The College of Southern Idaho Golden Eagles compete in Region 18 of the National Junior College Athletic Association (NJCAA). As of 2009 CSI has won a total of 11 NJCAA national championships, including titles in women's volleyball, men's basketball and men's baseball. The Golden Eagles rodeo team has won an additional three national championships in the National Intercollegiate Rodeo Association.

Founded by Eddie Sutton in 1966, CSI's men's basketball program is one of the most successful at the community college level, claiming to be the winningest junior college program in the United States. Between 1967 and 2007 CSI posted a total record of 1158–217, made 23 national tournament appearances and won the NJCAA national title three times. In that period the Golden Eagles have never had a losing season. The Golden Eagles' 137-game home winning streak between December 1984 and January 1992 is the longest for a men's basketball team at any level in collegiate sports.

Although CSI failed to make the NJCAA national tournament in 2007–08, the Golden Eagles continue to command a strong reputation nationally. CSI began the 2008–09 season ranked third in the nation in preseason polls. The Golden Eagles won their third NJCAA national championship in 2011.

The women's volleyball team was particularly dominant in the 1990s, winning a remarkable 190 consecutive matches between 1994 and 1997 and seven national titles in eight years between 1993 and 2000. The program won its NJCAA Division I record ninth national championship in 2009, breaking its tie with Miami Dade College. CSI won its 10th championship in 2012.

After reinstituting the Golden Eagle cross-country and track program in 2017, CSI Head Cross Country and Distance Track Coach Lindsey Anderson led the Golden Eagle women to a fourth-place finish and the men to a sixth-place finish at the NJCAA Division I Cross Country Championships in 2018. That year, she also coached the men's individual national champion. Her teams have consistently placed in the top ten throughout her time at CSI, with the men finishing second in the nation in 2020 and the women winning the NJCAA National Championship in 2021. Coach Anderson received several coach of the year awards by the U.S. Track & Field and Cross Country Coaches Association, most recently as the 2021 NJCAA Women's Division I Cross Country Coach of the Year.

== Notable alumni ==
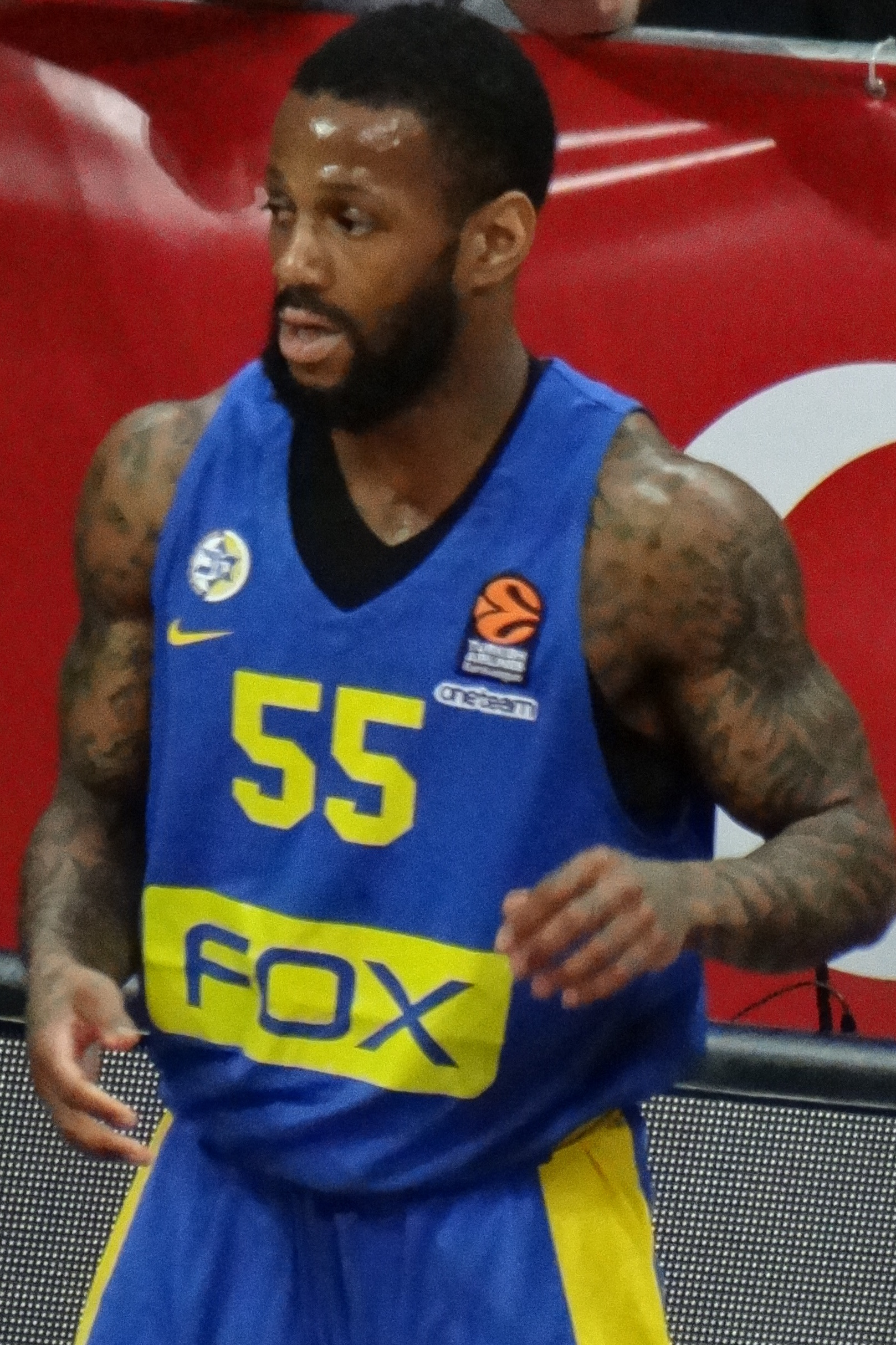
Pierre Jackson

- Deishuan Booker (born 1996), basketball player in the Israeli Basketball Premier League
- Pierre Jackson (born 1991), basketball player
- Artsiom Parakhouski (born 1987), Belarusian basketball player
- Adrian Royle, distance runner
- Bruce Skaug, member of the Idaho House of Representatives
- David Thirdkill, NBA basketball player; 1993 Israeli Basketball Premier League MVP

== See also ==
- KBGH (television station owned by CSI)
