= John Korvola Homestead =

- U.S. National Register of Historic Places
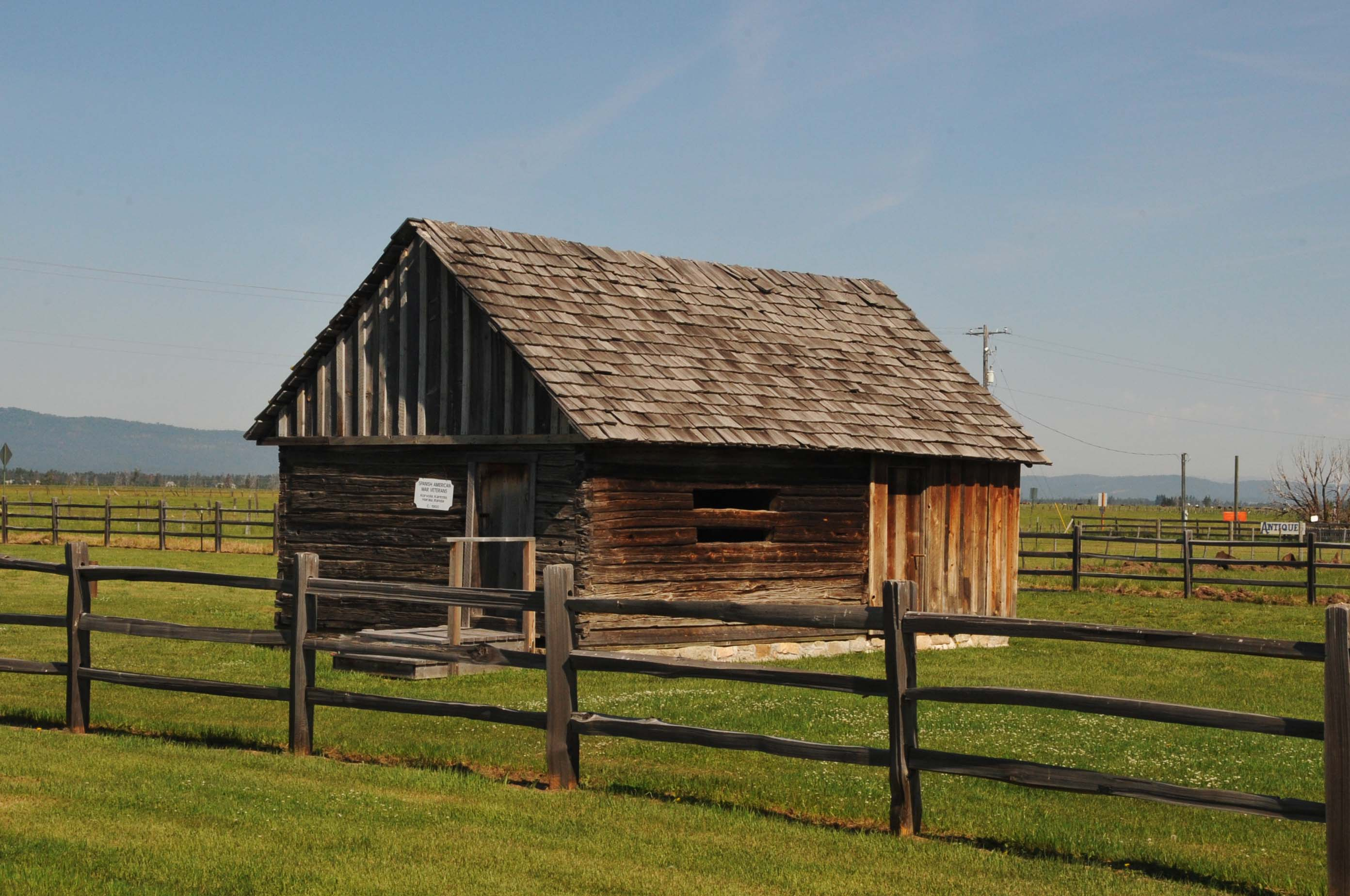

- Location within Idaho Location within the United States
- Location: Roseberry Rd. and Farm to Market Rd.
- Nearest city: Donnelly, Idaho
- Coordinates: 44°44′12″N 116°4′20″W
- Area: 2.5 acres (1.0 ha)
- Built: 1900
- Architectural style: Finnish Log Structure
- MPS: Long Valley Finnish Structures TR
- NRHP reference No.: 82000366
- Added to NRHP: November 17, 1982

John Korvola was one of four Finnish homesteaders who came to Roseberry in Valley County, Idaho after the Spanish–American War. The town flourished until it failed to get the railroad, which passed 1.5 miles to the west, instead.

The homestead was listed on the National Register of Historic Places in 1982. It was one of 13 buildings in the Long Valley area that were considered together for NRHP listing in 1982; all were built by Finns using traditional Finnish log construction.
