= History of Idaho =

The history of Idaho is an examination of the human history and social activity within the state of Idaho, one of the United States of America located in the Pacific Northwest area near the west coast of the United States and Canada. Other associated areas include southern Alaska, all of British Columbia, Washington, Oregon, western Montana and northern California and Nevada.

== Indigenous inhabitants ==
Humans may have been present in Idaho for 16,600 years. Recent findings in Cooper's Ferry along the Salmon River in western Idaho near the town of Cottonwood have unearthed stone tools and animal bone fragments in what may be the oldest evidence of humans in North America. Earlier excavations in 1959 at Wilson Butte Cave near Twin Falls revealed evidence of human activity, including arrowheads, that rank among the oldest dated artifacts in North America. Native American tribes predominant in the area in historic times included the Nez Perce and the Coeur d'Alene in the north; and the Northern and Western Shoshone and Bannock peoples in the south.

== European exploration ==
- Cataldo Mission
- U.S. National Register of Historic Places
- U.S. National Historic Landmark
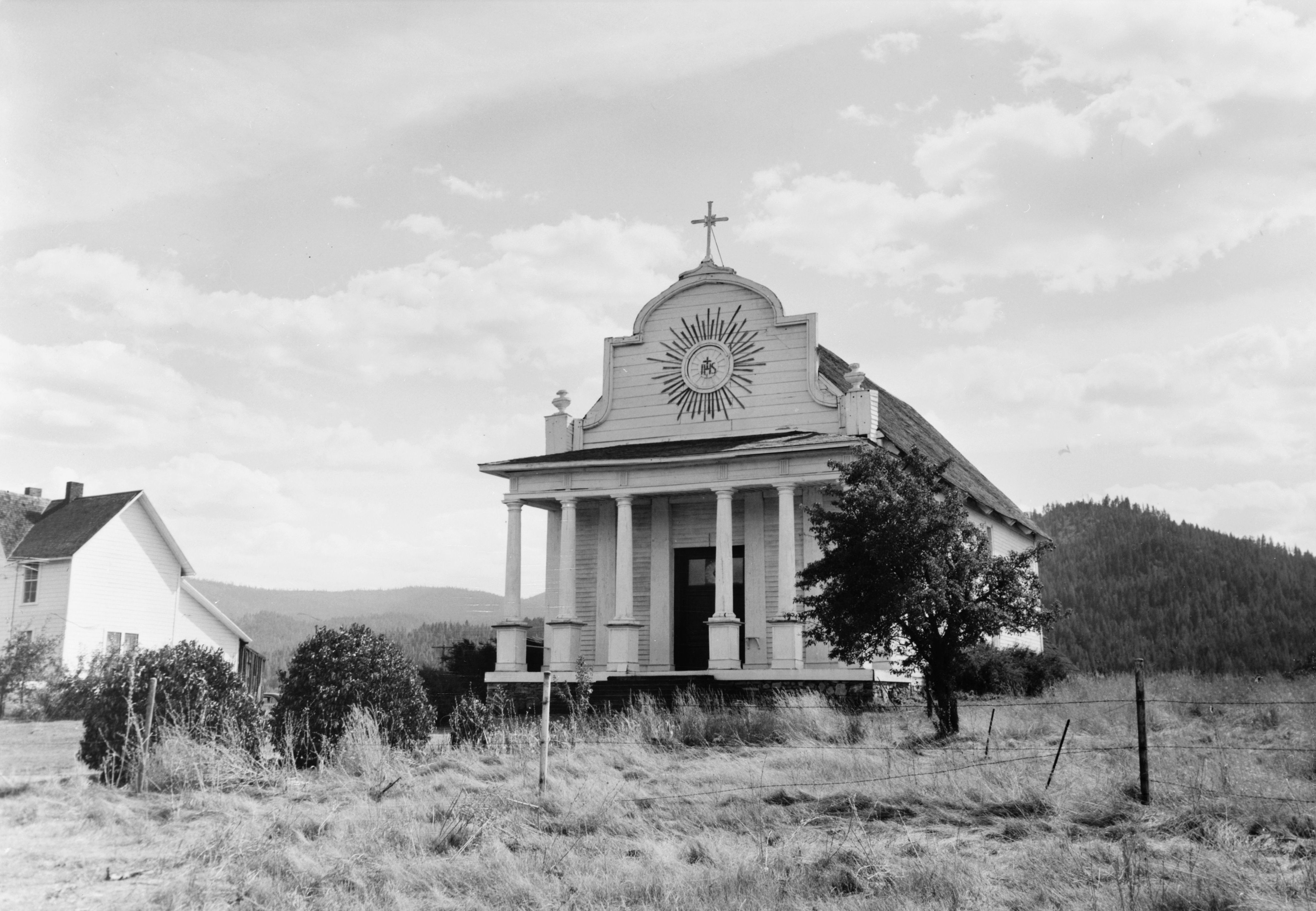
- HABS, view from northwest, in 1957
- Location: Cataldo, Idaho
- Built: 1848
- Architect: Antonio Ravalli
- Architectural style: Greek Revival, Colonial
- NRHP reference No.: 66000312

Significant dates
- Added to NRHP: October 15, 1966
- Designated NHL: July 4, 1961

Idaho was one of the last areas in the lower 48 states of the US to be explored by people of European descent. The Lewis and Clark expedition entered present-day Idaho on August 12, 1805, at Lemhi Pass. It is believed that the first "European descent" expedition to enter southern Idaho was by a group led in 1811 and 1812 by Wilson Price Hunt, which navigated the Snake River while attempting to blaze an all-water trail westward from St. Louis, Missouri, to Astoria, Oregon. At that time, approximately 8,000 Native Americans lived in the region.

Fur trading led to the first significant incursion of Europeans in the region. Andrew Henry of the Missouri Fur Company first entered the Snake River plateau in 1810. He built Fort Henry on Henry's Fork on the upper Snake River, near modern St. Anthony, Idaho. However, this first American fur post west of the Rocky Mountains was abandoned the following spring.

The British-owned Hudson's Bay Company next entered Idaho and controlled the trade in the Snake River area by the 1820s. The North West Company's interior department of the Columbia was created in June 1816, and Donald Mackenzie was assigned as its head. Mackenzie had previously been employed by Hudson's Bay and had been a partner in the Pacific Fur Company, financed principally by John Jacob Astor. During these early years, he traveled west with a Pacific Fur Company's party and was involved in the initial exploration of the Salmon River and Clearwater River. The company proceeded down the lower Snake River and Columbia River by canoe, and were the first of the Overland Astorians to reach Fort Astoria, on January 18, 1812.

Under Mackenzie, the North West Company was a dominant force in the fur trade in the Snake River country. Out of Fort George in Astoria, Mackenzie led fur brigades up the Snake River in 1816-1817 and up the lower Snake in 1817-1818. Fort Nez Perce, established in July, 1818, became the staging point for Mackenzies' Snake brigades. The expedition of 1818-1819 explored the Blue Mountains, and traveled down the Snake River to the Bear River and approached the headwaters of the Snake. Mackenzie sought to establish a navigable route up the Snake River from Fort Nez Perce to the Boise area in 1819. While he did succeed in traveling by boat from the Columbia River through the Grand Canyon of the Snake past Hells Canyon, he concluded that water transport was generally impractical. Mackenzie held the first rendezvous in the region on the Boise River in 1819.

Despite their best efforts, early American fur companies in this region had difficulty maintaining the long-distance supply lines from the Missouri River system into the Intermountain West. However, Americans William H. Ashley and Jedediah Smith expanded the Saint Louis fur trade into Idaho in 1824. The 1832 trapper's rendezvous at Pierre's Hole, held at the foot of the Three Tetons in modern Teton County, was followed by an intense battle between the Gros Ventre and a large party of American trappers aided by their Nez Perce and Flathead allies.

The prospect of missionary work among the Native Americans also attracted early settlers to the region. In 1809, Kullyspell House, the first white-owned establishment and first trading post in Idaho, was constructed. In 1836, the Reverend Henry H. Spalding established a Protestant mission near Lapwai, where he printed the Northwest's first book, established Idaho's first school, developed its first irrigation system, and grew the state's first potatoes. Narcissa Whitman and Eliza Hart Spalding were the first non-native women to enter present-day Idaho.

Cataldo Mission, the oldest standing building in Idaho, was constructed at Cataldo by the Coeur d'Alene and Catholic missionaries. In 1842, Father Pierre-Jean De Smet, with Fr. Nicholas Point and Br. Charles Duet, selected a mission location along the St. Joe River. The mission was moved a short distance away in 1846, as the original location was subject to flooding. In 1850, Antonio Ravalli designed a new mission building and Indians affiliated with the church effort built the mission, without nails, using the wattle and daub method. In time, the Cataldo mission became an important stop for traders, settlers, and miners. It served as a place for rest from the trail, offered needed supplies, and was a working port for boats heading up the Coeur d'Alene River.

During this time, the region which became Idaho was part of an unorganized territory known as Oregon Country, claimed by both the United States and Great Britain. The United States gained undisputed jurisdiction over the region in the Oregon Treaty of 1846, although the area was under the de facto jurisdiction of the Provisional Government of Oregon from 1843 to 1849. The original boundaries of Oregon Territory in 1848 included all three of the present-day Pacific Northwest states and extended eastward to the Continental Divide. In 1853, areas north of the 46th Parallel became Washington Territory, splitting what is now Idaho in two. The future state was reunited in 1859 after Oregon became a state and the boundaries of Washington Territory were redrawn.

While thousands passed through Idaho on the Oregon Trail or during the California gold rush of 1849, few people settled there. In 1860, the first of several gold rushes in Idaho began at Pierce in present-day Clearwater County. By 1862, settlements in both the north and south had formed around the mining boom.

== Settlement by non-indigenous peoples ==
=== The Church of Jesus Christ of Latter-Day Saints ===
The Church of Jesus Christ of Latter-Day Saints missionaries founded Fort Lemhi in 1855, but the settlement did not last. The first organized town in Idaho was Franklin, settled in April 1860 by Mormon pioneers who believed they were in Utah Territory; although a later survey determined they had crossed the border. Mormon pioneers reached areas near the current-day Grand Teton National Park in Wyoming and established most of the historic and modern communities in Southeastern Idaho. These settlements include Ammon, Blackfoot, Chubbuck, Firth, Idaho Falls, Iona, Pocatello, Rexburg, Rigby, Shelley, and Ucon.

=== English ===
Large numbers of English immigrants settled in what is now the state of Idaho in the late 19th and early 20th century, many before statehood. The English found they had more property rights and paid less taxes than they did back in England. They were considered some of the most desirable immigrants at the time. Many came from humble beginnings and would rise to prominence in Idaho. Frank R. Gooding was raised in a rural working-class background in England, but was eventually elected as the seventh governor of the state. Today people of English descent make up one fifth of the entire state of Idaho and form a plurality in the southern portion of the state.

=== German ===
Many German farmers also settled in what is now Idaho. German settlers were primarily Lutheran across all of the midwest and west, including Idaho, however there were small numbers of Catholics amongst them as well. In parts of Northern Idaho, German remained the dominant language until World War I, when German-Americans were pressured to convert entirely to English. Today, Idahoans of German ancestry make up nearly one fifth of all Idahoans and make up the second largest ethnic group after Idahoans of English descent with people of German ancestry being 18.1% of the state and people of English ancestry being 20.1% of the state.

=== Irish ===
Irish Catholics worked in railroad centers such as Boise. Today, 10% of Idahoans self-identify as having Irish ancestry.

=== African-American ===
York, a slave owned by William Clark but considered a full member of Corps of Discovery during expedition to the Pacific, was the first recorded African American in Idaho. There is a significant African American population made up of those who came west after the abolition of slavery. Many settled near Pocatello and were ranchers, entertainers, and farmers. Although free, many blacks suffered discrimination in the early-to-mid-late 20th century. The black population of the state continues to grow as many come to the state because of educational opportunities, to serve in the military, and for other employment opportunities. There is a Black History Museum in Boise, Idaho, with an exhibit known as the "Invisible Idahoan", which chronicles the first African-Americans in the state. Blacks are the fourth largest ethnic group in Idaho according to the 2000 census. Mountain Home, Boise, and Garden City have significant African-American populations.

=== Basque ===
The Basque people from the Iberian Peninsula in Spain and southern France were traditionally shepherds in Europe. They came to Idaho, offering hard work and perseverance in exchange for opportunity. One of the largest Basque communities in the US is in Boise, with a Basque museum and festival held annually in the city.

=== Chinese ===
Chinese in the mid-19th century came to America through San Francisco to work on the railroad and open businesses. By 1870, there were over 4000 Chinese and they comprised almost 30% of the population. They suffered discrimination due to the Anti-Chinese League in the 19th century which sought to limit the rights and opportunities of Chinese emigrants. Today Asians are third in population demographically after Whites and Hispanics at less than 2%.

== Idaho Territory ==
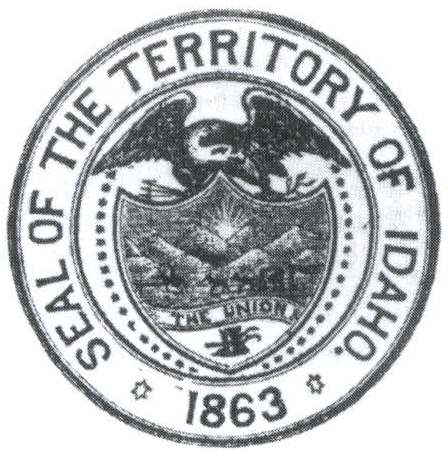
Seal of Idaho Territory 1863-1866

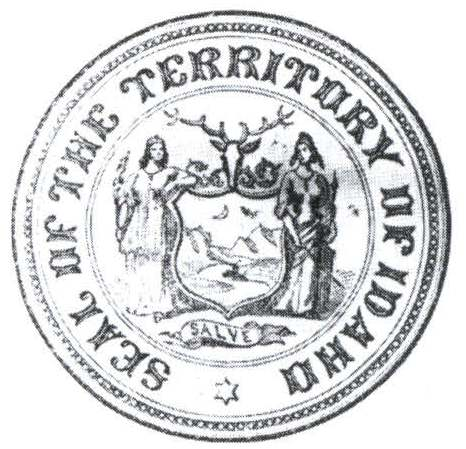
Seal of Idaho Territory 1866-1890

On March 4, 1863, President Abraham Lincoln signed an act creating Idaho Territory from portions of Washington Territory and Dakota Territory with its capital at Lewiston. The original Idaho Territory included most of the areas that later became the states of Idaho, Montana and Wyoming, and had a population of under 17,000. Idaho Territory assumed the boundaries of the modern state in 1868 and was admitted as a state in 1890.

After Idaho became a territory, legislation was held in Lewiston, the capital of Idaho Territory at the time. There were many territories acts put into place, and then taken away during these early sessions, one act being the move of the capital city from Lewiston to Boise City. Boise was becoming a growing area after gold was found, so on December 24, 1864, Boise City was made the final destination of the capital for the Territory of Idaho.

However, moving the capital to Boise City created a lot of issues between the territory. This was especially true between the north and south areas in the territory, due to how far south Boise City was. Problems with communicating between the north and south contributed to some land in Idaho Territory being transferred to other territories and areas at the time. Idaho’s early boundary changes helped create the current boundaries of Washington, Wyoming, and Montana States as currently exist.

In a bid for statehood, Governor Edward A. Stevenson called for a constitutional convention in 1889. The convention approved a constitution on August 6, 1889, and voters approved the constitution on November 5, 1889.

== Statehood ==
When President Benjamin Harrison signed the law admitting Idaho as a U.S. state on July 3, 1890, the population was 88,548. George L. Shoup became the state's first governor, but resigned after only a few weeks in office to take a seat in the United States Senate. Willis Sweet, a Republican, was the first congressman, 1890 to 1895, representing the state at-large. He vigorously demanded "Free Silver" or the unrestricted coinage of silver into legal tender, in order to pour money into the large silver mining industry in the Mountain West, but he was defeated by supporters of the gold standard. In 1896 he, like many Republicans from silver mining districts, supported the Silver Republican Party instead of the regular Republican nominee William McKinley.

=== Miners' uprisings ===
During its first years of statehood, Idaho was plagued by labor unrest in the mining district of Coeur d'Alene. In 1892, miners called a strike which developed into a shooting war between union miners and company guards. Each side accused the other of starting the fight. The first shots were exchanged at the Frisco mine in Frisco, in the Burke-Canyon north and east of Wallace. The Frisco mine was blown up, and company guards were taken prisoner. The violence soon spilled over into the nearby community of Gem, where union miners attempted to locate a Pinkerton spy who had infiltrated their union and was passing information to the mine operators. But agent Charlie Siringo escaped by cutting a hole in the floor of his room. Strikers forced the Gem mine to close, then traveled west to the Bunker Hill mining complex near Wardner, and closed down that facility as well. Several had been killed in the Burke-Canyon fighting. The Idaho National Guard and federal troops were dispatched to the area, and union miners and sympathizers were thrown into bullpens.

Hostilities would again erupt at the Bunker Hill facility in 1899, when seventeen union miners were fired for having joined the union. Other union miners were likewise ordered to draw their pay and leave. Angry members of the union converged on the area and blew up the Bunker Hill Mill, killing two company men.

In both disputes, the union's complaints included pay, hours of work, the right of miners to belong to the union, and the mine owners' use of informants and undercover agents. The violence committed by union miners was answered with a brutal response in 1892 and in 1899.

Through the Western Federation of Miners (WFM) union, the battles in the mining district became closely tied to a major miners' strike in Colorado. The struggle culminated in the December 1905 assassination of former Governor Frank Steunenberg by Harry Orchard (also known as Albert Horsley), a member of the WFM. Orchard was allegedly incensed by Steunenberg's efforts as governor to put down the 1899 miner uprising after being elected on a pro-labor platform.

Pinkerton detective James McParland conducted the investigation into the assassination. In 1907, WFM Secretary Treasurer "Big Bill" Haywood and two other WFM leaders were tried on a charge of conspiracy to murder Steunenberg, with Orchard testifying against them as part of a deal made with McParland. The nationally publicized trial featured Senator William E. Borah as prosecuting attorney and Clarence Darrow representing the defendants. The defense team presented evidence that Orchard had been a Pinkerton agent and had acted as a paid informant for the Cripple Creek Mine Owners' Association. Darrow argued that Orchard's real motive in the assassination had been revenge for a declaration of martial law by Steunenberg, which prompted Orchard to gamble away a share in the Hercules silver mine that would otherwise have made him wealthy.

Two of the WFM leaders were acquitted in two separate trials, and the third was released. Orchard was convicted and sentenced to death. His sentence was commuted, and he spent the rest of his life in an Idaho prison.

=== Mining in Idaho ===
Mining in Idaho was a major commercial venture, bringing a great deal of attention to the state. From 1860-1866 Idaho produced 19% of all gold in the United States, or 2.5 million ounces.

Most of Idaho's mining production, 1860–1969, has come from metals equating to $2.88 billion out of $3.42 billion, according to the best estimates. Of the metallic mining areas of Idaho, the Coeur d'Alene region has produced the most by far, and accounts for about 80% of the total Idaho yield.

==== Mining regions ====
Several others—Boise Basin, Wood River Valley, Stibnite, Blackbirg, and Owyhee—range considerably above the other big producers. Atlanta, Bear Valley, Bay Horse, Florence, Gilmore, Mackay, Patterson, and Yankee Fork all ran on the order of ten to twenty million dollars, and Elk City, Leesburg, Pierce, Rocky Bar, and Warren's make up the rest of the major Idaho mining areas that stand out in the sixty or so regions of production worthy of mention.

A number of small operations do not appear in this list of Idaho metallic mining areas: a small amount of gold was recovered from Goose Creek on Salmon Meadows; a mine near Cleveland was prospected in 1922 and produced a little manganese in 1926; a few tons of copper came from Fort Hall, and a few more tons of copper came from a mine near Montpelier. Similarly, a few tons of lead came from a property near Bear Lake, and lead-silver is known on Cassia Creek near Elba. Some gold quartz and lead-silver workings are on Ruby Creek west of Elk River, and there is a slightly developed copper operation on Deer Creek near Winchester. Molybdenum is known on Roaring River and on the east fork of the Salmon. Some scattered mining enterprises have been undertaken around Soldier Mountain and on Chief Eagle Eye Creek north of Montour.

== Progressive policies ==
Idaho proved to be one of the more receptive states to the progressive agenda of the late 19th century and early 20th century. The state embraced progressive policies such as women's suffrage (1896) and prohibition (1916) before they became federal law. Idahoans were also strongly supportive of Free Silver. The pro-bimetallism Populist and Silver Republican parties of the late 1890s were particularly successful in the state.

Eugenics was also a major part of the Progressive movement. In 1919, the Idaho legislature passed an Act legalizing the forced sterilization of some persons institutionalized in the state. The act was vetoed by governor D.W. Davis, who doubted its scientific merits and believed it likely violated the Equal Protection Clause of the US Constitution. In 1925, the Idaho legislature passed a revised eugenics act, now tailored to avoid Davis's earlier objections. The new law created a state board of eugenics, charged with:

the sterilization of all feebleminded, insane, epileptics, habitual criminals, moral degenerates and sexual perverts who are a menace to society, and providing the means for ascertaining who are such persons.

The Eugenics board was eventually folded into the state's health commission; between 1932 and 1964, a total of 30 women and eight men in Idaho were sterilized under this law. The sterilization law was formally repealed in 1972.

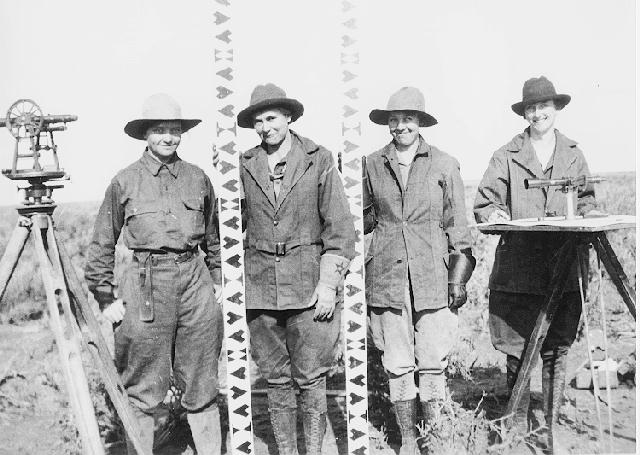
All female survey crew - Minidoka Project, Idaho 1918

After statehood, Idaho's economy began a gradual shift away from mining toward agriculture, particularly in the south. Older mining communities such as Silver City and Rocky Bar gave way to agricultural communities incorporated after statehood, such as Nampa and Twin Falls. Milner Dam on the Snake River, completed in 1905, allowed for the formation of many agricultural communities in the Magic Valley region which had previously been nearly unpopulated.

Meanwhile, some of the mining towns were able to reinvent themselves as resort communities, most notably in Blaine County, where the Sun Valley ski resort opened in 1936. Others, such as Silver City and Rocky Bar, became ghost towns.

== Modern history ==
In the north, mining continued to be an important industry for several more decades. The closure of the Bunker Hill Mine complex in Shoshone County in the early 1980s sent the region's economy into a tailspin. Since that time, a substantial increase in tourism in north Idaho has helped the region to recover. Coeur d'Alene, a lake-side resort town, is a destination for visitors in the area.

Beginning in the 1980s, there was a rise in North Idaho of a few right-wing extremist and "survivalist" political groups, most notably one holding Neo-Nazi views, Aryan Nations. These groups were most heavily concentrated in the Panhandle region of the state, particularly in the vicinity of Coeur d'Alene.

In 1992 a stand-off occurred between U.S. Marshals, the F.B.I., and white separatist Randy Weaver and his family at their compound at Ruby Ridge, located near the small, northern Idaho town of Naples. The ensuing fire-fight and deaths of a U.S. Marshal, and Weaver's son and wife gained national attention, and raised a considerable amount of controversy regarding the nature of acceptable force by the federal government in such situations.

In 2001, the Aryan Nations compound, which had been located in Hayden Lake, Idaho, was confiscated as a result of a court case, and the organization moved out of state. About the same time Boise installed an impressive stone Human Rights Memorial featuring a bronze statue of Anne Frank and quotations from her and many other writers extolling human freedom and equality.

The demographics of the state have changed. Due to this growth in different groups, especially in Boise, the economic expansion surged wrong-economic growth followed the high standard of living and resulted in the "growth of different groups". The population of Idaho in the 21st Century has been described as sharply divided along geographic and cultural lines due to the center of the state being dominated by sparsely populated national forests, mountain ranges and recreation sites: "unless you're willing to navigate a treacherous mountain pass, you can't even drive from the north to the south without leaving the state." The northern population gravitates towards Spokane, Washington, the heavily Mormon south-east population towards Utah, with an isolated Boise "[being] the closest thing to a city-state that you'll find in America."

=== COVID-19 pandemic ===
On March 13, 2020, officials from the Idaho Department of Health and Welfare announced the first confirmed case of the novel coronavirus COVID-19 within the state of Idaho. A woman over the age of 50 from the southwestern part of the state was confirmed to have the coronavirus infection. She contracted the infection while attending a conference in New York City. Conference coordinators notified attendees that three individuals previously tested positive for the coronavirus. The Idahoan did not require hospitalization and was recovering from mild symptoms from her home. At the time of the announcement, there were 1,629 total cases and 41 deaths in the United States. Five days beforehand, on March 8, a man of age 54 had died of an unknown respiratory illness which his doctor had believed to be pneumonia. The disease was later suspected to be – but never confirmed as – COVID-19.

On March 14, state officials announced the second confirmed case within the state. The South Central Public Health District, announced that a woman over the age of 50 that resides in Blaine County had contracted the infection. Like the first case, she did not require hospitalization and she was recovering from mild symptoms from home. Later on in the day, three additional confirmed cases of COVID-19 were reported in the state by three of the seven health districts in the state, which brought the confirmed total cases of coronavirus to five in Idaho. Officials from Central District Health announced their second confirmed case, which was a male from Ada County in his 50s. He was not hospitalized and was recovering at home. South Central Public Health reported their second confirmed case in a female that is over the age of 70 who was hospitalized. Eastern Idaho Public Health reported a confirmed positive case in a woman under the age of 60 in Teton County. She had contracted the coronavirus from contact with a confirmed case in a neighboring state; she was not hospitalized. The South Central Public Health District announced that a woman over the age of 50 that resides in Blaine County had contracted the infection. Like the first case, she did not require hospitalization and she was recovering from mild symptoms from home.

On March 17, two more confirmed cases of the infection were reported, bringing the total to seven. The first case on this date was by officials from Central District Health reported that a female under the age of 50 in Ada County was recovering at home and was not hospitalized. The second confirmed case was a female over the age of 50 as reported by South Central Public Health officials.

On March 18, two additional confirmed cases were announced by South Central Public Health District officials. One is a male from Blaine County in his 40s and the other a male in his 80s from Twin Falls County. These cases were the first known community spread transmission of the coronavirus in South Central Idaho.

== See also ==
- Bibliography of Idaho history
- List of historical societies in Idaho
- History of the Western United States
- List of people from Idaho
- Territorial evolution of Idaho
- Timeline of Idaho history
  - Timeline of Boise, Idaho

== Bibliography ==
- Bancroft, Hubert Howe; Frances Fuller Victor (1890). History of Washington, Idaho and Montana : 1845-1889. San Francisco: History Co. OCLC 9291580.
- Beal, Merrill D.; Merle W. Wells (1953). History of Idaho. New York: Lewis Historical Pub. Co. OCLC 6565869.
- Bieter, John Patrick. "The Basques in Idaho." BOGA: Basque Studies Consortium Journal 6.1 (2018): 3-21. online.
- Bitton, Davis. "The Making of a Community: Blackfoot, Idaho, 1878-1910." Idaho Yesterdays 19#1 (1975): 2-15.
- Brosnan, Cornelius J. History of the state of Idaho (1918) online
- Coates, Lawrence G., et al. "The Mormon Settlement of Southeastern Idaho, 1845-1900." Journal of Mormon History 20.2 (1994): 45-62. online
- Fisher, Vardis; Federal Writers' Project (1938). Idaho Encyclopedia. Caldwell, Idaho: Caxton Printers, Ltd. OCLC 962624.
- Hailey, John. The history of Idaho (1910). online
- Hawley, James Henry. History of Idaho: The Gem of the Mountains: vol 3 (1920), hundreds of short biographies online
- Jensen, Dwight William. Discovering Idaho, a history (1977) online
- Larson, T. A. "Woman's Rights in Idaho." Idaho Yesterdays 16.1 (1972): 218+.
- Lovin, Hugh T. "Dreamers, schemers, and doers of Idaho irrigation." Agricultural history 76.2 (2002): 232-243. online
- Lovin, Hugh T. Complexity in a Ditch: Bringing Water to the Idaho Desert (2017).
- Orthel, Bryan D. "Geography, heritage, and things: Analyzing an agricultural landscape in southern Idaho." Geographical Review 112.4 (2022): 569-590.
- Schwantes, Carlos A. In mountain shadows: A history of Idaho (U of Nebraska Press, 1991). online
- Schwantes, Carlos A. The Pacific Northwest: an interpretive history (U of Nebraska Press, 1996).
- Sims, Robert C.; Hope A. Benedict (1992). Idaho's Governors. Boise, Idaho: College of Social Sciences and Public Affairs, Boise State University. ISBN 0-932129-13-7.
- Sowards, Adam M. ed. Idaho's Place: A New History of the Gem State (2014), essays
- Stapilus, Randy. Idaho Myths and Legends: The True Stories Behind History's Mysteries (Rowman & Littlefield, 2020) online
- Stoll, William Tecumseh. Silver Strike: The true story of silver mining in the Coeur d'Alenes (University of Idaho Press, 1991).
- Wunder, John R. "The Courts and the Chinese in Frontier Idaho," Idaho Yesterdays 25#1 (1981), 23-32.
