= List of people from Idaho =

State flag of Idaho

Location of Idaho in the United States

Following is a list of notable people who were either born in the American state of Idaho or lived there for a substantial amount of time.

== A ==
- William Agee – business executive, Boise
- Joseph Albertson – Albertson's grocery store chain, Caldwell
- Cecil D. Andrus – former United States secretary of the interior and governor of Idaho, Orofino
- James Jesus Angleton – former chief of counter-intelligence, Central Intelligence Agency, Boise
- Chris Appelhans – filmmaker, illustrator, and designer, Firth
- Kristin Armstrong – Olympic gold medal cyclist (2008 and 2012), Boise
- Don Aslett – entrepreneur and author, Twin Falls

== B ==
- Brandon Bair – NFL defensive end, Rexburg
- Matthew Barney – filmmaker and artist, Boise
- Bruce Bastian – co-founder of WordPerfect Software Company, Twin Falls
- Terrel Howard Bell – former United States secretary of education, Lava Hot Springs
- Andy Benoit – NFL writer for Sports Illustrated, Boise
- Ezra Taft Benson – LDS Church president and United States secretary of agriculture, Whitney
- Bowe Bergdahl – U.S. Army soldier charged with desertion, Sun Valley
- Billie Bird – actress and comedian, Pocatello
- Ronee Blakley – actress and singer, Caldwell
- William E. Borah – United States senator, Boise
- Gutzon Borglum – Mount Rushmore sculptor, St. Charles
- Gregory "Pappy" Boyington – WWII Marine fighter ace, Medal of Honor recipient, Coeur d'Alene
- Carol Ryrie Brink – author, Moscow
- Phyllis Brooks – actress and model, Boise
- Edgar Rice Burroughs – creator and author of the Tarzan series, Parma
- MaryJane Butters – organic farmer, author, environmental activist, food manufacturer, and publisher, Moscow

== C ==
- J. D. Cannon – actor, Salmon
- Annetta R. Chipp – president, South Idaho Woman's Christian Temperance Union
- Kerry Christensen – yodeler, Grace
- Michael Christianson – football coach, commentator, Kuna
- Forrester Church – Unitarian Universalist minister, Boise
- Frank Church – United States senator, Boise
- Boyd Coddington – car customizer, Rupert
- Georgia Coleman – diver, gold medalist at 1932 Olympics, St. Maries
- Clancy Cooper – actor, Boise
- Genevieve Cortese – actress, Supernatural, Wildfire, Sun Valley
- Larry Craig – United States senator, Midvale
- Ella D. Crawford – president, South Idaho Woman's Christian Temperance Union
- Lewis Croft – actor with dwarfism, Shelley
- Chris Crutcher – writer and family therapist, Cascade
- Dan Cummins – comedian, Riggins

== D ==
- Ken Dayley – Major League pitcher, Jerome
- Raquel Devine – porn actress, Meridian
- Gloria Dickson – actress, Pocatello
- Lillian Disney – wife of Walt Disney, Spalding
- Lou Dobbs – television news anchor, Rupert
- Claire Du Brey – actress, Bonners Ferry
- Fred Dubois – United States senator, Blackfoot
- Patty Duke – actress, Coeur d'Alene

== E ==
- Logan Emory – MLS defender, Boise
- Shirley Englehorn – professional golfer, Caldwell

== F ==
- Bill Fagerbakke – actor, Rupert
- Philo Farnsworth – inventor of television, Rigby
- A. J. Feeley – NFL quarterback, Caldwell
- W. Mark Felt – FBI official known as Deep Throat, Twin Falls
- Stephen Fife – MLB pitcher, Boise
- Bernie Fisher – Vietnam War pilot, Medal of Honor recipient, Kuna
- Vardis Fisher – author, Hagerman
- Mary Hallock Foote – author, Boise
- John Foreman – film producer, Idaho Falls
- John Friesz – NFL quarterback, Coeur d'Alene
- Bryan Fuller – screenwriter, television producer, Lewiston
- Christina Fulton – actress, Boise

== G ==
- Jeremy Gable – playwright, Post Falls
- Adam Blue Galli – one of the "Preppie Bandits"
- Mike Garman – MLB pitcher, Caldwell
- Julie Gibson – actress, Lewiston
- Jordan Gross – NFL offensive tackle, Fruitland

== H ==
- Philip Habib – Middle East peace envoy of three presidents and ambassador, Moscow
- Nick Hagadone – MLB pitcher, Sandpoint
- Gregg Hale – musician and producer, Idaho Falls
- Korey Hall – NFL fullback, Glenns Ferry
- Kate Harrington – actress, Boise
- Brad Harris – actor, stuntman, St. Anthony
- Gene Harris – jazz musician, Boise
- Dree Hemingway – fashion model, actress, Sun Valley
- Ernest Hemingway – author, Ketchum
- Margaux Hemingway – actress, Ketchum
- Mariel Hemingway – actress, Ketchum
- Christina Hendricks – actress, Twin Falls
- Jared Hess – filmmaker, Preston
- Josh Hill – NFL tight end, Blackfoot
- Michael Hoffman – filmmaker, Payette
- Merril Hoge – NFL running back and sportscaster, Pocatello
- Chris Horn – NFL wide receiver, Notus
- Doris Houck – actress, Wallace
- James Hoyt – MLB pitcher, Boise
- Howard W. Hunter – LDS Church president, Boise

== J ==
- Larry Jackson – MLB pitcher, state representative, Nampa
- Sherry Jackson – actress, Wendell
- Christian Jacobs – musician, television producer, voice actor, Rexburg
- Johnny James – MLB relief pitcher, Bonners Ferry
- Bobby Jenks – MLB relief pitcher, Spirit Lake
- Phil Johnson – pro basketball coach, Grace
- Chief Joseph – Nez Perce leader

== K ==
- Harold Kelley – social psychologist, Boise
- Dirk Kempthorne – former United States secretary of the interior, U.S. senator and governor of Idaho, Boise
- George Kennedy – Academy Award-winning actor, Boise
- Harmon Killebrew – Hall of Fame baseball player, Payette
- Dirk Koetter – NFL head coach, Tampa Bay Buccaneers, Pocatello
- Gus Kohntopp – pilot, Buhl
- Mary Kornman – child actress, Idaho Falls
- Jerry Kramer – NFL offensive guard, Sandpoint
- Paul Kruger – NFL linebacker, Rexburg

== L ==
- Rita La Roy – actress, Bonners Ferry
- Vance Law – baseball player, Boise
- Vernon Law – baseball player, Meridian
- Mark Lindsay – musician, Caldwell, now Grangeville
- Matt Lindstrom – baseball pitcher, Rexburg
- Sean Paul Lockhart – actor, director, Lewiston
- Jeanette Loff – actress and singer, Orofino
- Larry Lujack – radio personality, started his career in Caldwell
- Clarence Lung – actor, Boise

== M ==
- Doug Martsch – musician, Boise
- Bonnie McCarroll – rodeo performer, Boise
- Shea McClellin – NFL linebacker, Caldwell
- Richard McKenna – author, Mountain Home
- Patrick F. McManus – author, Sandpoint
- Bob Mizer – photographer and filmmaker, Hailey
- Rob Morris – NFL linebacker, Nampa
- Randy Mueller – NFL executive, St. Maries

== O ==
- Jack O'Connor – author, hunting and shooting sports editor of Outdoor Life, Lewiston
- Olive Osmond – matriarch of the Osmond singing family, Samaria
- Brock Osweiler – NFL quarterback for the Denver Broncos, Coeur d'Alene

== P ==
- Thom Pace – singer-songwriter, Boise
- Sarah Palin – politician, Sandpoint
- Matt Paradis – NFL center, Council
- Cheryl Paris – actress, Burley
- Aaron Paul – actor, Emmett
- Kimberlee Peterson – actress, Boise
- Cody Pickett – NFL quarterback, Caldwell
- Jay Pickett – actor, Caldwell
- Jake Pitts – guitarist, rock band Black Veil Brides, Boise
- Jake Plummer – NFL quarterback, Boise
- Ezra Pound – poet, Hailey
- Bridget Powers – erotic film actress, Boise

== R ==
- Martha Raddatz – reporter with ABC News, Idaho Falls
- Ford Rainey – actor, Mountain Home
- V. Lane Rawlins – president emeritus, Washington State University, southeast Idaho
- Barbara Jane Reams – actress, Burley
- Paul Revere – musician, Caldwell
- Marjorie Reynolds – actress, Buhl
- Luke Ridnour – NBA point guard, Coeur d'Alene
- Doug Riesenberg – NFL offensive tackle, Moscow
- Mike Riley – college football coach, Wallace
- Josh Ritter – singer-songwriter, Moscow
- Marilynne Robinson – winner of 2005 Pulitzer Prize for Fiction, Sandpoint
- Ron Romanick – MLB pitcher and pitching coach, Burley
- Scott Rozell – musician, Scatterbox, Moral Crux, Coeur d'Alene

== S ==
- Bill Salkeld – Major League Baseball catcher, Pocatello
- Jason Schmidt – Major League Baseball pitcher, Lewiston
- Ken Schrom – Major League Baseball pitcher and current minor league executive, Grangeville
- Jake Scott – guard with Philadelphia Eagles, Lewiston
- Larry Scott – IFBB professional bodybuilder, Blackfoot
- Richard G. Scott – member of Quorum of the Twelve Apostles of the LDS Church, Pocatello
- Jill Seaman – doctor and public health advocate, Moscow
- Johnny Sequoyah – child actress, Boise
- Jeremy Shada – actor, musician, singer, Boise
- Zack Shada – actor, producer, director, Boise
- Brandi Sherwood – Miss Teen USA 1989, and assumed title of Miss USA 1997, Idaho Falls
- J. R. Simplot – industrialist, Declo
- Nikki Sixx – musician, co-founder of Mötley Crüe, Jerome
- Robert E. Smylie – former governor of Idaho, Boise
- Rosalie Sorrels – singer-songwriter, Boise County
- Henry Spalding – missionary, Lapwai Valley
- Beatrice Sparks – therapist, Mormon youth counselor, Custer County
- Chaske Spencer – actor, lived in Kooskia, Lapwai and Lewiston
- Frank Steunenberg – assassinated governor of Idaho, Caldwell
- Gary Stevens – Hall of Fame jockey, Caldwell
- Jerramy Stevens – NFL tight end, Boise
- Edward Stevenson – Oscar-winning costume designer, Pocatello
- Curtis Stigers – musician and songwriter, Boise
- Picabo Street – world and Olympic champion skier, Triumph
- Kristine Sutherland – actress, Boise
- Scott Syme – politician, Weiser

== T ==
- Renee Tenison – model and actress, Caldwell
- Rosie Tenison – model and actress, Caldwell
- Hugh Thornton – guard for the Indianapolis Colts, Boise
- Ted Trueblood – outdoor writer, sportsman, and conservationist, Nampa
- Glenn Tryon – actor, writer, director, Juliaetta
- Lana Turner – actress, Wallace

== U ==
- Brady Udall – author

== V ==
- Leighton Vander Esch – NFL linebacker, Riggins
- Walter Varney – aviation industry pioneer, Boise

== W ==
- Wayne Walker – NFL linebacker, Boise
- Mel Wasserman – founder of CEDU Family of Services, Bonner
- Dick Wesson – movie and television announcer, Boise
- Tara Westover – author, Clifton
- Rumer Willis – actress, Hailey
- Edwin P. Wilson – CIA officer, Nampa
- Larry Wilson – NFL free safety, Rigby
- Torrie Wilson – WWE wrestler, model, Boise
- Jefferson Wood – illustrator, Boise
- Robert S. Wood – leader in the Church of Jesus Christ of Latter-day Saints, Idaho Falls
- Jonathan M. Woodward – actor, Moscow
- Victor Wooten – Grammy Award-winning bass guitarist, Mountain Home

== X-Z ==
- La Monte Young – avant-garde artist, composer and musician, Bern
- Norma Zimmer – singer with Lawrence Welk, Shoshone County

== See also ==
- Lists of Americans

Lists of politicians and government officials

- List of governors of Idaho
- List of justices of the Idaho Supreme Court
- List of mayors of Boise, Idaho
- List of speakers of the Idaho House of Representatives
- List of United States representatives from Idaho
- List of United States senators from Idaho

Other lists of people from Idaho

- List of Idaho suffragists
- List of Brigham Young University–Idaho alumni
- List of University of Idaho people
