= Wesley P. Lloyd =

American college administrator (1904–1977)

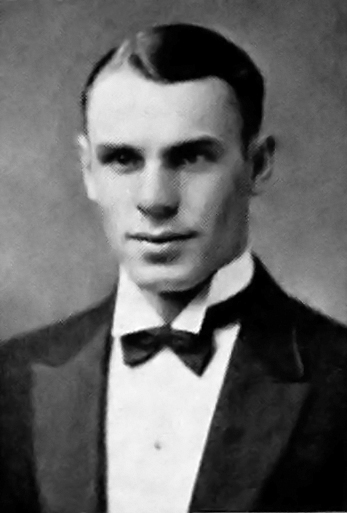
- Lloyd in 1926
- Born: Wesley Parkinson Lloyd; June 16, 1904; Ogden, Utah
- Died: March 7, 1977 (aged 72); La Jolla, California
- Occupation(s): Teacher and administrator
- Spouse: Lucille Murdock
- Children: 3

Wesley Parkinson Lloyd (June 16, 1904 – March 7, 1977) was an American college administrator in several universities including Brigham Young University and the United States International University. Lloyd was a member of the Church of Jesus Christ of Latter-day Saints (LDS Church) and served an LDS mission. He taught at Rexburg High School and after, worked as a principal of seminary. After receiving his master's and doctorate degrees, Lloyd worked at multiple universities, including BYU, the United States International University, and California Western College. In his personal life, Lloyd married Lucille Murdock in 1926 and had three children. He died on March 7, 1977, at the age of 72.

== Early life ==
Wesley Parkinson Lloyd was born June 16, 1904, in Ogden, Utah. His parents were Charles E. Lloyd and Lucy Parkinson. Lloyd was baptized into the LDS Church on April 8, 1913, by John B. Fehr. Lloyd attended a Latter-day Saint high school in Salt Lake City, Utah. He went on to attend BYU.

Lloyd was married on December 30, 1926, to Lucille "Lillie" Murdock. The couple had three children together. He graduated in 1927 from BYU with his bachelor's degree in philosophy of education. Lloyd served a mission for the LDS Church under B. H. Roberts to the Eastern States Mission. He was a missionary from June 1929 until August 1929.

== Career ==
Lloyd taught at Rexburg High School in Rexburg, Idaho, for three years. After teaching in Rexburg, he taught as a principal of seminary for the LDS Church in both Grace and Oakley, Idaho. While overseeing seminary, Lloyd worked on his master's degree, which he completed from BYU in 1934. In 1937, he graduated with his doctorate degree in religion and education from the University of Chicago.

Lloyd worked in the Department of Philosophy of Education from 1937 to 1969 at BYU. He was the department chair from 1937 to 1944, the Dean of Men from 1938 until 1960, and the dean of the graduate school, from 1960 to 1969. He then retired from BYU to work as the dean at the United States International University. He worked there from 1969 until 1972. He then became the director of California Western College. He worked in that capacity until 1976. He was elected the chair of the Center for Leadership Education from 1974 to 1977.

Lloyd died on March 7, 1977, in La Jolla, California.
