= Edward J. Curtis =

American statesman (1827–1895)

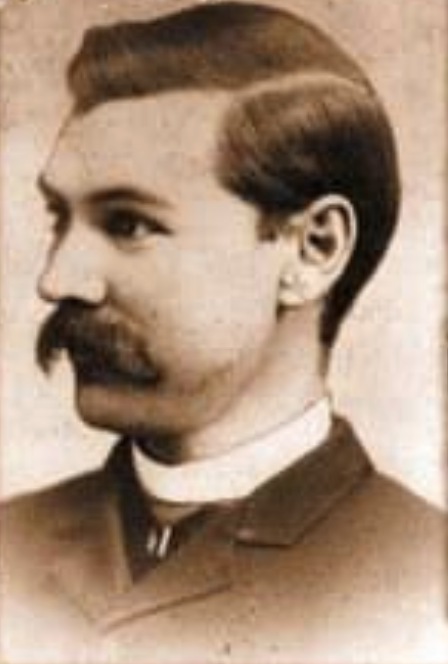
- Curtis, circa 1860–1870

5th & 10th Secretary of the Territory of Idaho
- In office February 12, 1885 – November 1890
- Appointed by: Chester A. Arthur; Benjamin Harrison
- Preceded by: D. P. B. Pride
- Succeeded by: A.J. Pinkham
- In office April 5, 1869 – April 29, 1878
- Appointed by: Ulysses S. Grant
- Preceded by: S.R. Howlett
- Succeeded by: Robert A. Sidebotham

Adjutant General of Idaho
- In office 1890–1893
- Appointed by: George L. Shoup

Member of the California State Assembly from the 12th district
- In office September 6, 1854 – November 4, 1856

Personal details
- Born: 1827 Worcester, Massachusetts, U.S.
- Died: December 31, 1895 (aged 68) Boise, Idaho, U.S.
- Party: Whig (1854–1855); Know Nothing (1855–1856); Republican (from 1856)
- Children: Edward L. Curtis
- Education: Princeton University

Military service
- Allegiance: United States
- Branch/service: United States Army
- Years of service: 1861–1864
- Rank: Second lieutenant
- Battles/wars: American Civil War

Edward J. Curtis (1827 – December 31, 1895) was an American statesman, lawyer, journalist, military officer, pioneer, and frontiersman who served as Idaho's territorial secretary from 1869 to 1878 and then again from 1885 to 1890. He also held the position of Adjutant General of Idaho from 1890 to 1893, and previously, from 1854 to 1856, was a member of the California State Assembly.

== Background and education ==
Curtis was born in 1827 in Worcester, Massachusetts. There, he attended local public schools, and would later attend Princeton University in New Jersey, graduating with high honors, whereupon he returned to his hometown of Worcester but went to Boston shortly thereafter, beginning the study of law in the office of Rufus Choate.

== Law, journalism, public office, and military service ==
=== California (1848–1864) ===
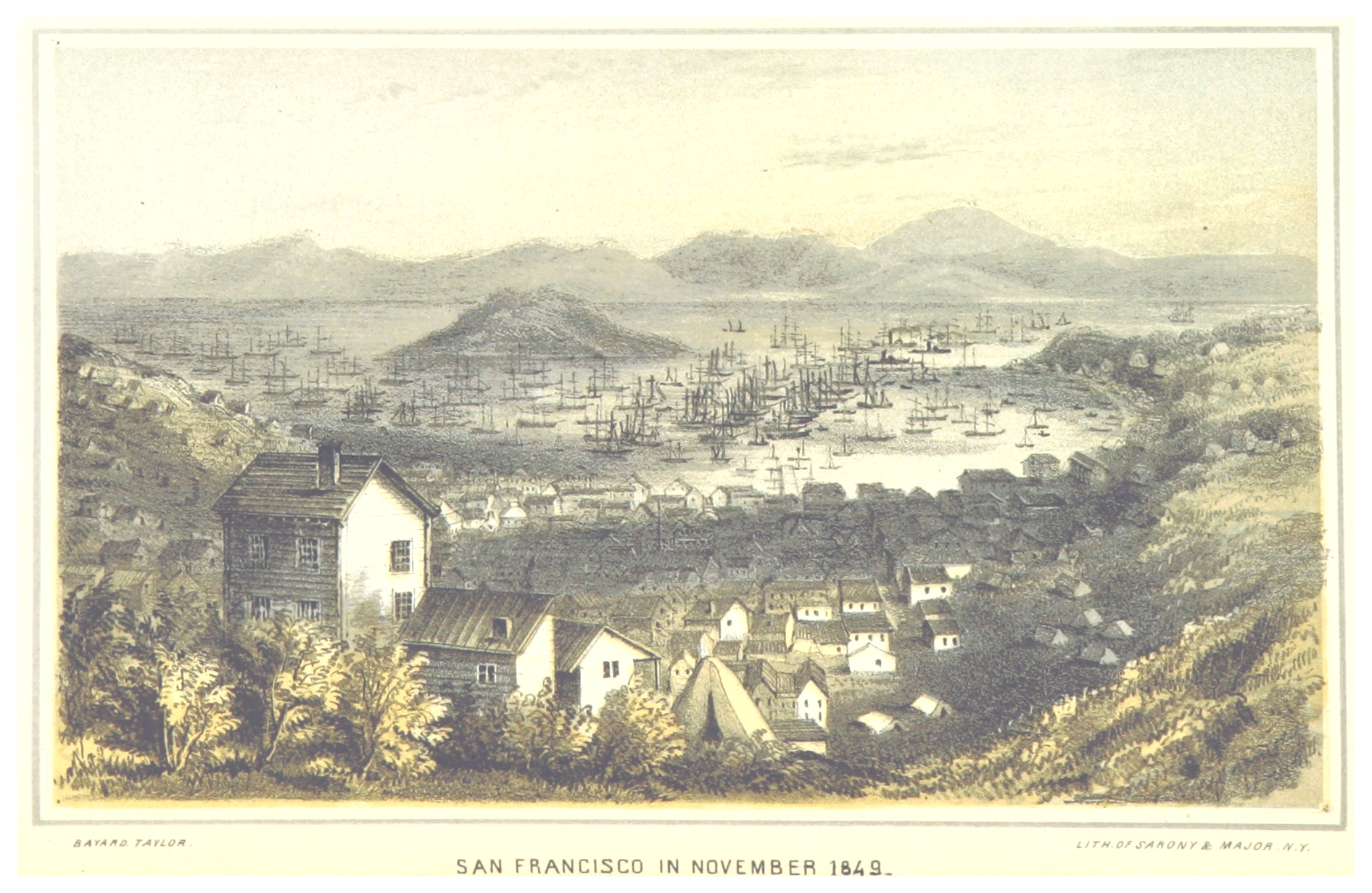
San Francisco in 1849, the same year Curtis arrived

In 1848, upon hearing the news of gold being discovered in California, the aspiring lawyer decided to settle there, arriving in San Francisco in early 1849. He did not stay there for long, however, and would move to San Jose and later Sacramento.

In 1851, Curtis relocated yet again, this time to Yreka, where he became an editor of a local newspaper.

==== Local political affairs ====
Three years later, in 1854, Curtis was elected as a California State Representative, serving in the Assembly for two terms; during his first term he was a Whig, and during his second he was a Know Nothing.

In April 1856, while in Sacramento, Curtis was admitted to the bar, and would set about his practice in Weaverville. He would subsequently be elected judge of the court of sessions of Northern California. He also became the owner and publisher of a regional gazette, the Trinity County Journal.

==== American Civil War ====
During the American Civil War, Curtis, serving as a judge at the time, was appointed as a second lieutenant by California Governor John G. Downey in a company of the Second Brigade of California Volunteers.

=== Idaho (1864–1895) ===
In 1864, he traveled to Silver City, Idaho, accompanied by Richard Miller and Hill Beachey. In that thriving mining town, he and Miller established a law practice. Two years subsequent, Miller was appointed by the president as judge of the second judicial district of the territory, while Curtis was elected district attorney, leading him to take up residence in Boise.

==== Territorial secretary ====
On April 5, 1869, Curtis was appointed territorial secretary of Idaho by President Ulysses S. Grant. That year, Curtis also played a key role in establishing the Idaho Law Library, securing a $5,000 appropriation from Washington, D.C.

In 1872, he was chosen as a delegate to the Republican National Convention in Philadelphia, where he cast his vote in favor of Grant's renomination; he would be reappointed as territorial secretary, during which time he also served as acting governor of Idaho for four years.

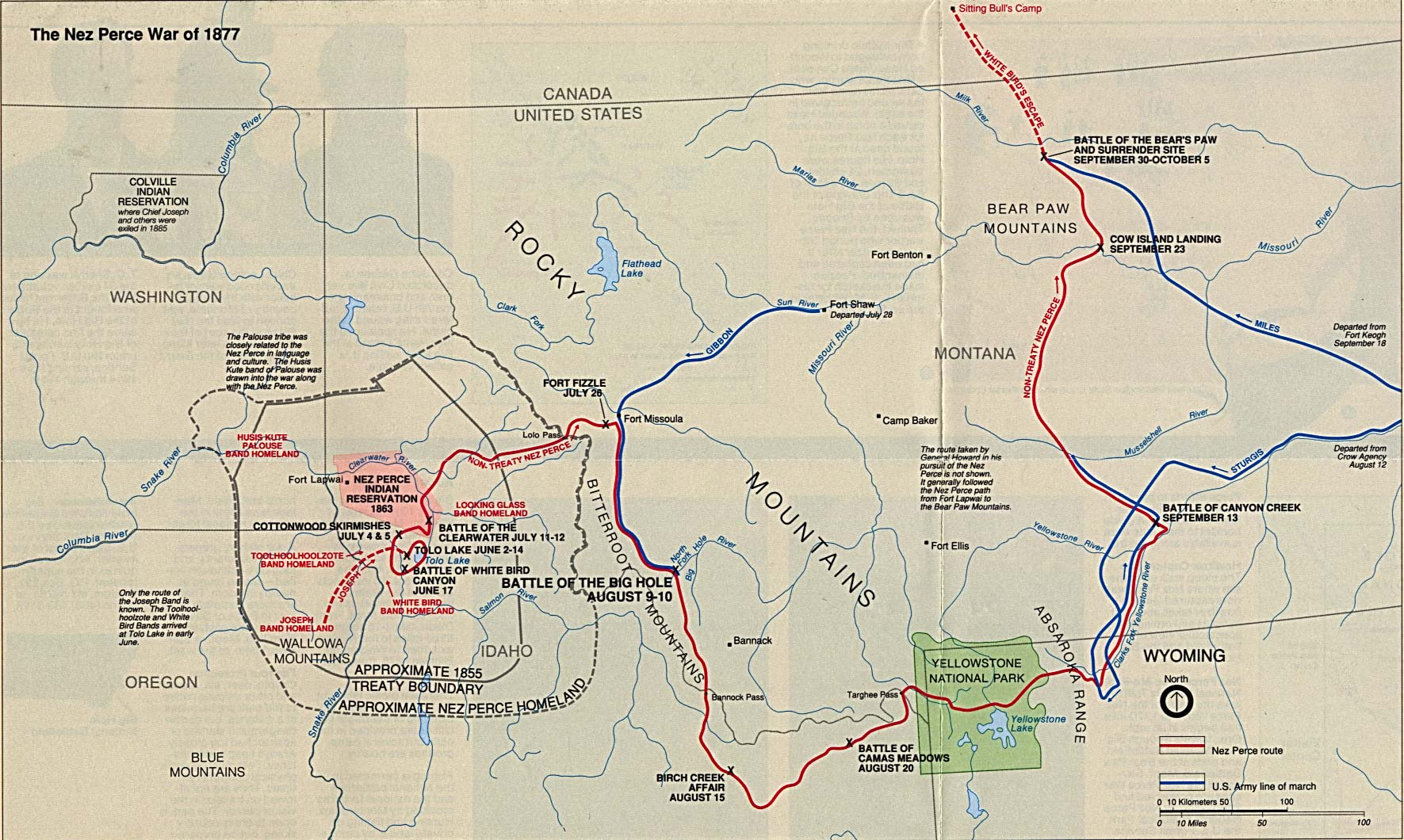
Battle map of the Nez Perce War

When the Nez Perce War broke out in 1877, he held the position of adjutant-general of the territory and successfully negotiated peace treaties with several chiefs in southern Idaho. His performance in these roles, which was said to be admirable, earned him a strong reputation, leading President Chester A. Arthur to appoint him again as territorial secretary. President Benjamin Harrison reappointed him in 1889, and he would remain in the position until Idaho's admission to the Union, when new officials took over in November 1890.

== Personal life ==
In 1856, Curtis wed Susan L. Frost in Sacramento, California, and together they had four children. Among his children was Edward L. Curtis, who also served as Idaho's territorial secretary and acting governor; however, his life came to an abrupt end in 1890. His only daughter, Anna, married Dr. J. K. DuBois, a Boise physician.

Upon retiring from politics, Curtis returned to his previous practice of law, continuing until he fell ill at the age of 68. He ultimately succumbed to this illness on December 31, 1895; he was survived by his wife and all of his children, with the exception of his eldest son—as previously noted.

Curtis's funeral, organized by the Independent Order of Odd Fellows, saw attendance from a hundred lodge members, the Ada County Bar Association, the Zouaves, and a military drill unit.
