= Grace Joint School District =

School district in Idaho, United States

Location
- Grace, Idaho United States

District information
- Type: Public
- Grades: K-12
- Established: 1953
- Superintendent: Dr. Jason Moss

Students and staff
- Teachers: 37
- Staff: 112
- Athletic conference: High Desert Conference
- Colors: Red, Gray, and White

Other information
- Website: Grace Grizzlies

The Grace Joint School District is a school district in Grace, Idaho.

== Schools ==
- Grace Jr./Sr. High School
- Black Canyon Elementary School

== District Board ==
- Ryan Christensen (Zone 5), Board Chair
- Laura Johnson (Zone 4), Board Vice-Chair
- Justin Andersen (Zone 1)
- Emily Smith (Zone 2)
- Andrea Smith (Zone 3)
- Jason Moss, Superintendent
- Billie Ann Straatman, District Clerk
