= Home on the Range (2004 film) =

2004 animated Disney film

- Theatrical release poster
- Directed by: Will Finn; John Sanford
- Written by: Will Finn; John Sanford
- Story by: Will Finn; John Sanford; Michael LaBash; Sam Levine; Mark Kennedy; Robert Lence
- Produced by: Alice Dewey Goldstone
- Starring: Roseanne Barr; Judi Dench; Jennifer Tilly; Cuba Gooding Jr.; Randy Quaid; Steve Buscemi
- Edited by: H. Lee Peterson
- Music by: Alan Menken
- Production company: Walt Disney Feature Animation
- Distributed by: Buena Vista Pictures Distribution (Note: Distributed under the Walt Disney Pictures banner)
- Release dates: March 21, 2004 (El Capitan Theatre); April 2, 2004 (United States)
- Running time: 76 minutes
- Country: United States
- Language: English
- Budget: $110 million
- Box office: $145.3 million

Home on the Range is a 2004 American animated western film produced by Walt Disney Feature Animation. Written and directed by Will Finn and John Sanford, it stars the voices of Roseanne Barr, Judi Dench, Jennifer Tilly, Cuba Gooding Jr., Randy Quaid, and Steve Buscemi.

The film is set in the Old West and follows a mismatched trio of dairy cows—brash, adventurous Maggie; prim, proper Mrs. Calloway; and ditzy, happy-go-lucky Grace. The three cows must capture an infamous rustler named Alameda Slim for his bounty in order to save their idyllic farm from foreclosure. Aiding them in their quest is Lucky Jack, a feisty, peg-legged rabbit, and a selfish horse named Buck, eagerly working in the service of Rico, a famous bounty hunter, who seeks the glory for himself. The film features original songs written by Alan Menken and Glenn Slater, and an original musical orchestral score also composed by Menken.

Home on the Range premiered at the El Capitan Theatre in Los Angeles, California on March 21, 2004, and was theatrically released in the United States by Buena Vista Pictures Distribution on April 2. The film received mixed reviews from critics, and underperformed at the box office, grossing $145.3 million against a $110 million budget.

== Plot ==
In 1889, amidst the Old West, wanted cattle rustler Alameda Slim depletes almost all cattle from the Dixon Ranch, leaving only a single show cow, Maggie. The ranch owner, Abner Dixon, sells her to a kind woman named Pearl Gesner, who runs a small farm called Patch of Heaven.

Sam Brown, the local Sheriff, arrives to tell Pearl that unless she pays back the bank in three days, her farm will be sold to the highest bidder. Hearing this, Maggie convinces farm cows Grace and Mrs. Calloway to go to town with her to win prize money at a fair. While the cows are in town, a bounty hunter named Rico drops off a criminal, collects their reward, and looks for a replacement horse while his rests. Idolizing him, Sam's horse, Buck, convinces Rico to take him. Upon seeing this and learning the reward for capturing Slim will cover Pearl's debt, Maggie convinces the other cows to help her collect the reward to save Patch of Heaven.

That night, they hide among a large herd of steers as they are approached by two longhorns Barry and Bob. Slim arrives on the back of his bison Junior with his nephews, the Willies. Before Maggie can attack him, Slim starts yodeling, which puts all of the cattle except the tone-deaf Grace into a hypnotic trance, allowing Slim to lead them away. Grace brings Maggie and Mrs. Calloway back to their senses, before Slim uses a landslide to cover his escape. Narrowly missing him, Rico and his men discuss their next move, while Buck argues with the cows, with Rico mistakenly believing he is skittish around cows and has him returned to Sam. However, Buck escapes, determined to capture Slim for himself to prove his worth.

The cows continue their search in the hopes of capturing Slim before Buck, until they lose Buck's trail during a flash flood and have a falling out, with Mrs. Calloway believing Maggie only wants revenge and Patch of Heaven would be better off without her. Along the way, the cows are joined by a peg-legged jackrabbit named Lucky Jack, who also lost his home, an old mine, to Slim. The cows decide to follow him, with Mrs. Calloway and Maggie making a deal that after the farm is saved, they will go their separate ways. With Lucky Jack's help, the cows discover Slim converted the mine into his hideout and stole cattle from his former patrons to render them unable to support their land. When the subsequent auctions occur, he then disguises himself as respectable businessman "Yancy O'Dell" to buy their land using the money he makes from selling off the stolen cattle.

The cows and Jack capture Slim, and rush back to Patch of Heaven, with the Willies and Rico in pursuit. Learning Rico works for Slim, a devastated Buck helps the cows fight him, setting the stolen cattle free in the process. Slim escapes and dons his disguise to buy Patch of Heaven, but the cows catch up to him and join forces with Buck, Jack, and the rest of Patch of Heaven's farm animals to defeat and expose him. As Sam arrests Slim, Pearl uses the reward money to save her farm.

At first, Mrs. Calloway, who had come to like Maggie, and Grace are sad that Maggie had seemingly left, but their spirits are lifted when they see that Maggie decided to stay. Maggie, Mrs. Calloway, Grace, and the rest of the farm animals then won prizes as show livestock in the State Fair. The three cows, along with Barry, Bob, and Junior, celebrate with a square dance.

== Voice cast ==
- Roseanne Barr as Maggie, a hereford show cow and the newest animal on Little Patch of Heaven farm. (Note: Chris Buck served as the supervising animator for Maggie.)
- Judi Dench as Mrs. Calloway, a Holstein cow and the leader of the animals on the farm, who speaks with a British accent. (Note: Duncan Marjoribanks served as the supervising animator for Mrs. Calloway.)
- Jennifer Tilly as Grace, an optimistic and innocent-minded jersey cow. (Note: Mark Henn served as the supervising animator for Grace, Rusty and Wesley.)
- Cuba Gooding Jr. as Buck, a Thoroughbred horse and Rico's biggest fan that dreams of being a hero. (Note: Michael Surrey served as the supervising animator for Buck.)
- Randy Quaid as Alameda Slim, a cattle rustler wanted by law. (Note: Dale Baer served as the supervising animator for Slim and Junior.)
- Charles Dennis as Rico, a famous bounty hunter and Buck's idol. (Note: Russ Edmonds served as the supervising animator for Rico.)
- Charles Haid as Lucky Jack, a clumsy jackrabbit with a wooden leg that he says brings good luck. (Note: Shawn Keller served as the lead animator for Lucky Jack.)
- Carole Cook as Pearl Gesner, a farmer who is the owner of Patch of Heaven. (Note: Bruce W. Smith served as the supervising animator for Pearl.)
- Joe Flaherty as Jeb, a goat living in Patch of Heaven who collects a bunch of cans that he is protective of. (Note: Sandro Cleuzo served as the supervising animator of Jeb and the sheriff.)
- Steve Buscemi as Wesley, a black market businessman and cattle dealer who negotiates with Slim.
- Sam J. Levine as the Willie Brothers, Slim's three dimwitted nephews and henchmen. David Burnham, Jason Graae and Gregory Jbara provide their singing voices. (Note: Russ Edmonds served as the supervising animator for the Willies.)
- Richard Riehle as Sam Brown, the town's sheriff and Buck's owner.
- Lance LeGault as Junior, Alameda Slim's pet buffalo who serves as Slim's mode of transportation.
- G.W. Bailey as Rusty, Sam's Basset Hound and Buck's best friend.
- Estelle Harris as Audrey, a chicken living in Patch of Heaven.
- Charlie Dell as Ollie, a pig living in Patch of Heaven.
- Bobby Block, Keaton Savage, and Ross Simanteris as The Piggies, Ollie's sons.
- Marshall Efron as Larry, a duck living in Patch of Heaven.
- Mark Walton as Barry and Bob, two Texas longhorns that become smitten with Maggie, Mrs. Calloway, and Grace.
- Governor Ann Richards as Annie, a saloon owner whose saloon the cows mistake for Sam's office.
- Dennis Weaver as Abner Dixon, Maggie's former owner.
- Patrick Warburton as Patrick, a horse who takes Rico to Slim's lair.

== Production ==
Before coming up with Pocahontas (1995), director Mike Gabriel considered adapting Western legends such as Annie Oakley, Buffalo Bill and Pecos Bill into animated films. While he pitched both projects at the Gong Show meeting, the executives were more interested in Pocahontas, which went into production first. When Pocahontas was finished, Gabriel went back to his Western pitch and came up with an "idea that might combine Captains Courageous with a Western." The initial story involved a young boy from the Far East whose father owns a railroad and sends his son to the Western United States to teach him maturity. According to Gabriel, "the train gets held up by outlaws over a train trestle, and the little boy gets knocked off the train ... He splashes in the river and ends up on a cattle drive." Gabriel developed his story into a forty-page film treatment, which was well received by then-Feature Animation president Peter Schneider. Soon after, the project, then titled Sweating Bullets, went into development.

Inspired by the song "Ghost Riders in the Sky", the story was then revised into a supernatural western about a timid cowboy who visits a ghost town and confronts an undead cattle rustler named Slim. In this version, he and the Willies rode their ghost herds through the clouds and constantly drove livestock off cliffs to increase their herd. It was later reconceived into a story about a little bull named Bullets, that wanted to be more like the horses that led the herd. In 1999, in an attempt to salvage the production and retain the existing characters and background art, story artist Michael LaBash suggested a different approach to the story with one that involved three cow protagonists who become bounty hunters to save the farm. Building on the idea, fellow story artists Sam Levine, Mark Kennedy, Robert Lence, and Shirley Pierce developed a new storyline. However, by October 2000, Gabriel and co-director Mike Giaimo were removed from the project because of persistent story problems. Will Finn, who had returned to Disney Feature Animation after co-directing The Road to El Dorado (2000) at DreamWorks Animation, and John Sanford were hired as the new directors.

By this point, there were twelve storyboard artists and four screenwriters, including David Reynolds, working on the film. Finn and Sanford decided to downsize the writing team, with Reynolds later being recruited to write the Finding Nemo screenplay. At one point, the story incorporated elements from the Pied Piper story. Following a suggestion by Alan Menken, Alameda Slim was reconceived into a cattle rustler who used his yodeling talents to hypnotize and abscond with the herd. The character Pearl Gesner, who was to be voiced by Sarah Jessica Parker, was rewritten into an elderly woman. Relatively late into production, the character Maggie was also rewritten to make her an outsider to the other farm animals in order to differentiate the group dynamic.

== Music ==
Home on the Range: An Original Walt Disney Records Soundtrack

Soundtrack album by Various Artists
- Released: March 30, 2004
- Recorded: 2003
- Length: 42:57
- Label: Walt Disney
- Producer: Alan Menken

In February 1998, Alan Menken had signed a long-term agreement with the Walt Disney Studios to compose songs and/or scores for animated and live-action films. Following this, according to Menken, he was attached to provide music for Sweating Bullets "maybe a year and a half after Hercules". Shortly after winning the ASCAP Foundation Richard Rodgers New Horizons Award, lyricist Glenn Slater was brought to the attention of Menken, who invited Slater to work with him on Sweating Bullets.

Together, they wrote the first of the film's six original songs back in 1999; the first of which was "Little Patch of Heaven" recorded by k.d. lang before Finn and Sanford were brought on board as directors. The villain song "Yodel-Adle-Eedle-Idle-Oo," which incorporates the "William Tell Overture," Yankee Doodle, Beethoven's Ninth Symphony, and the "1812 Overture" into the yodel dance, was added following several story changes throughout production. Although Randy Quaid did his own singing for "Yodel-Adle-Eedle-Idle-Oo", including the consonants heard during the yodels, the vowel sounds in the yodeling were overdubbed from ghost singers Randy Erwin and Kerry Christensen, two world champion yodelers. Following the September 11 attacks, Menken composed the song "Will the Sun Ever Shine Again" in reaction, which was performed by Bonnie Raitt.

The soundtrack album of the film was released on March 30, 2004, by Walt Disney Records. It contains vocal songs performed by k.d. lang, Randy Quaid, Bonnie Raitt, Tim McGraw, and The Beu Sisters along with the film's score composed by Alan Menken.

=== Songs ===
Original songs performed in the film include:

No.	Title	Performer(s)	Length
1.	"(You Ain't) Home On The Range"	Chorus
2.	"Little Patch of Heaven"	k.d. lang
3.	"Yodel-Adle-Eedle-Idle-Oo"	Randy Quaid; partial dubbing by Randy Erwin and Kerry Christensen
4.	"Will the Sun Ever Shine Again"	Bonnie Raitt
5.	"(You Ain't) Home on the Range (Echo Mine Reprise)"	Chorus
6.	"Wherever the Trail May Lead"	Tim McGraw
7.	"Anytime You Need A Friend"	The Beu Sisters

== Release ==
Home on the Range was initially scheduled for a 2003 release, while Brother Bear was originally slated for a spring 2004 release. However, Disney switched the release dates. Contrary to speculation, news writer Jim Hill stated the release date switch was not because Home on the Range was suffering from story rewrites, but to promote Brother Bear on the Platinum Edition release of The Lion King.

=== Home media ===
Home on the Range was released on VHS and DVD on September 14, 2004. The DVD came with an animated short, A Dairy Tale, a series of 18 little shorts called the Joke Corral, and animated intros to the DVD menu. All three featured the voice cast from the film. The film was released on Blu-ray on July 3, 2012.

== Reception ==
=== Critical reception ===
Home on the Range received mixed reviews upon release. On the review aggregation website Rotten Tomatoes, 51% of 127 critics' reviews are positive, with an average rating of 5.7/10. The website's consensus reads, "Though Home on the Range is likeable and may keep young children diverted, it's one of Disney's more middling titles, with garish visuals and a dull plot." Metacritic, which uses a weighted average, assigned the film a score of 50 out of 100, based on 30 critics, indicating "mixed or average" reviews. Audiences polled by CinemaScore gave the film an average grade of "A–" on an A+ to F scale.

Nathan Rabin, reviewing for The A.V. Club, praised the film describing it as "a sweet, raucously funny, comic Western that corrects a glaring historical injustice by finally surveying the Old West through the eyes of cows rather than cowboys." Roger Ebert of the Chicago Sun-Times gave the film 2 1/2 stars out of 4, saying that "A movie like this is fun for kids: bright, quick-paced, with broad, outrageous characters. But Home on the Range doesn't have the crossover quality of the great Disney films like Beauty and the Beast and The Lion King. And it doesn't have the freshness and originality of a more traditional movie like Lilo & Stitch. Its real future, I suspect, lies in home video. It's only 76 minutes long, but although kids will like it, their parents will be sneaking looks at their watches." Claudia Puig of USA Today wrote favorably in her review that "Home on the Range is a throwback to old Disney cartoons: fun, rather than message-laden, with broad humor and entertaining action. The cheerful, plucky characters have heart and loyalty, and that's enough to make this a worthy family-friendly animated fest." Nell Minow of Common Sense Media gave the film four out of five stars, saying that "I love it when Disney doesn't take itself too seriously. No one tried to reach for the stars or make this into a classic. Home on the Range is just a cute little story about some not-so-contented cows who save the day. It modestly aspires to be nothing more than a lot of fun, and it does that job very well."

Elvis Mitchell of The New York Times criticized the weak comedy writing that "Unrestrained energy is hardly a bad thing for animation — the best cartoons are built on the contradictory pursuit of meticulously arranged anarchy—but they never seem needy, or desperate for laughs, as Home on the Range does. The film seems hungrier for a pat on the head than a chuckle." Similarly, Los Angeles Times film critic Kenneth Turan claimed "Home on the Range may be acceptable on reflection, but its formulaic desire to mix wisecracks for adults with pratfalls for kids is feeling thin, and its overall air of frantic hysteria does not wear well either." Michael Wilmington of The Chicago Tribune noted "Satirizing the movie Western can make for a great cartoon, as it does in Jiri Trnka's brilliant 1949 Czech short Song of the Prairie, a puppet version of Stagecoach. But Home isn't good satire or good slapstick. It does have those lyrical, catchy Menken tunes, and the film perks up whenever Raitt or lang sing one of them. But much of this movie is deadly. Home keeps milking the same gags and throwing the same bull, and after a while you feel cowed watching it."

=== Box office ===
On its opening box office weekend, Home on the Range grossed about $14 million in box office estimates, opening fourth behind Scooby-Doo 2: Monsters Unleashed, Walking Tall, and Hellboy. Following the disappointing box office weekend, financial analysts predicted that Disney would be forced to write-down the production costs, which totaled more than $100 million. Following the latter release of The Alamo (2004), which also met poor box office returns, it was reported that Disney would have to write-down about $70 million. The film ended its box office run with $50 million in domestic earnings and $145.3 million worldwide.

=== Accolades ===
Award	Date of ceremony	Category	Recipient(s) and nominee(s)	Result
Annie Awards	January 30, 2005	Character Design in an Animated Feature Production	Joseph C. Moshier	Nominated
Annie Awards	January 30, 2005	Directing in an Animated Feature Production	Will Finn and John Sanford	Nominated
Annie Awards	January 30, 2005	Storyboarding in an Animated Feature Production	Chen-Yi Chang	Nominated
Young Artist Award	April 30, 2005	Best Family Feature Film - Animation	Home on the Range	Nominated

== Video game ==
A video game developed by Artificial Mind and Movement for the Game Boy Advance, titled Disney presents Home on the Range or Disney's Home on the Range depending on territory, was released by Disney Interactive Studios in 2004.

== See also ==
- List of films about horses

== Bibliography ==
- Ghez, Didier (2020). They Drew as They Pleased Vol. 6: The Hidden Art of Disney's New Golden Age. Chronicle Books. ISBN 978-1-79720-093-4.
