= Hadley Foster =

American athletic administrator

George "Hadley" Foster, (born June 18, 1975) is the American athletic administrator who was the head men's volleyball coach at Quincy University. He spent eight seasons as head coach, ranking as the program's all-time leader in wins.

== Background ==
Foster, who is from Shelley, Idaho, played high school basketball at Shelley High School. Foster's collegiate coaching experience started with a six-year stint at NCAA Division I Idaho State University, where earned both his bachelor's and master's degrees and also completing his undergraduate studies in physical education in 1996 before finishing his graduate work in athletic administration in 1998.
