= Blackhouse Records =

Independent record label based in Coeur d'Alene, Idaho

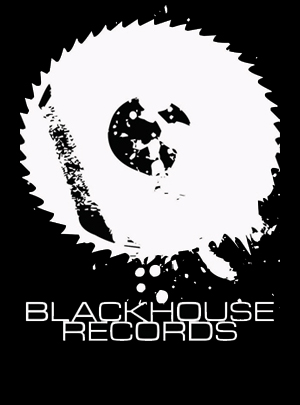
- Founded: 2000
- Founder: Scott Rozell, Tony Shields
- Distributors: Alliance Distribution (US), Cobraside Distribution (US), (UK), Southern Records/SRD (EU/Asia).
- Genre: Punk, rap, hardcore punk, alternative rock, heavy metal, trap, ambient, experimental, spoken word, blues, hip hop
- Country of origin: U.S.
- Location: Coeur d'Alene, Idaho
- Official website: blackhouserecordsinc.com

Blackhouse Records is an American independent record label founded by Scott Rozell (drummer for Moral Crux and Scatterbox), and Tony Shields. The label is based in Coeur d'Alene, Idaho and Spokane, Washington, and was originally a logo created in 2000 for the purpose of selling Scatterbox records and promoting local Inland Northwest punk rock concerts. Over the years, it has evolved into a moderate-sized independent record label. Throughout the 2000s, most of the bands on Blackhouse were punk and pop punk groups, while there are many heavy metal and rap acts signed to the label as well. Blackhouse started a short-lived imprint, "TF Media", which signed noise and grindcore bands, however they all now roll up under the Blackhouse imprint.

== History ==
=== Early years ===
Scott Rozell and Tony Shields formed Blackhouse Records in July 2000 as a vehicle for releases by the band Scatterbox. It soon became a platform for the releases of various local and regional Northwest artists.

In 2008, Blackhouse re-issued a (at the time out-of-print) spoken word release The Birth of Tragedy Magazine's FEAR POWER GOD, originally released by CFY Records (a Bay Area record label run by Oxbow frontman, Eugene S. Robinson) in the 1980s on CD format. Before this release, the compilation had never been released on the compact disc format. The album featured spoken word pieces by Henry Rollins, Charles Manson, Anton LaVey, Lydia Lunch, Allen Ginsberg, and Jello Biafra. The album was well-received, gaining the label more attention in the press and distribution world, landing them an exclusive distribution deal with the now-defunct Lumberjack/Mordam Records, a subsidiary of the Warner Music Group. The relationship was short lived due to financial woes with Lumberjack/Mordam, which caused the company to close operations.

=== Change in style ===
In 2013, the label started to stray from its traditional punk rock genre by signing metal and hip-hop acts such as Slug Christ, The Drip, The Colourflies, Rot Monger, Zan, Lord Narf, Ras Kass, Coodie Breeze, Absurdist, Prison Religion, Cold Blooded, and Nobodies.

Blackhouse went into a non-exclusive manufacturing and distribution agreement with rapper Father and his imprint, Awful Records in 2016, with the label releasing Who's Gonna Get F***ed First? and Young Hot Ebony in early 2017. This was the first time either album had been released on physical format.

In 2017 through 2018, the label was very prolific, teaming up with Nashville, Tennessee underground cassette label Candy Drips on numerous releases, shirt collaboration projects with well known blog and label DatPizz, and releasing a variety of albums ranging from hip-hop, trap, grindcore, hardcore punk, experimental and metal. The label hosted a full label showcase at the kickoff night of Northwest weekly the Inlander magazine's Volume Music Festival in 2017 with virtually all active artists on the label under one roof performing that evening.

2019 onward saw a return to more metal and punk-based genre releases with new additions from notable artists such as The Accüsed, Narrow Minded, N8NOFACE, Tender Fury, The Drip, ZAN, Sterileprayer, Oxbow front man Eugene S. Robinson & French experimental noise artist Philippe Petit, and Dirty Rotten Imbeciles vocalist Kurt Brecht (book releases). The label also entered into a distribution partnership with Southern Records/Proper Music to cover European and Asia territories.

In 2020, the label expanded operations, making the move into publishing book titles. The label has to-date released a total of seven books, ranging from coffee-table hardcover art books to both fiction and non-fiction paperback titles.

== Roster ==
- A Hollywood Legend
- Accused AD / Toe Tag (American band)
- AJ Suede
- Absurdist
- AraPacis
- Astral Bodiez
- Bird Fight
- Blacktracks
- Call Me Renegade
- Cold Blooded (Now known as Throneburner)
- Colourflies
- Coodie Breeze and Tyler Major
- Dead Country
- The Drip
- Eugene S. Robinson and Philippe Petit
- Execution Techniques
- Father (Manufacturing/Distribution Only)
- FAUS
- Fetish
- Filthy White Trash
- Gadgetor
- Honey Badger
- Infrablaster
- Jamo Gang
- Johnny J & The Flat Foot Floogies
- Jordan Isaiah
- Kurt Brecht (of Dirty Rotten Imbeciles)
- Lil Percy
- Lord Narf
- Moral Crux
- Narrow Minded
- N8NOFACE
- Nobodies
- Oxbow
- Phantom Limb Management (US Distribution Only)
- Prison Religion
- Ras Kass
- Rot Monger
- Rozz Dyliams
- Sadie Hawkins Rejects
- Scatterbox
- SEAN
- Seizure
- Slug Christ
- Snakes/Sermons
- Sterileprayer
- Sugar Skulls
- Tender Fury
- Thoed Myndez
- Virginia Slim
- Zan
- Zepar (band)|Zepar

== See also ==
- List of record labels
