= Grace High School =

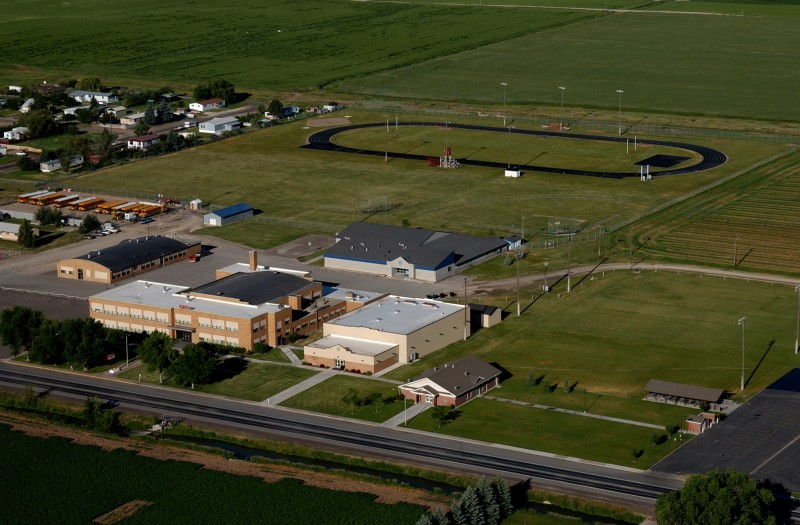
- Aerial view of campus

Location
- 704 South Main Street; Grace, Idaho 83241; United States
- Coordinates: 42°34′13″N 111°43′52″W

Information
- Type: Public
- Established: 1953
- School district: Grace J.S.D.
- Principal: Brandon Jackson
- Teaching staff: 18.13 (on an FTE basis)
- Grades: 7-12
- Enrollment: 233 (2023–2024)
- Student to teacher ratio: 12.83
- Colors: Red and white
- Mascot: Grizzly
- Newspaper: The Grizzly Growl
- IHSAA Division: 1A-D1
- Website: ghs.sd148.org

Grace High School is the public secondary school in Grace, Idaho, southeast of Pocatello. It serves grades 7-12 for the Grace Joint School District.

== Academics ==
In the 2022-23 US News and World Report annual survey of US public high schools, Grace ranked 37th in Idaho and 6,932nd in the country. The school is accredited by the Northwest Association of Schools and Colleges.

== Athletics ==
The high school supports American football, basketball (boys and girls), volleyball, track & field, golf, and cross country. The high school's mascot is the Grizzlies; it was formerly the Red Devils until 1978. School colors are red, white, and gray. The school's football field/track is named Roswell Field, and the gymnasium is named Greenwood Gymnasium.

== Notable people ==
- Dick Motta - National Basketball Association (NBA) head basketball coach; his first head coaching job was at Grace, where he won a state championship.
- Phil Johnson - NCAA men's basketball coach
