= Edward L. Curtis =

American statesman (1858–1890)

8th Secretary of the Territory of Idaho
- In office March 3, 1883 – February 7, 1884
- Appointed by: Chester A. Arthur
- Preceded by: Theodore F. Singiser
- Succeeded by: D. P. B. Pride

Private Secretary to the Governor of the Territory of Idaho
- In office 1873–1874
- Governor: Thomas W. Bennett

Personal details
- Born: April 21, 1858 Weaverville, California, U.S.
- Died: January 9, 1890 (aged 31) Boise, Territory of Idaho, U.S.
- Party: Republican
- Parent: Edward J. Curtis
- Education: Columbia Law School (did not graduate)

Edward L. Curtis (April 21, 1858 — January 9, 1890) was an American statesman, lawyer, pioneer, and frontiersman who served as Idaho's territorial secretary from 1883 to 1884.

== Background and education ==
Curtis was born to Edward J. Curtis and his wife, Susan L. Frost, on April 21, 1858, in Weaverville, California; he spent the majority of his early childhood there, in addition to San Francisco. His father at the time was a local politician who had served as a member of the California State Assembly from 1854 to 1856.

In the autumn of 1865, Curtis moved with his family to Boise which was then a part of the Idaho Territory. He remained there for two years before relocating to Oregon for school, where he resided for nearly fifteen months before returning.

In 1875, he moved to Maryland to attend a local college there; he would stay for two years prior to leaving for New York, where he became a clerk at a local post office.

In October 1880, he attended Columbia Law School, but was unable to finish his education reportedly due to poor health, causing him to return West on January 31, 1881. He would arrive in California via the Isthmus of Panama, and spent some time there for a brief period, before making his homecoming to Idaho.

== Political career ==
Curtis's career in politics started in 1870/71, upon being elected page for the Idaho Territorial Legislature during its sixth session. Later, at just 14 years old, in 1873, he was appointed as Private Secretary to the territorial governor at the time, Thomas W. Bennett, and continued in this role during the Legislature's seventh and eighth sessions.

On March 5, 1883, he was appointed territorial secretary, a role his father had previously filled from 1869 to 1878. He was also elected Enrolling Clerk of Idaho's twelfth territorial Legislative Assembly that same year, and would additionally go on to fill the role of acting governor.

== Illness and death ==
Sometime in the late 1880s, Curtis contracted tuberculosis, and would end up dying of it on January 9, 1890, in Boise. He was 31, and was survived by both of his parents and all three of his siblings.
