= Slug Christ =

American singer, rapper and record producer

- Also known as: Chaz Bell; H \ p s; Slugga; Slug Messiah
- Born: Charles Paul Bell; March 3, 1991 (age 35); Atlanta, Georgia, U.S.
- Genres: Cloud rap; mathcore (early)
- Occupations: Singer; rapper; record producer
- Instruments: Vocals; digital audio workstation
- Years active: 2007–present
- Labels: Awful; Blackhouse

Charles Paul “Chaz” Bell (born March 3, 1991), known professionally as Slug Christ (stylized as Slug † Christ), is an American singer, rapper and record producer from Atlanta, Georgia. He is currently signed to Awful Records and Blackhouse Records.

== Biography ==
Bell attended Savannah College of Art and Design, where he studied painting. He began his musical career performing as a vocalist in the mathcore band An Isle Ate Her. The band released one full-length and one EP and played in support for successful acts such as Chelsea Grin during their run. The band eventually broke up and Bell pursued making beats and rapping over them after being introduced to the Internet rap scene from a friend of An Isle Ate Her's bass player.

After emerging in 2013 with a collection of Slugged Out remixes, he would later join Awful Records and the Wild Hogs and go on to release his debut album, entitled Crucifixion of Rapper Extraordinaire, in 2015.

His lyrical content usually addresses themes about depression, drug use, and religion.

== Discography ==
=== Extended plays ===
- Agathokakological (2007)
- 90's Toy Commercial (2009)
- All the Girls I Know All of Them (2010)
- Youth on Pills (2011)
- Slug † Christ ft Lil Pool Boi (2011)
- Slug Swell (2011)
- S.O.S. (with Silky Johnson) (2013)
- Sluggahm (with Gahm) (2014)
- Plant Mentality (2014)
- Iglesia: Olde Testament (2014)
- I Feel the Sadness in My Legs and the Happy in My Head (2014)
- An Appointment with Hector (with LuiDiamonds) (2015)
- Girlfriend (with Ethereal) (2015)
- Jesus Wept (with Little Pain) (2015)
- Salted Slug (with DJ Smokey) (2015)
- Ultima! (with Ethereal) (2015)
- Sometimes Even the Moonlight Hurt My Eyes (2016)
- Autoyurnt (with Lord Narf) (2016)
- It's Colder at the Bottom of the Shower (2017)
- A Part of Me Dies With You (2020)
- Saint Charles (2025)

=== Mixtapes ===
- So, Childish (2010)
- H \ p s (2012)
- Goat Eyes (2012)
- Lil' Trapsters Vol 1: Get Out of the Trap You Fuck Boi (with Lambo Beach) (2012)
- EDEA (with Dudes) (2013)
- Slugged Out (2013)
- Genocide (2014)
- The Crucifixion of Rapper Extraordinaire, Slug Christ (2015)
- God Is Under the Porch Where the Dog Died (2015)
- Plant Mentality 2 (2015)
- The Demiurge (2016)
- Judas' Betrayal and the Three Day Burial of a Salted Slug (2018)
- Deep Unlearning (2019)
- Inner Worm, Inner God (with Foxwedding) (2020)
- Plant Mentality 3 (2021)
- Plant Mentality 4 (2024)
