= Shelley, Idaho =

City in Bingham County, Idaho, United States

- City
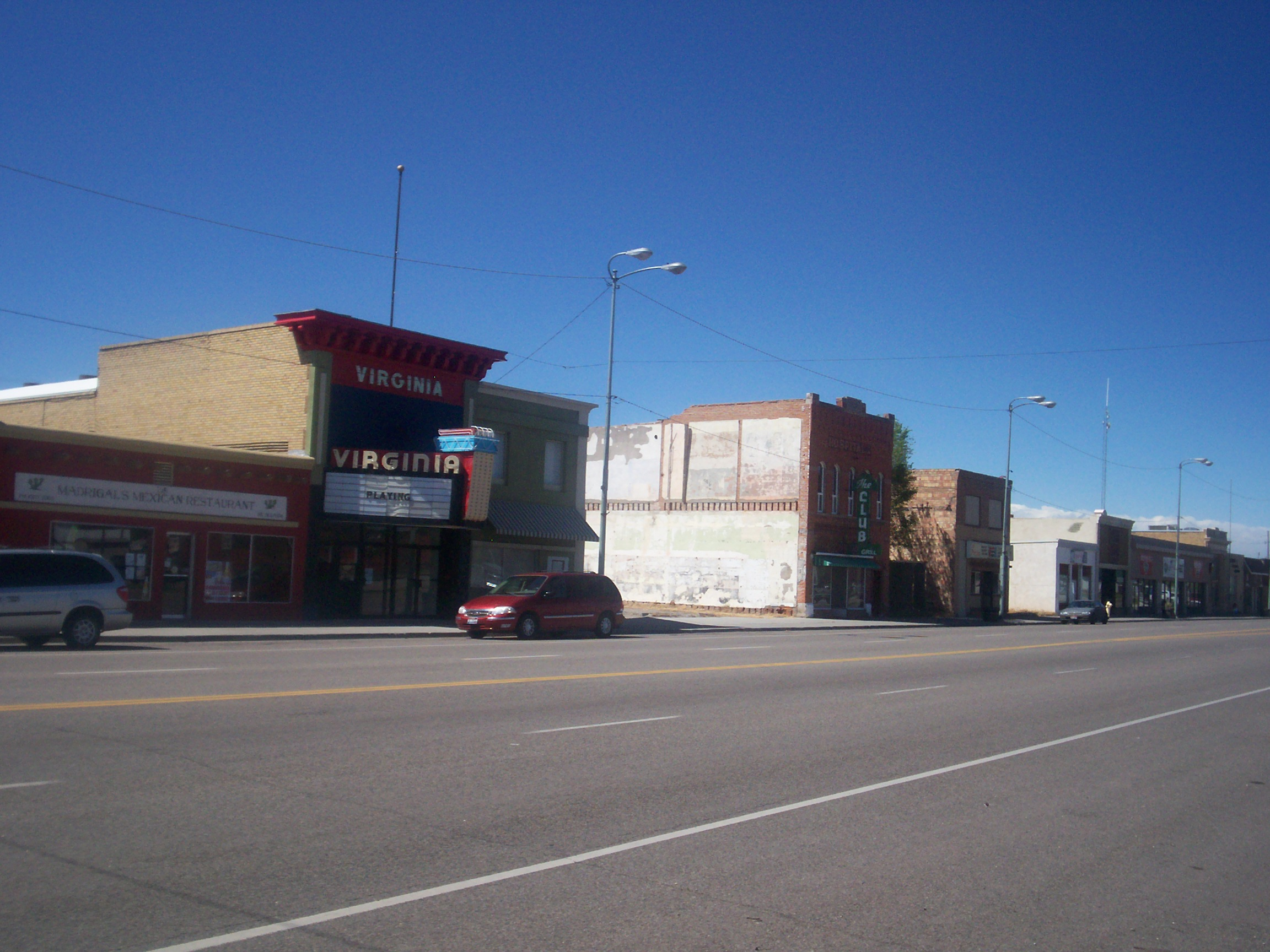
- North State Street (U.S. Route 91) in Shelley, June 2008

- Location of Shelley in Bingham County, Idaho.
- Coordinates: 43°22′40″N 112°07′30″W
- Country: United States
- State: Idaho
- County: Bingham

Area
  - Total: 1.81 sq mi (4.68 km^{2})
  - Land: 1.81 sq mi (4.68 km^{2})
  - Water: 0 sq mi (0.00 km^{2})
- Elevation: 4,629 ft (1,411 m)

Population (2020)
  - Total: 4,785
  - Density: 2,650/sq mi (1,020/km^{2})
- Time zone: UTC-7 (Mountain (MST))
  - Summer (DST): UTC-6 (MDT)
- ZIP code: 83274
- Area codes: 208, 986
- FIPS code: 16-73450
- GNIS feature ID: 2411881
- Website: cityofshelley.org

Shelley is a city in Bingham County, Idaho, United States. The population was 4,785 at the 2020 census.

Since 1927, Shelley has been home to the "Idaho Annual Spud Day", which is celebrated on the 3rd Saturday of September. It typically features a parade, live bands, a Spud Tug, a spud-picking contest, and free baked potatoes.

== History ==
Shelley was established in 1904 It was named for John F. Shelley, who moved to the area in 1892 He'd moved to the area intending to open a small store, and needed lumber and other supplies to build it Since the site was some distance from the nearest existing community, he asked the railroad company to make a special stop to offload the supplies he'd ordered They consented, provided he could offload the supplies in under 20 minutes His daughter, Lottie, wrote the following in her personal history:

With the help of Chris Mickelson and others, the lumber was thrown off the train on both sides of the track Later a spur was put in here by the railroad company.

Now they needed a name for the town. Mother suggested 'Shelco'; Father said, 'Shelton,' so they drew cuts and Mother won."

Shelco was submitted to the railroad company and they replied: 'Call your town what you wish, but we have already named the spur, Shelley ' That is how the town got its name.

— Charlotte Shelley,

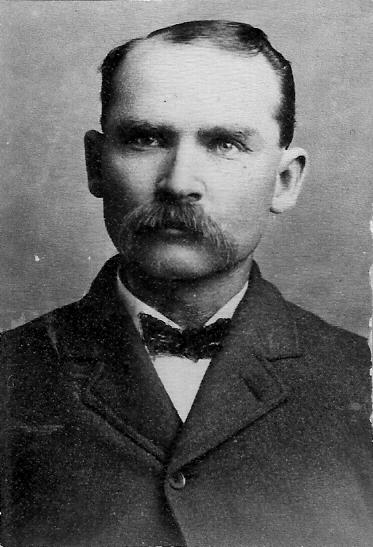
John F. Shelley

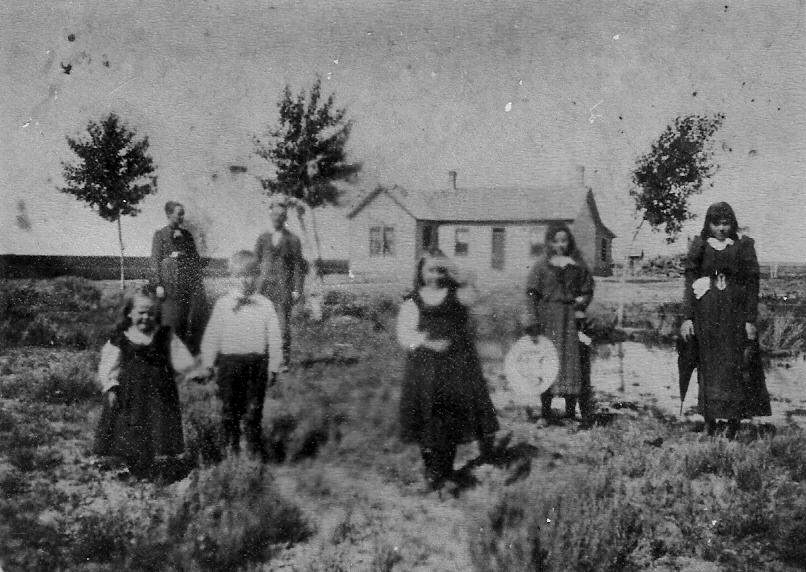
John F. Shelley and his wife stand in the background. In the foreground are the rest of his family: Mary, Tom, Charlotte (Lottie), Docia, and Hannah Davis

On September 4, 1902 a large fire destroyed seven buildings on State Street Only two buildings, a general merchandise store and Nalder's furniture store, were saved Soren Yorgesen, a local Justice of the Peace and proprietor of the first hotel in Shelley recounts the experience as follows:

...One windy afternoon in the heat of the summer, a fire started in a small grocery store operated by James Jensen It did not take long until the wind was fanning a flame that wiped out quite a long string of frame buildings - two saloons, restaurant, Odd Fellows Hall, Post Office and Confectionery, Grocery Store, and dwelling.

— Soren Yorgesen,

== Geography ==
According to the United States Census Bureau, the city has a total area of 1.81 square miles (4.69 km^{2}), all of it land.

Shelley is located on the eastern side of the Snake River, facing the Blackfoot Mountains.

=== Greenbelt ===
Beginning at the fire department, across the street from Shelley High School, lies the Shelley Greenbelt. This fully paved trail, a collaborative project between Shelley and Bingham County, follows the Snake River for 2 miles before terminating at North Bingham County Park. The trail includes picnic tables, benches, and activities for families throughout.

== Idaho Annual Spud Day ==
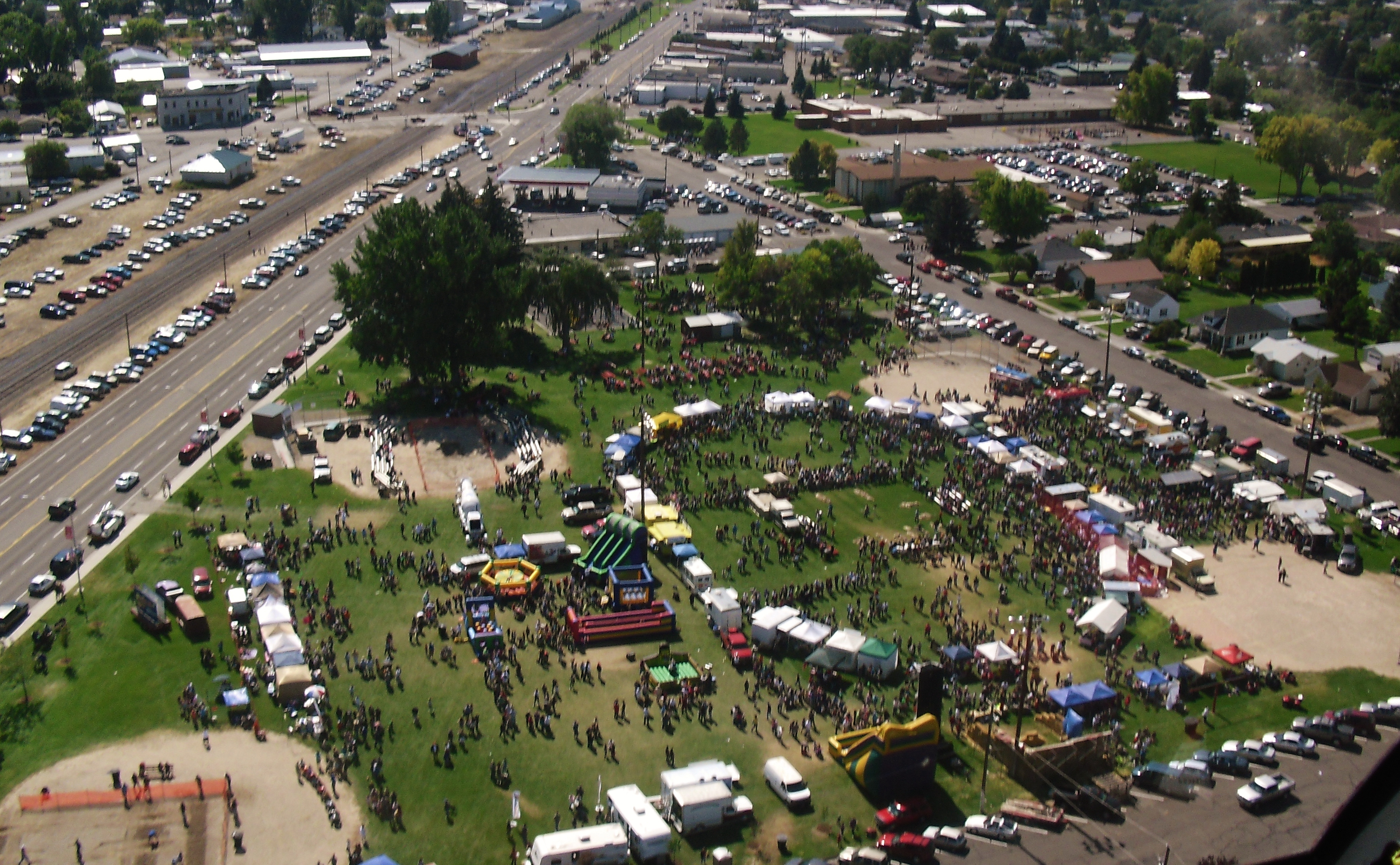
The annual Spud Day Potato Festival at the Shelley City Park attracts thousands as seen from a helicopter in September 2011.

In September 1927, Shelley hosted its first Spud Day (Now called The Idaho Spud Day), now a yearly tradition usually taking place on the third Saturday each September. During this first Spud day, 10,000 people were served hot baked potatoes with butter. This tradition continues each year, along with several other events. These events have included a parade that features the various clubs and bands of the schools in the area, as well as local businesses and groups. Other events include the spud tug - where teams play a game of tug of war over a pit of mashed potatoes blended in a cement truck, spud run - a set of 1-mile and 5k races, concerts, fairground booths and games, and a demolition derby hosted at nearby North Bingham County Park. This event is usually the beginning of Spud Harvest, a 2-week break from school to allow students to assist in the season's potato harvest.

== Demographics ==
Historical population
Census	Pop.	Note	%±
1910	537		—
1920	1,223		127.7%
1930	1,447		18.3%
1940	1,751		21.0%
1950	1,856		6.0%
1960	2,612		40.7%
1970	2,614		0.1%
1980	3,300		26.2%
1990	3,536		7.2%
2000	3,813		7.8%
2010	4,409		15.6%
2020	4,785		8.5%
U.S. Decennial Census

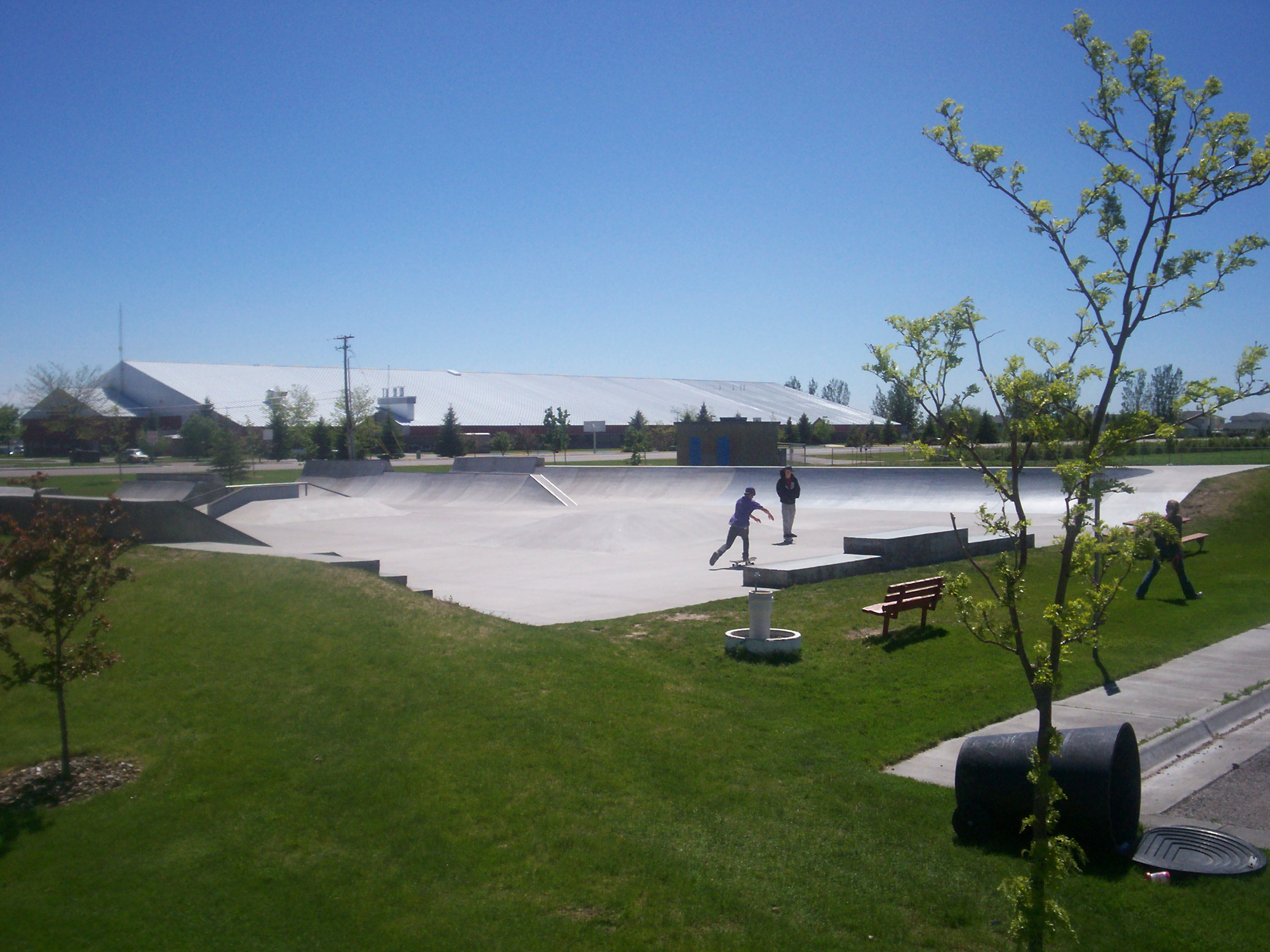
Curt Brinkman Park features a skateboarding park that was created by James Simpson in 1994. Shelley High School is in the background.

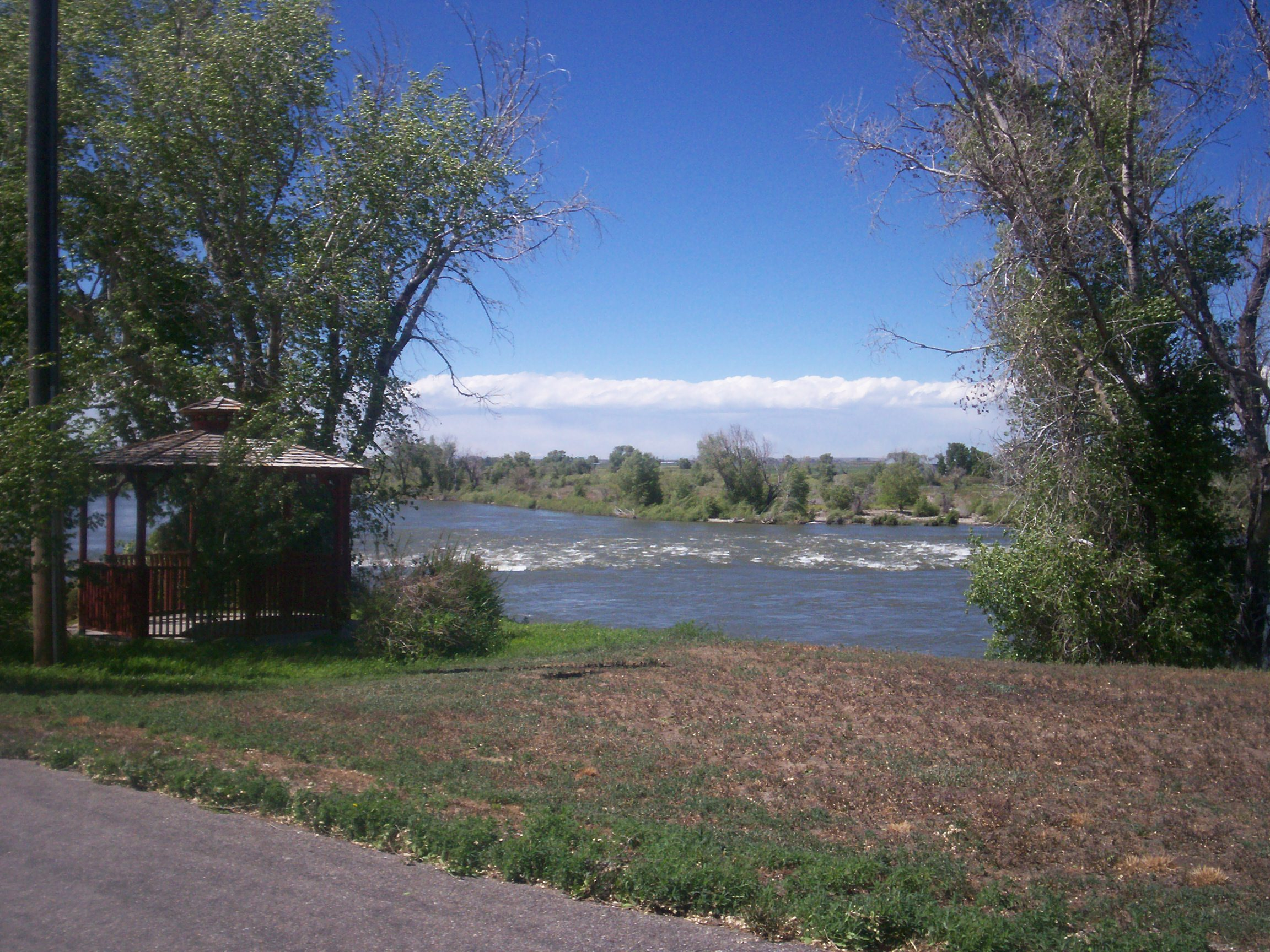
A gazebo on the greenbelt in Shelley, ID overlooks the Snake River as it flows over some rocks. This gazebo was destroyed in 2009.

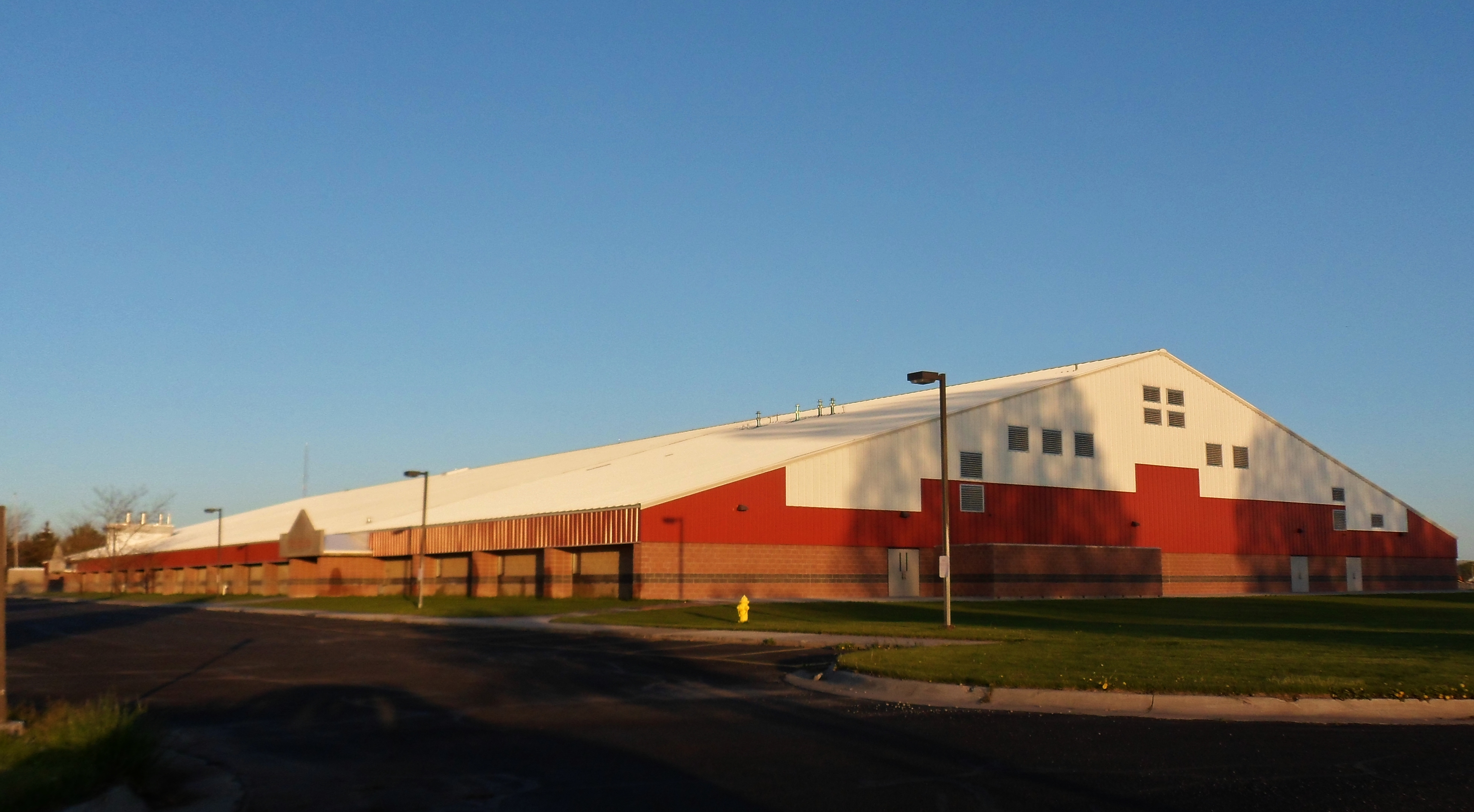
Shelley High School, nicknamed 'the Spud Cellar', houses the community's 600 high school students.

=== 2020 census ===
As of the 2020 census, Shelley had a population of 4,785 The median age was 30.6 years 33.2% of residents were under the age of 18, and 12.2% of residents were 65 years of age or older For every 100 females there were 92.9 males, and for every 100 females age 18 and over there were 87.2 males age 18 and over.

100.0% of residents lived in urban areas, while 0.0% lived in rural areas.

There were 1,560 households in Shelley, of which 44.1% had children under the age of 18 living in them Of all households, 57.8% were married-couple households, 13.0% were households with a male householder and no spouse or partner present, and 25.3% were households with a female householder and no spouse or partner present About 22.1% of all households were made up of individuals and 7.6% had someone living alone who was 65 years of age or older.

There were 1,619 housing units, of which 3.6% were vacant. The homeowner vacancy rate was 0.5%, and the rental vacancy rate was 4.8%.

Racial composition as of the 2020 census Race! Number Percent
White	3,956	82.7%
Black or African American	22	0.5%
American Indian and Alaska Native	55	1.1%
Asian	24	0.5%
Native Hawaiian and Other Pacific Islander	0	0.0%
Some other race	346	7.2%
Two or more races	382	8.0%
Hispanic or Latino (of any race)	736	15.4%

=== 2010 census ===
As of the census of 2010, there were 4,409 people, 1,445 households, and 1,123 families residing in the city The population density was 2,435.9 inhabitants per square mile (940.5/km^{2}). There were 1,531 housing units at an average density of 845.9 per square mile (326.6/km^{2}) The racial makeup of the city was 89.0% White, 0.3% African American, 0.8% Native American, 0.7% Asian, 0.2% Pacific Islander, 7.0% from other races, and 2.1% from two or more races Hispanic or Latino of any race were 14.0% of the population.

There were 1,445 households, of which 49.1% had children under the age of 18 living with them, 61.6% were married couples living together, 12.1% had a female householder with no husband present, 4.0% had a male householder with no wife present, and 22.3% were non-families 19.6% of all households were made up of individuals, and 7.1% had someone living alone who was 65 years of age or older The average household size was 3.05 and the average family size was 3.53.

The median age in the city was 27.8 years 36.1% of residents were under the age of 18; 9.6% were between the ages of 18 and 24; 25.6% were from 25 to 44; 19.2% were from 45 to 64; and 9.5% were 65 years of age or older. The gender makeup of the city was 49.4% male and 50.6% female.

=== 2000 census ===
As of the census of 2000, there were 3,813 people, 1,201 households, and 989 families residing in the city The population density was 2,884.5 inhabitants per square mile (1,113.7/km^{2}). There were 1,253 housing units at an average density of 947.9 per square mile (366.0/km^{2}) The racial makeup of the city was 89.93% White, 0.18% African American, 0.68% Native American, 0.26% Asian, 0.03% Pacific Islander, 6.74% from other races, and 2.18% from two or more races Hispanic or Latino of any race were 11.78% of the population.

There were 1,201 households, out of which 48.9% had children under the age of 18 living with them, 67.0% were married couples living together, 13.0% had a female householder with no husband present, and 17.6% were non-families 15.3% of all households were made up of individuals, and 7.2% had someone living alone who was 65 years of age or older The average household size was 3.14 and the average family size was 3.50.

In the city, the population was spread out, with 35.6% under the age of 18, 11.5% from 18 to 24, 25.5% from 25 to 44, 16.8% from 45 to 64, and 10.6% who were 65 years of age or older The median age was 27 years For every 100 females, there were 96.2 males For every 100 females age 18 and over, there were 90.3 males.

The median income for a household in the city was $39,318. The median income for a family was $41,223 Males had a median income of $32,154 versus $20,121 for females The per capita income for the city was $13,921 About 7.9% of families and 9.6% of the population were below the poverty line, including 10.6% of those under age 18 and 2.0% of those age 65 or over.

== Notable people ==
- Lavina Fielding Anderson, LDS scholar and author
- Curt Brinkman, Paralympic athlete
- Lewis Croft, actor
- Brad Daw, member of the Utah House of Representatives
- Dan Dockstader, President, Wyoming State Senate
- Hadley Foster, men's college volleyball coach
- Maxine Hanks, theologian, historian, author, "September Six"
- Ogden Kraut, religious author
- John L. Moore, former state senator
- Darwin Young, former member of the Idaho House of Representatives

== See also ==
- List of cities in Idaho
