= Phil Johnson (basketball, born 1941) =

American basketball player and coach

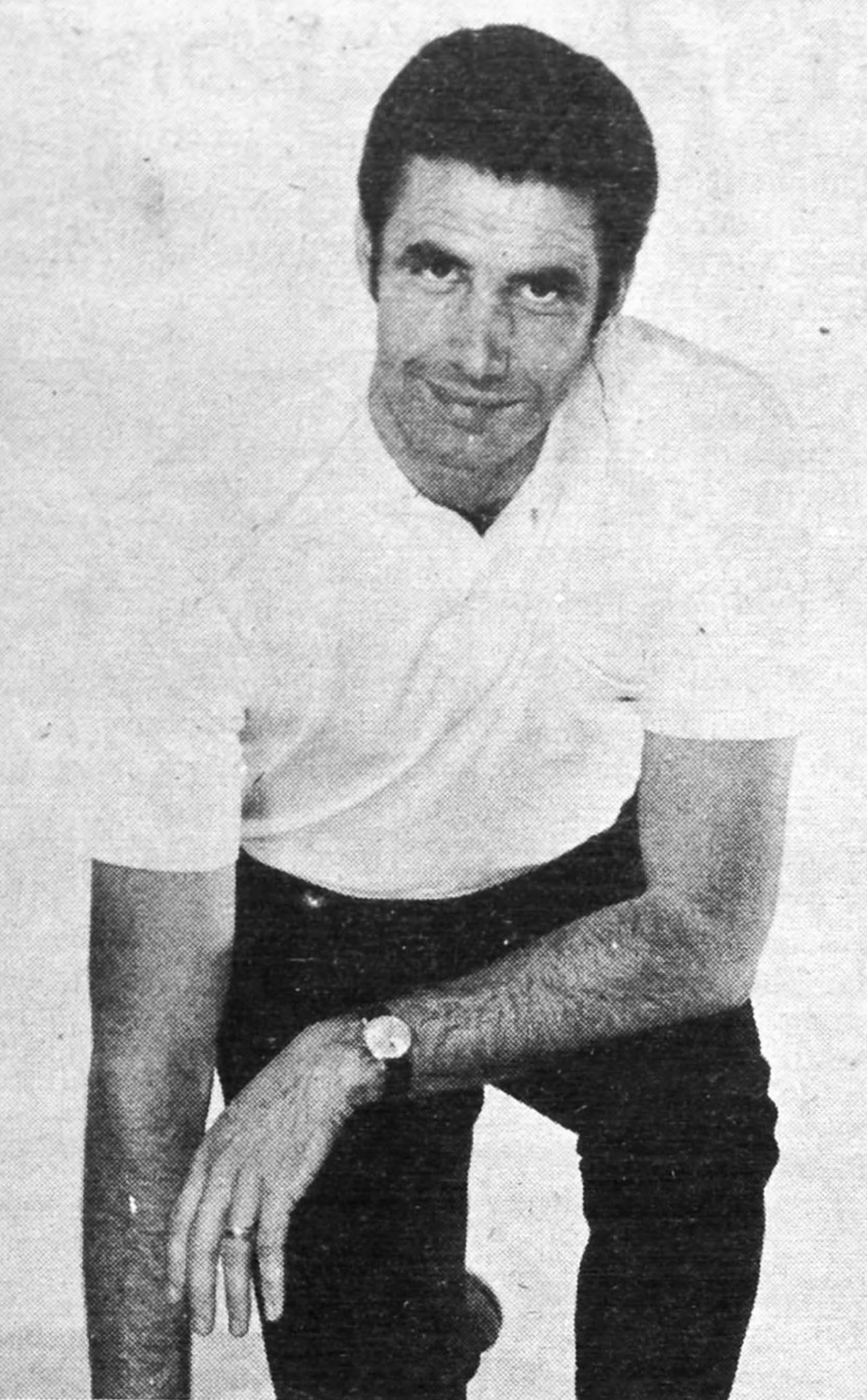
- Johnson in 1969

Personal information
- Born: September 6, 1941 (age 85) Grace, Idaho, U.S.
- Listed height: 6 ft 5 in (1.96 m)
- Listed weight: 180 lb (82 kg)

Career information
- High school: Grace (Grace, Idaho)
- College: Weber State (1960–1961); Utah State (1961–1963)
- NBA draft: 1963: undrafted
- Coaching career: 1963–2011

Career history

Coaching
- 1963–1964: Utah State (freshmen)
- 1964–1968: Weber State (assistant)
- 1968–1971: Weber State
- 1971–1973: Chicago Bulls (assistant)
- 1973–1978: Kansas City-Omaha/Kansas City Kings
- 1979–1982: Chicago Bulls (assistant)
- 1982: Chicago Bulls (interim)
- 1982–1984: Utah Jazz (assistant)
- 1984–1988: Kansas City/Sacramento Kings
- 1988–2011: Utah Jazz (assistant)

Career highlights
- As head coach: NBA Coach of the Year (1975); 3× Big Sky regular season (1969–1971); 3× Big Sky Coach of the Year (1969–1971); As assistant coach: 3× Big Sky regular season (1965, 1966, 1968)

Philip Donald Johnson (born September 6, 1941) is an American former professional basketball coach. He played college basketball for the Weber State Wildcats and Utah State Aggies. Johnson began his coaching career with the Aggies in 1963 and then returned to the Wildcats where he was an assistant coach from 1964 to 1968 and head coach from 1968 to 1971. He coached in the National Basketball Association (NBA) from 1971 to 2011 including stints as the head coach for the Kansas City-Omaha/Kansas City Kings from 1973 to 1978, the Chicago Bulls in 1982 and the Kansas City/Sacramento Kings from 1984 to 1988.

== Early life ==
Philip Donald Johnson was born on September 6, 1941, in Grace, Idaho. He attended Grace High School, where he excelled in basketball. In his senior year of 1959, under head coach Dick Motta, the team went 24-2 and won the Idaho state championship.

== College career ==
Johnson attended Utah State University for one year before transferring to Weber College (now Weber State University) in Ogden, Utah, where he played on the Wildcats basketball team for one season. In 1961, Johnson returned to Utah State University and played two years on the Utah State Aggies basketball team. Playing under coach LaDell Andersen, Johnson was part of Utah State teams that made the NCAA tournaments of 1962 and 1963. Johnson averaged 12.3 points and 7.1 rebounds in his senior season and graduated from Utah State in 1963 with a B.S. in physical education, and in 1964 he completed his master's degree.

== Coaching career ==
=== Utah State (1963–1964) ===
Johnson began his coaching career in the 1963–64 season as the freshman basketball team coach at Utah State.

=== Weber State (1964–1971) ===
In 1964, Johnson returned to his junior college alma mater, by then Weber State College, as an assistant coach under Dick Motta. In four seasons with Johnson as an assistant, Weber State finished at the top of the Big Sky Conference in 1965, 1966, and 1968 and made the 1968 NCAA Tournament.

In 1968, Johnson became head coach at Weber State. In three seasons with Johnson as head coach, Weber State was Big Sky regular season champions every season and made every NCAA tournament from 1969 to 1971. The Big Sky also recognized Johnson as Coach of the Year in those seasons, as well. Johnson left Weber State with a 68–16 record.

=== Chicago Bulls (1971–1973) ===
In his first NBA coaching job, Johnson again joined Dick Motta's coaching staff in 1971 with the Chicago Bulls.

=== Kansas City-Omaha/Kansas City Kings (1973–1978) ===
On November 29, 1973, the Kansas City-Omaha Kings hired Johnson as new head coach after firing Bob Cousy. Inheriting a 6–19 team, Johnson went 27–31 for the rest of the season, and the Kings finished 33–49. The following season, Johnson led the Kings a 44–38 record and a berth in the 1975 NBA Playoffs. For this achievement, Johnson earned the 1975 NBA Coach of the Year Award. Johnson was fired on January 7, 1978, following a 13–24 start for the now Kansas City Kings.

=== Chicago Bulls (1979–1982) ===
In 1979, Johnson returned to the Chicago Bulls, this time as an assistant coach on Jerry Sloan's staff. When Sloan was fired, Phil completed the year as Rod Thorn's assistant.

=== Utah Jazz (1982–1984) ===
On July 20, 1982, Johnson joined Frank Layden's staff on the Utah Jazz and would serve as an assistant coach for two seasons.

=== Kansas City/Sacramento Kings (1984–1988) ===
On November 30, 1984, the Kansas City Kings hired Johnson as head coach, after Jack McKinney resigned following a 1–8 start. The Kings finished the 1984–85 season 31–51. The Kings then moved to Sacramento, California, and Johnson coached the Kings' first two seasons in Sacramento. The team made the playoffs the first season. Following a 14–32 start, in the second year, the Kings fired Johnson on February 9, 1987. This was the second time the team fired Johnson from the head coaching position.

=== Utah Jazz (1988–2011) ===
Johnson was an assistant coach with the Utah Jazz from December 11, 1988, until his resignation on February 10, 2011. During his stint with the Jazz, he was named the NBA's top assistant coach four times by an annual survey of NBA general managers (2002, 2004, 2007, 2010).

== Post-playing career ==
In 1992, Johnson was inducted into the Weber State University Sports Hall of Fame. In 2011, he was inducted into the Utah Sports Hall of Fame. On July 12, 2016, Johnson was awarded the inaugural Tex Winter Assistant Coach Lifetime Impact Award by the NBA Coach's Association. Utah State University inducted him into the Athletic Hall of Fame on September 4, 2016.

== Head coaching record ==
=== college basketball ===
Record table
Season	Team	Overall	Conference	Standing	Postseason
Weber State Wildcats (Big Sky Conference) (1968–1971)
1968–69	Weber State	27–3	15–0	1st	NCAA Sweet Sixteen
1969–70	Weber State	20–7	12–3	1st	NCAA First Round
1970–71	Weber State	21–6	12–2	1st	NCAA First Round
Weber State:		68–16 (.810)	29–5 (.853)		
Total:		68–16 (.810)			
National champion Postseason invitational champion Conference regular season champion Conference regular season and conference tournament champion Division regular season champion Division regular season and conference tournament champion Conference tournament champion

=== NBA ===
Team	Year	G	W	L	W–L%	Finish	PG	PW	PL	PW–L%	Result
Kansas City–Omaha	1973–74	58	27	31	.466	4th in Midwest	—	—	—	—	
Kansas City–Omaha	1974–75	82	44	38	.537	2nd in Midwest	6	2	4	.333	Lost in Conference semifinals
Kansas City	1975–76	82	31	51	.378	3rd in Midwest	—	—	—	—	
Kansas City	1976–77	82	40	42	.488	4th in Midwest	—	—	—	—	
Kansas City	1977–78	37	13	24	–	fired mid-season	—	—	—	—	
Chicago	1981–82	1	0	1	–	interim	—	—	—	—	
Kansas City	1984–85	73	30	43	.411	6th in Midwest	—	—	—	—	
Sacramento	1985–86	82	37	45	.451	5th in Midwest	3	0	3	.000	Lost in First Round
Sacramento	1986–87	46	14	32	.304	Fired mid-season	—	—	—	—	
Career		543	236	307	.435		9	2	7	.222	

== Personal life ==
Johnson and his wife, Ann, are the parents of two children, Mitchel and Nathan, and have two grandchildren, McKenna and Alexander. They reside in suburban Salt Lake City.
