= Lewis Croft =

American actor (1919–2008)

- Born: May 2, 1919; Shelley, Idaho, U.S.
- Died: April 29, 2008 (aged 88); Shelley, Idaho, U.S.
- Other name: Idaho Lewis
- Occupation: Actor
- Spouse(s): Delores Rodriguez (1948–1978); Eva Arwin (1984–2008)

Lewis Allen Croft (May 2, 1919 – April 29, 2008) was an American actor with dwarfism, best known for his role as a Munchkin soldier in the 1939 film The Wizard of Oz.

== Life and career ==
Croft was born in Shelley, Idaho on May 2, 1919, to Samuel and Roseland Crofts. He was buried in Shelley's Hillcrest Cemetery. Growing up in a large family, he was the fourth of 14 children. He left home when he turned 16 to work in circuses and sideshows under the stage name "Idaho Lewis" in order to support himself and his other siblings. Shortly after, he was offered a role in The Wizard of Oz as one of the Munchkin soldiers, which he accepted.

After his work as a Munchkin on The Wizard of Oz, he continued to tour at fairs, before working in a "midget" bar.

Croft married his first wife Delores Del Rio in 1948, and returned to his hometown of Shelley, Idaho in 1953 to raise a family. Delores died in 1978, and five years later Croft married his second wife, Eva Arwin.

In his later life he appeared at many Wizard of Oz events along with several of the other surviving actors who portrayed Munchkins in the film. Ill health later prevented Croft from attending such events such as the laying of the Munchkins' star on the Hollywood Walk of Fame in November 2007 after needing to use a wheelchair full-time. His last public appearance was at the 2006 Wizard of Oz Festival in Chesterton.

Croft died on April 29, 2008.
