= Ella D. Crawford =

- Born: Martha Ella Donelson (or Donaldson); November 16, 1852; Baraboo, Wisconsin, U.S.
- Died: January 20, 1932; Hot Springs, South Dakota, U.S.
- Occupation: temperance movement community organizer
- Organizations: Woman's Christian Temperance Union
- Spouse: William Oliver Crawford (m. 1878; died 1914)
- Children: 4

Ella D. Crawford (née Donelson; November 16, 1852 – January 20, 1932) was an American temperance movement community organizer affiliated with the Woman's Christian Temperance Union (W.C.T.U.). She served as president of various county, district, and local Unions in Minnesota and Iowa before being elected president of the South Idaho W.C.T.U.

== Early life and education ==
Martha Ella Donelson (or Donaldson) was born at Baraboo, Wisconsin, November 16, 1852. John Riley Donelson (1820-1859) and Margaret Ann (nee Waddell) (1828-1905). Crawford's siblings were James, John, James, Minerva, Anna, Robert, and William. In 1854, her parents removed from Baraboo to Lyndon, Juneau County, Wisconsin.

She received her early education in the public schools, and from 1864 to 1868 attended a private school.

Beginning early in life, Crawdord was an ardent advocate of the temperance cause. In 1867, at the age of 15, she became affiliated with the Independent Order of Good Templars and, later, joined the Mendotas (temperance society), in both of which organizations she held various offices. She was one of the early Crusaders, having begun her endeavors along the lines of temperance reform as early as 1873, when with others, she drove long distances, and solicited from every settler in Rock County signatures to a petition against licensing saloons in the county.

== Career ==
At the age of 16 and for the next ten years, she taught in the public schools of Juneau County, Wisconsin, Adams County, Wisconsin, and Rock County, Minnesota.

In 1880, she became a member of the W.C.T.U., and in 1882, she organized and fostered a Band of Hope among the children of Rock County, Minnesota, one of the first attempts along juvenile lines made during that period. In the summer of 1884, she also organized there a branch of the W.C.T.U., of which organization she served for three years as president. Later, she was elected president of a branch of the same body at Sheldon, Iowa, and assisted in the foundation of a similar section at Doon, Iowa.

In June, 1901, at the Fifth District Convention of the Minnesota W.C.T.U., which was held at Pipestone, she was chosen district president, serving in this capacity for several years. She further carried out her program of organization by founding another branch of the Union at Beaver Creek, Minnesota, in May 1902.

Crawford was sent as a delegate to the World’s and National W.C.T.U. Conventions at Chicago in 1893, to the National Convention at Saint Paul in 1898, and to the Fort Worth Convention in 1902. She also attended the State Conventions of Idaho and Minnesota which were held during these years. At the Boise Convention of South Idaho, in 1903, she was elected president of the South Idaho W.C.T.U., serving until 1904. During the ensuing twenty years, although holding no official position, Crawford continued to be a zealous worker in the Union.

She was the originator of a unique W.C.T.U. chart showing the systematic and direct relation of all of the 40 different departments of work to the home as the hub or center of all efforts.

== Personal life ==
In 1878, at Luverne, Minnesota, she married William Oliver Crawford (1845-1914), a graduate of the University of Michigan Law School at Ann Arbor, Michigan. Their children were, Calla, Margaret, Paul, and Alice.

She was a resident of Minnesota from 1873 and was the first woman in that State to be baptized in the Rock River. In November, 1875, she became a member of the Baptist Church at Luverne.

From 1925, she lived in Sioux Falls, South Dakota.

Ella D. Crawford died January 20, 1932, in Hot Springs, South Dakota, where she was wintering.
