= Scatterbox =

American punk rock band

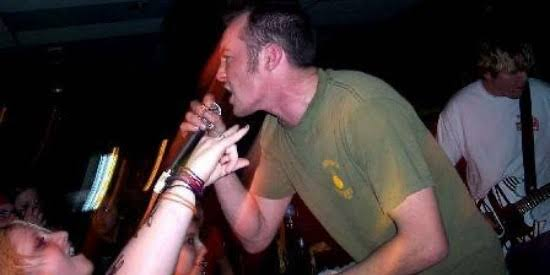
- Scatterbox playing live in Seattle, WA.

Background information
- Origin: Coeur d'Alene, Idaho, U.S.
- Genres: Punk Rock; Hardcore Punk; Thrash Metal
- Years active: 2001–present
- Labels: Clickpop Records, Rebel Alliance, Troma FIlms, Rykodisc, Crash Assailant Records, Blackhouse Records
- Formerly of: Moral Crux, Green Jelly, Intifada
- Members: Mark Cogburn; Scott Rozell; Sean Nicol; Ryan White; Tom White
- Past members: Dan Stamper; Jared Brown; Chris Copulos; Sean Nicol; Justin Smith
- Website: Scatterbox Instagram

Scatterbox is an American punk rock band from Coeur d'Alene, Idaho. Formed in 2001, the current lineup includes Tom White (vocals), Scott Rozell (drums), Mark Cogburn (guitar), Ryan White (bass), and Sean Nicol (guitar). They are currently signed with Blackhouse Records of Spokane, Washington. Scatterbox has released six full-length albums (including one live record), and three EPs, and a documentary film. The band is regarded as the longest-standing consistently active punk rock band from the state of Idaho.

== Past members ==
Past members include (all guitarists) Dan Stamper (2000–2002), Jared Brown (2002–2005), Chris Copulos (2003–2005), and Sean Nicol (2005–2009). Dan Stamper played guitar on the first two Scatterbox releases Run Faster, Jump Higher, and Lipstick Stains and Shotgun Shells. Shortly after the release of Lipstick Stains..., Stamper left the band, and American Zero and Moral Crux guitarist Jared Brown joined the band for the band's third and fourth albums, Infection III and Sudden Movements. Brown left the band in 2006 to pursue other interests, and Sean Nicol (Intifada, Hellrods) stepped in. Chris Copulos was added as a second guitarist in 2003 after leaving the band Ghoul. Copulos left the band in late 2006 to move back to his native Chicago, Illinois, and shortly afterwards joined the band Antagonizers ATL. Mark Cogburn joined the band officially on New Year's Day of 2007 and has been noted as the band's longest standing guitarist. Nicol left the band in 2009 to attend school in Florida and ultimately relocated to Seattle. In late 2010, the band added Justin Smith to the lineup. Justin Smith left the band in 2016, and Jared Brown rejoined for a brief time.

As of 2019, Scatterbox's current lineup consists of the Tom and Ryan White, Sean Nicol, Mark Cogburn, and Scott Rozell. Jared Brown and Scott Rozell were previous and active members of Lookout! Records band Moral Crux. Brown left Moral Crux in 2008 and Rozell remains a permanent member on-and-off over the last 20 years. Rozell joined Green Jellÿ (AKA Green Jello) in the summer of 2018 as a touring drummer.

== Release history ==
The first three Scatterbox releases, Run Faster, Jump Higher, Lipstick Stains and Shotgun Shells (a split release with now-defunct Spokane, WA band American Zero), and Infection III were self-released on the band's own imprint, Blackhouse Records. In 2004, the band signed with Clickpop Records, releasing their 4th and 5th albums Sudden Movements, and ENEMIES, which are the first Scatterbox records to have national and international distribution. The previous records are harder to find currently in physical format. The discography is currently available on digital format. After the release of ENEMIES, Rykodisc entered into a partnership with Clickpop and ultimately acquired the label. The band parted ways with Ryko and Clickpop, and opted to release their next two albums 208: Live at the Knitting Factory, and Ritual on their own imprint, Blackhouse Records.

Scatterbox has appeared on compilations albums with bands such as DEK, The Dillinger Escape Plan, Against All Authority, Morrissey, Citizen Fish, MDC, Destruction Made Simple, The Dresden Dolls, and others. In 2006, the song "Sensitive" from the 2003 album Infection III was used in the soundtrack of Poultrygeist: Night of the Chicken Dead from Troma Entertainment alongside the likes of Dwarves (band), The Nihilistics, and Thee Obscene.

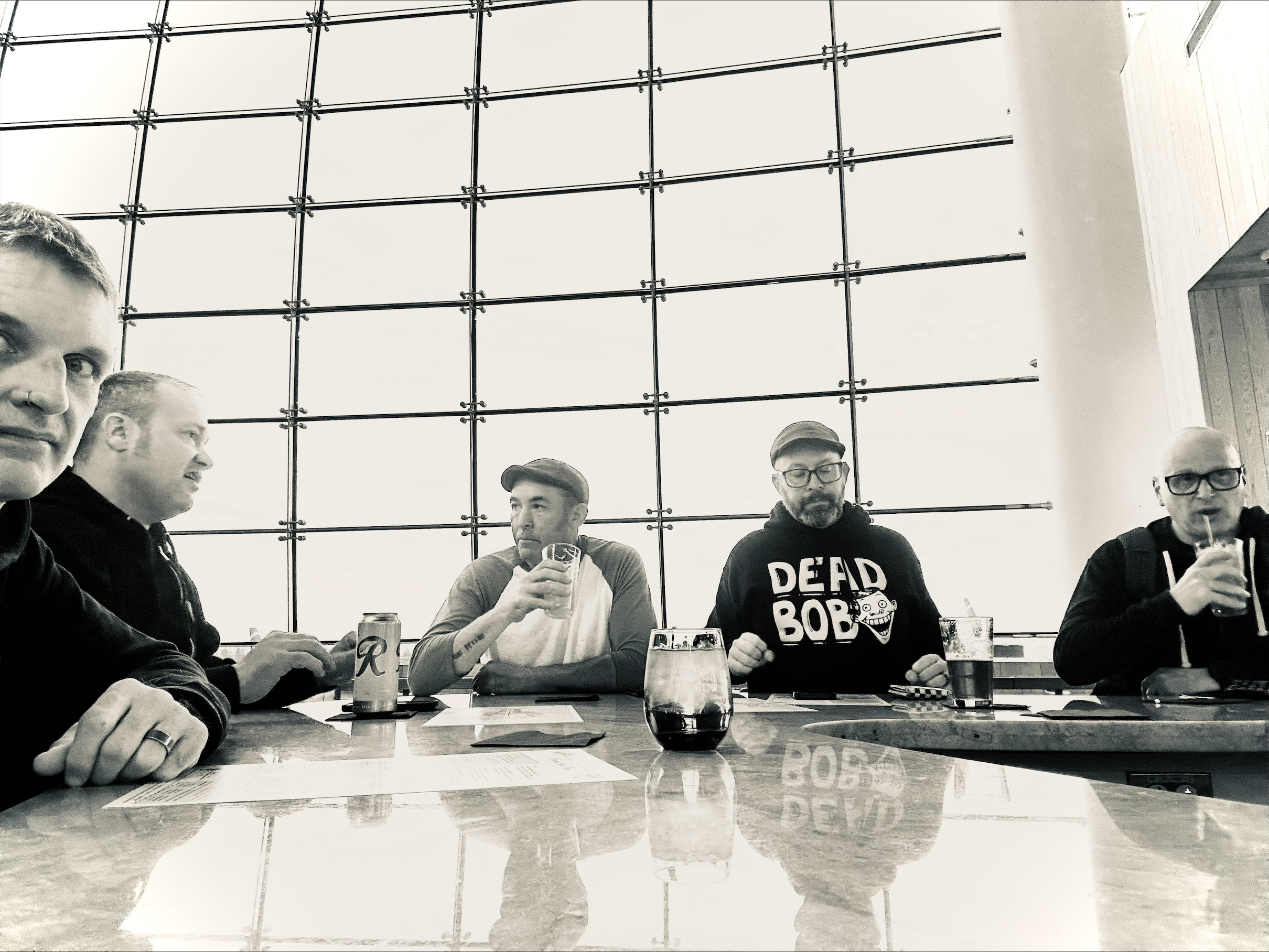
Scatterbox in 2026: L to R - Scott Rozell, Sean Nicol, Tom White, Ryan White, Mark Cogburn

In 2021, the band celebrated their 20th anniversary with a show in Spokane, WA at legendary venue The BIg Dipper (owned by Dan Hoerner of Sunny Day Real Estate. The show was filmed, and was later released as part of a documentary film about the band titled Scatterbox Live: The 20th Anniversary. The film was released on blu-ray and on Amazon Prime in 2022.

In 2026, the album ENEMIES was re-mixed and re-mastered by Kaleb Wrenchy and re-issued on a limited vinyl release as well as digital formats.

The band is currently writing new material for a full length album scheduled for release in 2027.

== Discography ==
- Run Faster, Jump Higher (2001, Blackhouse)
- Lipstick Stains and Shotgun Shells (2002, Blackhouse) - split with American Zero
- Infection III (2003, Blackhouse)
- Sudden Movements (2005 Clickpop Records)
- Vegan (EP) (2007 Blackhouse Records)
- Enemies (2008 Clickpop Records/Rykodisc/Blackhouse)
- 208: Live at The Knitting Factory (Blackhouse/Amazon) - release date: August 3, 2010
- Ritual (2014, Blackhouse/T.F. Enterprises) - release date: October 28, 2014
- Scatterbox Live: The 20th Anniversary (2022 Blackhouse)
