= Annetta R. Chipp =

- Born: Annetta Rebecca Biggs; May 2, 1866; Montpelier, Indiana, U.S.
- Died: March 25, 1961 (aged 94); Boise, Idaho, U.S.
- Other names: Annetta R. Klingensmith
- Occupation: temperance leader
- Organizations: Woman's Christian Temperance Union
- Spouses: Harry Elmer Klingensmith (m. 1886; died 1896); Warren Sydney Chipp (m. 1899; died 1956)
- Children: 6

Annetta R. Chipp (née Biggs; after first marriage, Klingensmith; after second marriage, Chipp; May 2, 1866 – March 25, 1961) was an American temperance leader and prison evangelist. She served as president of the South Idaho Woman's Christian Temperance Union (W.C.T.U.).

== Early life and education ==
Annetta Rebecca Biggs was born at Montpelier, Indiana, May 2, 1866. Her parents were George Washington Biggs (1839–1929) and Margaret (Baldwin) Biggs (1837–1916). Annetta had three sisters and a brother: Viola, Mildred, Carrie, and George.

Almost simultaneously with the beginning of her education in the public schools of Montpelier, she developed an interest for temperance reform through a tragedy wrought by alcoholism in one of the neighboring households, where a father and his son both died of delirium tremens in the same night. The Murphy movement, introduced into the community shortly afterward, afforded children as well as adults the opportunity for organized action, and the young schoolgirl became one of the leaders. Removing with her parents to LeRoy, Michigan, at the age of 14, Miss Biggs there became a member of the Independent Order of Good Templars.

== Career ==
In Boise, Idaho, her active participation in the work of the W.C.T.U. and effective service in various official positions led to her selection as president of the South Idaho W.C.T.U. in 1910, a position which she held for six years, until failing health compelled her retirement to less exacting duties.

For some years thereafter, she served as prison evangelist, holding services in the jails and various other State institutions. By appointment of the governor of the State, she was a delegate to the National Prison Congress. For years, Mr. and Mrs. Chipp opened their home to discharged prisoners, assisting them in finding employment and in reestablishing themselves in life. The home was also opened twice a week to classes of Japanese, where instruction was given in English branches, temperance, and U.S. ways of life.

In addition to the W.C.T.U., Chipp was a member of the First Baptist Church, YWCA, Idaho State Historical Society, and the Daughters of the American Revolution.

== Personal life ==
In 1886, at LeRoy, Michigan, she married Harry Elmer Klingensmith (1862–1896). Widowed in 1896, she then removed with her three children, Gladys, Lloyd, and Charles, to live with her mother at Arlington, Oregon.

In 1899, she married Warren Sydney Chipp (1867–1956) and they settled in Boise, Idaho in 1902, (Note: Chipp's obituary in the Idaho Statesman (1961), records 1903 as the year of relocation to Boise.) where she lived the remainder of her life. Their children were, Warren, Margaret, and Charles.

Annetta Rebecca Chipp died in Boise, Idaho, March 25, 1961.
