= Southern Idaho =

Region within the U.S. state of Idaho

Coordinates: 43°N 115°W

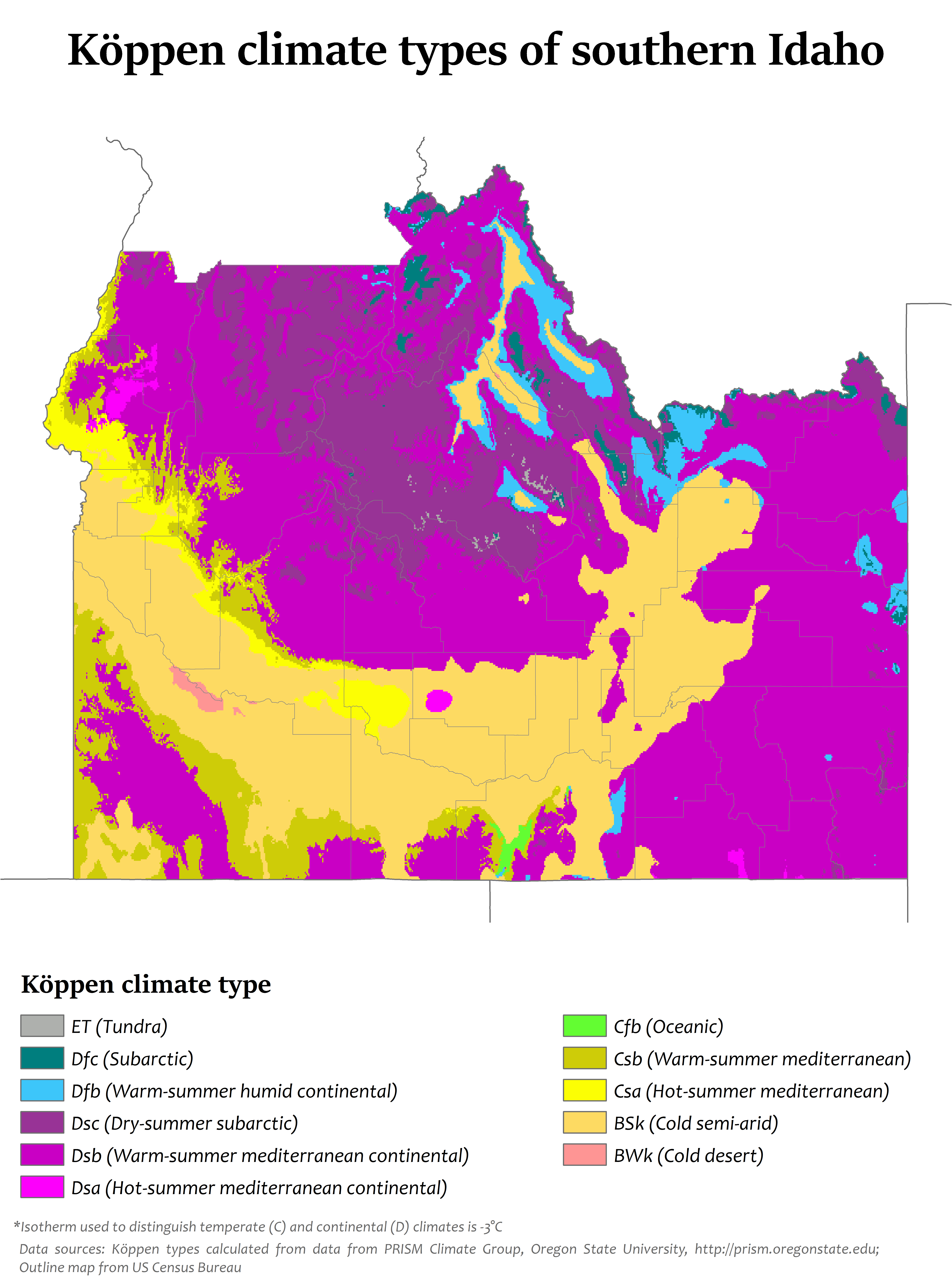
Köppen climate types in southern Idaho

Southern Idaho is a generic geographical term roughly analogous with the areas of the U.S. state of Idaho located in the Mountain Time Zone. It particularly refers to the combined areas of the Boise metropolitan area, the Magic Valley and Eastern Idaho.

Major cities in southern Idaho include Boise, Caldwell, Nampa, Meridian, Pocatello, Idaho Falls and Twin Falls.

== Notable people ==
- Annetta R. Chipp (1866-1961), president, South Idaho Woman's Christian Temperance Union
- Ella D. Crawford (1852-1932), president, South Idaho Woman's Christian Temperance Union

== See also ==
- Southern Idaho ground squirrel
- Time in Idaho
