= Kerry Christensen =

American yodeler

- Born: October 6, 1954 (age 71); Grace, Idaho, United States
- Genres: Yodelling
- Occupations: Singer, musician
- Instruments: Accordion, zither, alphorn

Kerry Christensen (born October 6, 1954) is an American yodeler. He yodels in both western and Alpine styles. He also plays the accordion, the zither, and the alphorn and is very good at imitating chickens.

Christensen was born in 1954 and was raised on a potato farm in Grace, Idaho. A performer from the age of three, he has sung everything from western ballads to barbershop music. While living in Austria from 1974 to 1976, he discovered the folk music that would be his life.

Kerry's first yodeling performance was in 1977, at a Brigham Young University orientation assembly where he received a standing ovation from 15,000 students. In 1984, Disney World in Orlando, Florida hired him to work at the German Pavilion of the Epcot Center in 1984. He was the Disney World Yodeler from 1984 to 1990 and the leader of the night band for the last four of those years.

In 1990, Christensen became a freelance yodeler and performs worldwide. He has recorded 12 albums, including U 2 Can Yodel, a course for people wanting to learn yodeling techniques. In 2009, he was signed to yodel for the surrealist cartoon Living Evil, written and directed by Dadaist and Surrealist artists the Hive of Dukes. Yanni Osmond, co-founder of the Hive, is an avid music historian and professed "weird music fan", and when he saw Kerry yodeling on YouTube, he found his phone number and hired Christensen on the spot. In 2012 McClatchy-Tribune News Service reported that he would "...use his mouth to perform music from a range of cultures: American Indian, German, Swiss, Cajun, and the 'cattle call' of the American West among them."
