= Grace, Idaho =

- City
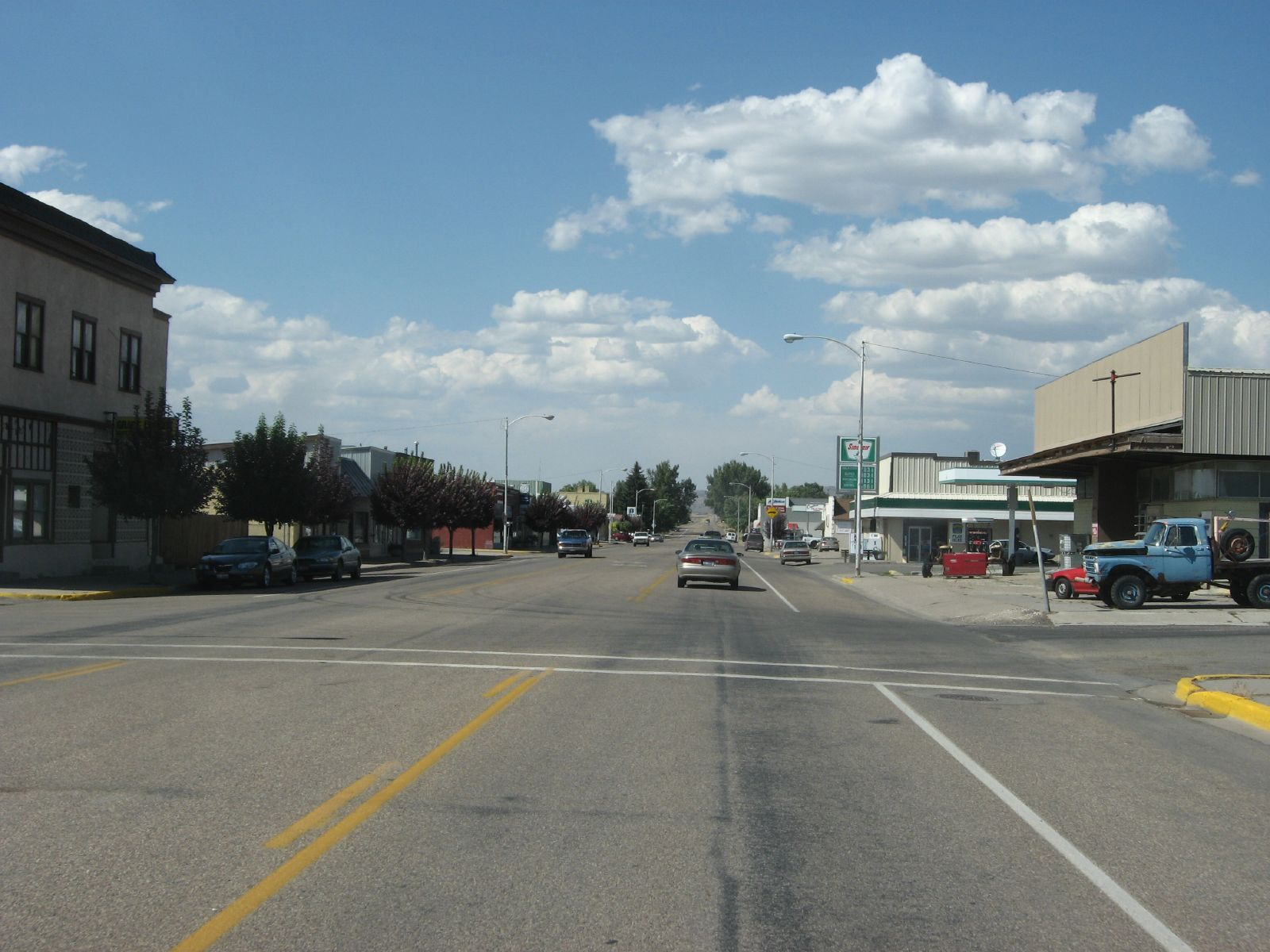

- Location of Grace in Caribou County, Idaho.
- Coordinates: 42°34′32″N 111°43′48″W
- Country: United States
- State: Idaho
- County: Caribou

Area
  - Total: 0.96 sq mi (2.48 km^{2})
  - Land: 0.96 sq mi (2.48 km^{2})
  - Water: 0 sq mi (0.00 km^{2})
- Elevation: 5,535 ft (1,687 m)

Population (2020)
  - Total: 920
  - Density: 976.0/sq mi (376.82/km^{2})
- Time zone: UTC-7 (Mountain (MST))
  - Summer (DST): UTC-6 (MDT)
- ZIP code: 83241
- Area code: 208
- FIPS code: 16-32500
- GNIS feature ID: 2410626
- Website: www.cityofgraceid.com

Grace is a city in Caribou County, Idaho, United States. The population was 920 at the 2020 census.

== History ==
The area of Grace was once inhabited by the Shoshone Indians. The Oregon Trail passed within 4 miles (6.4 km) of Grace, and the town itself was established with a post office in 1894. Unlike other nearby historic towns such as Paris and Franklin, Grace was not originally settled by Mormon pioneers, but has since become a predominantly Mormon-populated town. The economy in and around Grace has traditionally been driven by agriculture, with potatoes, alfalfa, grain, dairy, and ranching being the main staples.

== Geography ==
According to the United States Census Bureau, the city has a total area of 0.99 square miles (2.56 km^{2}), all of it land.

Grace is one of the northernmost cities along the Wasatch Range, which extends approximately 160 miles (260 km) south, and is only 1 mile (1.6 km) west of the large fault line that defines the range. Grace is located near the center of Gem Valley.

In stark contrast to the surrounding mountains, the valley floor in the immediate area of Grace is flat due to volcanic activity in the area some 30,000 years ago. The lava flow that created the valley also diverted the Bear River from its Pacific drainage into the Great Basin. This was a significant contributor to the growth of the prehistoric Lake Bonneville of which the Great Salt Lake is a remnant. Lake Bonneville reached its farthest north advance about four miles (6 km) southwest of Grace before it broke through the earthen barrier at Red Rock pass north of Preston, Idaho. The Bear River today runs to the north and west of Grace and terminates in the Great Salt Lake.

Grace's neighboring towns are Soda Springs to the northeast, Bancroft to the northwest, and Preston to the south. It is about 20 miles (32 km) from Lava Hot Springs, which is a local tourism and recreation destination. The nearest city with a major airport is Salt Lake City, Utah, which is approximately 175 miles (282 km) south.

=== Climate ===
This climatic region is typified by large seasonal temperature differences, with warm to hot (and often humid) summers and cold (sometimes severely cold) winters. According to the Köppen Climate Classification system, Grace has a humid continental climate, abbreviated "Dfb" on climate maps.

== Demographics ==
Historical population
Census	Pop.	Note	%±
1930	626		—
1940	701		12.0%
1950	761		8.6%
1960	725		−4.7%
1970	826		13.9%
1980	1,216		47.2%
1990	973		−20.0%
2000	990		1.7%
2010	915		−7.6%
2020	920		0.5%
2019 (est.)	935		2.2%
U.S. Decennial Census

=== 2010 census ===
As of the census of 2010, there were 915 people, 366 households, and 266 families residing in the city. The population density was 924.2 inhabitants per square mile (356.8/km^{2}). There were 400 housing units at an average density of 404.0 per square mile (156.0/km^{2}). The racial makeup of the city was 96.9% White, 0.1% African American, 0.4% Native American, 0.1% Asian, 0.1% Pacific Islander, 1.5% from other races, and 0.8% from two or more races. Hispanic or Latino of any race were 4.2% of the population.

There were 366 households, of which 33.6% had children under the age of 18 living with them, 62.0% were married couples living together, 5.7% had a female householder with no husband present, 4.9% had a male householder with no wife present, and 27.3% were non-families. 24.6% of all households were made up of individuals, and 13.7% had someone living alone who was 65 years of age or older. The average household size was 2.50, and the average family size was 3.00.

The median age in the city was 38.9 years. 26.3% of residents were under the age of 18; 6.1% were between the ages of 18 and 24; 23.3% were from 25 to 44; 25.9% were from 45 to 64; and 18.5% were 65 years of age or older. The gender makeup of the city was 52.3% male and 47.7% female.

=== 2000 census ===
As of the census of 2000, there were 990 people, 364 households, and 274 families residing in the city. The population density was 1,002.7 inhabitants per square mile (387.1/km^{2}). There were 389 housing units at an average density of 394.0 per square mile (152.1/km^{2}). The racial makeup of the city was 95.56% White, 0.20% Native American, 3.33% from other races, and 0.91% from two or more races. Hispanic or Latino of any race were 4.95% of the population.

There were 364 households, out of which 35.2% had children under the age of 18 living with them, 64.3% were married couples living together, 6.3% had a female householder with no husband present, and 24.5% were non-families. 23.4% of all households were made up of individuals, and 14.8% had someone living alone who was 65 years of age or older. The average household size was 2.72, and the average family size was 3.21.

In the city, the population was spread out, with 31.4% under the age of 18, 6.9% from 18 to 24, 23.8% from 25 to 44, 22.5% from 45 to 64, and 15.4% who were 65 years of age or older. The median age was 36 years. For every 100 females, there were 103.3 males. For every 100 females age 18 and over, there were 92.9 males.

The median income for a household in the city was $32,303, and the median income for a family was $39,306. Males had a median income of $33,214 versus $14,306 for females. The per capita income for the city was $13,452. About 5.7% of families and 7.0% of the population were below the poverty line, including 6.8% of those under age 18 and 11.7% of those age 65 or over.

== Arts and culture ==
Grace hosts the Caribou County Fair and Rodeo. It is the county's largest event.

== Education ==
There are 3 schools: Black Canyon Elementary School, Grace Junior High School, and Grace High School; they are all under the oversight of Grace School District #148.

== Notable people ==
- Kerry Christensen - yodeler.
- Marc Gibbs - Former member of the Idaho House of Representatives; lives in Grace.
- Phil Johnson - basketball player, college and NBA coach.
- Junior Van Noy - Medal of Honor recipient.
