= National Register of Historic Places listings in Ravalli County, Montana =

Location of Ravalli County in Montana

This is a list of the National Register of Historic Places listings in Ravalli County, Montana.

This is intended to be a complete list of the properties and districts on the National Register of Historic Places in Ravalli County, Montana, United States. There are 92 properties and districts listed on the National Register in the county.

This National Park Service list is complete through NPS recent listings posted October 16, 2026.

== Current listings ==
	Name on the Register	Image	Date listed	Location	City or town	Description
1	Allison-Reinkeh House	Allison-Reinkeh House	August 26, 1988 (#88001280)	207 Adirondac St. 46°15′17″N 114°09′29″W	Hamilton	part of the Hamilton MRA
2	Alta Ranger Station	Alta Ranger Station	December 19, 1974 (#74001099)	South of Conner in the Bitterroot National Forest; 45°37′08″N 114°17′55″W	Conner	
3	Bass Mansion	Bass Mansion	November 14, 1978 (#78001691)	216 N. College St. 46°30′43″N 114°05′20″W	Stevensville	
4	Daniel V. Bean House	Daniel V. Bean House	August 26, 1988 (#88001288)	611 N. 2nd 46°15′10″N 114°09′27″W	Hamilton	part of the Hamilton MRA
5	Big Creek Lake Site	Big Creek Lake Site	May 17, 1976 (#76001127)	Address restricted	Stevensville	
6	Bitter Root Cooperative Creamery	Bitter Root Cooperative Creamery	June 19, 1991 (#91000726)	3730 Eastside Highway; 46°30′44″N 114°04′54″W	Stevensville	part of the Stevensville MRA
7	Oliver Blood House	Oliver Blood House	August 26, 1988 (#88001279)	524 S. 1st St. 46°14′33″N 114°09′13″W	Hamilton	part of the Hamilton MRA
8	Boulder Point Lookout	Boulder Point Lookout	November 10, 1980 (#100002044)	2 miles (3.2 km) NW of West Fork Ranger Station; 45°50′16″N 114°17′21″W	Darby vicinity	
9	Brooks Hotel	Brooks Hotel	November 10, 1980 (#80002430)	Off the East Side Highway; 46°18′46″N 114°06′44″W	Corvallis	
10	Charles Amos Buck House	Charles Amos Buck House	June 18, 1991 (#91000727)	211 Buck St. 46°30′37″N 114°05′38″W	Stevensville	part of the Stevensville MRA
11	Fred Buck House	Fred Buck House	June 18, 1991 (#91000729)	217 Buck St. 46°30′36″N 114°05′39″W	Stevensville	part of the Stevensville MRA
12	Canyon Creek Laboratory of the U.S. Public Health Service	Canyon Creek Laboratory of the U.S. Public Health Service	October 15, 1970 (#70000362)	West of Hamilton city limits 46°15′15″N 114°10′49″W	Hamilton	Altered and now home to the Hamilton Players Theater.
13	W.T. Caple House	W.T. Caple House	June 19, 1991 (#91000730)	210 Church St. 46°30′37″N 114°05′28″W	Stevensville	part of the Stevensville MRA
14	Jennie Clark House	Jennie Clark House	June 19, 1991 (#91000731)	423 Pine St. 46°30′25″N 114°05′21″W	Stevensville	part of the Stevensville MRA
15	William Cochran House	William Cochran House	June 19, 1991 (#91000732)	3713 East Side Highway; 46°30′46″N 114°05′00″W	Stevensville	part of the Stevensville MRA
16	Como School	Como School	November 22, 2022 (#100008424)	Jct. of Old Darby Rd. and US 93; 46°05′27″N 114°10′33″W	Darby vicinity	
17	Conway House	Conway House	August 26, 1988 (#88001291)	805 S. 4th St. 46°14′20″N 114°09′32″W	Hamilton	part of the Hamilton MRA
18	Calvin and Maggie Cook House	Calvin and Maggie Cook House	June 19, 1991 (#91000734)	501 Main St. 46°30′24″N 114°05′36″W	Stevensville	part of the Stevensville MRA
19	Wilbur Cook House	Wilbur Cook House	June 19, 1991 (#91000733)	3717 East Side Highway; 46°30′46″N 114°04′59″W	Stevensville	part of the Stevensville MRA
20	Martin Cramer House	Martin Cramer House	August 3, 1987 (#87001259)	326 Groff La. 46°25′32″N 114°04′51″W	Stevensville	
21	Marcus Daly Memorial Hospital	Marcus Daly Memorial Hospital	December 15, 1978 (#78001690)	211 S. 4th St. 46°14′43″N 114°09′34″W	Hamilton	
22	DeNayer House	DeNayer House	July 29, 1994 (#94000782)	327 Main St. 46°30′31″N 114°06′18″W	Stevensville	part of the Stevensville MRA
23	F.H. Drinkenberg's First Home	F.H. Drinkenberg's First Home	August 26, 1988 (#88001289)	701 N. 2nd 46°15′12″N 114°09′27″W	Hamilton	part of the Hamilton MRA
24	El Capitan Lodge	El Capitan Lodge	November 29, 1990 (#90001792)	Access Rd. 1111 on the northern shore of Lake Como in the Bitterroot National Forest; 46°03′56″N 114°14′42″W	Hamilton	
25	E.G. Ellis House	E.G. Ellis House	August 26, 1988 (#88001281)	801 N. 3rd 46°15′17″N 114°09′32″W	Hamilton	part of the Hamilton MRA
26	Emhoff House	Emhoff House	June 19, 1991 (#91000736)	401 Church St. 46°30′29″N 114°05′31″W	Stevensville	part of the Stevensville MRA
27	Etna School	Etna School	May 30, 1997 (#97000504)	2853 Eastside Highway; 46°25′59″N 114°05′39″W	Stevensville	
28	First Baptist Church	First Baptist Church	September 3, 1991 (#91000737)	402 Church; 46°30′29″N 114°05′30″W	Stevensville	part of the Stevensville MRA
29	First State Bank, Dowling and Emhoff Buildings	First State Bank, Dowling and Emhoff Buildings	June 19, 1991 (#91000738)	300-304 and 306-308 Main St. 46°30′35″N 114°05′33″W	Stevensville	part of the Stevensville MRA
30	Joseph Fisher House	Joseph Fisher House	June 19, 1991 (#91000739)	103 College St. 46°30′43″N 114°05′23″W	Stevensville	part of the Stevensville MRA
31	Fort Owen	Fort Owen	October 6, 1970 (#70000363)	About 0.5 miles (0.80 km) northwest of Stevensville; 46°31′10″N 114°05′49″W	Stevensville	
32	Perry Foust House	Perry Foust House	June 19, 1991 (#91000740)	401 Mission St. 46°30′31″N 114°05′45″W	Stevensville	part of the Stevensville MRA; demolished.
33	Foye Rental Houses	Foye Rental Houses	August 26, 1988 (#88001292)	819 and 821 N. 4th 46°15′17″N 114°09′38″W	Hamilton	part of the Hamilton MRA
34	Charles Fulton House	Charles Fulton House	June 19, 1991 (#91000742)	377 5th St. 46°30′22″N 114°05′24″W	Stevensville	part of the Stevensville MRA
35	Gavin House	Gavin House	June 19, 1991 (#91000743)	219 College St. 46°30′35″N 114°05′25″W	Stevensville	part of the Stevensville MRA
36	Sherman Gill House	Sherman Gill House	August 26, 1988 (#88001282)	605 N. 3rd 46°15′07″N 114°09′32″W	Hamilton	part of the Hamilton MRA
37	Gird Point Lookout	Gird Point Lookout	April 6, 2018 (#100002297)	Gird Pt., Sapphire Mts., Bitterroot NF; 46°12′27″N 113°54′42″W	Hamilton vicinity	
38	Gleason Building	Gleason Building	June 19, 1991 (#91000744)	200-202 Main St. 46°30′39″N 114°05′27″W	Stevensville	part of the Stevensville MRA
39	Goff House	Goff House	August 26, 1988 (#88001283)	115 N. 5th 46°14′50″N 114°09′39″W	Hamilton	part of the Hamilton MRA
40	Gordon House	Gordon House	August 26, 1988 (#88001294)	806 S. 4th 46°14′22″N 114°09′29″W	Hamilton	part of the Hamilton MRA
41	Charles Granke House	Charles Granke House	August 26, 1988 (#88001278)	406 S. 7th St. 46°14′36″N 114°09′45″W	Hamilton	part of the Hamilton MRA
42	Hamilton Commercial Historic District	Hamilton Commercial Historic District	September 1, 1988 (#88001273)	Main, N. 2nd, S. 2nd, S. 3rd, and State Sts. 46°14′50″N 114°09′27″W	Hamilton	part of the Hamilton MRA
43	Hamilton Southside Residential Historic District	Hamilton Southside Residential Historic District	September 1, 1988 (#88001272)	S. 1st, S. 2nd, S. 3rd, S. 4th, and S. 5th Sts. 46°14′35″N 114°09′27″W	Hamilton	part of the Hamilton MRA
44	Hamilton Town Hall	Hamilton Town Hall	April 21, 1980 (#80002431)	175 S. 3rd St. 46°14′46″N 114°09′29″W	Hamilton	Not the current city hall.
45	Rose Harrington House	Rose Harrington House	June 19, 1991 (#91000745)	3709 East Side Highway; 46°30′46″N 114°05′00″W	Stevensville	part of the Stevensville MRA
46	Hayward Lodge	Hayward Lodge	May 11, 2015 (#15000216)	On L. Como; 46°03′55″N 114°14′41″W	Bitterroot National Forest, Darby vicinity	Now known as Wood's Cabin.
47	Charles Hoffman House	Charles Hoffman House	August 26, 1988 (#88001277)	807 S. 3rd 46°14′20″N 114°09′23″W	Hamilton	part of the Hamilton MRA
48	John G. Howe House	John G. Howe House	June 18, 1991 (#91000746)	215 Park Ave. 46°30′27″N 114°05′05″W	Stevensville	part of the Stevensville MRA
49	IOOF Hall	IOOF Hall	June 19, 1991 (#91000747)	217-219 Main St. 46°30′37″N 114°05′35″W	Stevensville	part of the Stevensville MRA
50	John Lagerquist House	John Lagerquist House	August 26, 1988 (#88001284)	701 N. 4th St. 46°15′12″N 114°09′37″W	Hamilton	part of the Hamilton MRA
51	Lancaster House	Lancaster House	June 19, 1991 (#91000748)	407 3rd St. 46°30′33″N 114°05′16″W	Stevensville	part of the Stevensville MRA
52	John A. Landram House	John A. Landram House	March 14, 1996 (#91000749)	113 College St. 46°30′42″N 114°05′11″W	Stevensville	part of the Stevensville MRA
53	Lockridge House	Lockridge House	June 19, 1991 (#91000750)	301 Mission St. 46°30′35″N 114°04′57″W	Stevensville	part of the Stevensville MRA
54	Lost Horse Fireman's Cabin (24RA197)		April 17, 1989 (#88003437)	Off Lost Horse Rd. near Bear Creek Pass; 46°07′50″N 114°29′33″W	Darby	
55	Albert May House	Albert May House	June 18, 1991 (#91000751)	218 Church St. 46°30′36″N 114°05′27″W	Stevensville	part of the Stevensville MRA
56	Charles May House	Charles May House	June 18, 1991 (#91000753)	109 Church St. 46°30′43″N 114°05′28″W	Stevensville	part of the Stevensville MRA
57	George May House	George May House	October 25, 1982 (#82000596)	100 Park Ave. 46°30′32″N 114°05′01″W	Stevensville	
58	Harry May House	Harry May House	June 18, 1991 (#91000752)	526 3rd St. 46°30′34″N 114°05′04″W	Stevensville	part of the Stevensville MRA
59	Louis May House	Louis May House	June 19, 1991 (#91000754)	100 Church St. 46°30′44″N 114°05′26″W	Stevensville	part of the Stevensville MRA
60	McCart Fire Lookout		June 19, 1996 (#96000660)	Approximately 4 miles (6.4 km) south of the East Fork Forest Service Station in Bitterroot National Forest; 45°53′05″N 113°43′00″W	Sula	
61	James McCrossin Cabin	James McCrossin Cabin	December 2, 2019 (#100004710)	1237 MT 93 S. 46°10′17″N 114°10′53″W	Hamilton vicinity	
62	McFarlane House	McFarlane House	June 19, 1991 (#91000755)	200 College St. 46°30′39″N 114°05′22″W	Stevensville	part of the Stevensville MRA
63	McGlauflin House	McGlauflin House	August 26, 1988 (#88001276)	518 S. 8th 46°14′31″N 114°09′50″W	Hamilton	part of the Hamilton MRA
64	John McLaughlin House	John McLaughlin House	June 19, 1991 (#91000757)	105 Main St. 46°30′44″N 114°05′35″W	Stevensville	part of the Stevensville MRA; demolished
65	Medicine Point Lookout		April 6, 2018 (#100002298)	Medicine Pt., Sula Ranger Dist., Bitterroot NF; 45°48′25″N 114°06′37″W	Darby vicinity	
66	Metcalf House	Metcalf House	June 19, 1991 (#91000758)	214 Pine St. 46°30′34″N 114°04′55″W	Stevensville	part of the Stevensville MRA
67	Methodist Episcopal Church South	Methodist Episcopal Church South	November 24, 1997 (#97001453)	Junction of 1st St. and the Eastside Highway; 46°18′57″N 114°06′48″W	Corvallis	
68	Philip and Ella Morr House	Philip and Ella Morr House	June 19, 1991 (#91000760)	502 Buck St. 46°30′24″N 114°05′41″W	Stevensville	part of the Stevensville MRA
69	Pine Apartments	Pine Apartments	August 26, 1988 (#88001295)	804 S. 4th St. 46°14′20″N 114°09′29″W	Hamilton	part of the Hamilton MRA
70	Popham Ranch	Popham Ranch	January 13, 1989 (#88003141)	460 NE. Popham Ln. 46°20′45″N 114°05′29″W	Corvallis	
71	Ravalli County Courthouse	Ravalli County Courthouse	April 20, 1979 (#79001424)	225 Bedford St. 46°14′40″N 114°09′26″W	Hamilton	The old courthouse, now a local history museum
72	Riverside	Riverside	July 16, 1987 (#87001235)	251 Eastside Highway; 46°15′57″N 114°08′20″W	Hamilton	Once the home of Marcus Daly
73	Rocky Mountain Laboratory Historic District	Rocky Mountain Laboratory Historic District	September 1, 1988 (#88001274)	900 block of 4th St. 46°14′14″N 114°09′29″W	Hamilton	part of the Hamilton MRA
74	St. Mary's Church and Pharmacy	St. Mary's Church and Pharmacy	October 6, 1970 (#70000364)	North Ave. • St. Mary's Mission Historic District boundary increase (listed August 16, 2010, refnum 10000552): West end of 4th St. 46°30′29″N 114°05′43″W	Stevensville	
75	St. Mary Peak Lookout	St. Mary Peak Lookout	April 6, 2018 (#100002299)	Saint Mary Peak, Stevensville Ranger Dist., Bitterroot NF; 46°30′42″N 114°14′37″W	Stevensville vicinity	
76	John Sharp House	John Sharp House	June 19, 1991 (#91000761)	306 College St. 46°30′33″N 114°05′22″W	Stevensville	part of the Stevensville MRA
77	Stevensville Feed Mill	Stevensville Feed Mill	June 19, 1991 (#91000762)	407 Main St. 46°30′29″N 114°05′36″W	Stevensville	part of the Stevensville MRA
78	Stevensville Grade School-United Methodist Church	Stevensville Grade School-United Methodist Church	June 19, 1991 (#91000764)	216 College St. 46°30′36″N 114°05′22″W	Stevensville	part of the Stevensville MRA
79	Stevensville Mercantile Company Oil Storage Building	Stevensville Mercantile Company Oil Storage Building	June 19, 1991 (#91000763)	300 Mission St. 46°30′36″N 114°05′43″W	Stevensville	part of the Stevensville MRA; demolished
80	John Stout House	John Stout House	August 26, 1988 (#88001290)	1000 S. 1st 46°14′13″N 114°09′11″W	Hamilton	part of the Hamilton MRA
81	Summers-Quast Farmstead	Summers-Quast Farmstead	December 30, 1997 (#97001590)	1288 Eastside Highway; 46°19′39″N 114°06′45″W	Corvallis	
82	Thornton Hospital	Thornton Hospital	June 19, 1991 (#91000765)	107 E. 3rd St. 46°30′35″N 114°06′17″W	Stevensville	part of the Stevensville MRA
83	Erick Trosdahl House	Erick Trosdahl House	August 26, 1988 (#88001275)	206 S. 7th St. 46°14′43″N 114°09′46″W	Hamilton	part of the Hamilton MRA
84	University Heights Historic District		August 14, 2012 (#12000501)	469 Bunkhouse Creek Rd. 46°01′50″N 114°13′05″W	Darby vicinity	
85	VFW Club	VFW Club	August 26, 1988 (#88001287)	930 Adirondac; 46°15′18″N 114°10′16″W	Hamilton	part of the Hamilton MRA
86	Frank Wallin House	Frank Wallin House	August 26, 1988 (#88001293)	608 N. 7th St. 46°15′08″N 114°09′51″W	Hamilton	part of the Hamilton MRA
87	Other C. Wamsley House	Other C. Wamsley House	August 26, 1988 (#88001285)	200 N. 5th St. 46°14′54″N 114°09′37″W	Hamilton	part of the Hamilton MRA
88	West Fork Ranger Station	West Fork Ranger Station	July 18, 2023 (#100009135)	6735 West Fork Rd. 45°48′58″N 114°15′30″W	Darby vicinity	
89	Whaley Homestead	Whaley Homestead	March 26, 1992 (#91000442)	Wildfowl Rd. west of the East Side Highway in the Lee Metcalf National Wildlife Refuge; 46°33′03″N 114°04′36″W	Stevensville	
90	Williams House	Williams House	June 19, 1991 (#91000766)	500 5th St. 46°30′23″N 114°05′11″W	Stevensville	part of the Stevensville MRA
91	John and Ann Williams House	John and Ann Williams House	June 19, 1991 (#91000735)	205 Church St. 46°30′37″N 114°05′29″W	Stevensville	part of the Stevensville MRA
92	Benjamin Young House	Benjamin Young House	June 19, 1991 (#91000741)	523 Main St. 46°30′18″N 114°05′33″W	Stevensville	part of the Stevensville MRA

== See also ==
- List of National Historic Landmarks in Montana
- National Register of Historic Places listings in Montana
