= Lancaster House (disambiguation) =

Lancaster House is a mansion in the St. James's district in the West End of London.

Lancaster House may also refer to:

== England ==
- Lancaster House, Manchester, an Edwardian warehouse on Whitworth Street

== United States ==
Alphabetical by state, then town

- John L. Lancaster House, Mountain View, Arkansas, listed on the National Register of Historic Places (NRHP) in Stone County
- John Lancaster House (Keene, Kentucky), NRHP-listed in Jessamine County
- Lancaster House (Stevensville, Montana), NRHP-listed
- King–Lancaster–McCoy–Mitchell House, Bristol, Virginia, NRHP-listed
- Judge Columbia Lancaster House, Ridgefield, Washington, NRHP-listed

== See also ==
- Lancaster Block (disambiguation)
