= Conway House =

Conway House may refer to:

in the United States

(by state)

- Colonel Edward Power Conway House, Phoenix, Arizona, listed on the National Register of Historic Places (NRHP) in Maricopa County, Montana
- Conway House (Camden, Maine), listed on the NRHP in Knox County, Maine
- Conway House (Hamilton, Montana), listed on the NRHP in Ravalli County, Montana
- Conway House (Falmouth, Virginia), listed on the NRHP in Stafford County, Virginia
