= Stout House =

Stout House may refer to:

- Ward-Stout House, Bradford, Arkansas
- Daniel Stout House, Bloomington Township, Indiana
- Knight-Stout House, Finchville, Kentucky, listed on the National Register of Historic Places
- Ben Stout House, Jeffersontown, Kentucky, listed on the National Register of Historic Places
- Stout House (Petoskey, Michigan)
- James C. and Agnes M. Stout House, Lake City, Minnesota
- John Stout House, Hamilton, Montana, listed on the NRHP
- Joseph Stout House, Hopewell, New Jersey, listed on the NRHP
- Charles Stout House, a part of the South Fountain Avenue Historic District, Springfield, Ohio
- Isaac Stout House, Williams Township, Pennsylvania
