= Whaley House =

Whaley House may refer to:

- Whaley House (Arcata, California), listed on the National Register of Historic Places (NRHP) in Humboldt County, California
- Whaley House (San Diego, California), listed on the NRHP
- Marion S. Whaley Citrus Packing House, Rockledge, Florida, listed on the NRHP
- Robert J. Whaley House, Flint, Michigan, listed on the NRHP
- Whaley Homestead, Stevensville, Montana, listed on the NRHP in Ravalli County, Montana
- W. B. Smith Whaley House, Columbia, South Carolina, listed on the NRHP
- Whaley House (Longview, Texas), listed on the NRHP in Gregg County, Texas

== See also ==
- Whaley (disambiguation)
- Whaley Hall, an American football player
