= Allison-Reinkeh House =

Historic house in Montana, United States

- Allison--Reinkeh House
- U.S. National Register of Historic Places
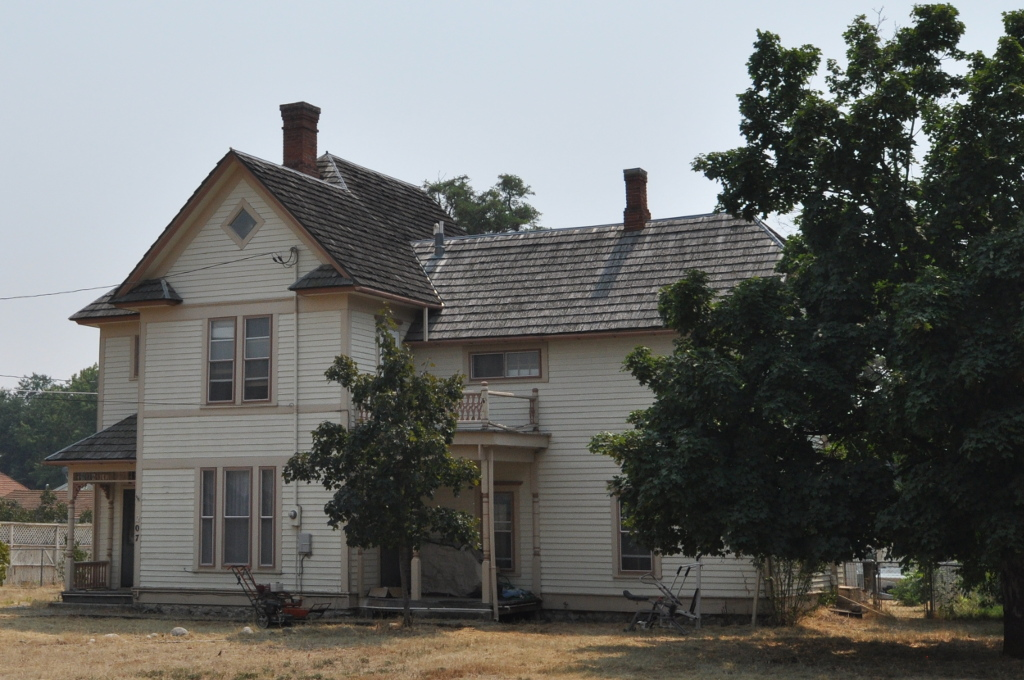

- Location within Montana Location within the United States
- Location: 207 Adirondac Street, Hamilton, Montana
- Coordinates: 46°15′17″N 114°09′29″W
- Area: less than one acre
- Built: 1889
- Architectural style: Late Victorian, Queen Anne
- MPS: Hamilton MRA
- NRHP reference No.: 88001280
- Added to NRHP: August 26, 1988

The Allison-Reinkeh House is a historic house in Hamilton, Montana, U.S.. It was built in 1889 for Martha Allison-Reinkeh, a homesteader from New York. Prior to moving to Montana, she married William C. Reinkeh, and they ran the Allison Telegraph Institute in Philadelphia. The Reinkehs became large landowners in Montana. The house was later purchased by William Fullerton, followed by Robert Kolski.

The house was designed in the Queen Anne architectural style. It has been listed on the National Register of Historic Places since August 26, 1988.
