= Daniel V. Bean House =

Historic house in Montana, United States

- U.S. National Register of Historic Places
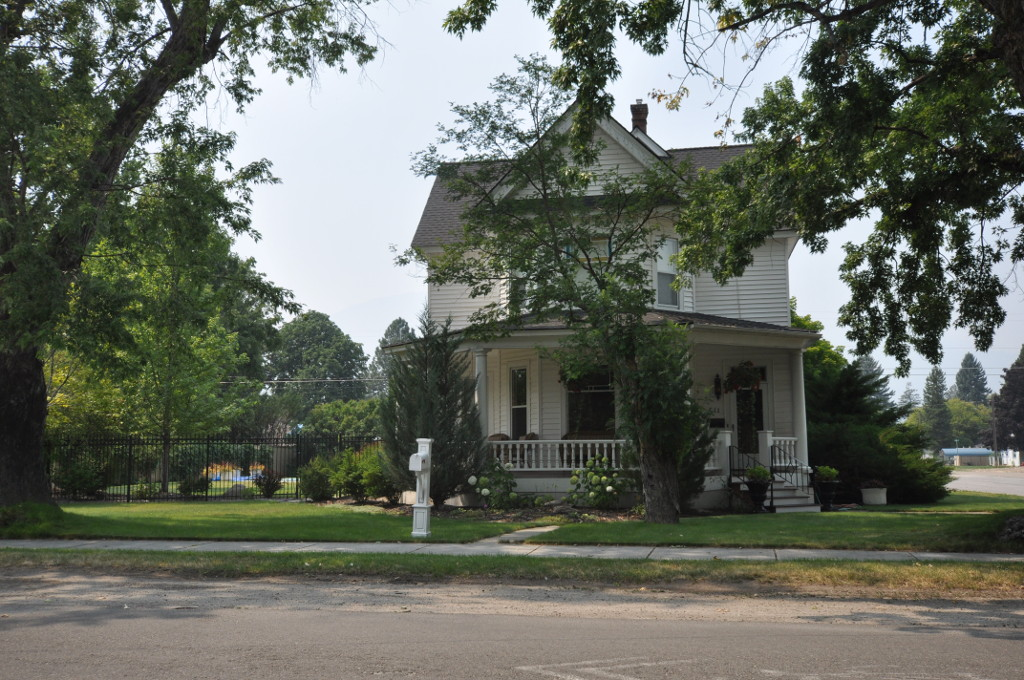

- Location within Montana Location within the United States
- Location: 611 North Second, Hamilton, Montana
- Coordinates: 46°15′10″N 114°09′27″W
- Area: less than one acre
- Built: 1900
- Architectural style: Colonial Revival, Queen Anne
- MPS: Hamilton MRA
- NRHP reference No.: 88001288
- Added to NRHP: August 26, 1988

The Daniel V. Bean House is a historic house in Hamilton, Montana, U.S.. It was built in 1900. It is listed on the National Register of Historic Places.

== History ==
The house was built in 1900 for Daniel V. Bean, a mill owner who was associated with copper baron and rancher Marcus Daly. Bean lived here with his wife, their two sons and their daughter. He was a Freemason, and he died in 1910.

In 1916, the house was acquired by Casper Oertli, a wheat thresher who worked on Daly's ranches. Oertli, who was born in Chicago, lived here with his wife, née Lucy Turnell, and their two sons. He was a Freemason for three decades, and he died in 1938.

== Architectural significance ==
The house was designed in the Colonial Revival and Queen Anne architectural styles. It has been listed on the National Register of Historic Places since August 26, 1988.
