= VFW (disambiguation) =

VFW is an initialism for Veterans of Foreign Wars, a U.S. war veterans' organization.

VFW may also refer to:

- Vancouver Fashion Week, an event in Vancouver, British Columbia, Canada
- Vereinigte Flugtechnische Werke, a former German aerospace manufacturer
  - VFW-Fokker GmbH, a joint venture of Fokker and Vereinigte Flugtechnische Werke
- Veterans of Foreign Wars Parkway (VFW Parkway), a major road in Boston, Massachusetts, U.S.
- Veterans of Future Wars, an American satirical political organization, founded and disbanded in 1936
- VFW (film), a 2019 thriller film by Joe Begos
- VFW Club, a historic building in Hamilton, Montana, listed on the U.S. National Register of Historic Places
- Video for Windows, a video-editing program for Microsoft Windows
