= Oliver Blood House =

Historic house in Montana, United States

- U.S. National Register of Historic Places
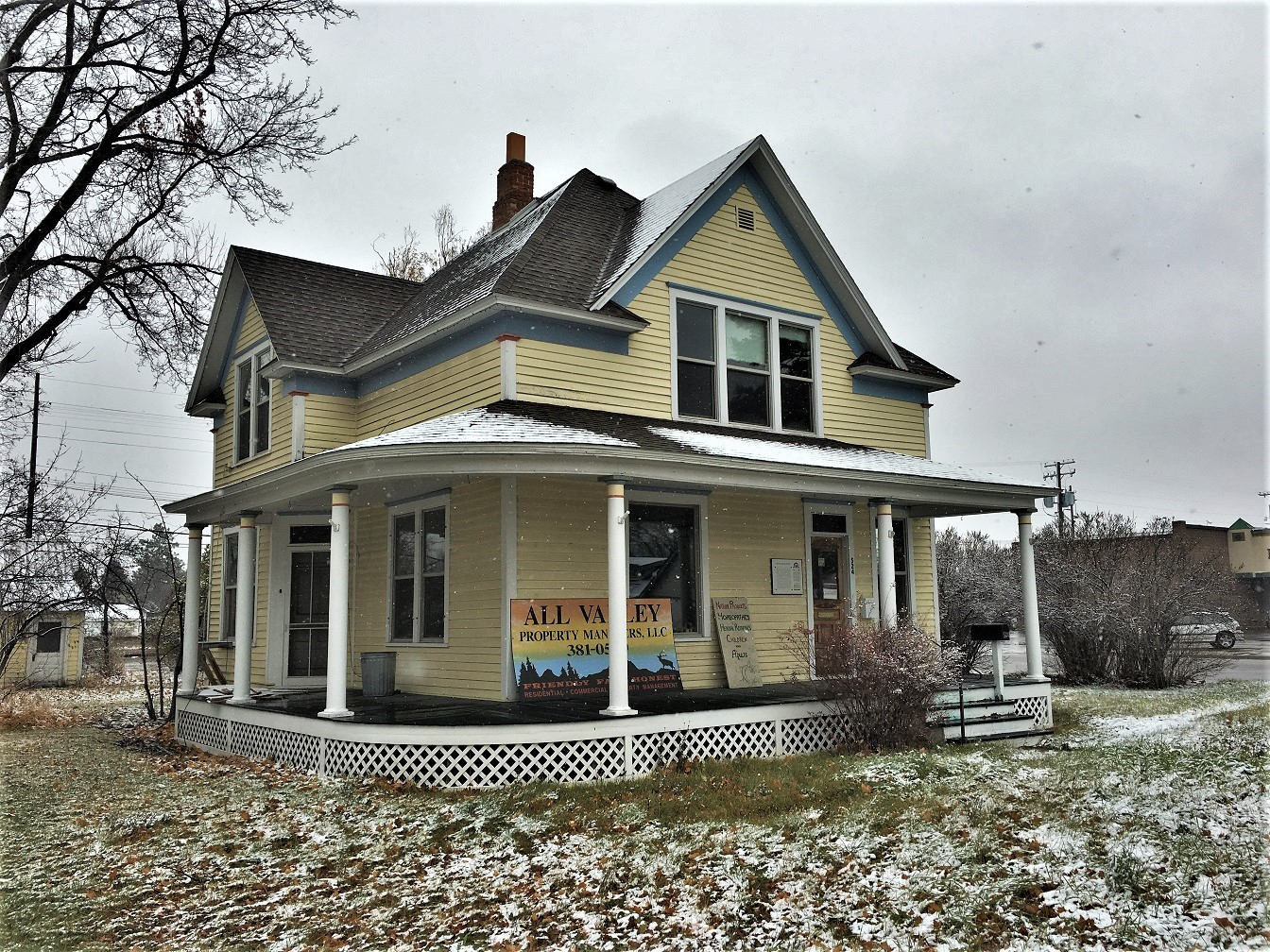

- Location within Montana Location within the United States
- Location: 524 South First Street, Hamilton, Montana
- Coordinates: 46°14′33″N 114°9′13″W
- Area: less than one acre
- Built: 1902
- Architect: Freeze, David
- Architectural style: Colonial Revival, Queen Anne
- MPS: Hamilton MRA
- NRHP reference No.: 88001279
- Added to NRHP: August 26, 1988

The Oliver Blood House is a historic house in Hamilton, Montana. It was built in 1902 for Vinum Oliver Blood, a rancher. Blood was born in Illinois in 1860 and he became a bee-keeper for copper baron Marcus Daly. He was a member of the Hamilton Odd Fellows Lodge, and he died in 1941.

The house was designed in the Colonial Revival and Queen Anne architectural styles. It has been listed on the National Register of Historic Places since August 26, 1988.
