= E.G. Ellis House =

Historic house in Montana, United States

- E. G. Ellis House
- U.S. National Register of Historic Places
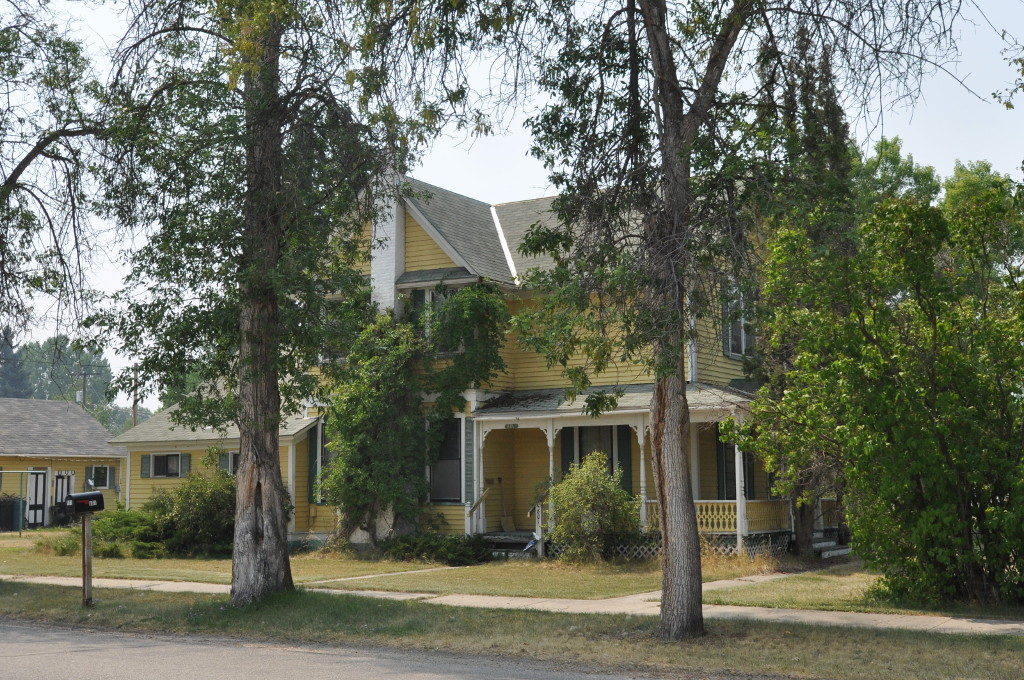

- Location within Montana Location within the United States
- Location: 801 North Third, Hamilton, Montana
- Coordinates: 46°15′17″N 114°09′32″W
- Area: less than one acre
- Built: 1900
- Architectural style: Colonial Revival, Queen Anne
- MPS: Hamilton MRA
- NRHP reference No.: 88001281
- Added to NRHP: August 26, 1988

E.G. Ellis House is a historic house in Hamilton, Montana. It was built in 1900 for Sidney A. Wheeler, a Canadian farmer who owned a slaughterhouse. He was a member of the Hamilton Masonic Lodge and died in 1947.

The house was designed in the Colonial Revival and Queen Anne architectural styles. It has been listed on the National Register of Historic Places since August 26, 1988.
