= Erick Trosdahl House =

- U.S. National Register of Historic Places
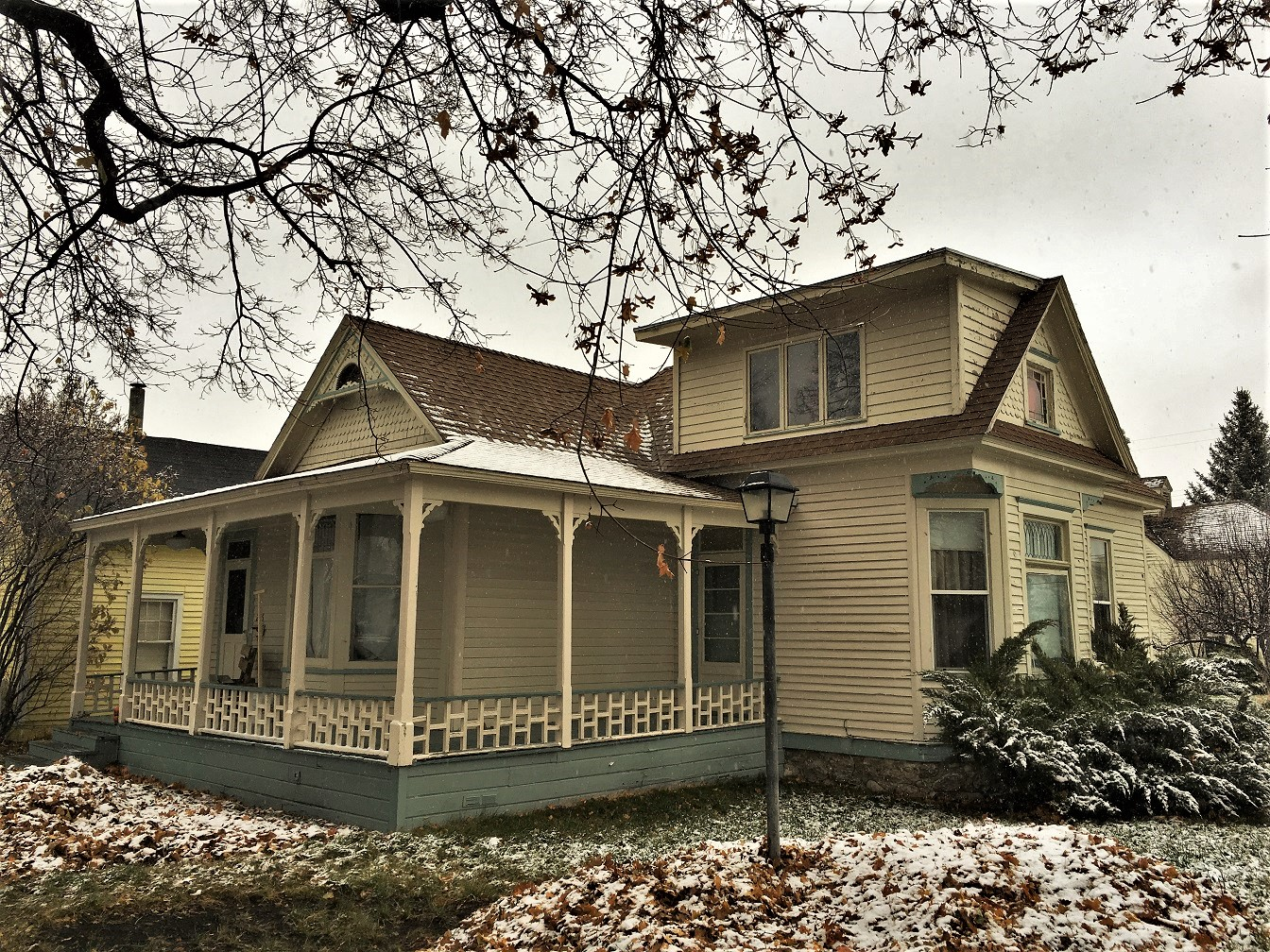

- Location within Montana Location within the United States
- Location: 206 South Seventh Street, Hamilton, Montana
- Coordinates: 46°14′43″N 114°09′46″W
- Area: less than one acre
- Built: 1892; 134 years ago
- Architectural style: Gothic, Queen Anne
- MPS: Hamilton MRA
- NRHP reference No.: 88001275
- Added to NRHP: August 26, 1988

The Erick Trosdahl House is a historic cottage in Hamilton, Montana. It was built in 1892 for an immigrant from Norway. It is listed on the National Register of Historic Places.

== History ==
The house was built in 1892 for Erick A. Trosdahl, an immigrant from Norway. Trosdahl emigrated to the United States in 1888, and he lived in Minneapolis, Minnesota and Missoula, Montana until 1891, when he moved to Hamilton. A carpenter by trade, he built many houses in Hamilton. Trosdahl played an active role in Hamilton politics, and he was elected to serve on the Hamilton City Council in 1902–1904. He died in 1932.

Next to the main house, Trosdahl built a barn circa 1896. That building had fallen "in a state of disrepair" by the 1980s, when the house belonged to the Hochstetler family.

== Architectural significance ==
The house was designed in the Gothic and Queen Anne architectural styles. Given Trosdahl's role in building many houses in Hamilton, this house is representative of his work in Hamilton. It has been listed on the National Register of Historic Places since August 26, 1988.
