= Goff House (Hamilton, Montana) =

Historic house in Montana, United States

- U.S. National Register of Historic Places
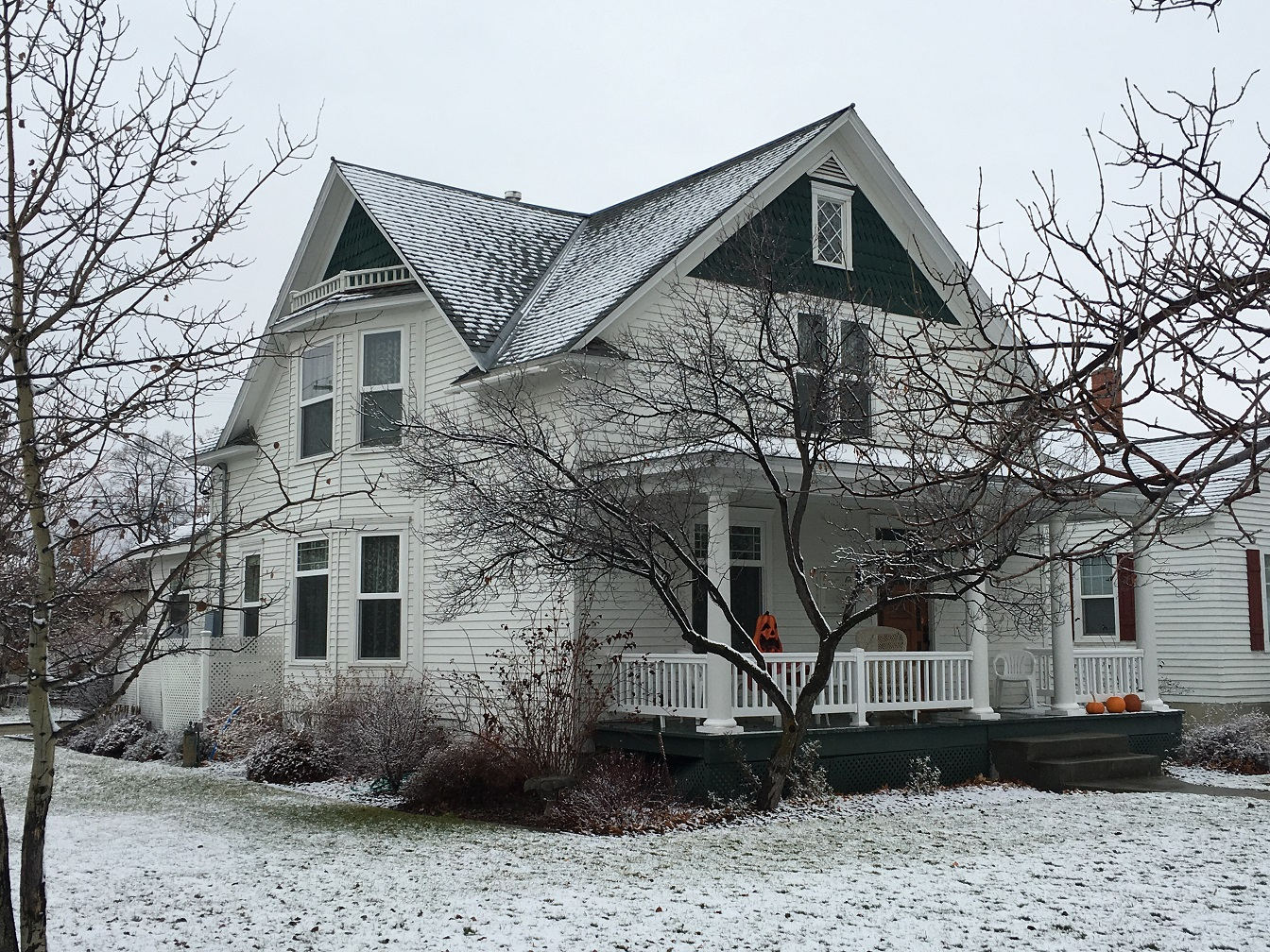

- Location within Montana Location within the United States
- Location: 115 North Fifth, Hamilton, Montana
- Coordinates: 46°14′50″N 114°09′39″W
- Area: less than one acre
- Built: 1910
- Architectural style: Colonial Revival, Queen Anne
- MPS: Hamilton MRA
- NRHP reference No.: 88001283
- Added to NRHP: August 26, 1988

The Goff House is a historic house in Hamilton, Montana. It was built in 1910 for Daniel T. Goff, a businessman. Goff was the manager of the Bitter Root Land and Development Company. In 1920, the house was later acquired by Mabel Robbins, the widow of county clerk Fred Robbins. By the 1980s, it belonged to the Roy family.

The house was designed in the Colonial Revival and Queen Anne architectural styles. It has been listed on the National Register of Historic Places since August 26, 1988.
