= El Capitan Lodge =

- U.S. National Register of Historic Places
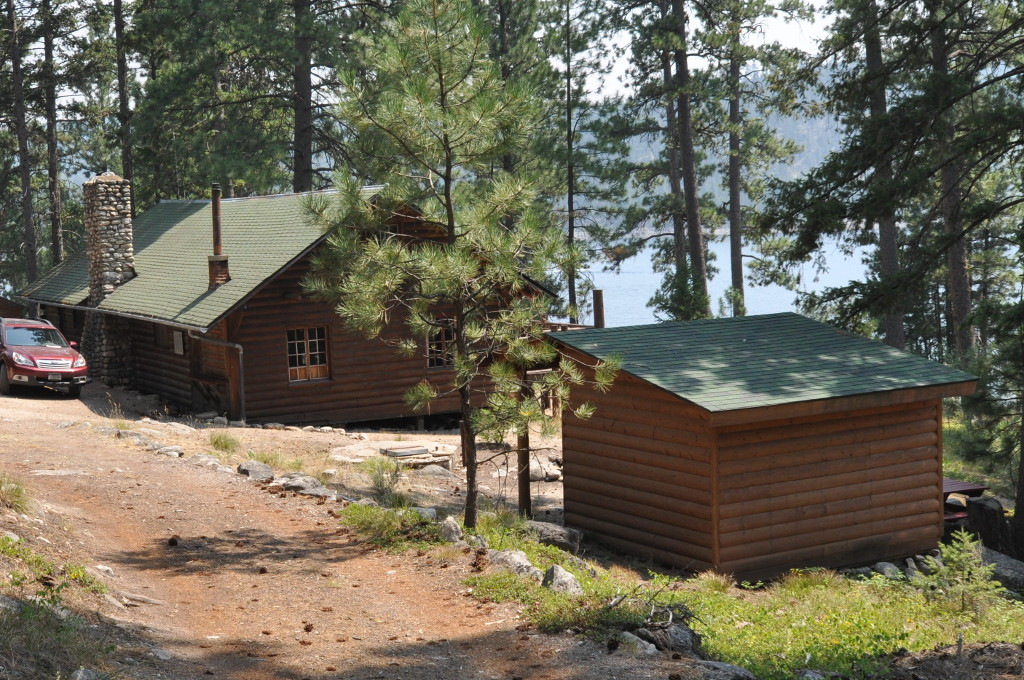

- Location within Montana Location within the United States
- Location: Access Rd. 1111 on the northern shore of Lake Como in the Bitterroot National Forest, near Hamilton, Montana
- Coordinates: 46°3′56″N 114°14′42″W
- Area: less than one acre
- Built: 1935
- Architect: Kramis, N.J.
- Architectural style: Rustic
- NRHP reference No.: 90001792
- Added to NRHP: November 29, 1990

The El Capitan Lodge is a Rustic-style lodge built in 1935 on Lake Como in the Bitterroot National Forest in Ravalli County, Montana. It was listed on the National Register of Historic Places in 1990.

It was "designed by N.J. Kramis and other charter members of the Hamilton Hikers' Club."
