= Other C. Wamsley House =

Historic house in Montana, United States

- U.S. National Register of Historic Places
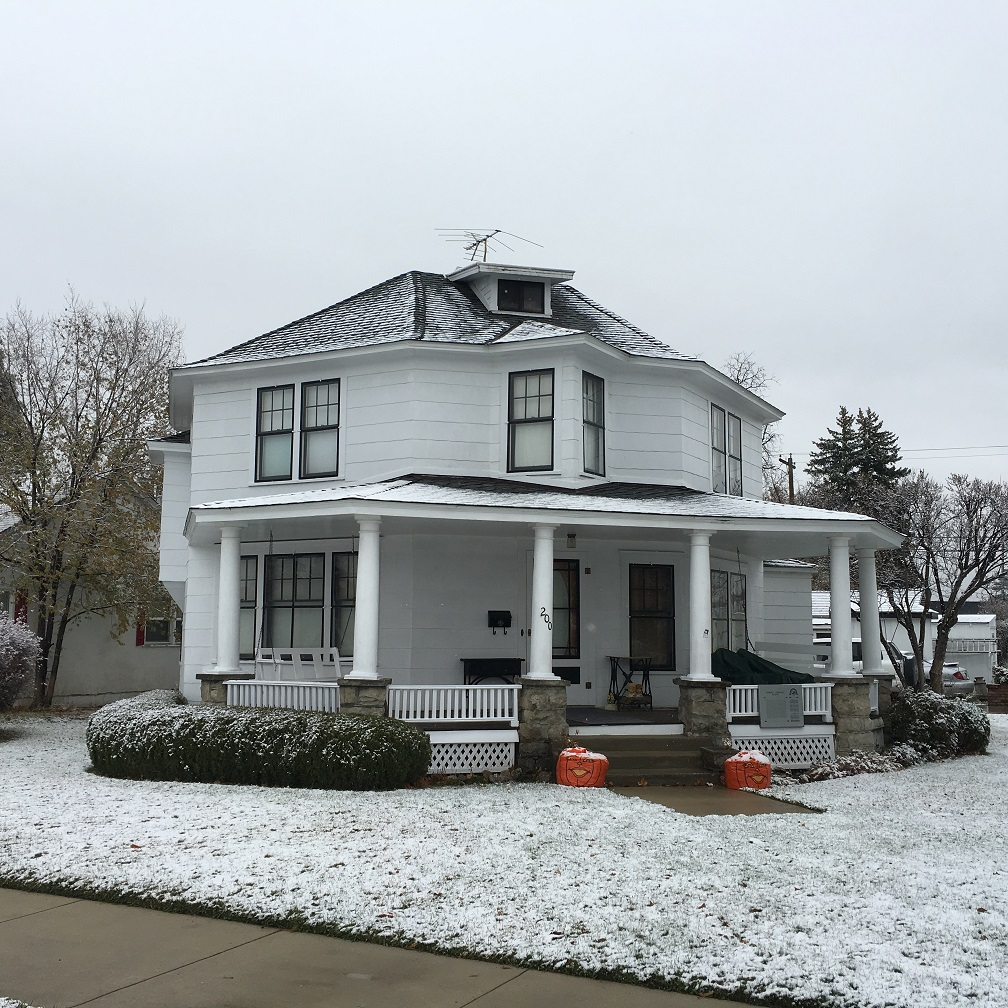

- Location within Montana Location within the United States
- Location: 200 N. 5th St., Hamilton, Montana
- Coordinates: 46°14′54″N 114°9′37″W
- Built: 1909
- Architect: Wamsley, Other C.
- Architectural style: Octagon Mode
- MPS: Hamilton MRA
- NRHP reference No.: 88001285
- Added to NRHP: August 26, 1988

The Other C. Wamsley House built in 1909 is an historic octagon house located at 200 North 5th Street in Hamilton, Montana, United States. On August 26, 1988, it was added to the National Register of Historic Places.

It is a two-story wood-frame house built on a rubble stone foundation. It has a wraparound front porch, and a one-story portion to the rear may once have been an open porch. Porch pillars are Doric columns on stone piers.

It was home for Other C. Wamsley, a contractor and carpenter, during 1908 to 1918. A 1987 inventory writeup notes:

The unusual architecture discloses the inquiring mind possessed by Mr. Wamsley who was also unafraid to attempt the unusual. Mr. Wamsley had served in the armed forces. He initiated the first civic Hallowe'en celebration here and the Community Sing during World War I.
