= Tibetan Language Institute =

- Established: 1996
- Affiliation: Vajrayāna Buddhism
- Administrative staff: David Curtis
- Location: Hamilton, Montana, United States
- Website: tibetanlanguage.org

The Tibetan Language Institute is a private, non-profit educational organization located in Hamilton, Montana. Its mission is to present classes, seminars, workshops, and public lectures on Tibetan language, literature, and philosophy for the purpose of preserving Tibetan culture and enriching one's study of the Dharma. The main program of study is a series of classes in the Tibetan language (available via distance learning or through private tutoring in person).
