= Lancaster Block =

Lancaster Block may refer to:

in the United States

(by state)

- Lancaster Block (Portland, Maine), listed on the National Register of Historic Places (NRHP) in Portland, Maine
- Lancaster Block (Lincoln, Nebraska), NRHP-listed
