= Whaley =

Whaley may refer to:

- Whaley, Derbyshire, a village in England
- Whaley (surname)
- Whaley Hall (1941–2015), an American football player

== See also ==
- Whaley Bridge, another town in Derbyshire, England
- Whaley House (disambiguation), several buildings
- Whaley Lake, a reservoir in Dutchess County, New York, United States
- Whaley Thorns, a village in Derbyshire, England, only one mile from Whaley
