= Methodist Episcopal Church South (Corvallis, Montana) =

Historic church in Montana, United States

- U.S. National Register of Historic Places
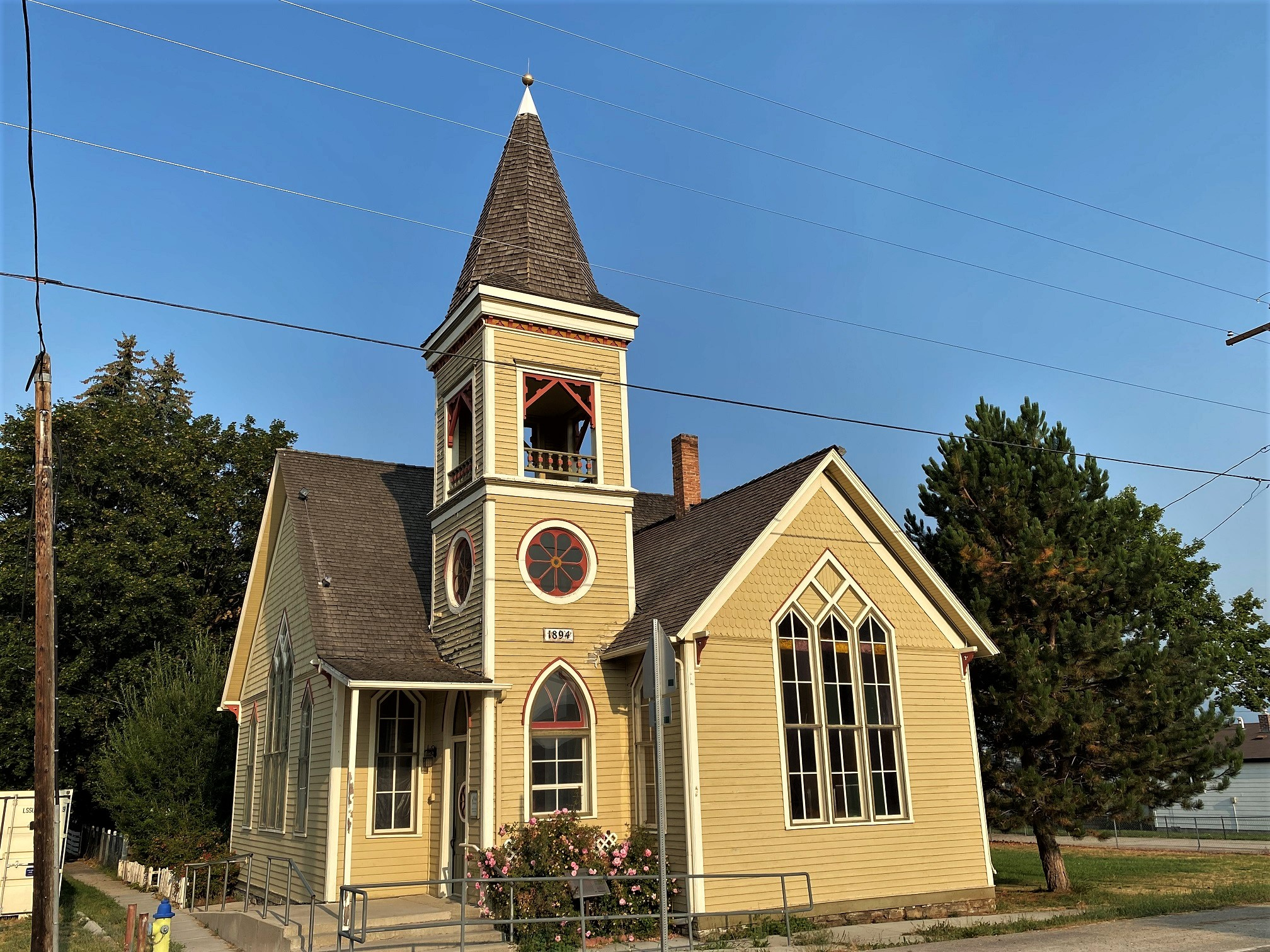

- Location within Montana Location within the United States
- Location: Jct. of First St. and Eastside Hwy., Corvallis, Montana
- Coordinates: 46°18′57″N 114°06′50″W
- Area: less than one acre
- Built: 1894
- Architectural style: Late Victorian, Gothic
- NRHP reference No.: 97001453
- Added to NRHP: November 24, 1997

The Methodist Episcopal Church South, also known as the Corvallis United Methodist Church, is a historic Methodist church at the junction of Cemetery Road (formerly First Street) and Eastside Highway in Corvallis, Montana. The church, built in 1894, was organized as a congregation of the old Methodist Episcopal Church, South, which in 1939 merged with what is now the United Methodist Church. On November 24, 1997, the church building was added to the National Register of Historic Places.
