= Brooks Hotel =

- U.S. National Register of Historic Places
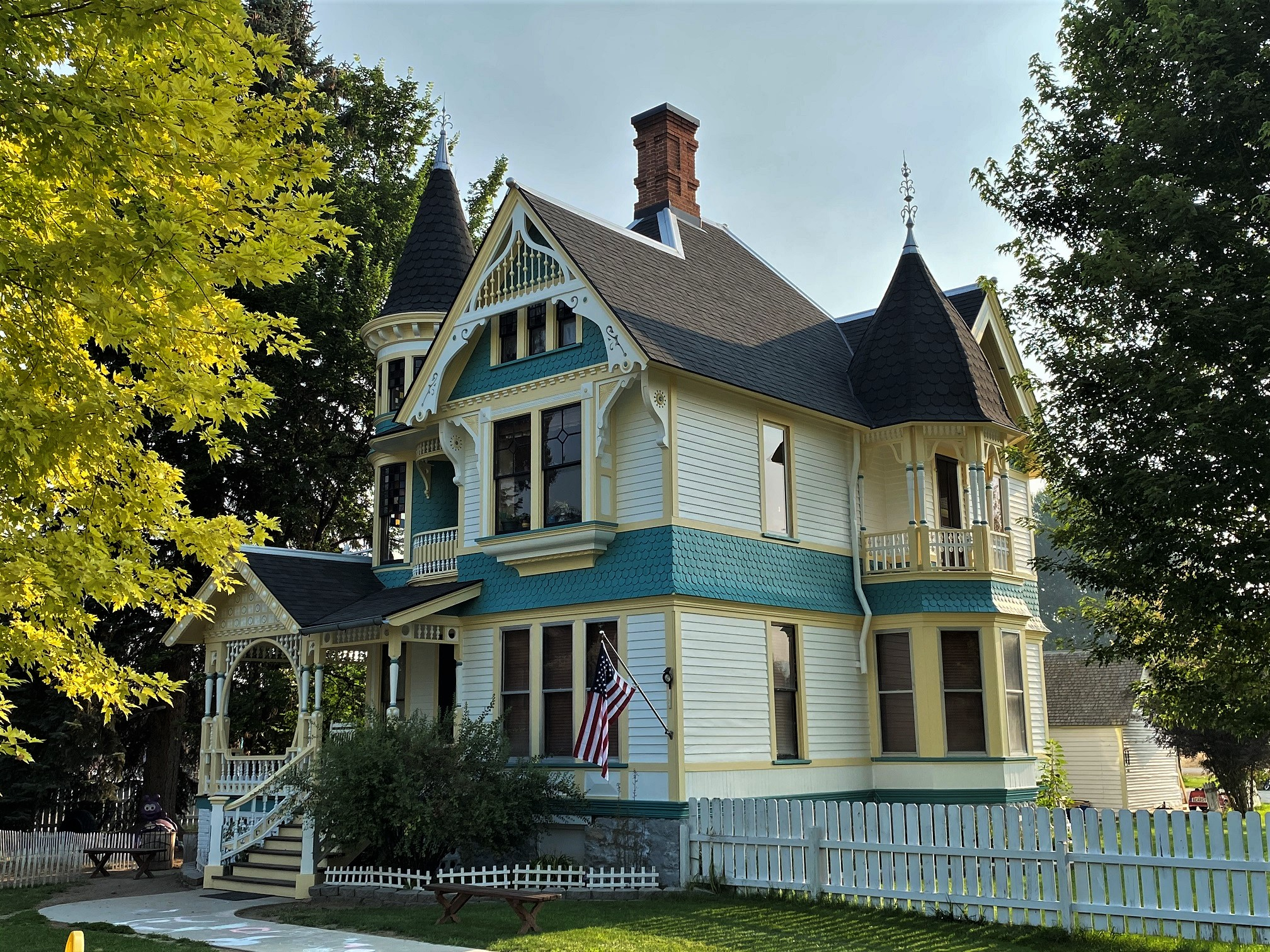

- Location within Montana Location within the United States
- Location: Off East Side Hwy. Corvallis, Montana
- Coordinates: 46°18′46″N 114°6′44″W
- Area: less than one acre
- Built: 1894
- Built by: James Barr
- Architectural style: Queen Anne
- NRHP reference No.: 80002430
- Added to NRHP: November 10, 1980

The Brooks Hotel, located off the East Side Highway in Corvallis, Montana, is a historic hotel built in 1894. It was listed on the National Register of Historic Places in 1980.

It was built in Queen Anne-style as the residence of George Dougherty, a merchant in Corvallis. It is "composed of numerous catalogue-ordered sections" and is described in its NRHP nomination "as an intriguing architectural landmark in the Bitterroot Valley".

Lula Brooks bought the home in 1916 and turned it into a hotel. Her daughters and granddaughters, the Swanson sisters, cooked in the hotel until 1975. In 2016 Nora Cassens purchased the property updated it and turned it into a successful daycare. The barn behind the school was also renovated and is the location of the pre-school program of the business. There is a walkthrough on youtube.
