= Emhoff House =

Historic house in Montana, United States

- U.S. National Register of Historic Places
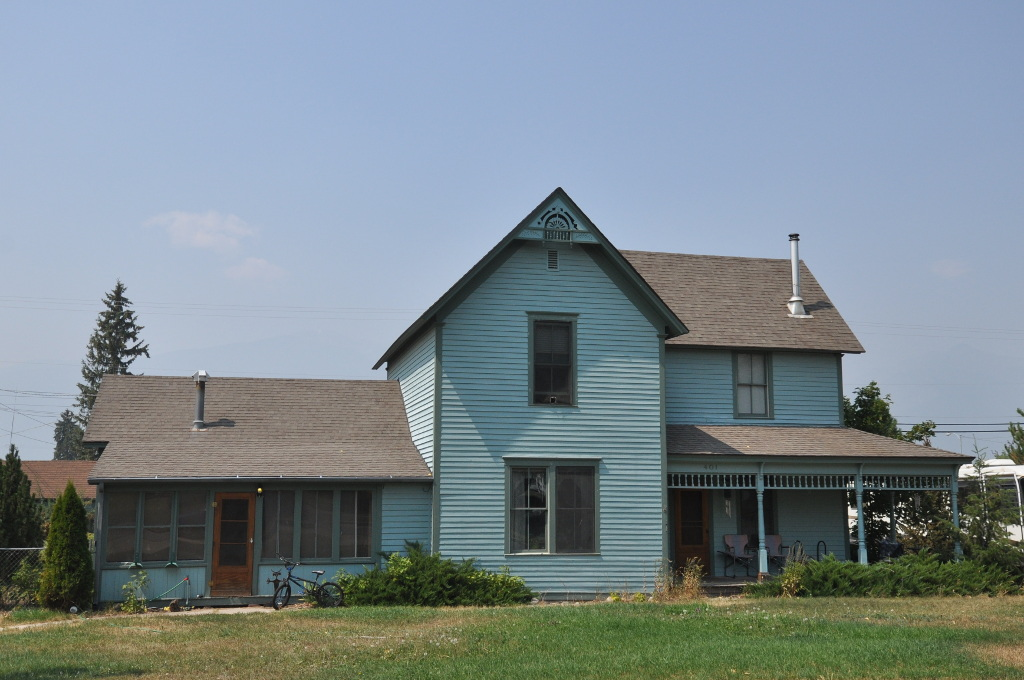
- The house in 2017

- Location within Montana
- Location: 401 Church Street, Stevensville, Montana
- Coordinates: 46°30′29″N 114°05′31″W
- Area: less than one acre
- Built: 1902
- Built by: W.E. Godfried (1904 addition)
- Architectural style: Vernacular gabled-ell
- MPS: Stevensville MPS
- NRHP reference No.: 91000736
- Added to NRHP: June 19, 1991

The Emhoff House is a historic house in Stevensville, Montana. It was built in 1902 for John C. Emhoff, the owner of the Stevensville Stage and Transport Company. Emhoff lived here with his wife and their twin daughters. He was a Freemason, and he died in 1930. One of his daughters, Elizabeth, inherited the house and lived here with her husband, Lawrence Saltz. The house was subsequently purchased by the Golder family. It has been listed on the National Register of Historic Places since June 19, 1991.
