= Charles Granke House =

Historic house in Montana, United States

- U.S. National Register of Historic Places
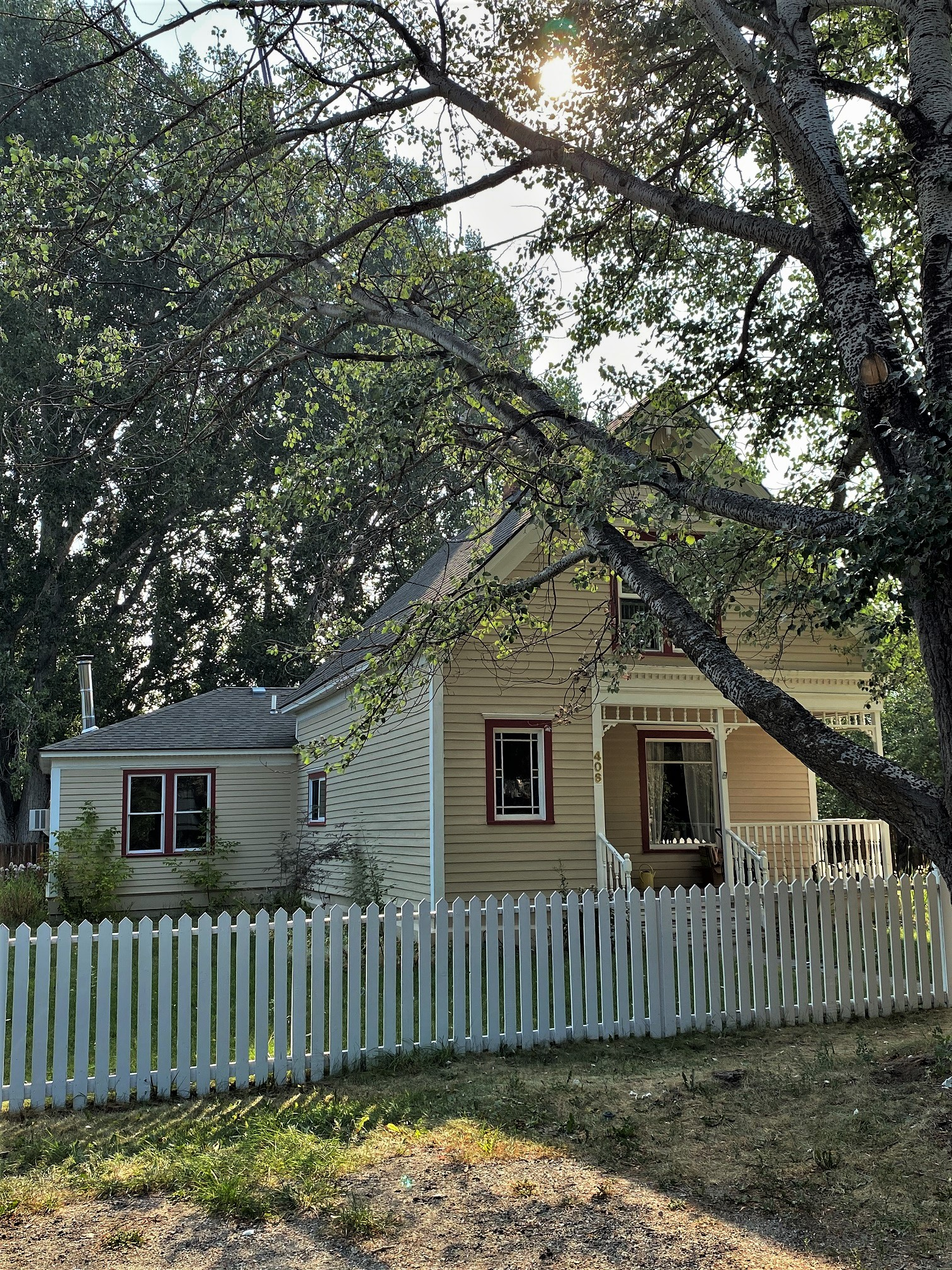

- Location within Montana Location within the United States
- Location: 406 S. Seventh St. Hamilton, Montana
- Coordinates: 46°14′36″N 114°9′45″W
- Area: less than one acre
- Built: c.1906
- Built by: Anaconda Copper Mining Co.
- Architectural style: Colonial Revival, Queen Anne
- MPS: Hamilton MRA
- NRHP reference No.: 88001278
- Added to NRHP: August 26, 1988

The Charles Granke House, at 406 S. Seventh St. in Hamilton, Montana, is a historic house that was built in 1906. It includes Colonial Revival and Queen Anne architecture. It was listed on the National Register of Historic Places in 1988. The listing included two contributing buildings.

It was built in approximately 1906 by the Anaconda Copper Mining Company as a worker cottage, for workers at the sawmill that operated in Hamilton until 1915. Charles W. Granke, one of two sawyers at the mill, "obtained title" to the home in 1906. It has been described as a "charming home" offers an unusually well-preserved example of the turn-of-the-twentieth-century transition between [Colonial Revival and Queen Anne] styles. While symmetrical lines, vertical corner board trim, and return gable ends reveal influence of the newer Colonial Revival style, the home is rich in Queen Anne detailing: scroll brackets, abundant decorative molding, and turned spindles above the porch. The cutaway porch itself is of special interest because it is a feature that rarely survives intact in Montana, where enclosures offer added weather protection."

The second building included in the listing is a carriage house, which dates also to c.1906, and is "an excellent example of a functional, vernacular outbuilding with few decorative embellishments".
