= John Stout House =

Historic house in Montana, United States

- U.S. National Register of Historic Places
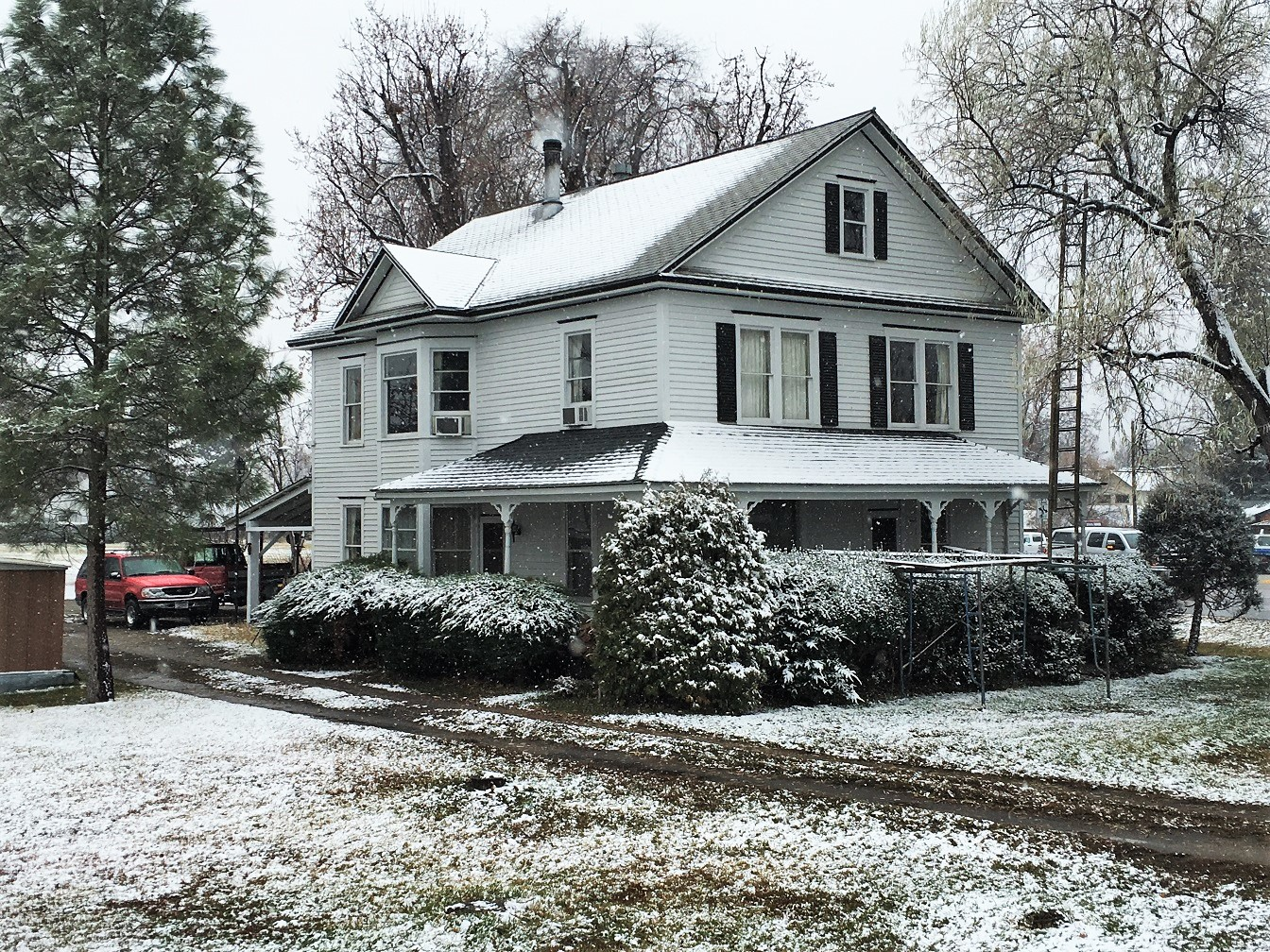

- Location within Montana Location within the United States
- Location: 1000 South First, Hamilton, Montana
- Coordinates: 46°14′13″N 114°09′11″W
- Area: less than one acre
- Built: 1900
- Architectural style: Colonial Revival, Queen Anne
- MPS: Hamilton MRA
- NRHP reference No.: 88001290
- Added to NRHP: August 26, 1988

The John Stout House is a historic house in Hamilton, Montana. It was built in 1900 for John Stout, a farmer from Missouri. In 1910, it was inherited by his daughter Josephine, who lived here with her husband, John McClintic. The latter worked for copper baron Marcus Daly.

The house was designed in the Colonial Revival and Queen Anne architectural styles. It has been listed on the National Register of Historic Places since August 26, 1988.

In 2022, the house was moved approximately 140 yards to the Southeast to accommodate future commercial and residential expansions.
