= Conway House (Hamilton, Montana) =

Historic house in Montana, United States

- U.S. National Register of Historic Places
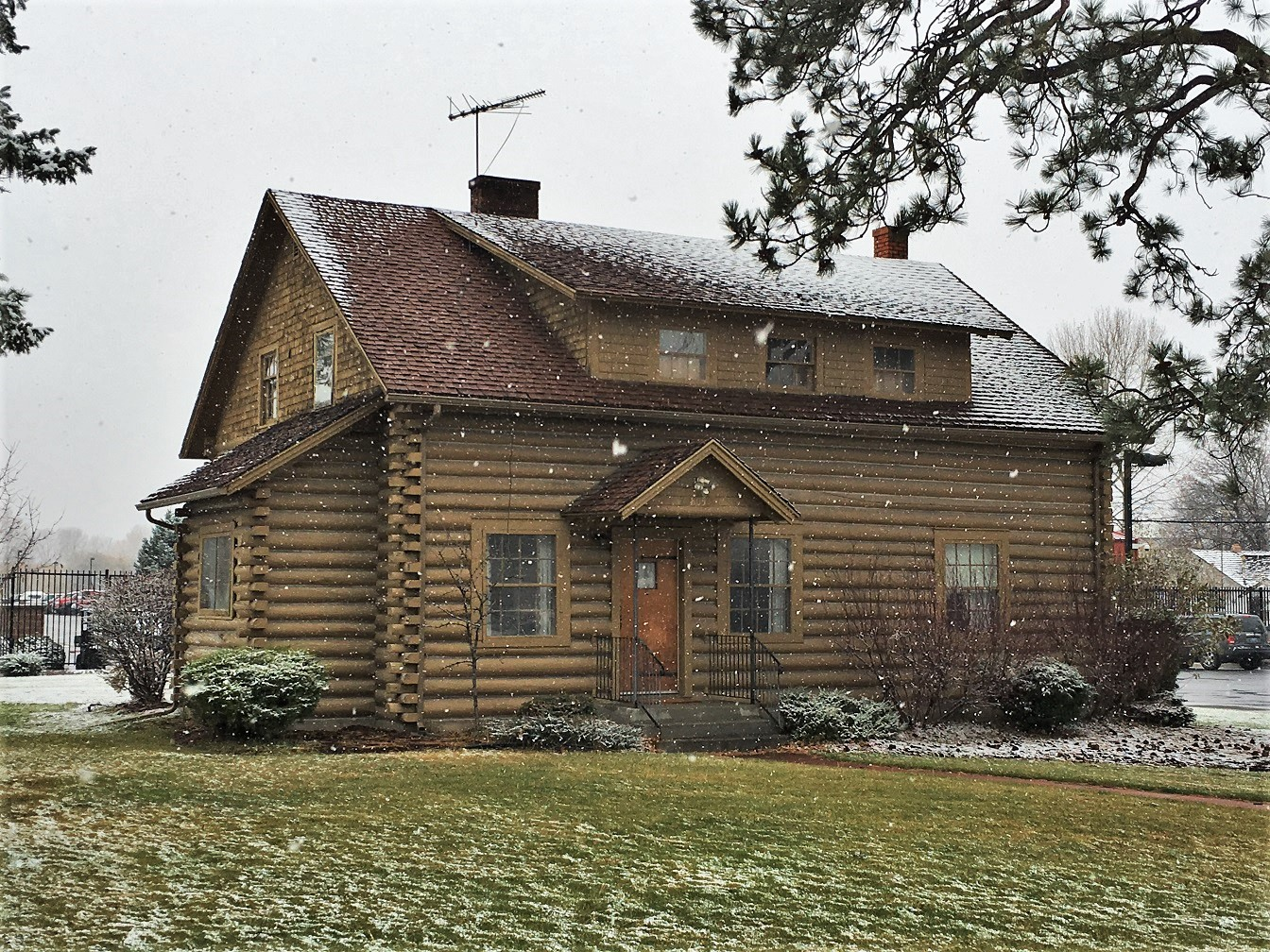

- Location within Montana Location within the United States
- Location: 805 South Fourth Street, Hamilton, Montana
- Coordinates: 46°14′20″N 114°09′32″W
- Area: less than one acre
- Built: 1930
- Architectural style: Bungalow/craftsman, Milled log house
- MPS: Hamilton MRA
- NRHP reference No.: 88001291
- Added to NRHP: August 26, 1988

The Conway House is a historic log house in Hamilton, Montana. It was built in 1930 for Grace L. Conway. By the 1980s, it belonged to the Tibbs family.

The house was designed in the American Craftsman style. It has been listed on the National Register of Historic Places since August 26, 1988.
