= Bitterroot Health-Daly Hospital =

- Marcus Daly Memorial Hospital
- U.S. National Register of Historic Places
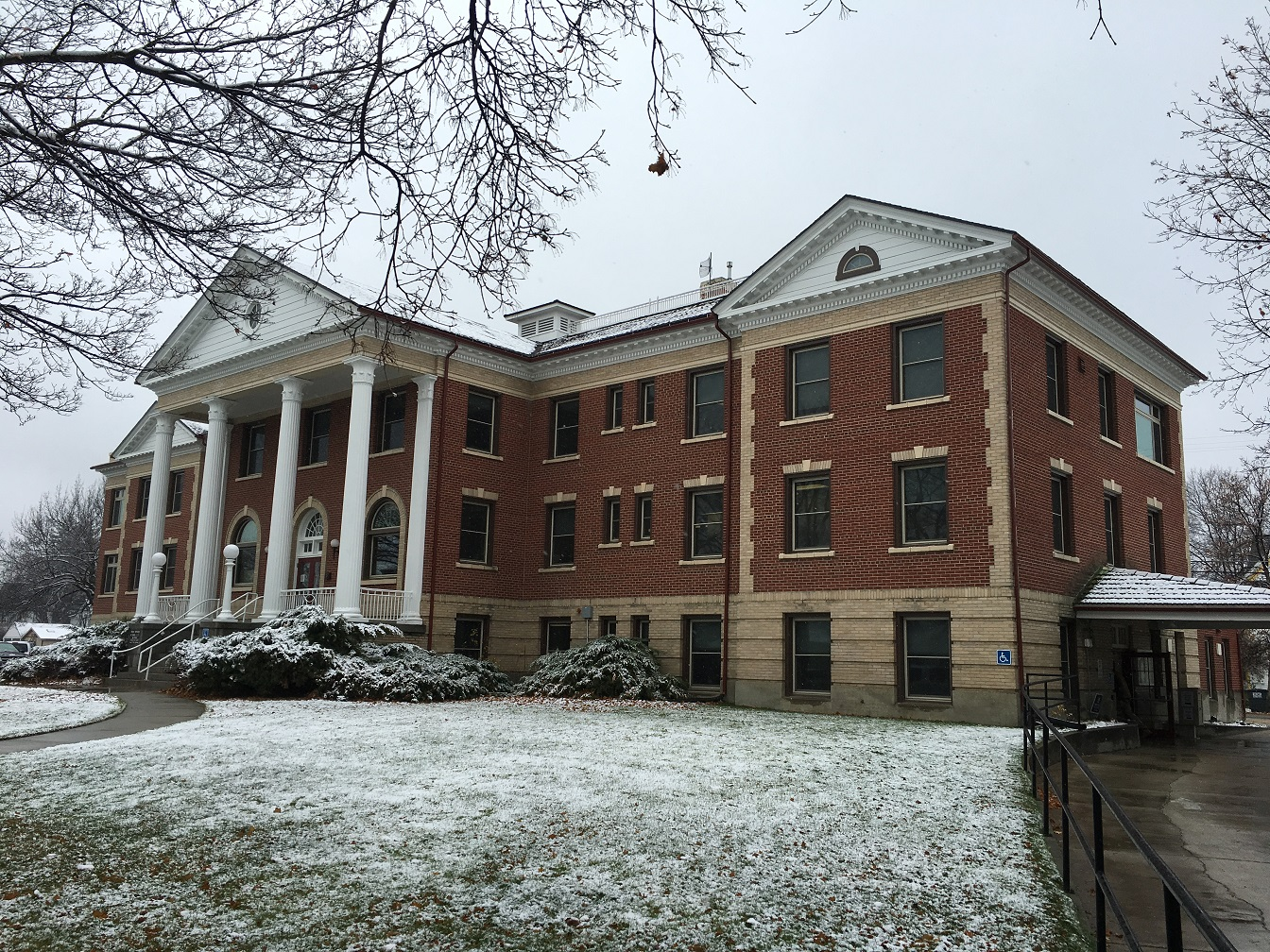

- Location within Montana Location within the United States
- Location: 211 S. 4th St., Hamilton, Montana
- Coordinates: 46°14′43″N 114°9′34″W
- Area: 1 acre (0.40 ha)
- Built: 1930
- Built by: Elliott Construction Co.
- Architect: Kirkemo, H.E.
- Architectural style: Colonial Revival
- NRHP reference No.: 78001690
- Added to NRHP: December 15, 1978

The Marcus Daly Memorial Hospital, located at 211 S. 4th St. in Hamilton in Ravalli County, Montana was listed on the National Register of Historic Places in 1978.

It was named in memory of Marcus Daly.
