= Frank Wallin House =

Historic house in Montana, United States

- U.S. National Register of Historic Places
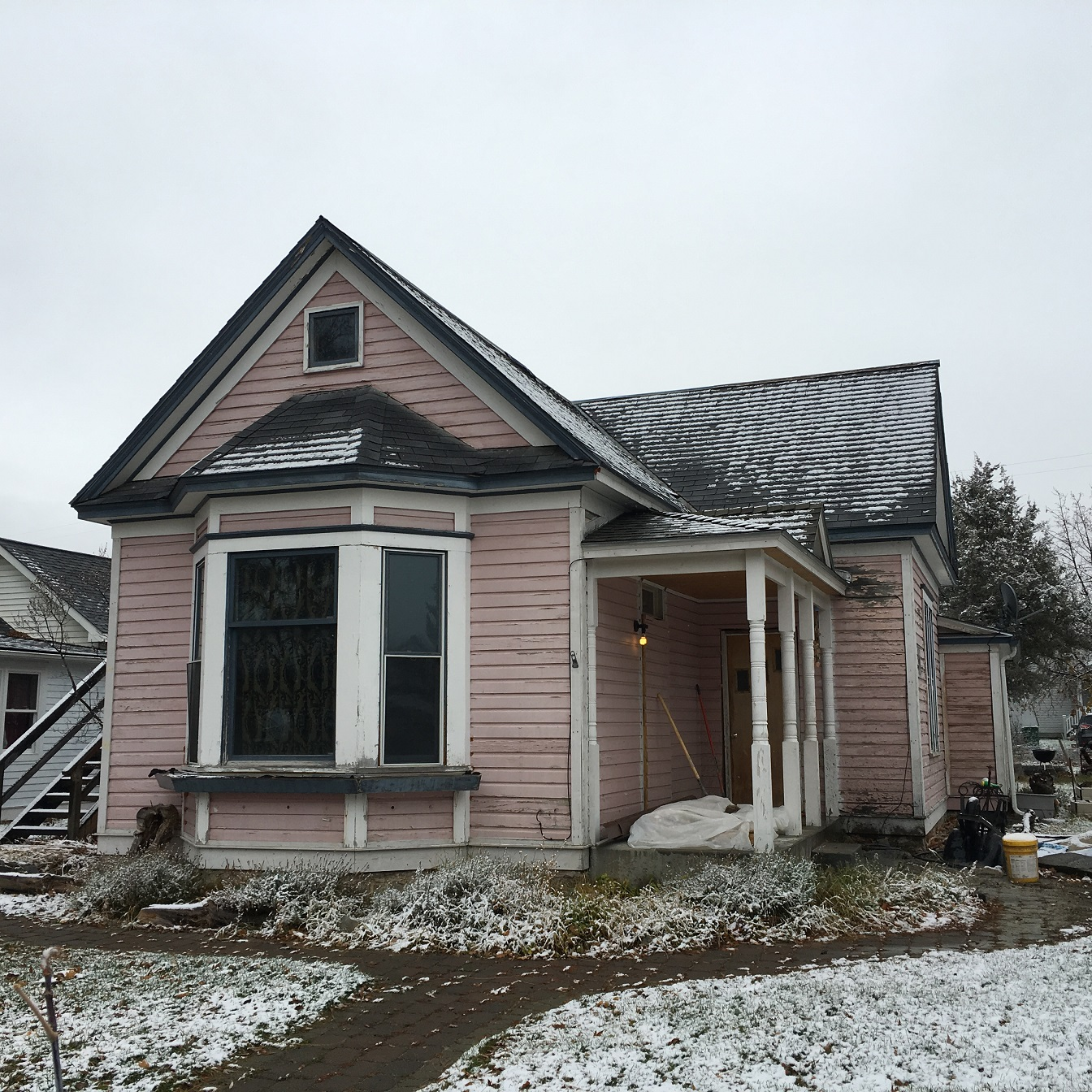

- Location within Montana Location within the United States
- Location: 608 N. Seventh St., Hamilton, Montana
- Coordinates: 46°15′8″N 114°9′51″W
- Area: less than one acre
- Built: 1897
- Architectural style: Colonial Revival, Queen Anne
- MPS: Hamilton MRA
- NRHP reference No.: 88001293
- Added to NRHP: August 26, 1988

The Frank Wallin House, at 608 N. Seventh St. in Hamilton, Montana, was built in 1897. It includes Colonial Revival and Queen Anne architecture. It was listed on the National Register of Historic Places in 1988.

It is described as having Queen Anne style elements including "the steeply pitched roof, placement of the porch, and spindled posts with decorative brackets", while Colonial Revival elements are the "hip roof of the porch and its triangular pediment". It was owned by Frank Wallin from 1900 to 1917. It is significant as "a classic example of working-class housing in Hamilton at the end of the nineteenth century."
