= Ravalli County Museum =

Coordinates: 46°14′40″N 114°09′28″W

The Ravalli County Museum in Hamilton, Montana, is operated by the Bitter Root Valley Historical Society (BRVHS) in order to acquire, preserve, and interpret the historical and cultural heritage of the Bitter Root Valley and the inhabitants of Ravalli County, Montana. United States. The Museum is open year-round and features three main focal points: local history, natural history and art.

== Exhibits ==
Ravalli County Museum has a total of 9 exhibit galleries, with five of the galleries housing permanent exhibits.

“The Discovery: Lewis & Clark Meet the Salish in the Bitter Root,” is a display that depicts the story of the historic encounter between the Bitterroot Salish and Meriwether Lewis and William Clark in the Bitterroot Valley, just before they crossed the Continental Divide in 1805. The exhibit is made up of murals, copies of pages from the Lewis and Clark Journals, Native American artifacts, the local flora and fauna and replicas of the equipment used on the Lewis and Clark Expedition.

The "National Senior Pro Rodeo Hall of Fame" is a collection of rodeo items from Hall of Fame inductees combined with interpretations that tell the story of rodeo and the lifestyle of the American cowboy.

“A Walk Through the Bitter Root,” is a two-room exhibit featuring murals of the landscape of Darby, Conner, Sula, and Hamilton as it looked in the 1900s, painted by local artist Suzette DelRae. The exhibit also features agricultural artifacts, old maps and dioramas depicting the lifestyle of the pioneers that settled in the valley.

“Bertie Lord, Pioneer Photographer” displays artifacts from the collections of Bertie Lord, donated to the Museum by the Lord family. Photo equipment, memorabilia and prints from the late 1800s to the early 1900s, including stereo views, portray the hobby that was Bertie Lord’s passion.

The Natural History Exhibit features a collection of wildlife from Western Montana including a white wolf, hawk, eagle and elk. There is also a wide variety of fly fishing ties from the 1920s and fishing party photos from the late 1800s.

The "Trapper and Miner Exhibit", created with artifacts from the 1800s and 1900s, depicts the lifestyle of a miner or trapper living in the Bitterroot Mountains at that time. The exhibit is made to look like the inside of a one-room log cabin complete with stove, bed, furs and mining and trapping equipment. The exhibit also houses a chair that was hand made by Father Antonio Ravalli.

Rotating exhibits are featured in three of the small galleries and the main gallery; the “Old Courtroom” features large rotating exhibits of community interest throughout the year. The Museum hosts traveling exhibits throughout the year as well as lectures on topics of local interest.

== History ==
In 1955, the Bitter Root Valley Historical Society founded a small historical museum which was operated out of the old train depot in Hamilton, Montana. Upon demolition of the depot, the museum artifacts were moved into barns and basements of area residents.

In 1974, local officials planned to demolish the Ravalli County Courthouse, designed and built in 1900 by architect, A.J. Gibson. The Bitter Root Valley Historical Society successfully advocated for the repurposing the building as the new site of the Museum. The Ravalli County Museum opened its doors soon after. It now houses many historical collections from the Bitterroot Valley’s American Indian heritage and early settlers in the Bitterroot Valley. The building includes a Cold War-era bomb shelter which has been turned into a work area.

== Collections ==
Most of the collection of artifacts have been donated to the Bitter Root Valley Historical Society over many years. Many pioneer families contributed to the collection, including a variety of objects that were collected and donated by Henry Grant. Some of the other items on display are on loan from various contributors.

The permanent collection includes American Indian artifacts from local tribes such as the Interior Salish peoples, Crow, Nez Perce, and Kutenai Native Americans. There are also local agricultural, scientific tools, and collections associated with the homesteading of the valley along with military uniforms and accessories dating from the American Civil War era to Operation Desert Storm. A large collection of Victorian Era household fixtures, dry goods, vintage clothing, portraits and paintings, and various other articles make up the bulk of the holdings.

== Archives ==
The Ravalli County Museum houses a collection of archival material especially which is available to historical researchers, including vertical files of local documents and a newspaper collection with several rare original publications (dating as far back as 1880s). There is also a card catalogue with a listing of obituaries and various other topics, which are also included in a searchable database. As well as files of original documents of various types, there is a Hamilton Architectural Survey and a collection of local books.

== Annual events ==
The Annual McIntosh Apple Day Festival, begun in 1979, is a one-day event held in October to celebrate the Apple Boom of 1907 to 1911. The Museum staff and volunteers make and sell apple pies, apple butter, and other apple dishes. Up to 175 vendors from the Bitterroot Valley and other areas of Montana and Idaho set up booths on the streets surrounding the Museum.

Bitter Root Day, a Salish Culture themed festival, is held each June, and promotes the preservation of the Montana State flower, the bitterroot. Plants and seeds of the flower are sold with planting instructions. At the Art & Treasures Annual Appraisal Event, local residents bring in their own artifacts and collectibles to be appraised by a local appraiser. All profits from this event go to support the Museum and its mission.

In June, the Annual Afternoon of Cowboy Music & Poetry takes place on the lawn of the Museum. Guests sit on hay bales and listen to cowboy poets and musical performers as they depict the lifestyle of the cowboy through poetry and song.

Since 1992 the Museum has held an annual 'Photograph Montana' contest to raise funds for the preservation of the Ernst Peterson photograph collection. Professional and amateur photographers are invited every year to submit photos of Montana for a small fee for each photo. The photos are judged and ribbons and prizes are awarded to the winners during a special ceremony. All photos are featured in an exhibit in the Old Courtroom Gallery on the third floor of the Museum.
