= Pine Apartments =

- U.S. National Register of Historic Places
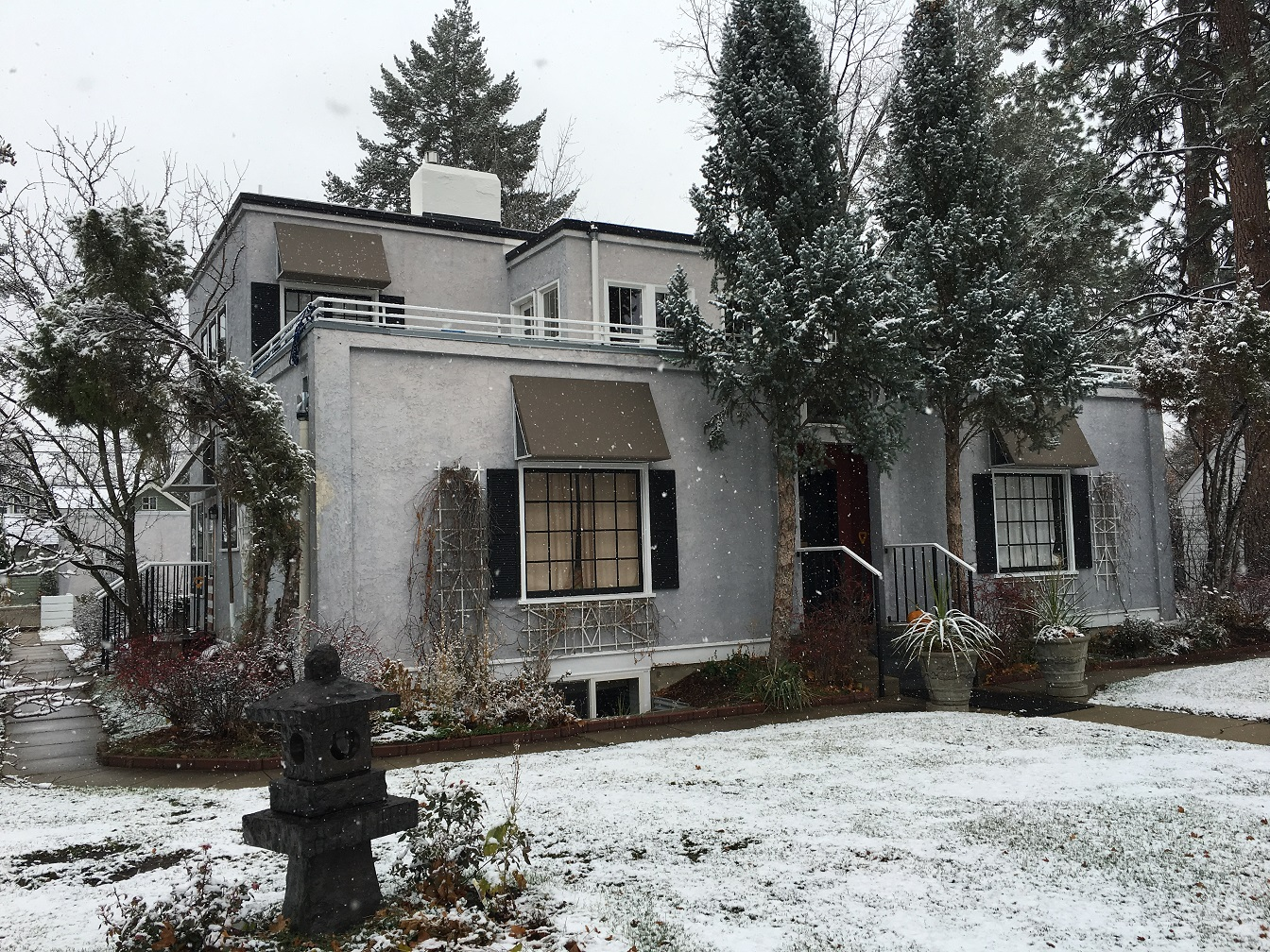

- Location within Montana Location within the United States
- Location: 804 S. Fourth St., Hamilton, Montana
- Coordinates: 46°14′20″N 114°09′29″W
- Area: less than one acre
- Built: 1936-38
- Built by: Leland Wells, Howard Bates
- Architectural style: Moderne
- MPS: Hamilton MRA
- NRHP reference No.: 88001295
- Added to NRHP: August 26, 1988

The Pine Apartments, at 804 S. Fourth St. in Hamilton, Montana, was built in 1936. The building was listed on the National Register of Historic Places in 1988.

It is a Moderne-style building with a stuccoed exterior and a flat roof. It employs a "concrete post and beam structural system with a stucco panel infill of the first floor" which was rarely used in residential construction.

Leland Wells began its construction in 1938, but the construction budget problems contributed to ownership going back to the Ravalli County Bank, which arranged for local contractor Howard Bates to complete the building, which was done in 1938.

A five-bay flat-roofed garage at the rear of the property is a second contributing building in the listing.
