= Williams House (Stevensville, Montana) =

Historic house in Montana, United States

- U.S. National Register of Historic Places
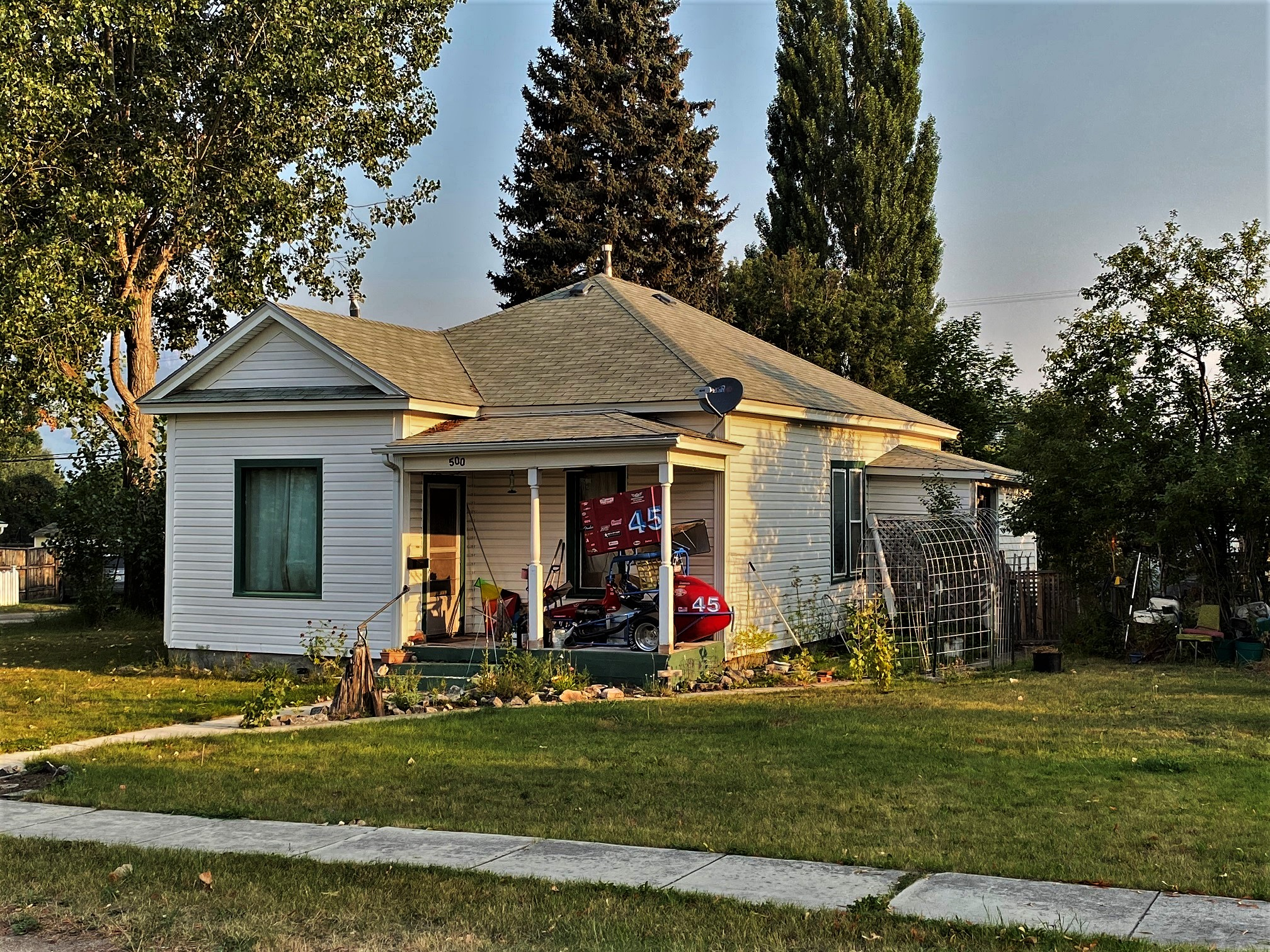

- Location within Montana Location within the United States
- Location: 500 Fifth St. Stevensville, Montana
- Coordinates: 46°30′23″N 114°05′11″W
- Area: less than one acre
- Built: 1903
- Architectural style: Queen Anne
- MPS: Stevensville MPS
- NRHP reference No.: 91000766
- Added to NRHP: June 19, 1991

The Williams House, at 500 Fifth St. in Stevensville, Montana, was built in 1903. It is a modest one-story cottage, with some degree of Queen Anne style, including decorative vergeboards. It was listed on the National Register of Historic Places in 1991.

A historic clapboard chicken coop, at the northeast corner of the property, was in poor condition in 1990 but was considered a second contributing building.
