= VFW Club =

- U.S. National Register of Historic Places
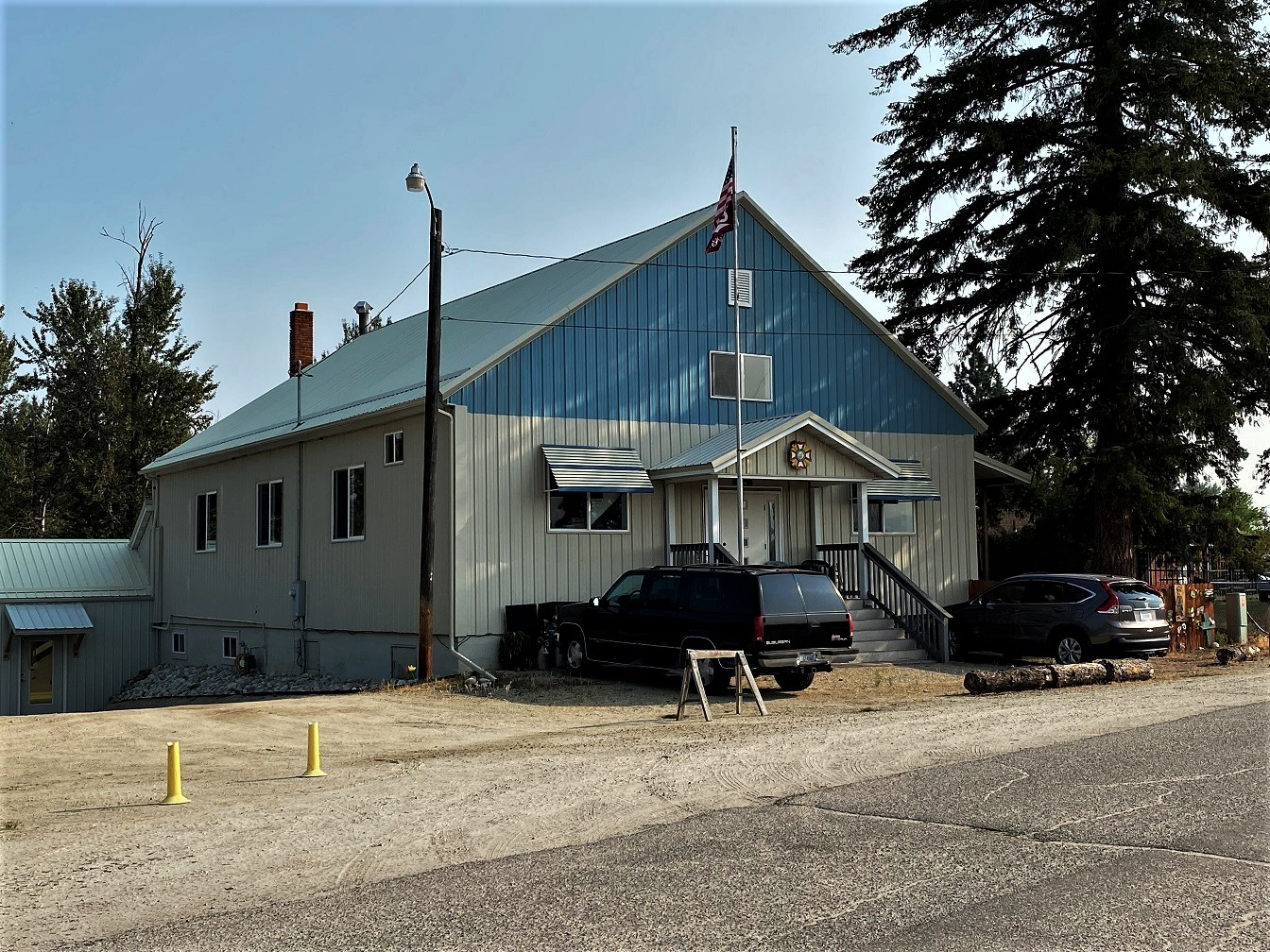

- Location within Montana Location within the United States
- Location: 930 Adirondac; Hamilton, Montana
- Coordinates: 46°15′18″N 114°10′16″W
- Area: less than one acre
- Built: c.1937
- Built by: Veterans of Foreign Wars Club
- Architectural style: Classicized Cape Cod Style
- MPS: Hamilton MRA
- NRHP reference No.: 88001287
- Added to NRHP: August 26, 1988

The building of the VFW Club (Veterans of Foreign Wars Club), at 930 Adirondac in Hamilton, Montana, US, was built in around 1937. It was listed on the National Register of Historic Places in 1988.

It is a one-and-a-half-story woodframe building, built by veterans of World War I, including Grundy Nichols who employed his team of horses and a slip to help excavate the basement. Early charter members also included Wilbur Vallance, Lawrence Waters, and Cecil Tucker.

Nichols' war service was in the Siberian Wolf Hound Division; he served for 13 months as a guard on the railroad going inland to "Lake Bycol" (sic, presumably meaning Lake Baikal, which was crossed by the Trans-Siberian Railway).
