= Lancaster Block (Lincoln, Nebraska) =

- U.S. National Register of Historic Places
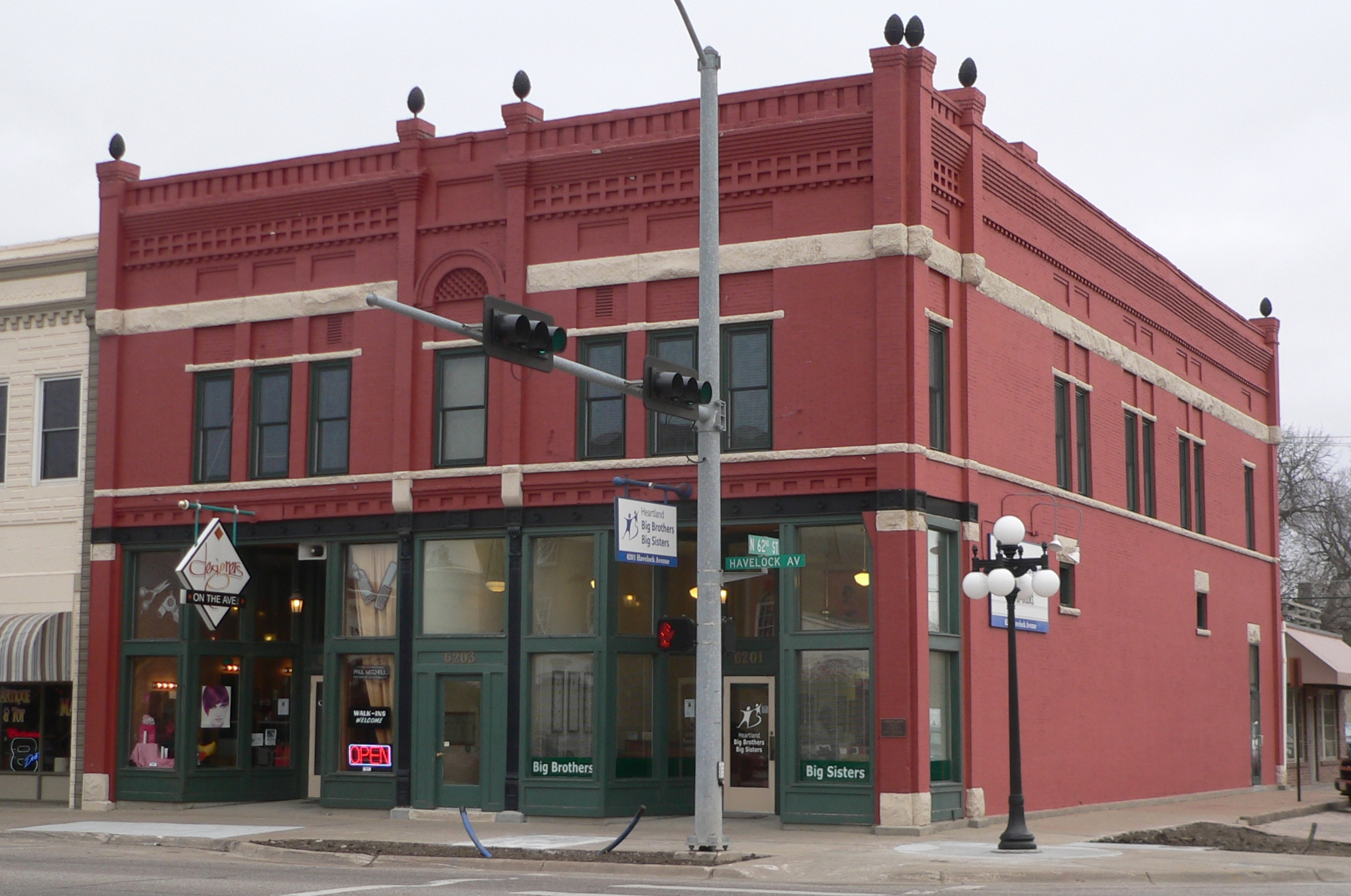

- Location within Nebraska Location within the United States
- Location: 6201--6205 Havelock Ave., Lincoln, Nebraska
- Coordinates: 40°51′24.7″N 96°38′8″W
- Built: 1891
- Architectural style: Romanesque Revival
- NRHP reference No.: 89000245
- Added to NRHP: April 12, 1989

The Lancaster Block in Lincoln, Nebraska was built in Romanesque Revival style in 1891 or before. It is also known as Jack & Jill Grocery Store.

It is historically associated with the rise of the town of Havelock, Nebraska and with its decline. For the rise, it was built by the Landcaster Land Company which founded the city and was built even before the city's incorporation. For the decline, it was site of meeting for local Great Northern railway shop workers and their vote to strike in the Great Railroad Strike of 1922. The strike's failure contributed to the decline of Havelock and its being absorbed into Lincoln in 1930.

It was listed on the National Register of Historic Places in 1989.
