= Martin Cramer House =

Historic house in Montana, United States

- U.S. National Register of Historic Places
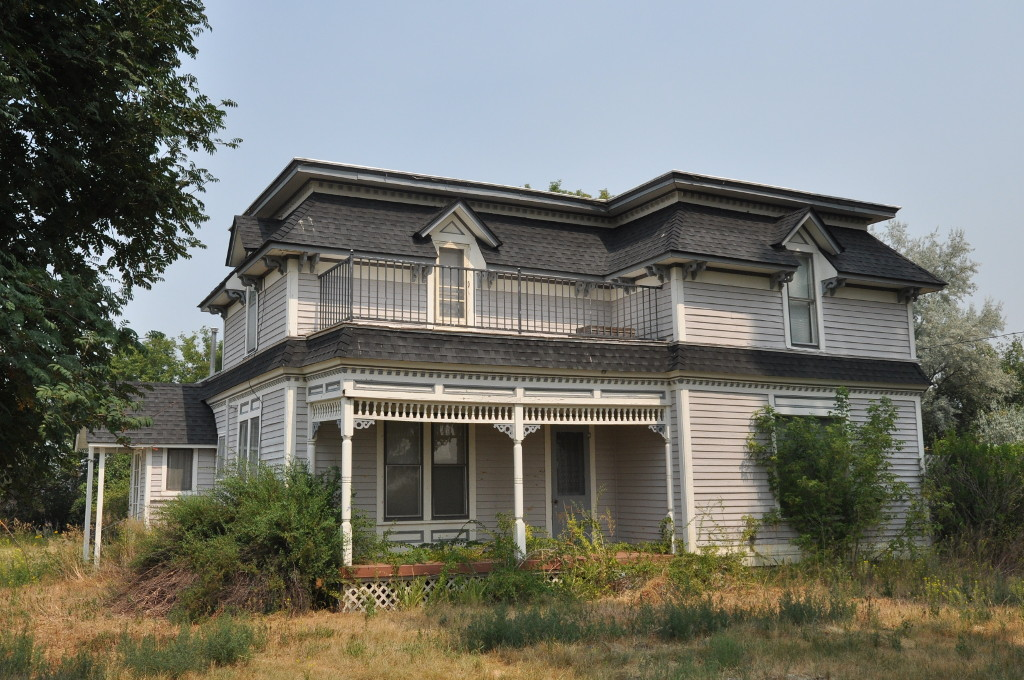

- Location within Montana Location within the United States
- Location: 326 Groff Lane, near Stevensville, Montana
- Coordinates: 46°25′32″N 114°4′51″W
- Area: 8 acres (3.2 ha)
- Built: 1893
- Built by: Erickson, Erick; Lagerquist, John
- Architectural style: Stick/eastlake, Second Empire
- NRHP reference No.: 87001259
- Added to NRHP: August 3, 1987

The Martin Cramer House, located near Stevensville, Montana, was built in 1893. It was listed on the National Register of Historic Places in 1987. The listing included six contributing buildings on 8 acres (3.2 ha).

The house is a two-story L-shaped eclectic-styled house with a mansard roof. It includes details from Second Empire architecture and Stick/Eastlake architecture. It was built by local carpenters Erick Erickson and John Lagerquist and "exhibits a high level of craftsmanship and material integrity".
