= Ravalli County Courthouse =

- U.S. National Register of Historic Places
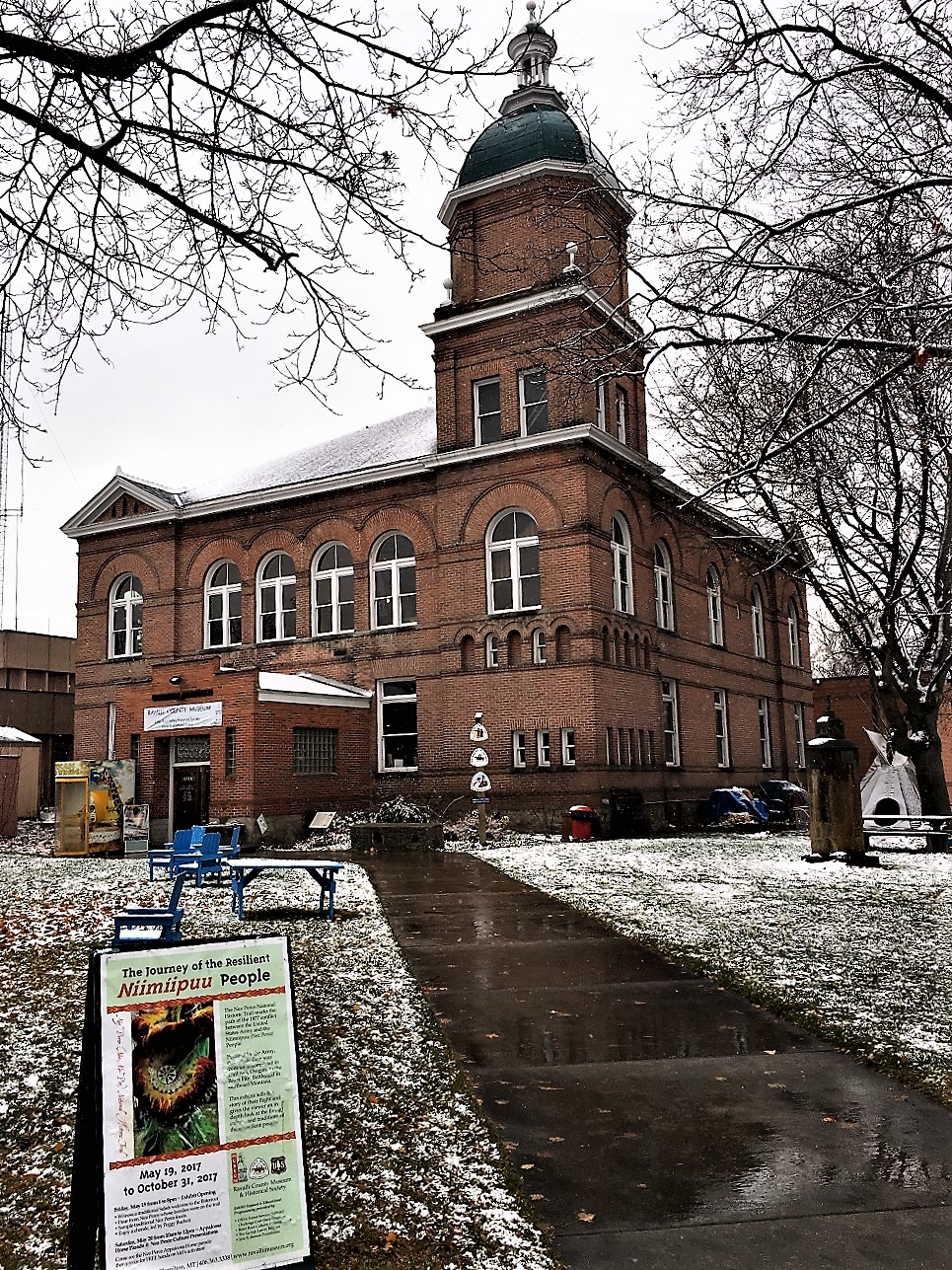

- Location within Montana Location within the United States
- Interactive map showing the location of Ravalli County Courthouse
- Location: 225 Bedford St., Hamilton, Montana
- Coordinates: 46°14′40″N 114°9′26″W
- Area: 0.5 acres (0.20 ha)
- Built: 1900
- Built by: Stabern, Charles
- Architect: Gibson, A.J.
- Architectural style: Classical Revival, Romanesque
- NRHP reference No.: 79001424
- Added to NRHP: April 20, 1979

The Ravalli County Courthouse, at 225 Bedford St. in Hamilton, Montana, was built in 1900. It includes Classical Revival and Romanesque architecture. It was listed on the National Register of Historic Places in 1979.

It was funded by a $20,000 bond issue and built on land donated by the Anaconda Copper Mining Company. It was designed by Missoula architect A.J. Gibson and built by Charles Stabern. It has been described as having a "stunning design [which] merges the Richardsonian Romanesque style with strong classical elements. The result is a pivotal example of the transition between nineteenth and twentieth century tastes. Graceful round-arched Romanesque style windows, popular in Victorian-era public architecture, blend with smooth wall surfaces and a horizontal orientation that reflects a newer trend toward classical styles. The tall corner tower visually interrupts the classical symmetry creating an artistic balance between old and new that is a credit to Gibson’s talent."

It was used as a courthouse from 1901 to 1974, and subsequently used as the Ravalli County Museum.
