= Lancaster House (Stevensville, Montana) =

Historic house in Montana, United States

- U.S. National Register of Historic Places
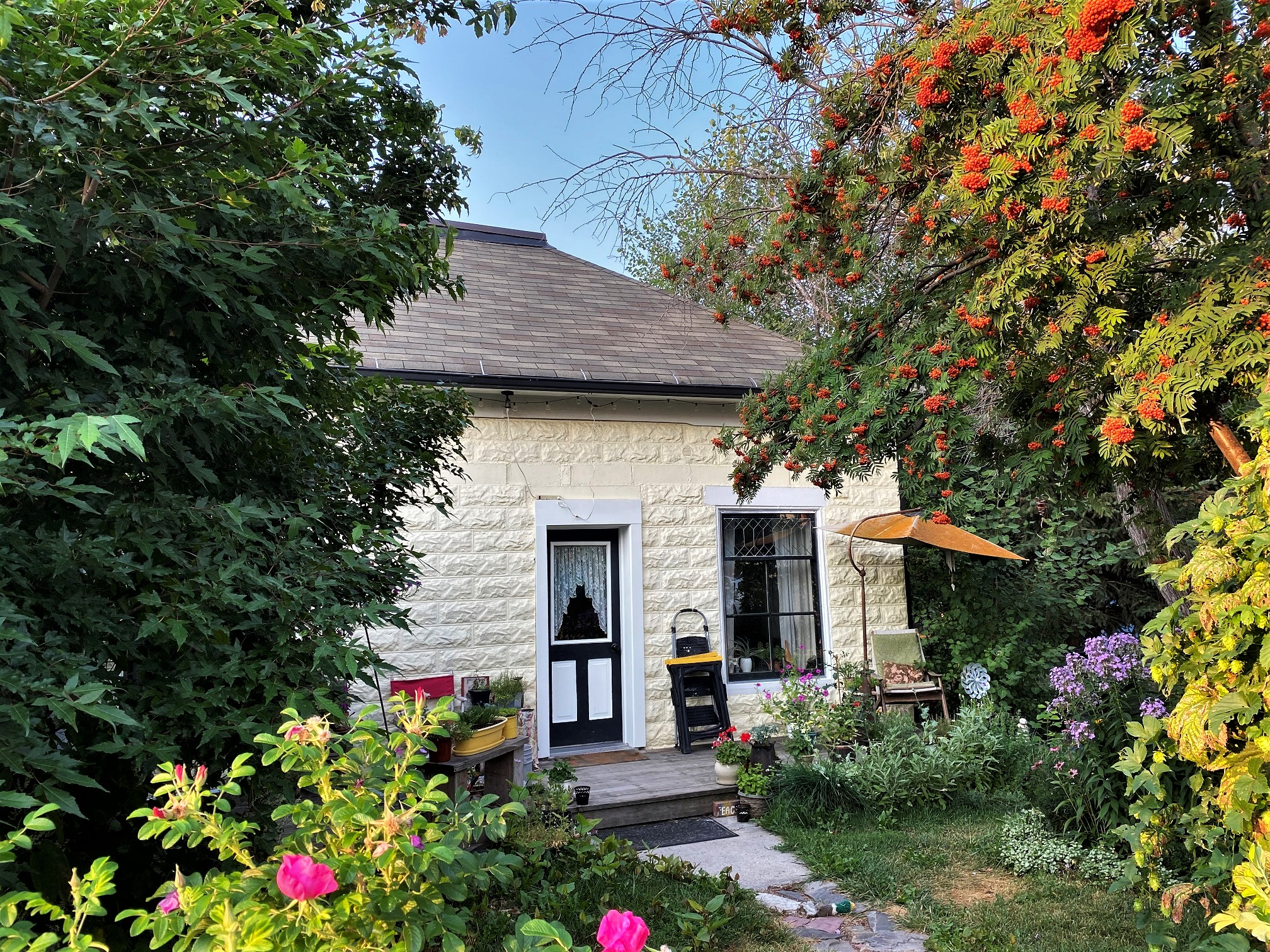

- Location within Montana Location within the United States
- Location: 407 Third St. Stevensville, Montana
- Coordinates: 46°30′33″N 114°5′16″W
- Area: less than one acre
- Built: 1909
- Built by: v Cannon
- Architectural style: Vernacular pyramidal cottage
- MPS: Stevensville MPS
- NRHP reference No.: 91000748
- Added to NRHP: June 19, 1991

The Lancaster House located at 407 Third St. in Stevensville, Montana is a vernacular pyramidal cottage built in 1909. It was listed on the National Register of Historic Places in 1991.

It was deemed notable "as a fine example of early 20th century cast concrete block construction in Stevensville. Constructed by David L. Cannon, it illustrates the techniques and craftsmanship employed by one of the most productive local contractors of the 1900s-1910s, as the local economy boomed, and the town grew rapidly." It has a truncated hipped roof.
