= Whaley Homestead =

- U.S. National Register of Historic Places
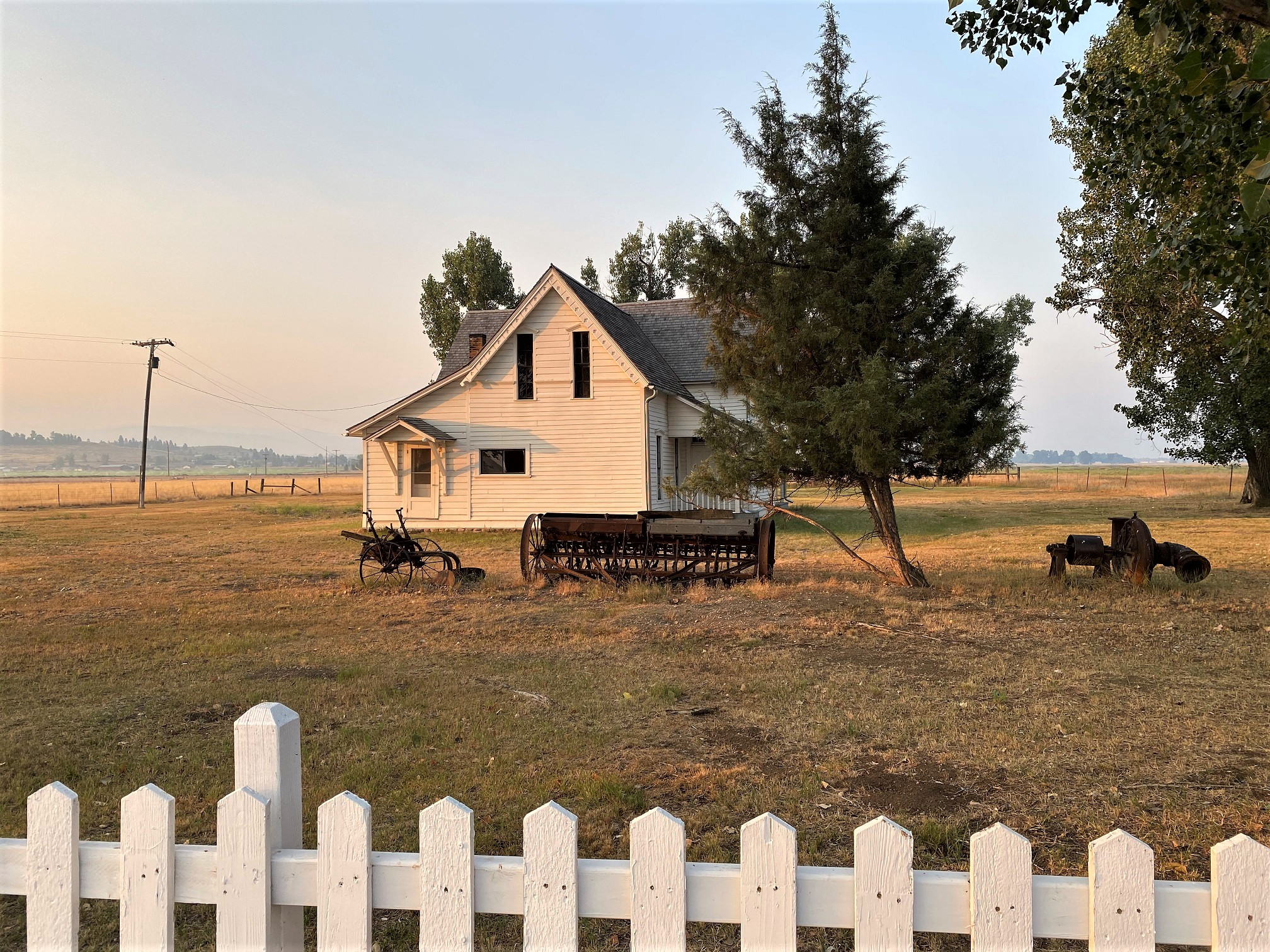

- Location within Montana Location within the United States
- Nearest city: Stevensville, Montana
- Coordinates: 46°33′03″N 114°04′36″W
- Area: 4 acres (1.6 ha)
- Built: c.1885
- Built by: Peter Whaley
- NRHP reference No.: 91000442
- Added to NRHP: March 26, 1992

The Whaley Homestead, in Ravalli County, Montana near Stevensville, Montana, was listed on the National Register of Historic Places in 1992. The listing included four contributing buildings and four contributing sites.

The property was settled by Peter Whaley in 1877. The first building on the site was a log house he built in 1879, which was used for many years as a secondary residence, but burned in 1916. He built the surviving large log-framed house by 1885. It is a two-story log building with pine and some larch weatherboard siding, built upon a rubble stone foundation. The framing employs square-hewn logs about 12 inches (0.30 m) wide, which are dovetailed and chinked with mortar. Absence of weathering suggests the siding was added soon after original construction.

There are three outbuildings and foundations of four other outbuildings included in the listing.

The property is located on Wildfowl Road west of the East Side Highway in the Lee Metcalf National Wildlife Refuge.
