= Hamilton, Montana =

City in Montana, United States

- City
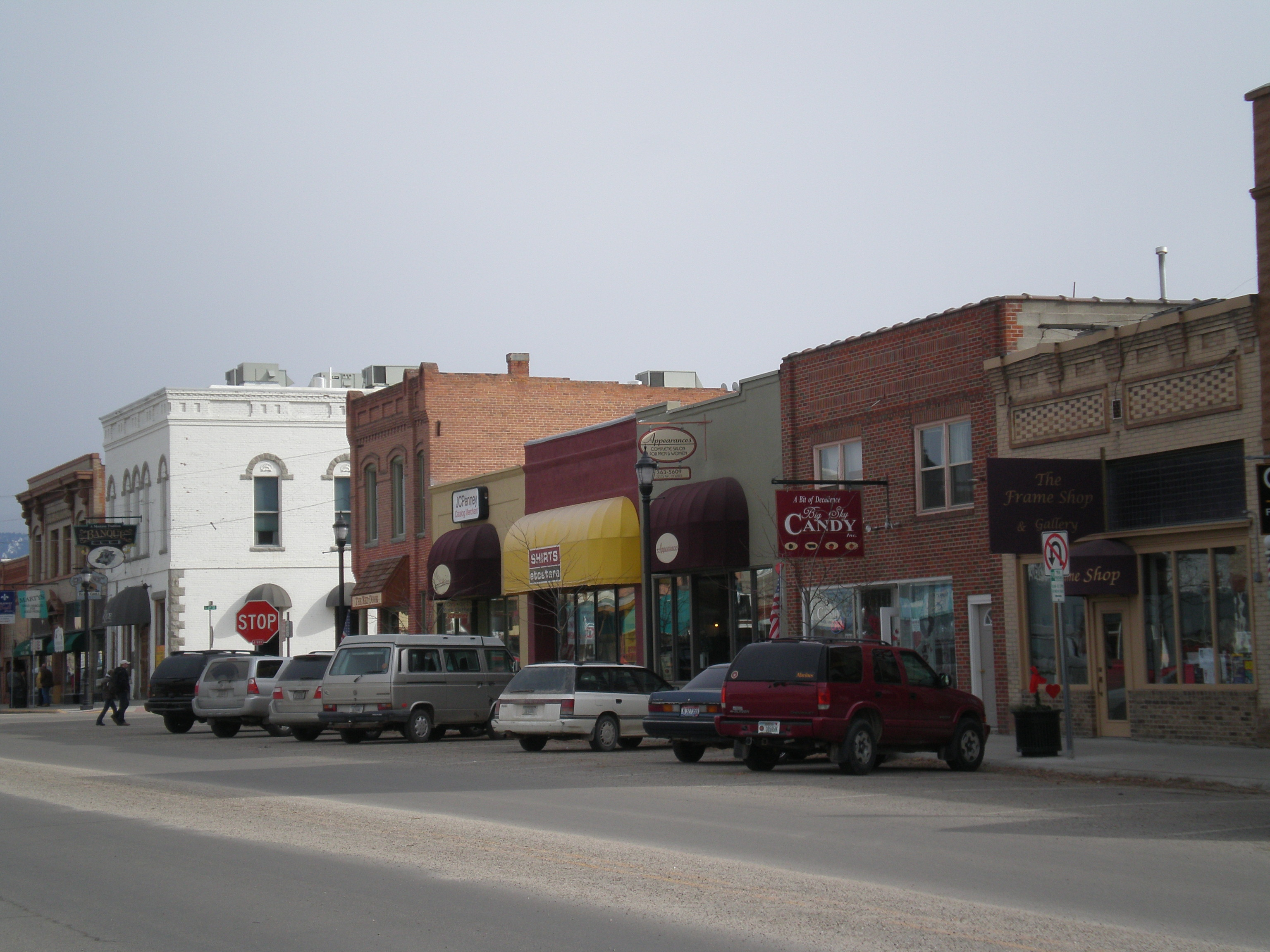
- Downtown Hamilton

- Location of Hamilton, Montana
- Coordinates: 46°14′54″N 114°09′40″W
- Country: United States
- State: Montana
- County: Ravalli

Government
  - Mayor: Dominic A Farrenkopf

Area
  - Total: 2.60 sq mi (6.73 km^{2})
  - Land: 2.54 sq mi (6.58 km^{2})
  - Water: 0.058 sq mi (0.15 km^{2})
- Elevation: 3,563 ft (1,086 m)

Population (2020)
  - Total: 4,659
  - Density: 1,832.9/sq mi (707.68/km^{2})
- Time zone: UTC−7 (Mountain (MST))
  - Summer (DST): UTC−6 (MDT)
- ZIP code: 59840
- Area code: 406
- FIPS code: 30-33775
- GNIS feature ID: 2410694
- Website: www.cityofhamilton.net

Hamilton is a city that serves as the county seat of Ravalli County, Montana, United States. The population was 4,659 at the 2020 census.

== History ==
Hamilton was founded by copper king Marcus Daly in the late 19th century. It was named for J.W. Hamilton, who provided the right-of-way to the railroad. Daly is said to have wanted to begin business in Grantsdale, but was denied the opportunity.

In the summer of 2000, forest fires throughout the Bitterroot Valley filled the area with smoke and prompted the evacuation of many residents. President Clinton declared a state of emergency in the area and dispatched National Guard troops to assist with fighting the fires.

== Geography ==
According to the United States Census Bureau, the city has a total area of 2.57 square miles (6.66 km^{2}), of which 2.53 square miles (6.55 km^{2}) is land and 0.04 square miles (0.10 km^{2}) is water.

=== Climate ===
According to the Köppen climate classification, Hamilton has a humid continental climate.

Climate data for Hamilton, Montana (1981–2010)
| Month | Jan | Feb | Mar | Apr | May | Jun | Jul | Aug | Sep | Oct | Nov | Dec | Year |
|---|---|---|---|---|---|---|---|---|---|---|---|---|---|
| Mean daily maximum °F (°C) | 36.7 (2.6) | 41.8 (5.4) | 51.4 (10.8) | 59.1 (15.1) | 67.6 (19.8) | 75.2 (24.0) | 85.1 (29.5) | 83.7 (28.7) | 72.8 (22.7) | 59.3 (15.2) | 44.2 (6.8) | 34.0 (1.1) | 59.2 (15.1) |
| Mean daily minimum °F (°C) | 18.8 (−7.3) | 20.7 (−6.3) | 26.9 (−2.8) | 32.7 (0.4) | 39.5 (4.2) | 45.6 (7.6) | 50.2 (10.1) | 48.6 (9.2) | 40.8 (4.9) | 31.8 (−0.1) | 24.3 (−4.3) | 16.8 (−8.4) | 33.1 (0.6) |
| Average precipitation inches (mm) | 0.88 (22) | 0.86 (22) | 0.97 (25) | 0.99 (25) | 1.67 (42) | 1.61 (41) | 0.99 (25) | 1.06 (27) | 1.01 (26) | 0.76 (19) | 1.19 (30) | 1.17 (30) | 13.17 (335) |
| Average snowfall inches (cm) | 3.0 (7.6) | 3.2 (8.1) | 1.5 (3.8) | 0.3 (0.76) | 0.2 (0.51) | 0.0 (0.0) | 0.0 (0.0) | 0.0 (0.0) | 0.0 (0.0) | 0.1 (0.25) | 2.3 (5.8) | 3.5 (8.9) | 14.3 (36) |
Source: NOAA

== Demographics ==
Historical population
| Census | Pop. | Note | %± |
|---|---|---|---|
| 1880 | 50 | | — |
| 1900 | 1,257 | | — |
| 1910 | 2,240 | | 78.2% |
| 1920 | 1,700 | | −24.1% |
| 1930 | 1,839 | | 8.2% |
| 1940 | 2,332 | | 26.8% |
| 1950 | 2,678 | | 14.8% |
| 1960 | 2,475 | | −7.6% |
| 1970 | 2,499 | | 1.0% |
| 1980 | 2,661 | | 6.5% |
| 1990 | 2,737 | | 2.9% |
| 2000 | 3,705 | | 35.4% |
| 2010 | 4,348 | | 17.4% |
| 2020 | 4,659 | | 7.2% |
U.S. Decennial Census

=== 2020 census ===
As of the 2020 census, Hamilton had a population of 4,659. The median age was 47.2 years. 17.9% of residents were under the age of 18 and 31.0% were 65 years of age or older. For every 100 females, there were 83.0 males, and for every 100 females age 18 and over, there were 78.2 males.

99.3% of residents lived in urban areas, while 0.7% lived in rural areas.

There were 2,279 households, of which 20.2% had children under the age of 18 living in them. Of all households, 29.8% were married-couple households, 22.0% were households with a male householder and no spouse or partner present, and 41.3% were households with a female householder and no spouse or partner present. About 48.3% of all households were made up of individuals, and 26.8% had someone living alone who was 65 years of age or older.

There were 2,451 housing units, of which 7.0% were vacant. The homeowner vacancy rate was 2.9% and the rental vacancy rate was 4.9%.

Racial composition as of the 2020 census
| Race | Number | Percent |
|---|---|---|
| White | 4,155 | 89.2% |
| Black or African American | 32 | 0.7% |
| American Indian and Alaska Native | 44 | 0.9% |
| Asian | 67 | 1.4% |
| Native Hawaiian and Other Pacific Islander | 7 | 0.2% |
| Some other race | 72 | 1.5% |
| Two or more races | 282 | 6.1% |
| Hispanic or Latino (of any race) | 212 | 4.6% |

=== 2010 census ===
As of the census of 2010, there were 4,348 people, 2,175 households, and 1,006 families living in the city. The population density was 1,718.6 inhabitants per square mile (663.6/km^{2}). There were 2,456 housing units at an average density of 970.8 per square mile (374.8/km^{2}). The racial makeup of the city was 95.0% White, 0.3% African American, 0.6% Native American, 1.4% Asian, 0.2% from other races, and 2.5% from two or more races. Hispanic or Latino of any race were 3.1% of the population.

There were 2,175 households, of which 23.6% had children under the age of 18 living with them, 30.6% were married couples living together, 11.7% had a female householder with no husband present, 3.9% had a male householder with no wife present, and 53.7% were non-families. 47.0% of all households were made up of individuals, and 22.8% had someone living alone who was 65 years of age or older. The average household size was 1.92 and the average family size was 2.72.

The median age in the city was 43 years. 20.1% of residents were under the age of 18; 7.4% were between the ages of 18 and 24; 24.4% were from 25 to 44; 23.4% were from 45 to 64; and 24.7% were 65 years of age or older. The gender makeup of the city was 46.6% male and 53.4% female.

=== 2000 census ===
As of the census of 2000, there were 3,705 people, 1,772 households, and 855 families living in the city. The population density was 1,603.6 inhabitants per square mile (619.2/km^{2}). There were 1,915 housing units at an average density of 828.8 per square mile (320.0/km^{2}). The racial makeup of the city was 96.22% White, 0.11% African American, 0.89% Native American, 0.78% Asian, 0.22% from other races, and 1.78% from two or more races. Hispanic or Latino of any race were 1.65% of the population.

There were 1,772 households, out of which 22.3% had children under the age of 18 living with them, 36.3% were married couples living together, 9.5% had a female householder with no husband present, and 51.7% were non-families. 47.6% of all households were made up of individuals, and 24.9% had someone living alone who was 65 years of age or older. The average household size was 1.95 and the average family size was 2.81.

In the city, the population was spread out, with 20.2% under the age of 18, 6.8% from 18 to 24, 24.0% from 25 to 44, 20.6% from 45 to 64, and 28.3% who were 65 years of age or older. The median age was 44 years. For every 100 females, there were 82.2 males. For every 100 females age 18 and over, there were 74.9 males.

The median income for a household in the city was $22,013, and the median income for a family was $30,665. Males had a median income of $25,795 versus $22,138 for females. The per capita income for the city was $14,689. About 14.3% of families and 17.8% of the population were below the poverty line, including 28.4% of those under age 18 and 15.3% of those age 65 or over.

== Economy ==
Hamilton has two microbiological research and production facilities: the government-run Rocky Mountain Laboratories, and a branch of GSK. NIAID (National Institute of Allergy and Infectious Diseases) completed construction of a Biosafety Level 4 biohazard laboratory as part of the Rocky Mountain Laboratories (RML) facility in 2008. This facility has begun operations using highly-pathogenic organisms including the Lentivirus family of viruses.

Hamilton had one of the last remaining Kmart stores in the United States, which was the only remaining one in the state of Montana and the entire Mountain time zone. Closure was announced in January 2022, with its final day of business conducted on March 6, 2022.

== Arts and culture ==
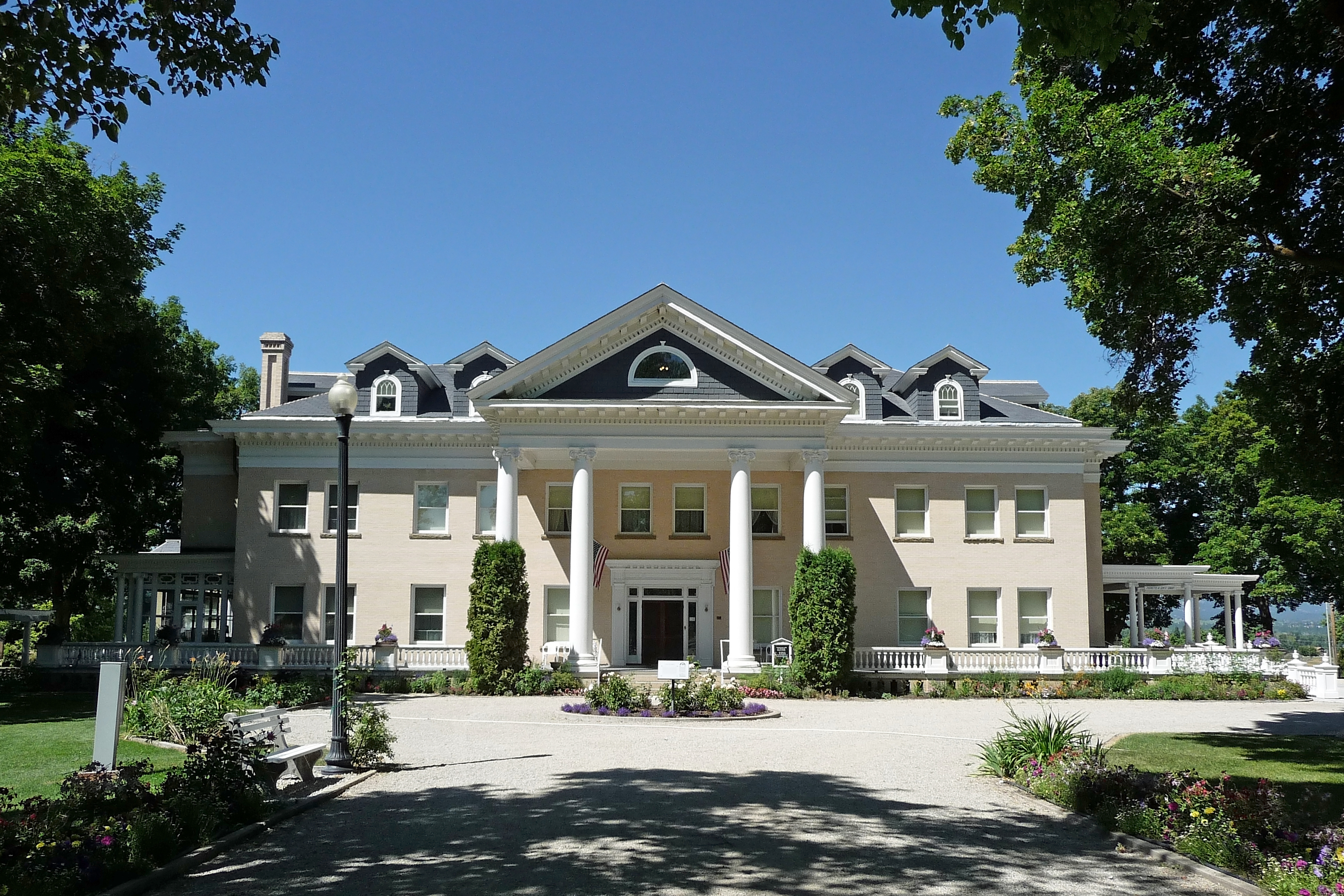
Daly Mansion

The Ravalli County Museum, founded in 1955, is located in the former Ravalli County Courthouse and focuses on county history, natural history and art. The Daly Mansion, home of Marcus Daly, offers tours. This mansion has over 50 rooms, 26 acres of lawns, and several outbuildings.

The 700-seat Hamilton Performing Arts Center at Hamilton High School is home for the annual Bitterroot Performing Arts Series, produced by the Bitterroot Performing Arts Council, as well as other school and public productions throughout the year.

The Bitterroot Public Library serves the town of Hamilton. It was one of the 17 Carnegie libraries built in Montana.

== Parks and recreation ==
Trails include River Park and Skalkaho Bend.

Circle 13 is a skateboard park at Claudia Driscoll Park. It is one of the skateparks built by Montana Pool Service, a project founded by Jeff Ament.

== Government ==
Hamilton's City Council has three Wards with two representatives from each Ward.

== Education ==
- Hamilton High School
- Bitterroot College.
- Tibetan Language Institute

== Media ==
Hamilton's newspaper is the Ravalli Republic. It is a daily broadsheet offered as print or e-edition as well as having online news.

Five radio stations are licensed in Hamilton: KBAZ with mainstream rock, KHKM with adult hits, KLYQ is news/talk, KMZO is a religious channel, and KUFN public radio.

== Infrastructure ==
Highways include US 93 and Montana Secondary Highway 269.

Ravalli County Airport is a public use airport near Hamilton.

Daly Hospital provides healthcare service in Hamilton.

== Notable people ==
- Willy Burgdorfer, scientist who discovered the cause of Lyme disease
- Herald Rea Cox, bacteriologist
- Marcus Daly, one of the "Copper Kings" of Butte, Montana, owned the Bitterroot Stock Farm near Hamilton
- Scott Lee Kimball, Colorado-born serial killer who lived in Hamilton during his teenage years.
- Henry L. Myers, United States Senator from Montana
- Jerry J. O'Connell, United States Representative from Montana, editor and publisher of local newspaper
- Val Skinner, golfer, winner of six LPGA Tour events
- Suzanna Son, film actress known for Red Rocket
- Michael D. Stevens, former Master Chief Petty Officer of the Navy
