= Lost Trail =

Lost Trail may refer to:

- Lost Trail National Wildlife Refuge, National Wildlife Refuge of the United States located in Montana
- Lost Trail Pass, mountain pass in the Bitterroot Mountains on the border of Idaho and Montana
- Lost Trail Powder Mountain, alpine ski area on the Montana-Idaho border
- Lost Trail Station, a historic stagecoach station in Colorado
- Lost Trail, a trail in the Windy Hill Open Space Preserve in California

== See also ==
- The Lost Trail
