= 2000–01 fires in the Western United States =

Series of wildfires in the United States

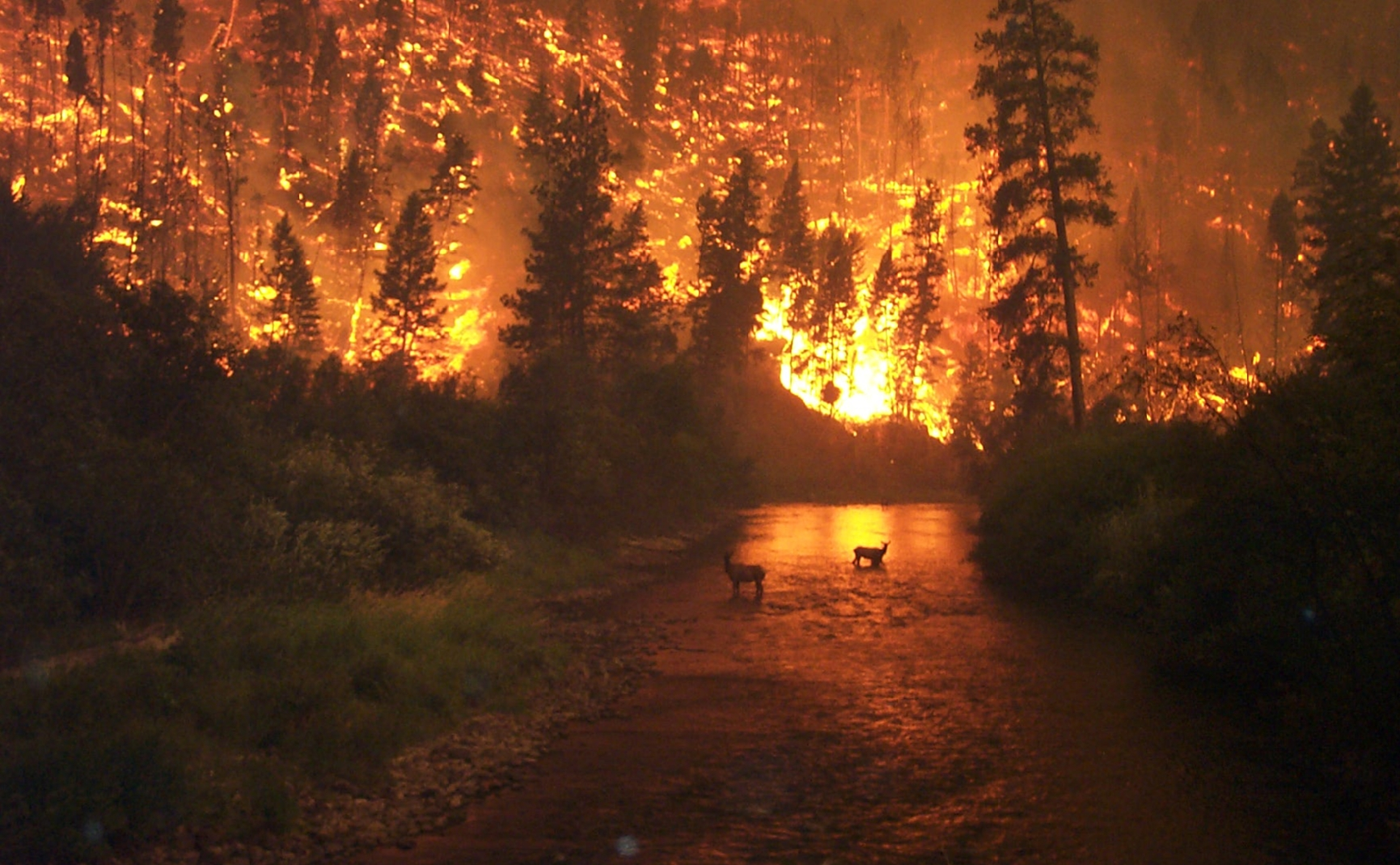
- Elk Bath, showing fire in Bitterroot National Forest

Statistics
- Total area: 6,966,995 acres (28,194.43 km^{2})

Impacts
- Deaths: 4 firefighters
- Cost: USD $2 billion

The 2000–2001 Western United States wildfires were a series of unusually severe wildfires that caused more than $2 billion (USD) in damage and resulted in the deaths of four firefighters. Overall, 6,966,995 acres burned across the United States and 2.2 million of those acres were in Idaho and Montana alone. A declaration of a state of emergency brought six military battalions and firefighting teams from as far away as Australia and New Zealand to the Western United States. Federal and state land management organizations recognize the fires as historic "both in extent and duration". The ten year fire season average is 3.1 million acres; the fires in 2000 destroyed more than double that acreage. Nearly $900 million (USD) was spent fighting fires. Long-lasting ecological damage, including flooding, top soil runoff, and air quality damage continues to this day.

The damage was particularly severe in the Bitterroot National Forest. One of the most stunning photos from these fires are two elk seeking shelter in the East Fork of the Bitterroot River. The photo became known as Elk Bath.
