= Darby, Montana =

- Town
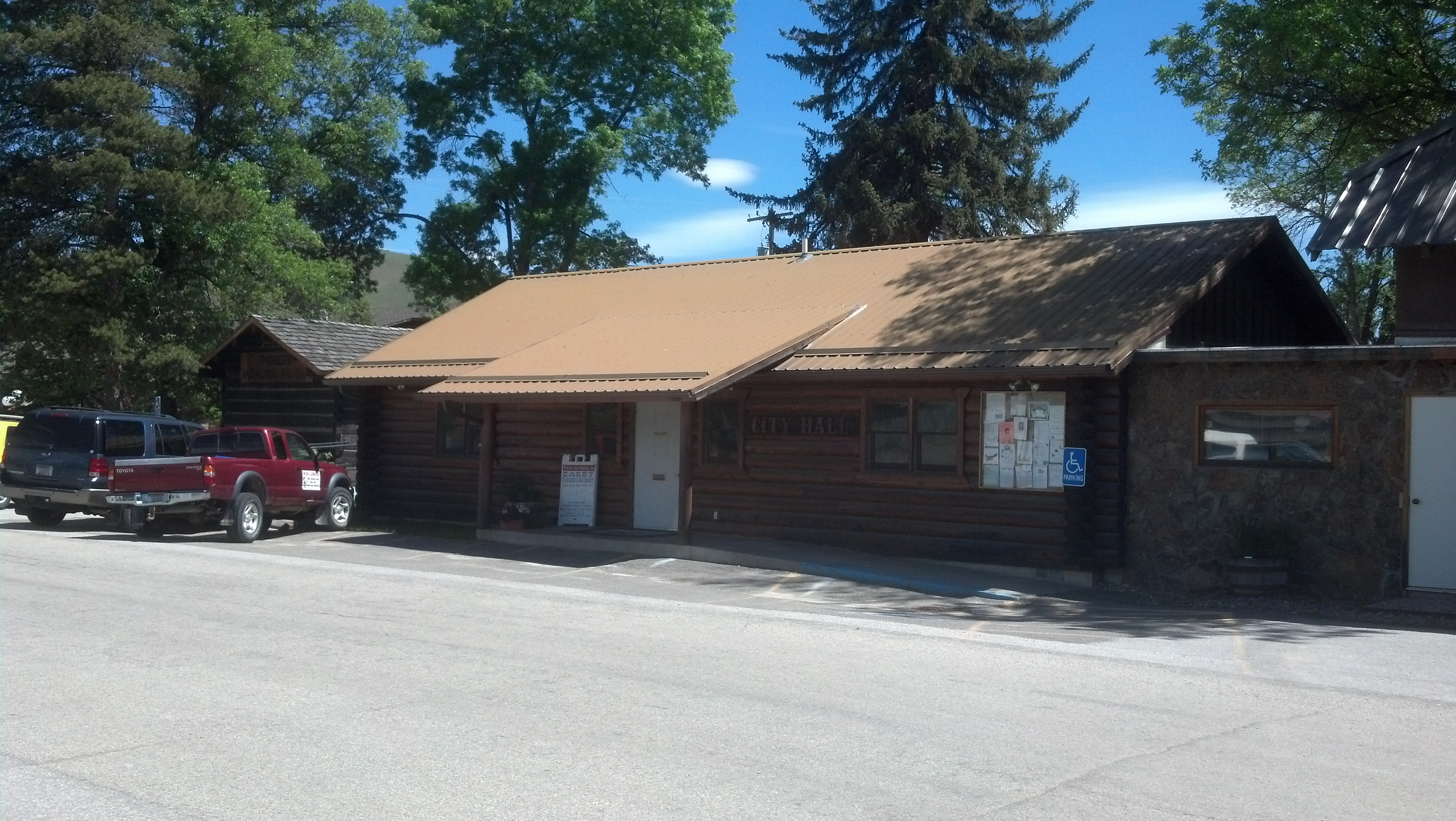
- Town hall

- Location of Darby, Montana
- Coordinates: 46°01′24″N 114°10′44″W
- Country: United States
- State: Montana
- County: Ravalli

Government
  - Mayor: Nancy McKinney

Area
  - Total: 0.65 sq mi (1.69 km^{2})
  - Land: 0.63 sq mi (1.64 km^{2})
  - Water: 0.019 sq mi (0.05 km^{2})
- Elevation: 3,891 ft (1,186 m)

Population (2020)
  - Total: 783
  - Density: 1,238.8/sq mi (478.32/km^{2})
- Time zone: UTC-7 (Mountain (MST))
  - Summer (DST): UTC-6 (MDT)
- ZIP code: 59829
- Area code: 406
- FIPS code: 30-19300
- GNIS feature ID: 2412404
- Website: www.darbymt.net

Darby is a town in Ravalli County, Montana, United States. The population was 783 at the 2020 census. Darby is located near the southwestern border of Montana and Idaho, along the Continental Divide.

Officially established in 1889, the town was named after James W. Darby who signed the post office application.

== Geography ==
According to the United States Census Bureau, the town has a total area of 0.58 square miles (1.50 km^{2}), all land.

Darby is located at the southern end of the Bitterroot Valley. The valley is formed between the Bitterroot Range on the west and the smaller Sapphire Mountains on the east.

=== Climate ===
This climatic region is typified by large seasonal temperature differences, with warm to hot (and often humid) summers and cold (sometimes severely cold) winters. According to the Köppen Climate Classification system, Darby has a humid continental climate, abbreviated "Dfb" on climate maps.

Visitors to Darby may wish to seek shelter during thunderstorms. In July 2012, "A cowboy and two spectators were taken by ambulance to a Hamilton hospital [...] after lightning hit a power pole at the Elite Bull Connection, sending an electric shock through the grandstands, rodeo chutes and bull pens." On July 14, 2014, 45 cattle on a ranch near Darby were killed in a single lightning strike.

Climate data for Darby, Montana (1991–2020 normals, extremes 1898–1899, 1914, 1926–present)
Month	Jan	Feb	Mar	Apr	May	Jun	Jul	Aug	Sep	Oct	Nov	Dec	Year
Record high °F (°C)	69 (21)	70 (21)	78 (26)	85 (29)	95 (35)	100 (38)	105 (41)	103 (39)	98 (37)	91 (33)	74 (23)	67 (19)	105 (41)
Mean daily maximum °F (°C)	33.9 (1.1)	38.1 (3.4)	47.2 (8.4)	53.7 (12.1)	64.0 (17.8)	71.6 (22.0)	81.8 (27.7)	80.6 (27.0)	71.4 (21.9)	57.0 (13.9)	41.6 (5.3)	32.2 (0.1)	56.1 (13.4)
Daily mean °F (°C)	26.5 (−3.1)	29.5 (−1.4)	37.1 (2.8)	42.5 (5.8)	51.5 (10.8)	58.0 (14.4)	65.7 (18.7)	64.1 (17.8)	56.4 (13.6)	44.8 (7.1)	33.2 (0.7)	25.7 (−3.5)	44.6 (7.0)
Mean daily minimum °F (°C)	19.2 (−7.1)	21.0 (−6.1)	27.1 (−2.7)	31.3 (−0.4)	39.0 (3.9)	44.5 (6.9)	49.6 (9.8)	47.6 (8.7)	41.5 (5.3)	32.6 (0.3)	24.8 (−4.0)	19.2 (−7.1)	33.1 (0.6)
Record low °F (°C)	−36 (−38)	−35 (−37)	−15 (−26)	2 (−17)	17 (−8)	25 (−4)	31 (−1)	25 (−4)	14 (−10)	−5 (−21)	−25 (−32)	−34 (−37)	−36 (−38)
Average precipitation inches (mm)	1.08 (27)	0.87 (22)	0.85 (22)	1.04 (26)	1.60 (41)	2.09 (53)	1.14 (29)	0.90 (23)	1.23 (31)	1.50 (38)	1.55 (39)	1.26 (32)	15.11 (384)
Average precipitation days (≥ 0.01 in)	8.4	5.6	6.4	6.9	9.2	9.6	5.6	5.6	6.1	8.3	7.9	7.7	87.3
Source: NOAA

== Demographics ==
Historical population
Census	Pop.	Note	%±
1920	325		—
1930	285		−12.3%
1940	481		68.8%
1950	415		−13.7%
1960	398		−4.1%
1970	538		35.2%
1980	581		8.0%
1990	625		7.6%
2000	710		13.6%
2010	720		1.4%
2020	783		8.8%
U.S. Decennial Census

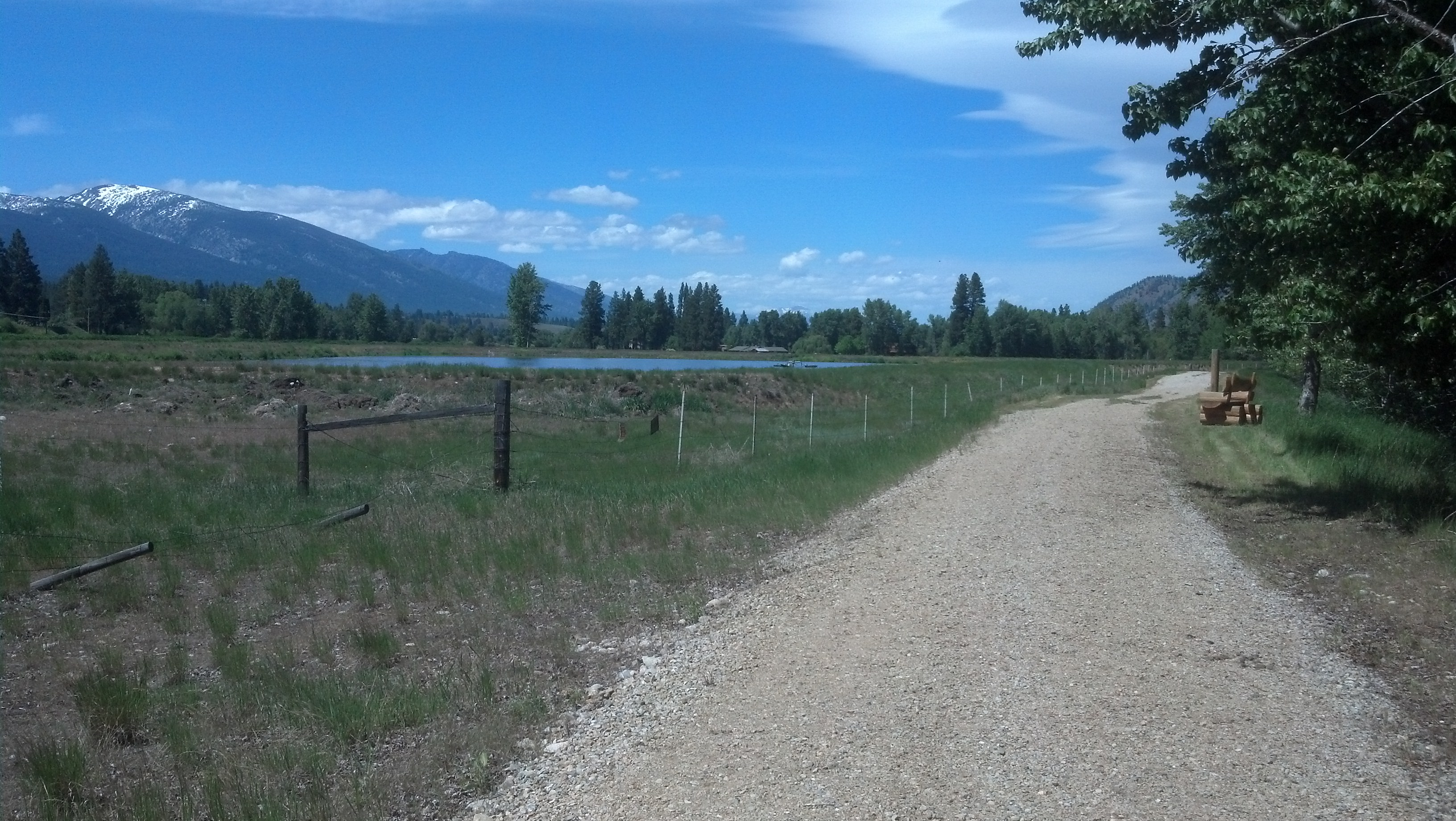
Discovery nature trail

=== 2010 census ===
As of the census of 2010, there were 720 people, 303 households, and 179 families residing in the town. The population density was 1,241.4 inhabitants per square mile (479.3/km^{2}). There were 360 housing units at an average density of 620.7 per square mile (239.7/km^{2}). The racial makeup of the town was 91.3% White, 0.1% African American, 4.2% Native American, 0.8% Asian, and 3.6% from two or more races. Hispanic or Latino of any race were 2.2% of the population.

There were 303 households, of which 28.1% had children under the age of 18 living with them, 39.6% were married couples living together, 14.5% had a female householder with no husband present, 5.0% had a male householder with no wife present, and 40.9% were non-families. 33.3% of all households were made up of individuals, and 12.9% had someone living alone who was 65 years of age or older. The average household size was 2.36 and the average family size was 2.94.

The median age in the town was 40.8 years. 24% of residents were under the age of 18; 8.2% were between the ages of 18 and 24; 23.1% were from 25 to 44; 29.6% were from 45 to 64; and 15% were 65 years of age or older. The gender makeup of the town was 49.9% male and 50.1% female.

=== 2000 census ===
As of the census of 2000, there were 710 people, 279 households, and 176 families residing in the town. The population density was 1,336.5 inhabitants per square mile (516.0/km^{2}). There were 316 housing units at an average density of 230.2/km^{2} or 594.8/sq mi. The racial makeup of the town was 90.56% White, 0.14% African American, 3.24% Native American, 2.39% from other races, and 3.66% from two or more races. Hispanic or Latino of any race were 3.52% of the population.

There were 279 households, out of which 36.9% had children under the age of 18 living with them, 41.9% were married couples living together, 14.0% had a female householder with no husband present, and 36.9% were non-families. 30.5% of all households were made up of individuals, and 10.8% had someone living alone who was 65 years of age or older. The average household size was 2.54 and the average family size was 3.20.

In the town, the population was spread out, with 32.3% under the age of 18, 9.0% from 18 to 24, 26.9% from 25 to 44, 22.5% from 45 to 64, and 9.3% who were 65 years of age or older. The median age was 33 years. For every 100 females there were 99.4 males. For every 100 females age 18 and over, there were 91.6 males.

The median income for a household in the town was $25,221, and the median income for a family was $27,500. Males had a median income of $21,071 versus $20,781 for females. The per capita income for the town was $11,658. About 19.5% of families and 24.0% of the population were below the poverty line, including 30.6% of those under age 18 and 9.3% of those age 65 or over.

== Arts and culture ==
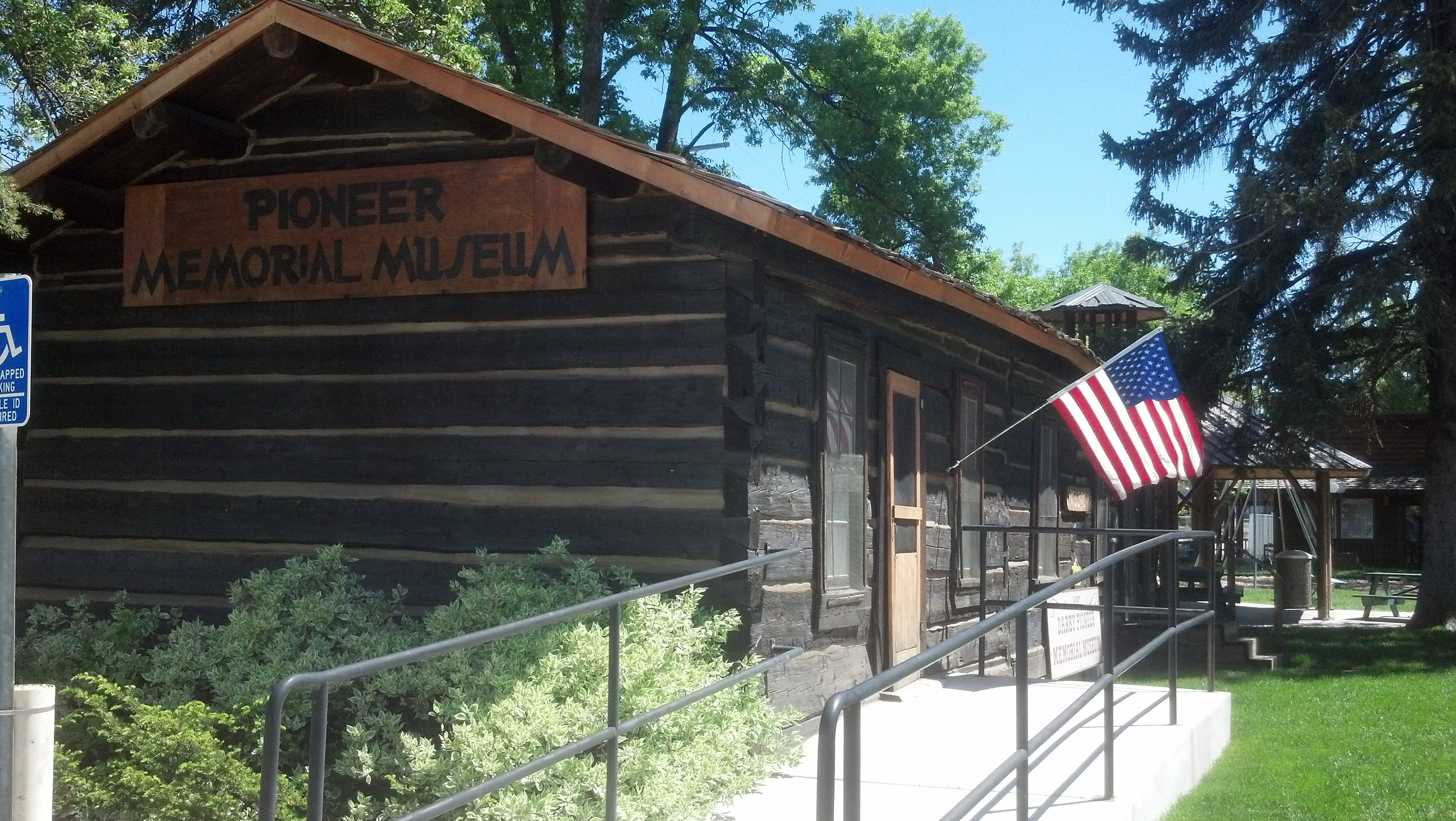
Pioneer Memorial Museum

The Darby Pioneer Memorial Museum has an extensive collection of pioneer artifacts. The Darby Ranger Station Museum showcases information about the station and the people who worked there. In addition it serves as a Visitor Center.

The town has an assortment of annual events. In January the Bitterroot Mushers hold the Darby Dog Derby. The event has multiple dog sled races with a variety of distances. During summer the town enjoys Last Fridays at the Main Street Park, which has live music, art, and vendors. In July, the community celebrates with the Strawberry Festival, a fundraiser for the fire department. Strawberry shortcake is served and live bluegrass music is shared in the afternoon. There is also the Hardtimes Bluegrass Festival held north of town. In 2023 thirteen bands performed.

The Darby Rodeo Association sponsors several rodeos during the year. The Yellowstone Darby Xtreme Bareback Event is a PRCA sanctioned event. The Twisted Nut festival in July is used as a fundraiser for testicular cancer.

Darby Community Public Library serves the town.

== Parks and recreation ==
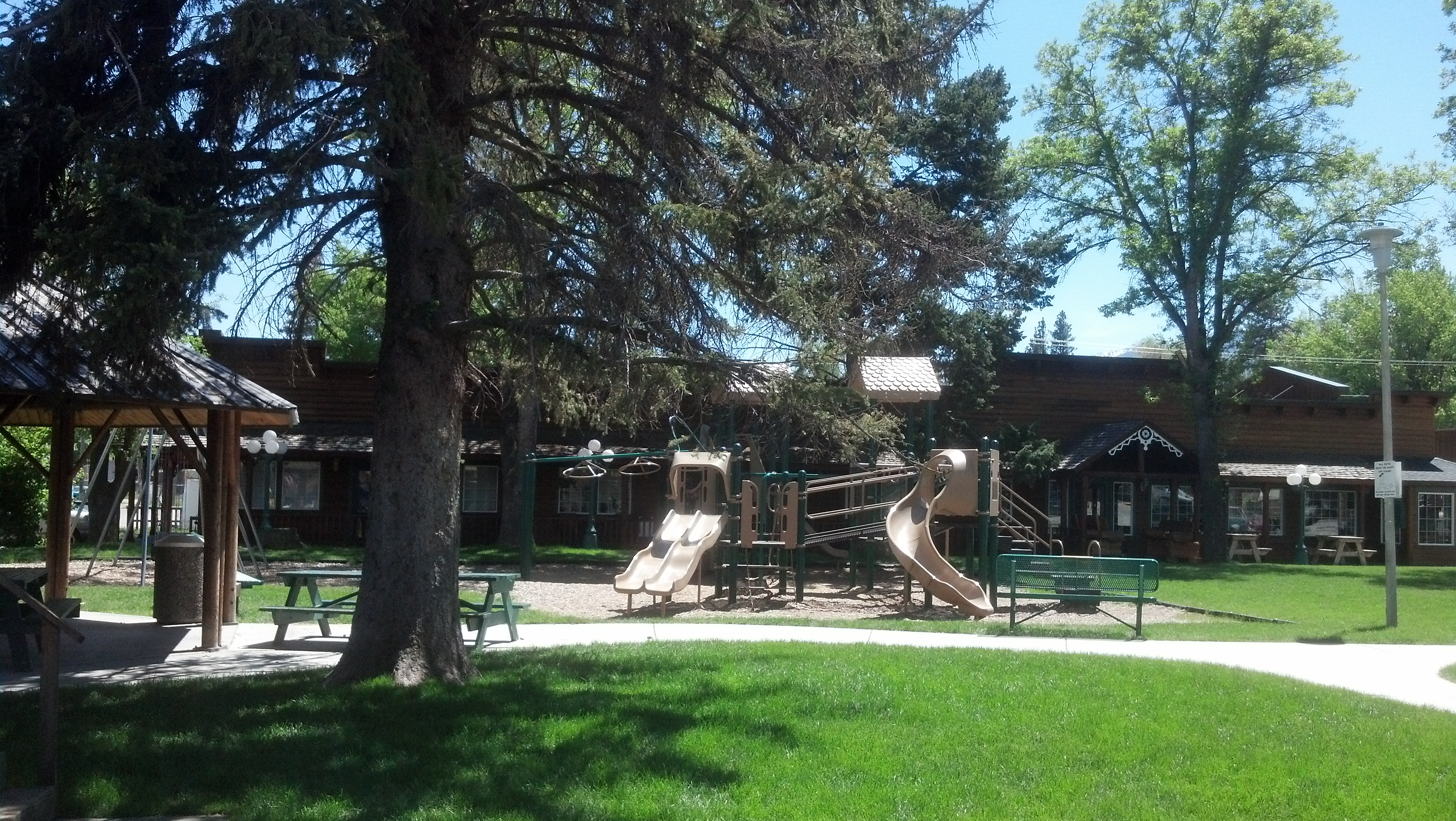
Main street park

The town has five city parks, plus a skatepark and trail system. The Darby Skatepark was built by Evergreen Skateparks, an award-winning international company. Several hiking trails have trailheads near Darby.

The Bitterroot River directly next to town is particularly known for fly fishing. The town is near both the West Fork and East Fork parts of the river, offering variety in fishing options. At only 7 miles (11 km) away, Lake Como offers fishing, kayaking, and hiking. The picturesque lake is in the Bitterroot National Forest. Nearby Painted Rocks State Park has a reservoir with boating and camping available.

South of Darby is Lost Trail Powder Mountain which is used for both downhill skiing and snowboarding.

== Government ==
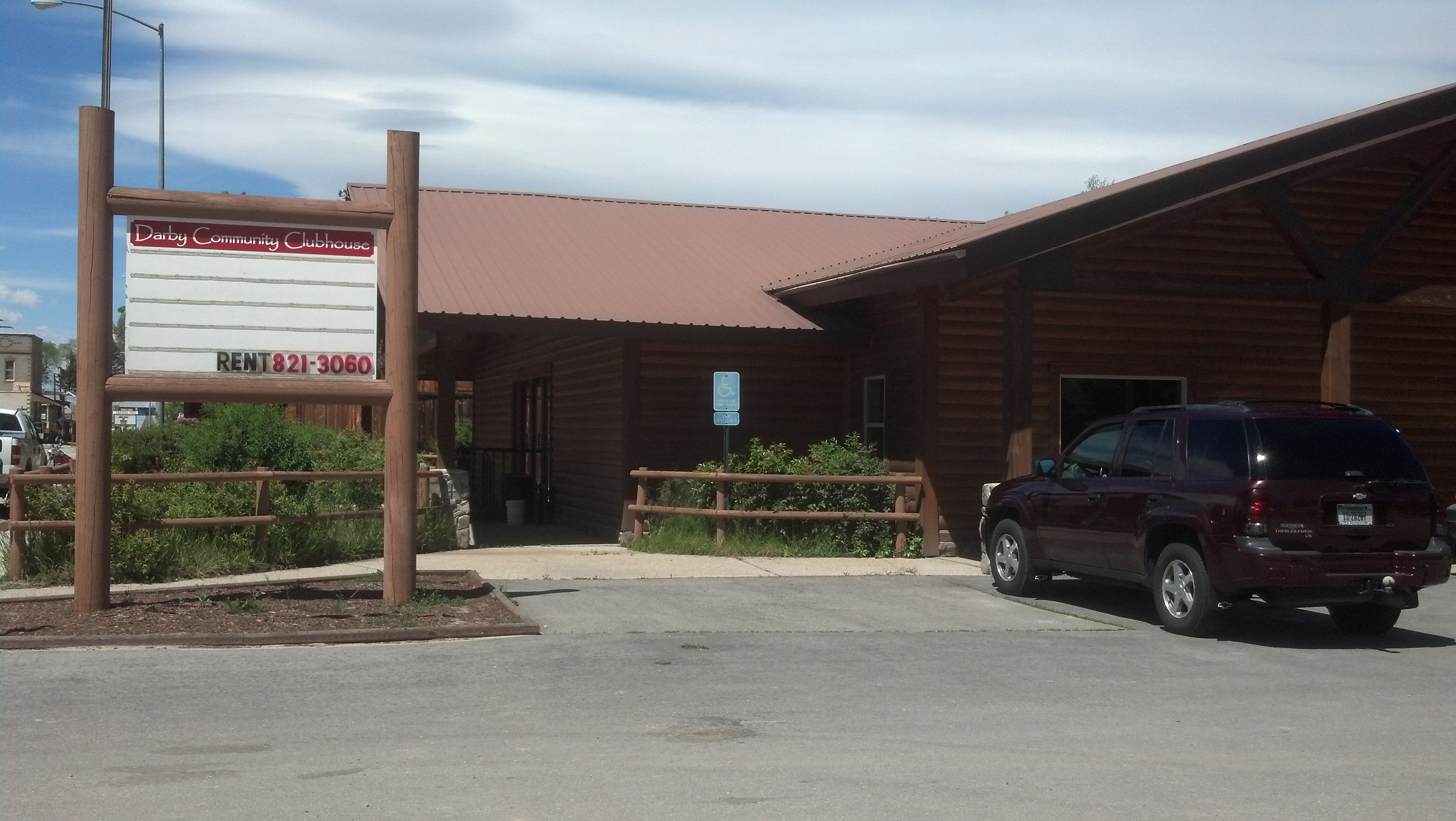
Community clubhouse

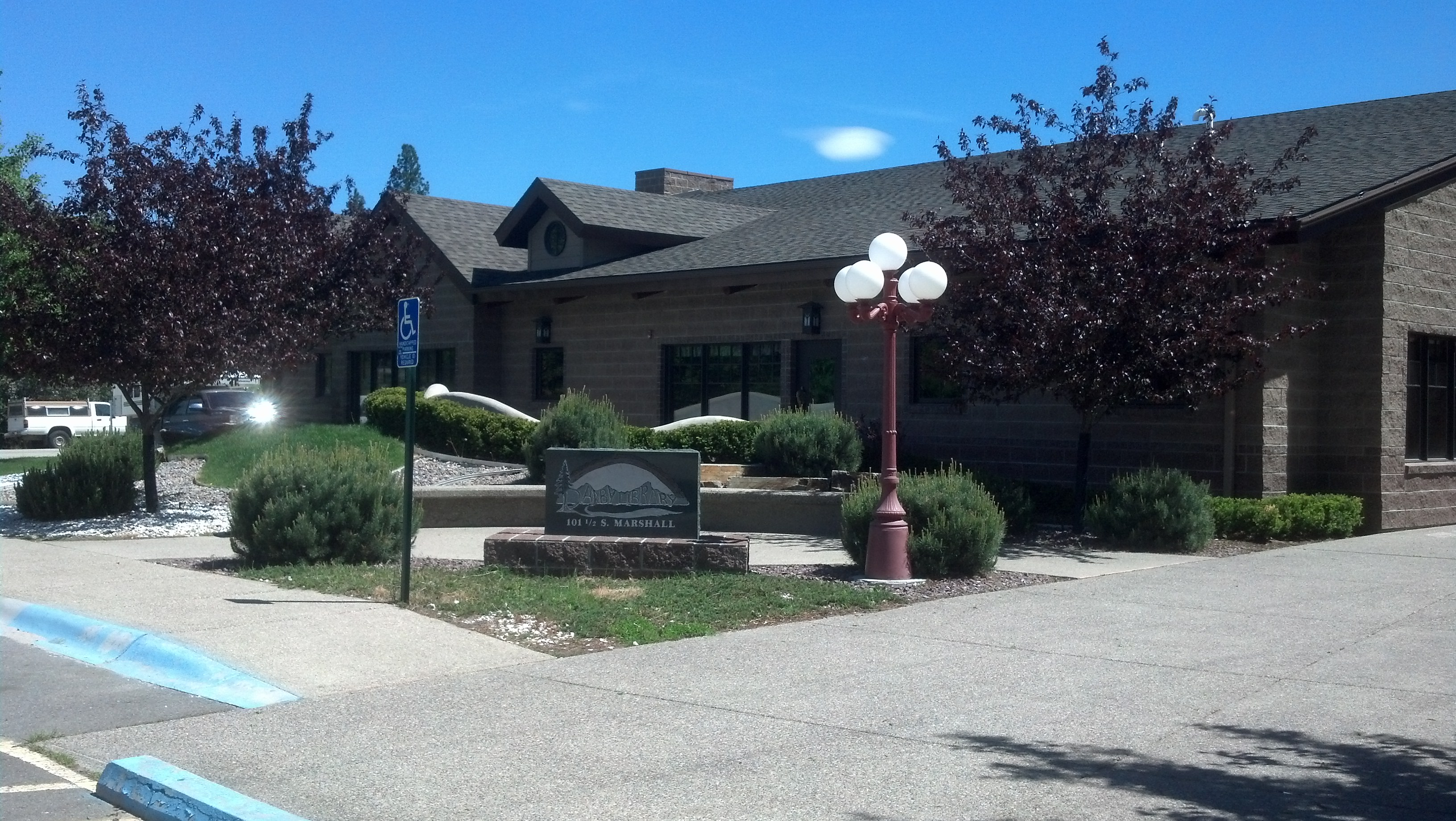
Library

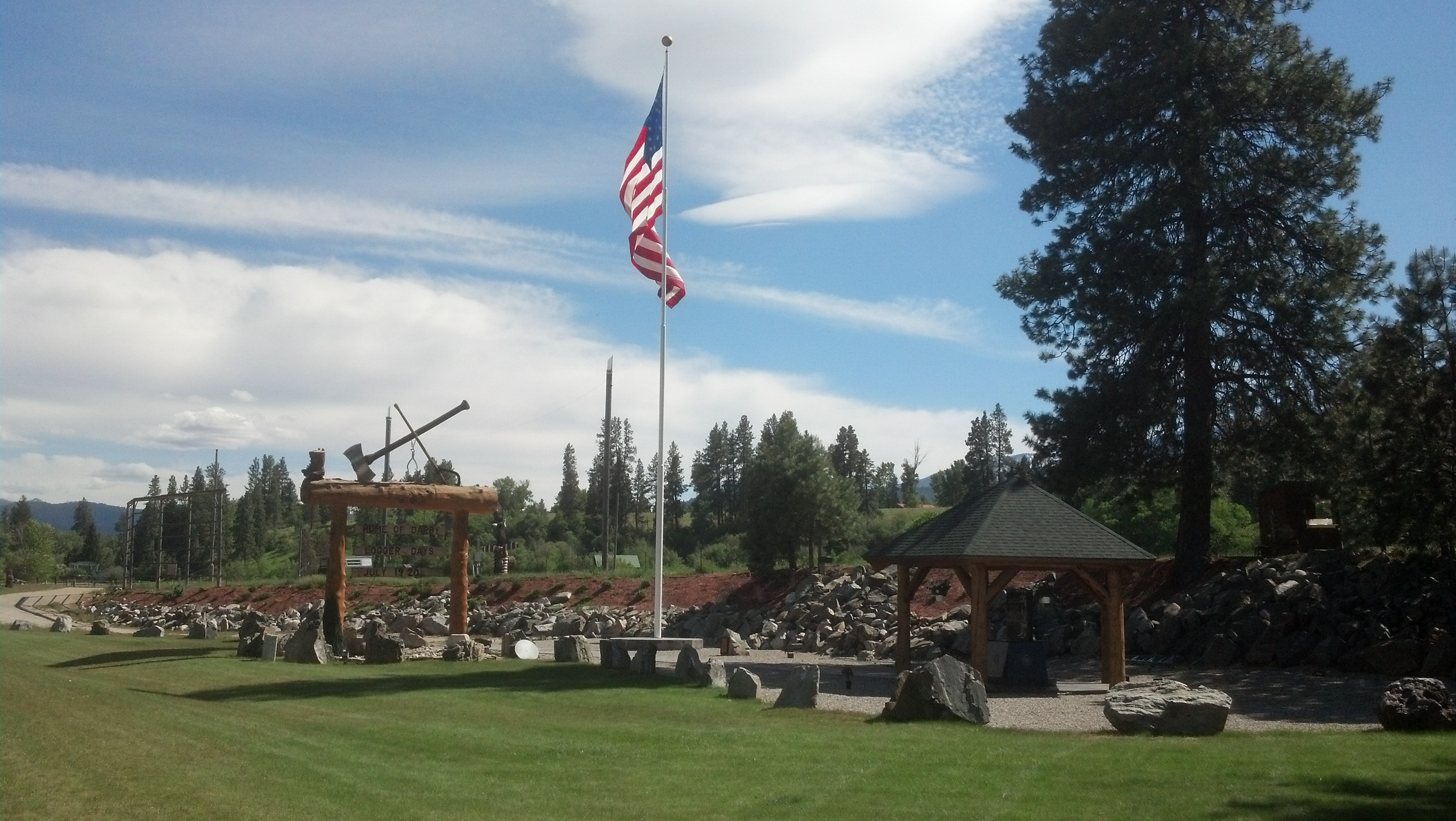
Veterans' memorial

Darby has a mayor-council form of government. The Darby Town Council has two wards and an at-large position. In 2023, the Mayor was Nancy McKinney.

== Education ==
Darby K-12 Schools is the area school district. Darby School District educates students from kindergarten through 12th grade. There are three schools in the district, elementary, middle for grades 7 and 8, and high school. In 2022, there were 349 students. Darby High School's team name is the Tigers.

== Media ==
The Ravalli Republic newspaper is published in nearby Hamilton and covers Darby news.

The FM radio station KHDV is licensed in Darby. It airs a classic hits music format.

=== Television filmed in Darby ===
Yellowstone is an American television series created by Taylor Sheridan that premiered on June 20, 2018, on the Paramount Network. The series went into production in August 2017 at the Chief Joseph Ranch, which stands in as the home of character John Dutton.

== Infrastructure ==
US Route 93 passes through town from north to south.

The nearest commercial airport is Missoula Montana Airport, 63 miles (101 km) north.

In 2023, Bitterroot Health began construction on a clinic in Darby. Other healthcare facilities are in Hamilton or Missoula.

== See also ==
- Nez Perce National Forest
- Selway-Bitterroot Wilderness
