= Ross' Hole =

Valley in Montana, United States

Coordinates: 45.845°N 113.958°W

Ross' Hole (Salish: K͏ʷtíɫ P̓upƛ̓m̓ ("big open or big clear area"), also Sk͏ʷtíɫ X̣súlex͏ʷ) is a valley located in Ravalli County, in Sula State Forest, along U.S. Route 93 in the vicinity of the hamlet of Sula, Montana.

It was named after fur trader Alexander Ross, leader of a Hudson's Bay Company trapping brigade, who camped there in 1824. According to the Encyclopedia of the Lewis and Clark Expedition, "Hole" was a term used by trappers for a broad, flat valley surrounded by mountains.

It is known as the subject of a famous painting, "Lewis and Clark Meeting the Flathead Indians at Ross' Hole," which hangs in the Montana House of Representatives Chamber.

== Description ==
The shape of the hill- and mountain-enclosed valley resembles a Christmas tree, with the base at the south, where the valley is about 4 miles wide. It extends northward about 8 miles, gradually tapering to a point. Except for the small community of Sula, a few ranch-houses, and highway U.S. 93, which skirts the southwestern corner of the hole, where the Lewis and Clark Expedition met the Flatheads, the landscape appears much as it did in Lewis and Clark's day. Various unimproved roads provide access to the northern part of the valley.

== Visits by Lewis and Clark ==
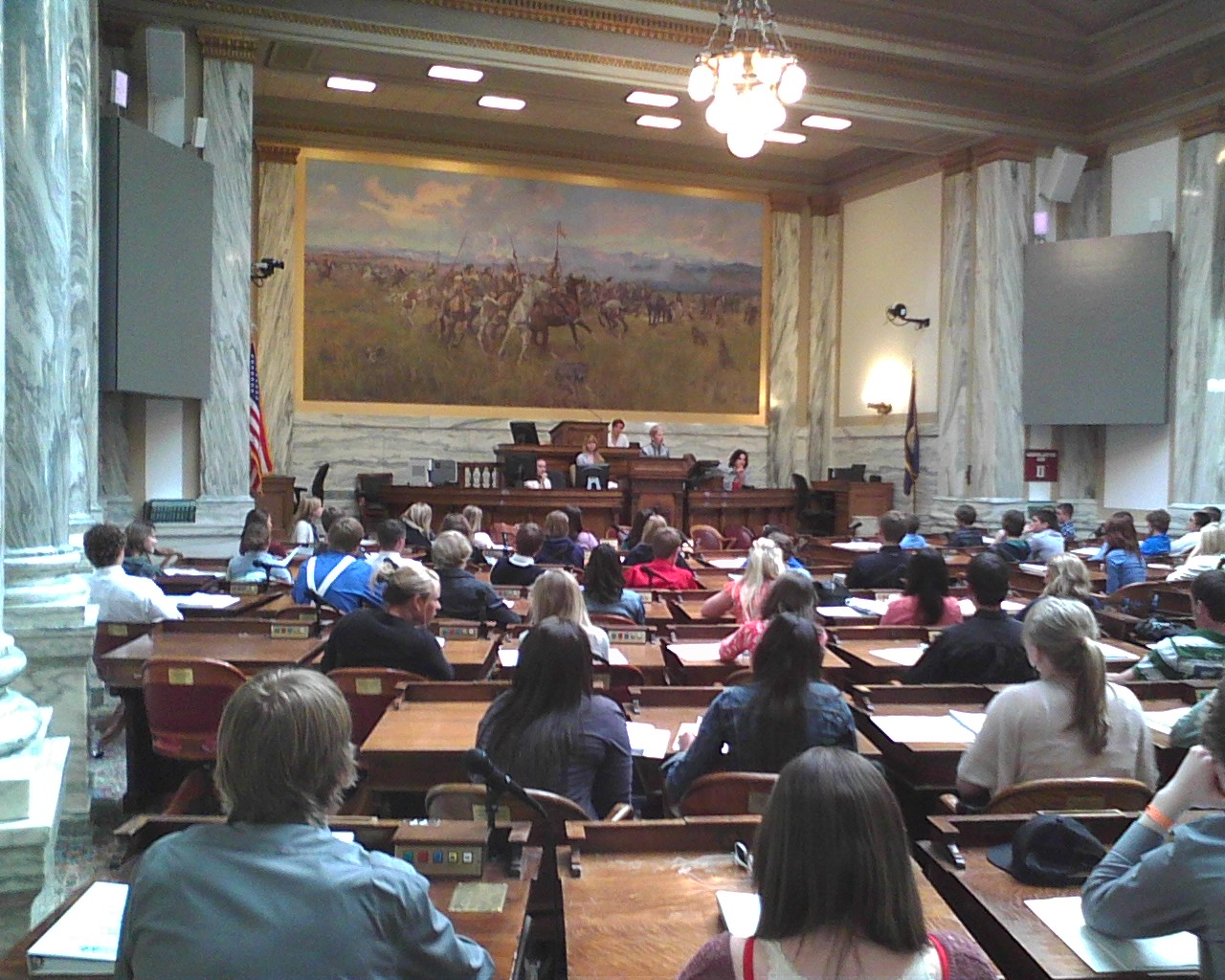
"Lewis and Clark Meeting the Flathead Indians at Ross' Hole," Montana House of Representatives Chamber

In the southwestern corner of Ross' Hole at the junction of Camp Creek and the east fork of the Bitterroot River, en route from the Lemhi Valley to the Lolo Trail, on September 4, 1805, the westbound Lewis and Clark expedition encountered a village of Flathead Indians and spent 2 days with them. From the friendly tribe, the explorers obtained badly needed horses. The State of Montana commissioned a painting of the event by Charles M. Russell in 1912. The huge 12 by 26 foot painting hangs behind the Speaker's desk in the Montana State Capitol.

On the return trek from the Pacific, the Clark contingent stopped at the hole on the night of July 5–6, 1806.
