= Sula, Montana =

- Census-designated place
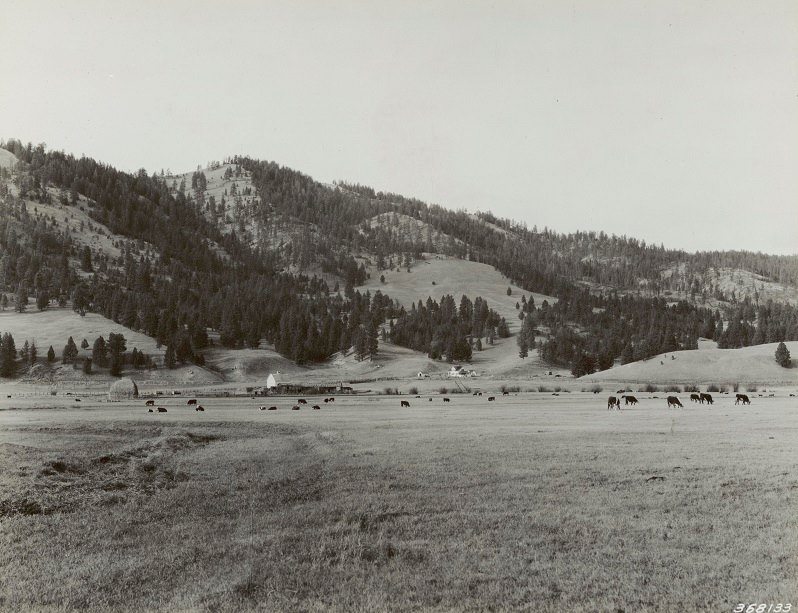
- French basin near Sula, 1939

- Location within Montana
- Coordinates: 45°50′43″N 113°57′36″W
- Country: United States
- State: Montana
- County: Ravalli

Area
  - Total: 3.31 sq mi (8.57 km^{2})
  - Land: 3.27 sq mi (8.47 km^{2})
  - Water: 0.035 sq mi (0.09 km^{2})
- Elevation: 4,469 ft (1,362 m)

Population (2020)
  - Total: 41
  - Density: 12.5/sq mi (4.84/km^{2})
- Time zone: UTC-7 (Mountain (MST))
  - Summer (DST): UTC-6 (MDT)
- ZIP code: 59871
- Area code: 406
- FIPS code: 30-71800
- GNIS feature ID: 2583854

Sula is a census-designated place (CDP) in Ravalli County, Montana, United States. It is named after the community of Sula, which it encompasses, and was established about 2010, prior to that year's census. As of the 2020 census, Sula had a population of 41.

== History ==
The area was originally called Ross's Hole from Alexander Ross, a Hudson's Bay Company fur trader who had traveled through the area in spring 1824. In 1889, settlers named the post office after Ursula (Sula for short) Thompson, purportedly the first non-Indian child born in Ross's Hole.

== Geography ==
Sula is located along U.S. Route 93 in southern Ravalli County. It lies along the East Fork of the Bitterroot River at the west end of Ross' Hole, a wide valley surrounded by mountains. It is 35 miles (56 km) north along U.S. 93 to Hamilton, the county seat, and 58 miles (93 km) south over Lost Trail Pass to Salmon, Idaho.

According to the United States Census Bureau, the CDP has a total area of 3.3 square miles (8.6 km^{2}), of which 3.3 square miles (8.5 km^{2}) is land and 0.039 square miles (0.1 km^{2}), or 1.09%, is water.

=== Climate ===
This climatic region is typified by large seasonal temperature differences, with warm to hot (and often humid) summers and cold (sometimes severely cold) winters. According to the Köppen Climate Classification system, Sula has a humid continental climate, abbreviated "Dfb" on climate maps.

Climate data for Sula 14 NE, Montana 1991–2020 normals: 5155ft (1571m)
Month	Jan	Feb	Mar	Apr	May	Jun	Jul	Aug	Sep	Oct	Nov	Dec	Year
Record high °F (°C)	51 (11)	56 (13)	70 (21)	79 (26)	90 (32)	97 (36)	101 (38)	97 (36)	96 (36)	87 (31)	67 (19)	54 (12)	101 (38)
Mean maximum °F (°C)	45.4 (7.4)	49.7 (9.8)	59.5 (15.3)	70.6 (21.4)	80.9 (27.2)	88.1 (31.2)	94.0 (34.4)	92.5 (33.6)	88.6 (31.4)	75.1 (23.9)	58.2 (14.6)	41.9 (5.5)	95.0 (35.0)
Mean daily maximum °F (°C)	31.5 (−0.3)	35.5 (1.9)	43.1 (6.2)	50.4 (10.2)	61.3 (16.3)	70.0 (21.1)	81.3 (27.4)	80.7 (27.1)	69.7 (20.9)	54.2 (12.3)	37.8 (3.2)	28.8 (−1.8)	53.7 (12.0)
Daily mean °F (°C)	20.8 (−6.2)	23.7 (−4.6)	31.3 (−0.4)	37.7 (3.2)	46.4 (8.0)	53.3 (11.8)	60.7 (15.9)	59.5 (15.3)	50.9 (10.5)	40.1 (4.5)	27.9 (−2.3)	19.4 (−7.0)	39.3 (4.1)
Mean daily minimum °F (°C)	10.1 (−12.2)	11.9 (−11.2)	19.5 (−6.9)	25.0 (−3.9)	31.6 (−0.2)	36.7 (2.6)	40.1 (4.5)	38.4 (3.6)	32.2 (0.1)	26.0 (−3.3)	17.9 (−7.8)	9.9 (−12.3)	24.9 (−3.9)
Mean minimum °F (°C)	−18.7 (−28.2)	−15.8 (−26.6)	−3.9 (−19.9)	9.7 (−12.4)	17.9 (−7.8)	24.8 (−4.0)	30.4 (−0.9)	28.3 (−2.1)	21.0 (−6.1)	6.6 (−14.1)	−5.5 (−20.8)	−17.0 (−27.2)	−24.7 (−31.5)
Record low °F (°C)	−35 (−37)	−39 (−39)	−24 (−31)	−2 (−19)	12 (−11)	21 (−6)	26 (−3)	22 (−6)	16 (−9)	−15 (−26)	−21 (−29)	−28 (−33)	−39 (−39)
Average precipitation inches (mm)	1.52 (39)	1.38 (35)	1.73 (44)	1.72 (44)	2.57 (65)	2.87 (73)	1.27 (32)	1.08 (27)	1.62 (41)	1.48 (38)	1.77 (45)	1.81 (46)	20.82 (529)
Average snowfall inches (cm)	15.80 (40.1)	17.00 (43.2)	14.30 (36.3)	6.30 (16.0)	2.00 (5.1)	0.90 (2.3)	0.00 (0.00)	0.00 (0.00)	0.40 (1.0)	2.40 (6.1)	10.30 (26.2)	19.00 (48.3)	88.4 (224.6)
Source 1: NOAA
Source 2: XMACIS2 (records & monthly max/mins)

Climate data for Sula 3 ENE, Montana, 1991–2020 normals, 1955-2020 extremes: 4475ft (1364m)
Month	Jan	Feb	Mar	Apr	May	Jun	Jul	Aug	Sep	Oct	Nov	Dec	Year
Record high °F (°C)	58 (14)	67 (19)	74 (23)	83 (28)	90 (32)	95 (35)	98 (37)	100 (38)	92 (33)	89 (32)	72 (22)	59 (15)	100 (38)
Mean maximum °F (°C)	49.5 (9.7)	54.3 (12.4)	64.9 (18.3)	72.1 (22.3)	80.5 (26.9)	87.0 (30.6)	93.0 (33.9)	92.2 (33.4)	87.1 (30.6)	78.8 (26.0)	61.0 (16.1)	48.2 (9.0)	92.3 (33.5)
Mean daily maximum °F (°C)	34.3 (1.3)	39.2 (4.0)	48.2 (9.0)	55.0 (12.8)	63.9 (17.7)	71.9 (22.2)	82.2 (27.9)	81.3 (27.4)	73.2 (22.9)	58.2 (14.6)	42.8 (6.0)	32.7 (0.4)	56.9 (13.9)
Daily mean °F (°C)	23.6 (−4.7)	26.8 (−2.9)	35.0 (1.7)	41.0 (5.0)	48.6 (9.2)	55.7 (13.2)	62.5 (16.9)	60.8 (16.0)	53.5 (11.9)	42.5 (5.8)	31.4 (−0.3)	22.2 (−5.4)	42.0 (5.5)
Mean daily minimum °F (°C)	12.9 (−10.6)	14.3 (−9.8)	21.9 (−5.6)	27.1 (−2.7)	33.3 (0.7)	39.6 (4.2)	42.7 (5.9)	40.3 (4.6)	33.8 (1.0)	26.8 (−2.9)	20.0 (−6.7)	11.8 (−11.2)	27.0 (−2.8)
Mean minimum °F (°C)	−13.0 (−25.0)	−9.7 (−23.2)	3.8 (−15.7)	15.4 (−9.2)	20.0 (−6.7)	28.5 (−1.9)	32.9 (0.5)	29.4 (−1.4)	20.8 (−6.2)	10.9 (−11.7)	−2.9 (−19.4)	−11.0 (−23.9)	−21.2 (−29.6)
Record low °F (°C)	−43 (−42)	−46 (−43)	−24 (−31)	3 (−16)	10 (−12)	20 (−7)	21 (−6)	14 (−10)	10 (−12)	−10 (−23)	−30 (−34)	−45 (−43)	−46 (−43)
Average precipitation inches (mm)	0.72 (18)	0.83 (21)	1.04 (26)	1.76 (45)	2.06 (52)	2.73 (69)	1.19 (30)	1.07 (27)	1.25 (32)	1.30 (33)	1.28 (33)	0.99 (25)	16.22 (411)
Average snowfall inches (cm)	5.9 (15)	3.2 (8.1)	4.6 (12)	1.4 (3.6)	0.5 (1.3)	0.0 (0.0)	0.0 (0.0)	0.0 (0.0)	0.4 (1.0)	0.5 (1.3)	4.2 (11)	6.1 (15)	26.8 (68.3)
Source 1: NOAA (Alder 17 S snowfall)
Source 2: XMACIS2 (records & monthly max/mins)

== Demographics ==
Historical population
Census	Pop.	Note	%±
2020	41		—
U.S. Decennial Census

== Education ==
Darby K-12 Schools is the area school district.
