= Elk Bath =

Photograph by John McColgan

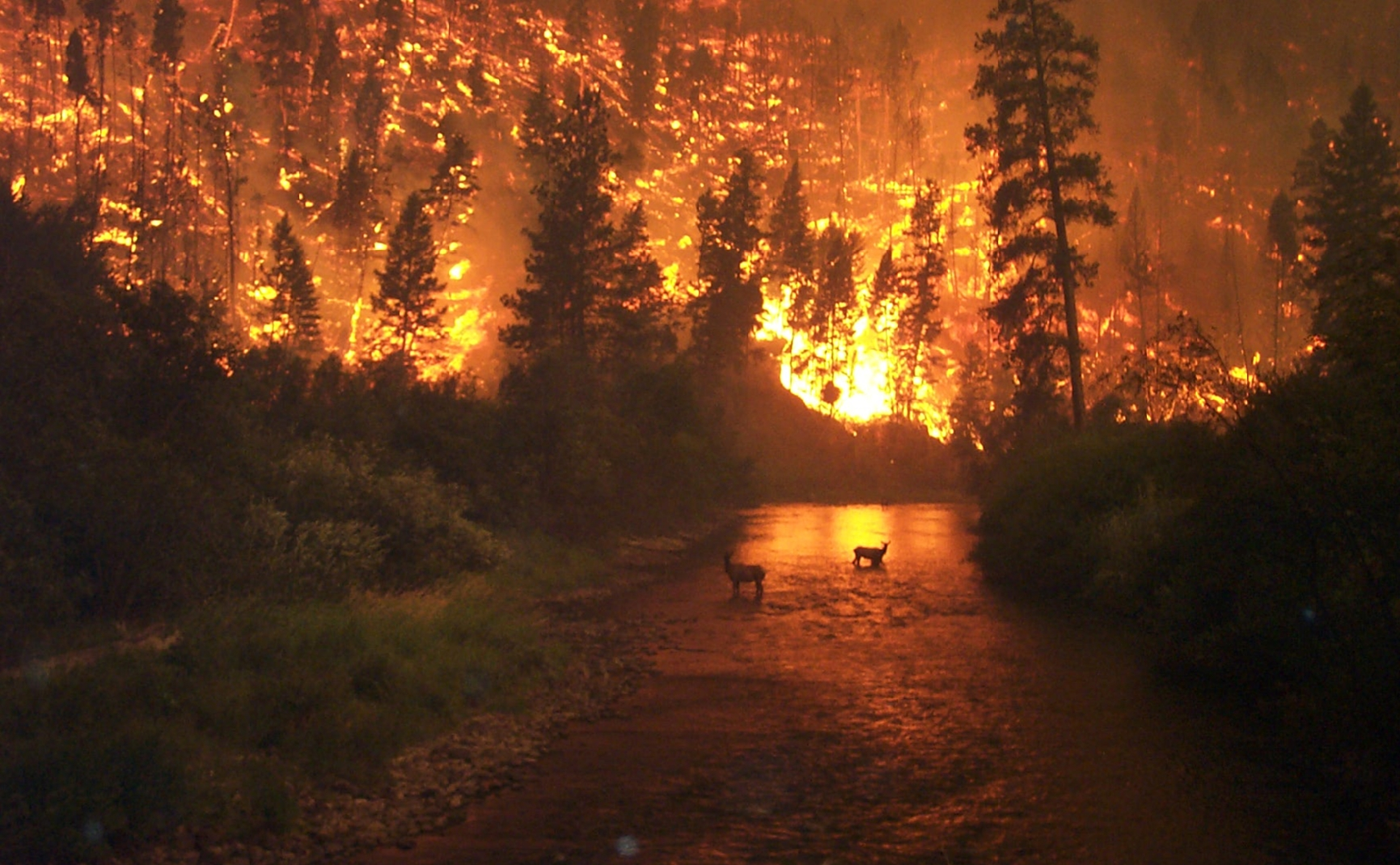
Elk at Sula by John McColgan.

Elk in the Bitterroot River is a wildlife photograph by John McColgan, a fire behavior analyst who worked for the Alaska Fire Service division of the Bureau of Land Management. It was taken on August 6, 2000, on the East Fork of the Bitterroot River on the Sula Complex, Bitterroot National Forest, Montana, United States, and is also sometimes known by the title, Bitterroot Forest Fire or, more vaguely, Montana Fire. When NASA featured it in its online Astronomy Picture of the Day series, it was called Fire on Earth. The image shows two Rocky Mountain elk seeking protection from a wildfire by standing in the river.

It was one of the Time magazine Photographs of the Year 2000, and ran in its The Year in Pictures special edition in winter 2000/2001, and the web equivalent.

McColgan took the photograph with a Kodak DC280 digital camera while standing on a bridge at Sula, Montana over the East Fork of the Bitterroot River.

McColgan's photograph has been frequently mis-attributed, with captions claiming it depicts a fire in Yellowstone National Park in 1988 and separately that it originated from a forest fire in Canada in 2003, among other erroneous attributions. The picture serves as the front cover art for Cass Sunstein's 2005 book of legal philosophy, Laws of Fear, which contains a caption that the picture's title, Elk Bath, may originate from.
