= Painted Rocks State Park =

State park in Montana, United States

- Location within Montana
- Location: Ravalli County, Montana, United States
- Nearest town: Darby, Montana
- Coordinates: 45°40′53″N 114°18′03″W
- Area: 23 acres (9.3 ha)
- Elevation: 4,754 ft (1,449 m)
- Designation: Montana state park
- Established: 1963
- Visitors: 16,747 (in 2023)
- Administrator: Montana Fish, Wildlife & Parks
- Website: Painted Rocks State Park

Painted Rocks State Park is a public recreation area located at the southern end Painted Rocks Reservoir, 24 miles (39 km) south of Darby, Montana. The state park received its name from the green, yellow and orange lichens which cover the grey and black rock walls of the granite and rhyolite cliffs. The park has Bortle scale class 1 skies which makes the state park a great place for astronomy as it is far away from light pollution.

== History ==
The reservoir is in the West Fork Valley of the Bitterroot Mountains, which was an important place for the Bitterroot Salish people. The reservoir was created with the impoundment of the West Fork of the Bitterroot River in 1939. The park was created in 1963.

== Wildlife ==
The park is home to elk, mule deer, white-tailed deer, black bear, and moose. In the 1980s, bighorn mountain sheep and peregrine falcons were reintroduced to the area. The reservoir is a stopping ground for waterfowl during spring and autumn migrations. Residential birds include osprey, great blue heron, spotted sandpiper and bald eagles.

== Activities ==
The park offers outdoor activities such as bird watching, boating, camping, fishing, canoeing, hiking, photography, picnicking, swimming, and wildlife viewing.
