= The Last Trail =

The Last Trail may refer to:

- The Last Trail, a 1909 novel by Zane Grey
- The Last Trail (1921 film), an American western film
- The Last Trail (1927 film), an American western film adaptation of Grey's novel
- The Last Trail (1933 film), an American western remake of the 1927 film

== See also ==
- The Lost Trail
