= North Fork, Idaho =

Unincorporated community in the state of Idaho, United States

Coordinates: 45°24′22″N 113°59′38″W

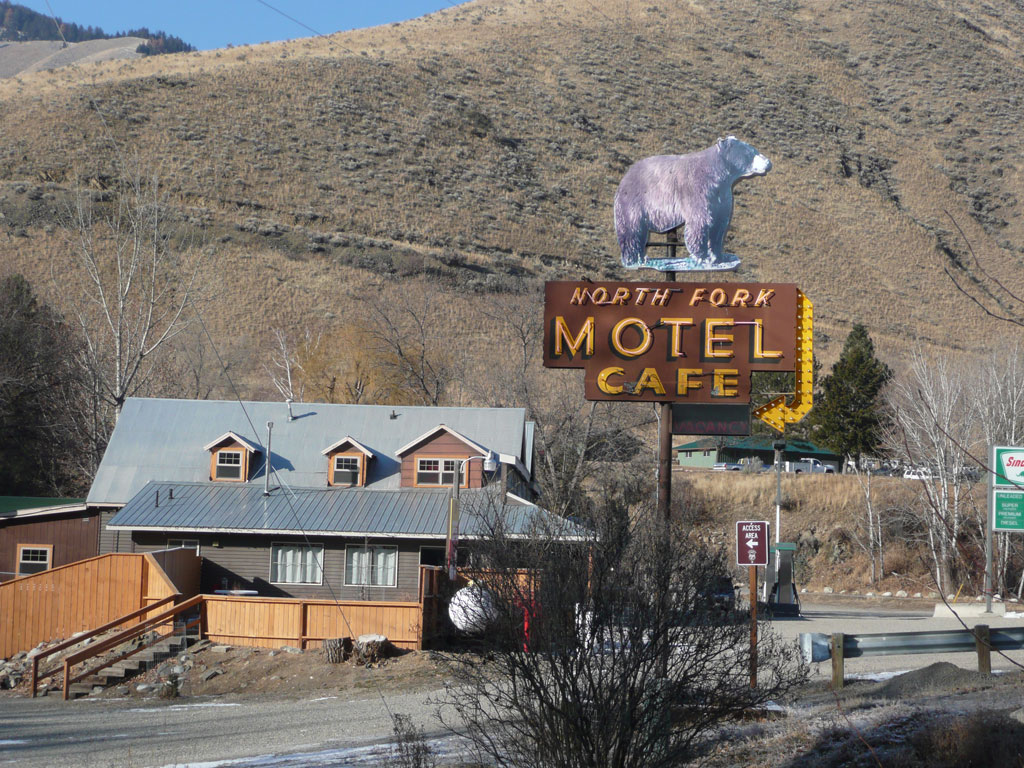
The former North Fork Store and Cafe. The U.S. Forest Service Station can be seen in the background.

North Fork is an unincorporated community in Lemhi County, Idaho. Its name is derived from confluence of the south-flowing North Fork of the Salmon River with the north-flowing main Salmon River, which makes a near-right angle turn here to flow westward across the state to Riggins. US 93 serves the community, connecting it with Salmon to the south and Lost Trail Pass to the north.

Longtime families in the community include Cummings, Prestwich, Randolph, Hughes, Smith, and Maxwell. The community of North Fork is built around the “North Fork Store” which also houses a post office and small liquor store. There are two hotels and a U.S. Forest Service Station.

The community area includes a non-denominational Christian Church .5 miles South East of North Fork and a small private Catholic Chapel some 5 miles North just off U.S. Highway 93 North.

Notable creeks with trails and stunning vistas include: Trail Gulch, Fourth of July, Hull Creek, Hughes Creek, Lick Creek, Ditch Creek, Burns Gulch, Indian Creek, and Ulysses Lookout.

Lewis and Clark traveled through this area and met with a local Indian man, Toby, who got the expedition lost crossing into Montana. Historians believe that they found Toby and enlisted his help as a guide at the confluence of the North Fork and Salmon rivers, or at the mouth of what is now known as “Hull Creek,” named after homesteader John Hull. A monument once stood to commemorate this meeting. This led to the name of the Idaho/Montana mountain pass, "Lost Trail." Also named from this, is the "Lost Trail Powder Mountain" Ski Area.

The elevation of North Fork is 3632 feet (1107 m) above sea level.

== Gallery ==
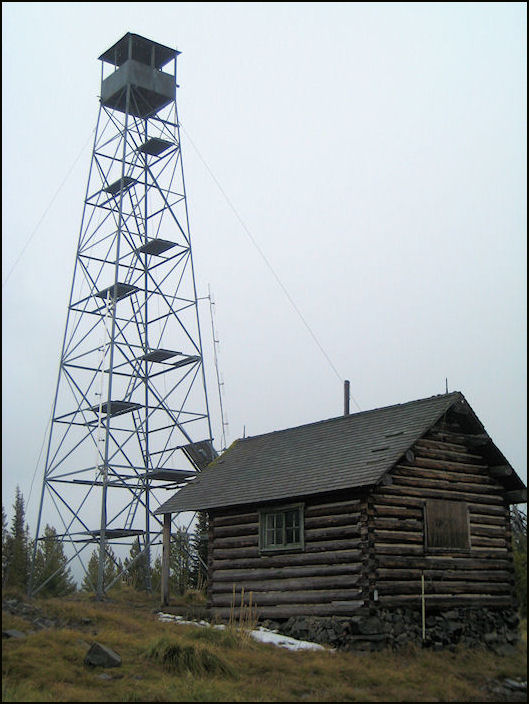
The Ulysses Mountain Lookout, located Northwest of North Fork, Idaho.

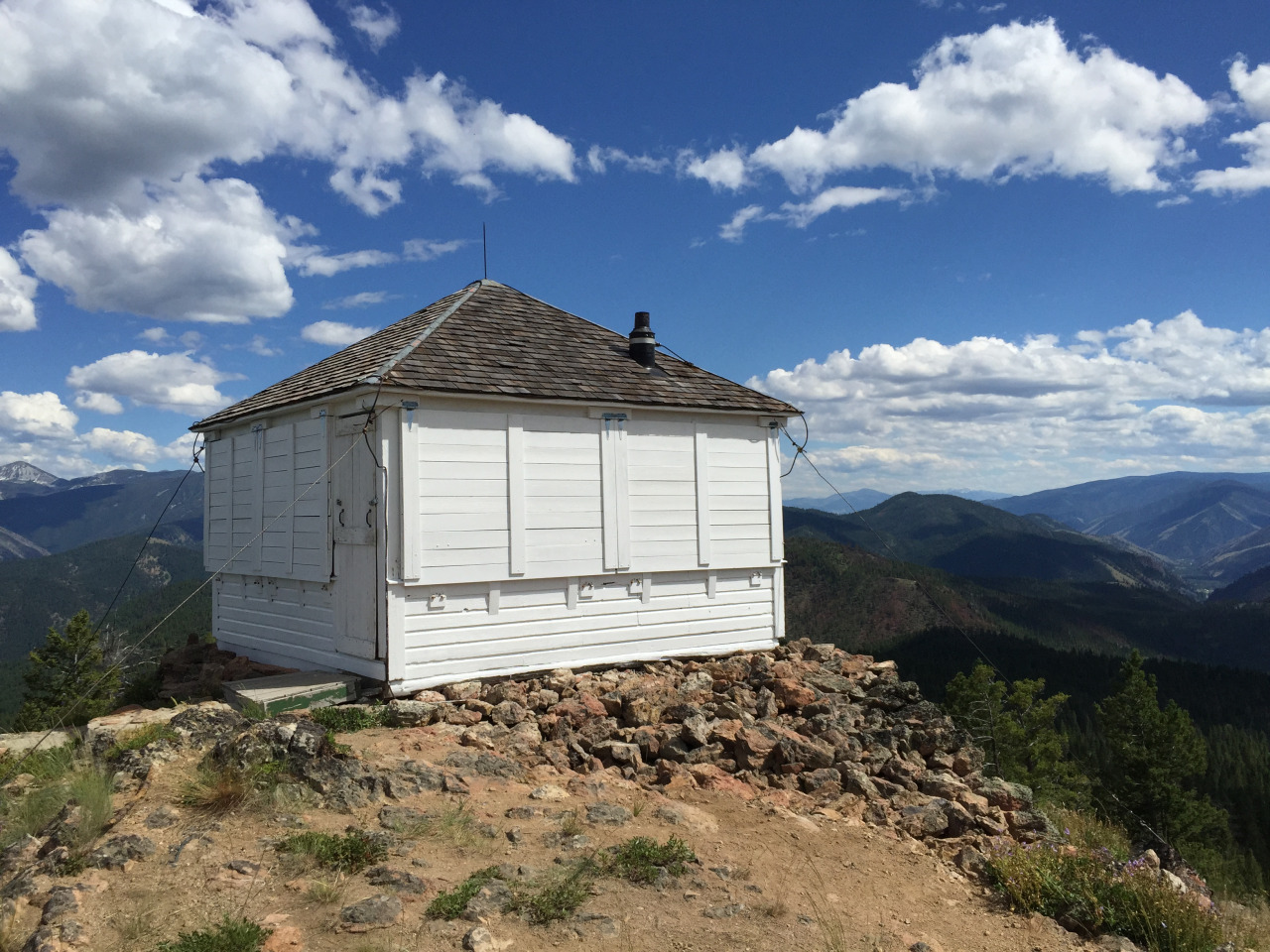
The Granite Mountain Lookout, Gibbonsville, Idaho, looking Southeast down the North Fork valley.
