= Conner, Montana =

- Census-designated place
- Location within Montana
- Coordinates: 45°55′32″N 114°07′38″W
- Country: United States
- State: Montana
- County: Ravalli

Area
  - Total: 1.82 sq mi (4.71 km^{2})
  - Land: 1.78 sq mi (4.61 km^{2})
  - Water: 0.039 sq mi (0.10 km^{2})
- Elevation: 4,045 ft (1,233 m)

Population (2020)
  - Total: 182
  - Density: 102.3/sq mi (39.49/km^{2})
- Time zone: UTC-7 (Mountain (MST))
  - Summer (DST): UTC-6 (MDT)
- ZIP code: 59827
- Area code: 406
- FIPS code: 30-17200
- GNIS feature ID: 2583799

Conner (Salish: epɫmsáwíʔ) is a census-designated place (CDP) in Ravalli County, Montana, United States. As of the 2020 census, Conner had a population of 182.

== History ==
It is named for the village of Conner, which it encompasses.

The village was named in 1906 for the first homesteader, Aaron Conner.

== Geography ==
Conner is located at the confluence of the East and West Forks of the Bitterroot River. U.S. Route 93 passes just to the east of the CDP, leading north through the Bitterroot Valley 24 miles (39 km) to Hamilton, the county seat, and south over Lost Trail Pass 69 miles (111 km) to Salmon, Idaho.

According to the United States Census Bureau, the CDP has a total area of 1.8 square miles (4.7 km^{2}), of which 1.8 square miles (4.6 km^{2}) is land and 0.039 square miles (0.1 km^{2}), or 2.18%, is water.

=== Climate ===
This climatic region is typified by large seasonal temperature differences, with warm to hot (and often humid) summers and cold (sometimes severely cold) winters. According to the Köppen Climate Classification system, Conner has a humid continental climate, abbreviated "Dfb" on climate maps.

== Demographics ==
Historical population
Census	Pop.	Note	%±
2020	182		—
U.S. Decennial Census

== Education ==
Darby K-12 Schools is the area school district.
