= Lee Metcalf National Wildlife Refuge =

Protected area in Montana, United States

- IUCN category IV (habitat/species management area)
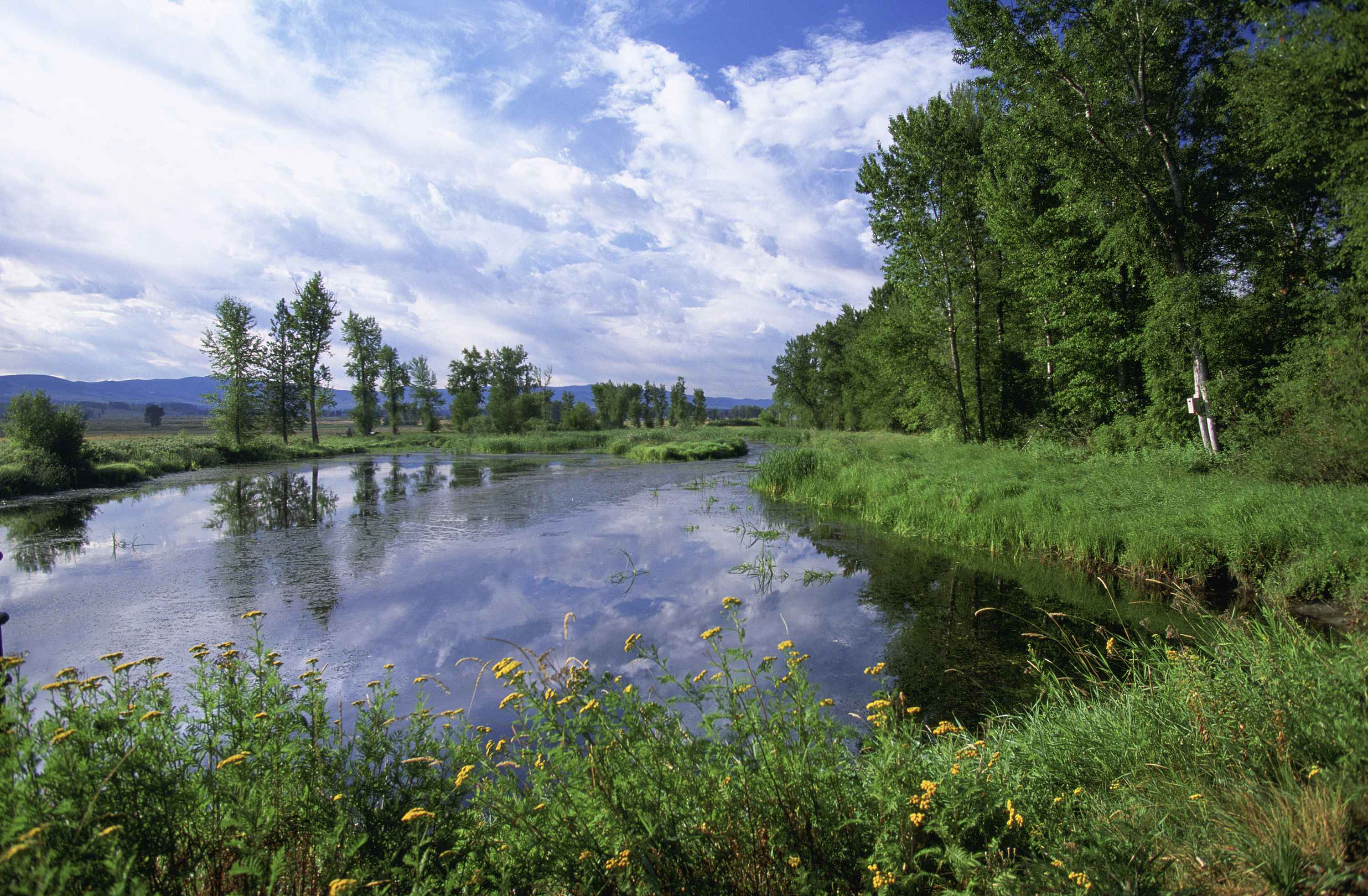

- Location within the United States Location within Montana
- Location: Ravalli County, Montana, USA
- Nearest city: Missoula, MT463339N 1140451W
- Coordinates: 46°33′39″N 114°04′51″W
- Area: 2,800 acres (1,100 ha)
- Established: 1964
- Governing body: U.S. Fish and Wildlife Service
- Website: Lee Metcalf National Wildlife Refuge

Lee Metcalf National Wildlife Refuge is a 2,800-acre (1,100 ha) National Wildlife Refuge (NWR) along the Bitterroot River in southwestern Montana, U.S. Established in 1964 as Ravalli NWR, it was renamed in 1978 in honor of the late Senator Lee Metcalf, a native of Montana. The refuge was set aside for the protection of migratory bird species. About 235 species of birds have been documented on the refuge, with over 100 nesting there. Additionally, 37 species of mammals, and 17 species of reptiles and amphibians also have been documented.

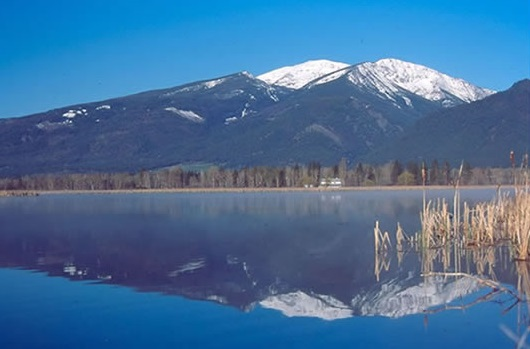

The refuge's wildlife viewing area covers 160 acres (65 ha) of wetlands and riparian woodland. It includes two nature trails and a paved, wheelchair-accessible trail from the parking lot to the picnic area. The viewing area is equipped with a viewing and fishing structure, outdoor restroom facilities, benches, and an information kiosk.

One of the nature trails, the Lee Metcalf Wildlife Viewing Trail, was designated as a National Recreation Trail.
