= The Lost Trail =

The Lost Trail may refer to:

- The Lost Trail (1926 film), 1926 silent film directed by J. P. McGowan
- The Lost Trail (1945 film), 1945 American Western film directed by Lambert Hillyer
- The Lost Trail, a 1907 play by Anthony E. Wills

== See also ==
- Lost Trail
- The Last Trail
