= Lost Trail Powder Mountain =

Ski area on the Montana-Idaho border, United States

- Location in Idaho Lost Trail Powder Mountain (Montana) Lost Trail Powder Mountain (the United States)
- Location: Lost Trail Pass; Lemhi County, Idaho & Ravalli County, Montana
- Nearest city: Salmon, Idaho & Hamilton, Montana
- Coordinates: 45.692°N 113.952°W
- Vertical: 1,800 ft (550 m)
- Top elevation: 8,200 ft (2,500 m)
- Base elevation: 6,400 ft (1,950 m) lowest lift - #3; 7,000 ft (2,134 m) main base area
- Skiable area: 900 acres (3.6 km^{2})
- Trails: 60+: 20% easiest; 60% more difficult; 20% most difficult
- Longest run: 1.2 miles (2 km)
- Lift system: 5 double chairs 3 rope tows
- Terrain parks: 2
- Snowfall: 300 in (760 cm)
- Snowmaking: none
- Night skiing: none
- Website: losttrail.com

Lost Trail Powder Mountain is an alpine ski area in the western United States, on the Montana-Idaho border in the northern Rocky Mountains. In the Bitterroot Range, it is at the junction of US Highway 93 and Montana State Highway 43 at Lost Trail Pass, about one mile (1.6 km) northwest of Chief Joseph Pass, which is on the Continental Divide.

The summit elevation of Saddle Mountain is 8,200 feet (2,500 m) above sea level with a vertical drop of 1,800 feet (550 m). The main base area, which includes the parking lot and lodge, is at 7,000 feet (2,134 m) and in Montana, as are the majority of the runs. Chairlift #1 runs approximately along the Idaho-Montana border; the terrain to its south, including Chairlift #2, is in Idaho.

Until 2003, the top of Chair #1 & Chair #2 was the summit of the area, at 7,800 feet (2,380 m), and the vertical drop was 1,200 feet (370 m). When chairlift #3 (Huckleberry) was added on the Montana side in 2002, it lowered the base by 200 vertical feet (60 m). The addition of Chair #4 on Saddle Mountain, which opened in February 2003 after delays, increased the area's vertical drop by 400 feet (120 m). The slopes on the mountain are primarily east-facing.

The ski area is located immediately west of US-93, which descends northward into Montana.

The ski area is open four days per week (Thursday through Sunday) and holidays. The business office is to the north in Montana at Conner, about midway to Hamilton.

== Terrain ==
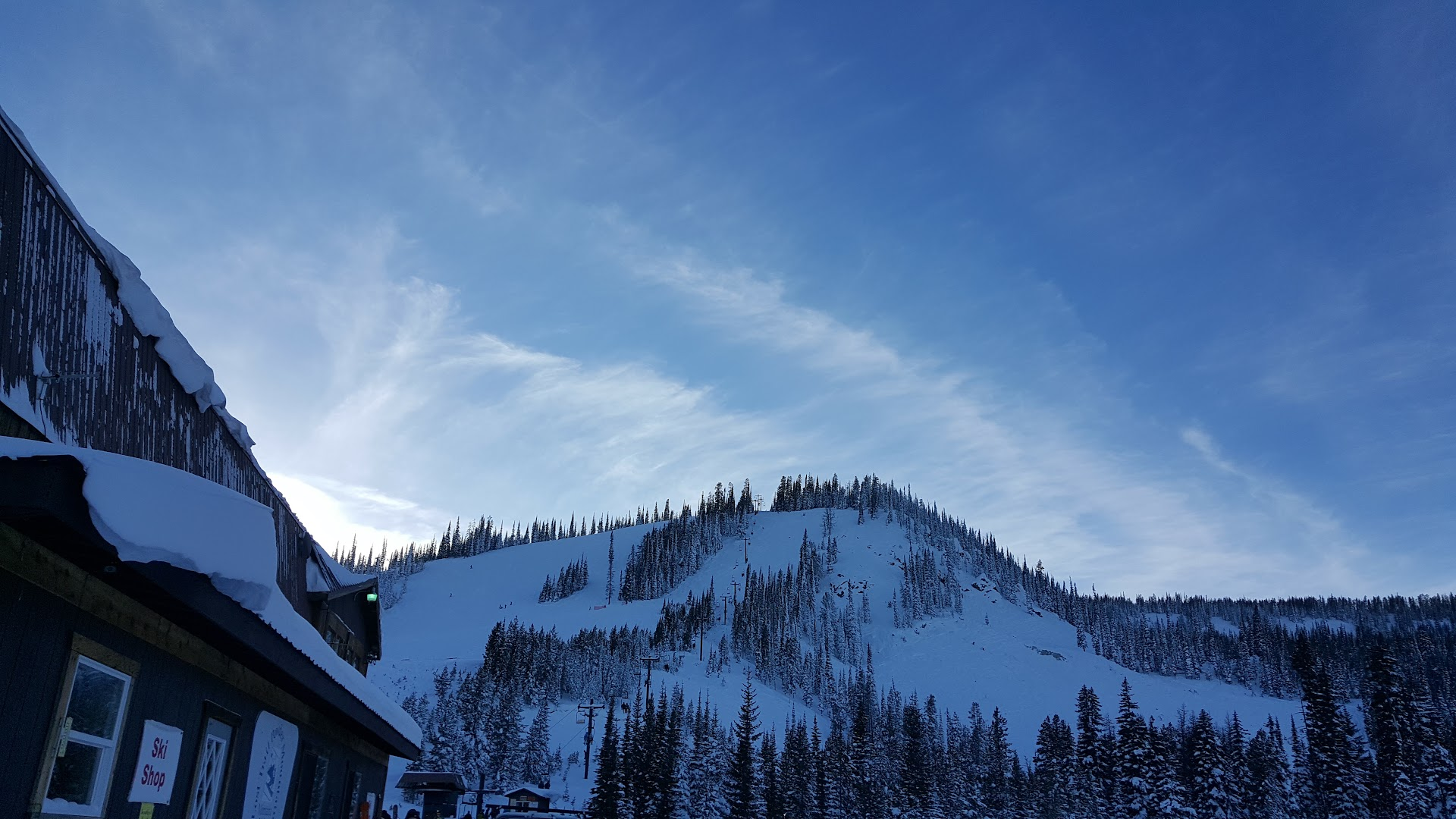
The Lost Trail Ski mountain and lodge

The mountain is open to both skiers and snowboarders. Terrain ranges from rails, tables, and wallrides to powder pillows and cliff lines.

== Plane crash ==
In 2014, a vintage World War II-era aircraft lost control in a late spring snow squall on June 17 and crashed into the ski area's main parking lot. The Grumman G-21A Goose caught fire and was completely destroyed; its only occupant, the pilot, was killed. The day lodge had hosted a conference that Tuesday which concluded shortly before the late afternoon incident. The last attendee to depart was in his car and was nearly struck by the plane, which impacted about fifty feet (15 m) away after a near-vertical flat spin descent. The Minnesota pilot, age 62, was ferrying the twin-engine amphibious plane, originally from Florida, to Hamilton and had made earlier stops that day in Dillon and Salmon, Idaho.

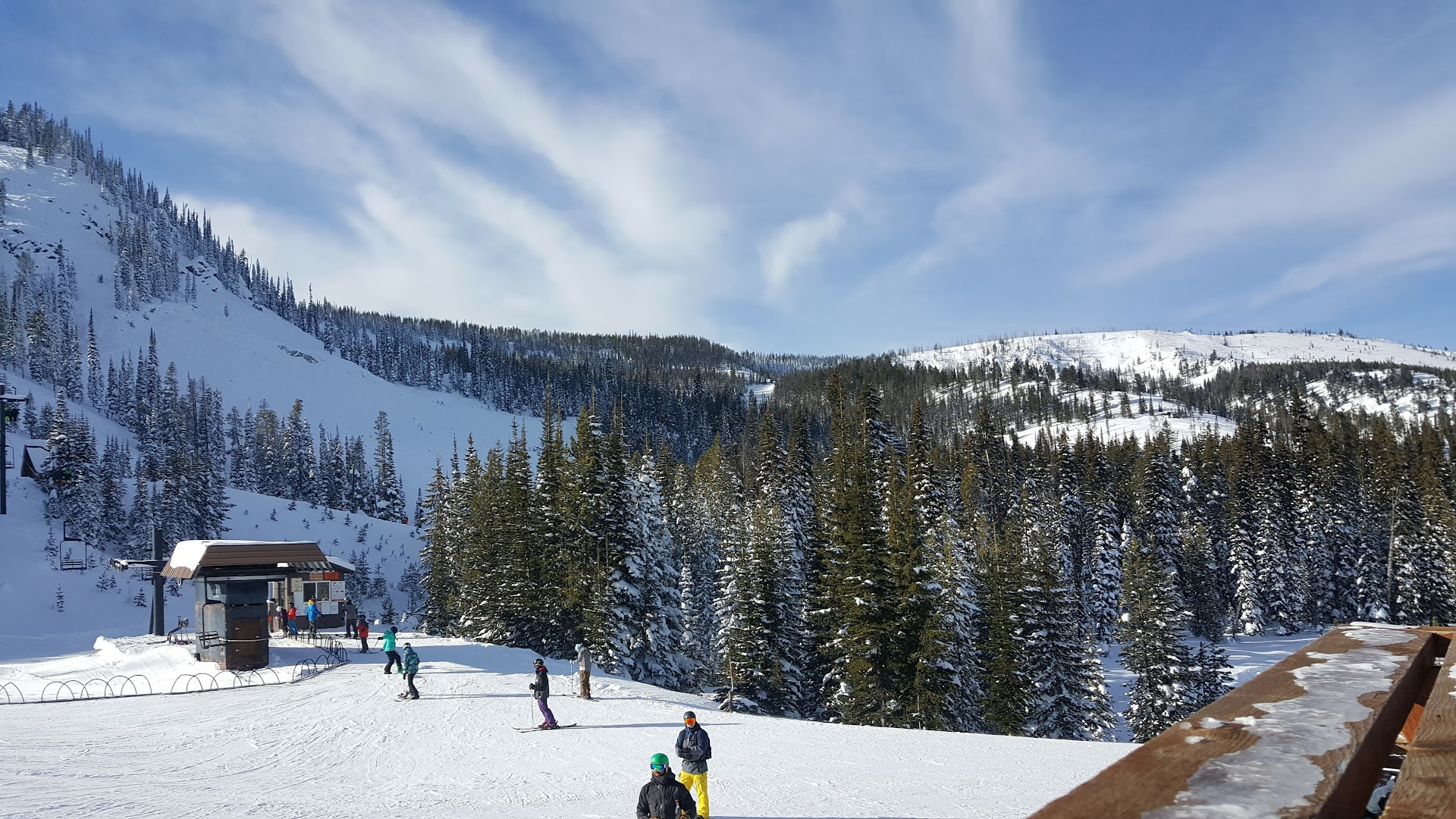
The base of chair #1

== Video ==
- You Tube – Lost Trail Powder Mountain – 2010
