= Lost Trail Station =

- U.S. National Register of Historic Places
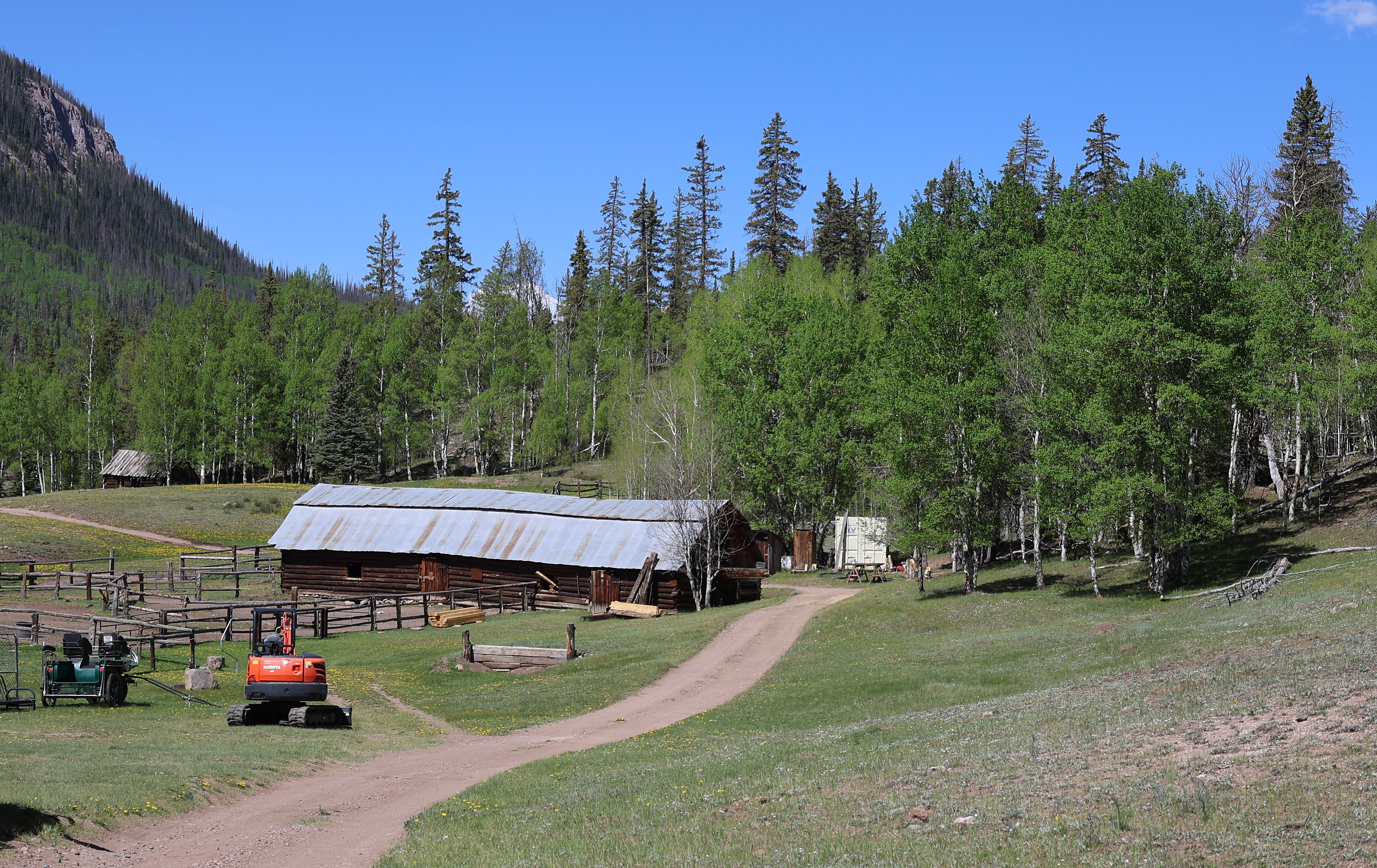
- The 1877 log barn

- Location within Colorado Location within the United States
- Nearest city: Creede, Colorado
- Coordinates: 37°46′08″N 107°21′45″W
- Area: 25.7 acres (10.4 ha)
- Built: 1877
- Built by: Barber, John
- Architectural style: Pioneer Log
- NRHP reference No.: 11000219
- Added to NRHP: April 27, 2011

The Lost Trail Station, in Hinsdale County, Colorado near Creede, Colorado, was built in 1877. It was listed on the National Register of Historic Places in 2011.

It operated as a stagecoach station from 1877 to about 1895.

John Barber and his wife offered food and lodging to stagecoach travelers there. A large log barn was built.

The listing included three contributing buildings and three contributing sites.

It is located at 81125 Forest Service Road 520.
