= Lost Trail Pass =

Mountain pass in the Bitterroot Mountains

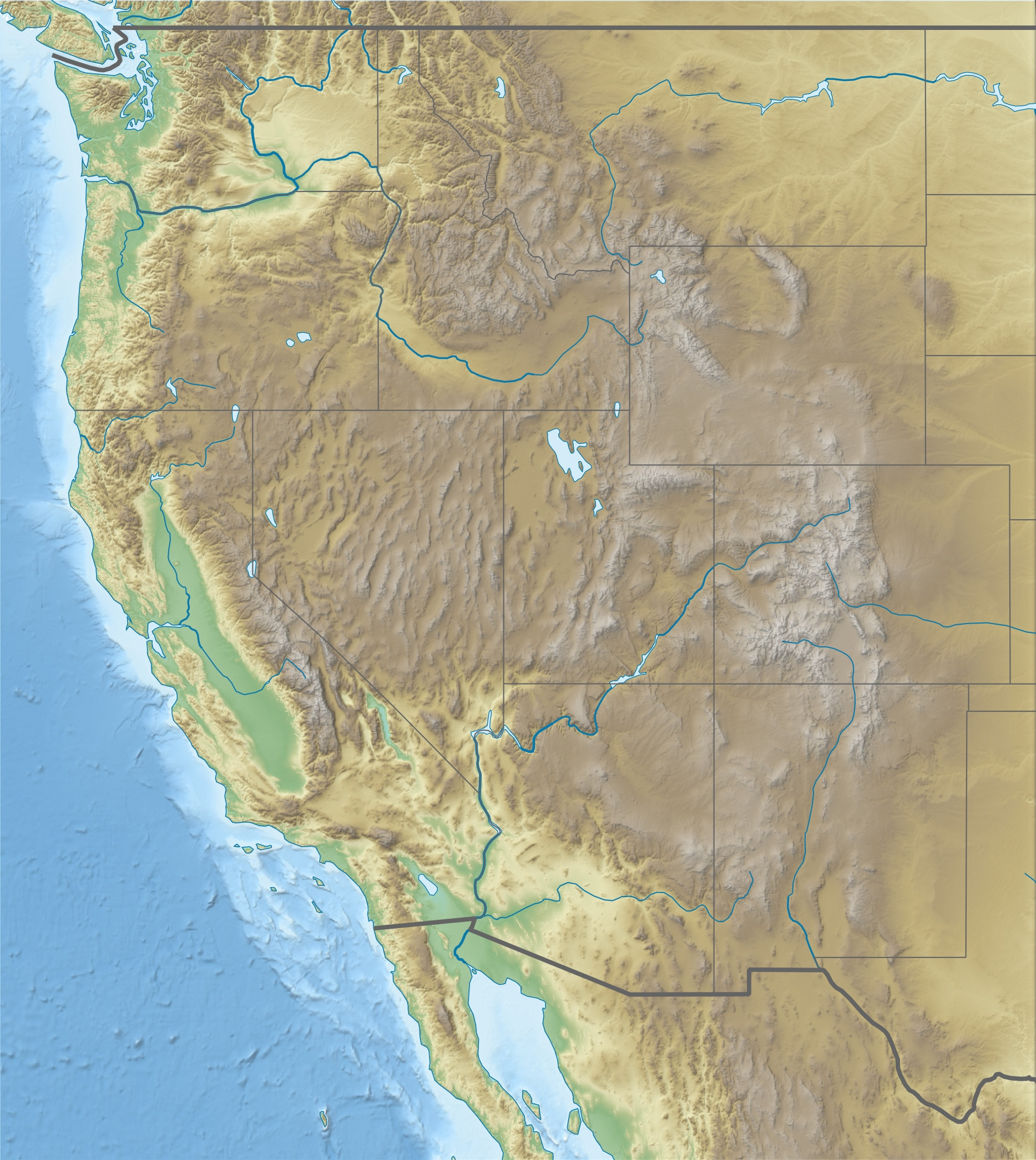
- Location within USA West Location within Idaho
- Elevation: 7,014 feet (2,138 m)
- Traversed by: US 93

Third Approach
- Location: Lemhi County, Idaho / Ravalli County, Montana, U.S.
- Range: Bitterroot Mountains, Bitterroot Range, Rocky Mountains
- Coordinates: 45°41.6′N 113°56.9′W

Lost Trail Pass is a mountain pass in the Rocky Mountains of the northwestern United States, on the border of Idaho and Montana in the Bitterroot Mountains. The pass is at an elevation of 7,014 feet (2,138 m) above sea level and is traversed by U.S. Highway 93.

The pass is about a half mile (1 km) west of the Continental Divide, which retreats eastward at this point, inside Montana along the Ravalli–Beaverhead County border, toward Butte. Southeast of Lost Trail Pass, the divide straddles the state line into Yellowstone National Park and continues in Wyoming.

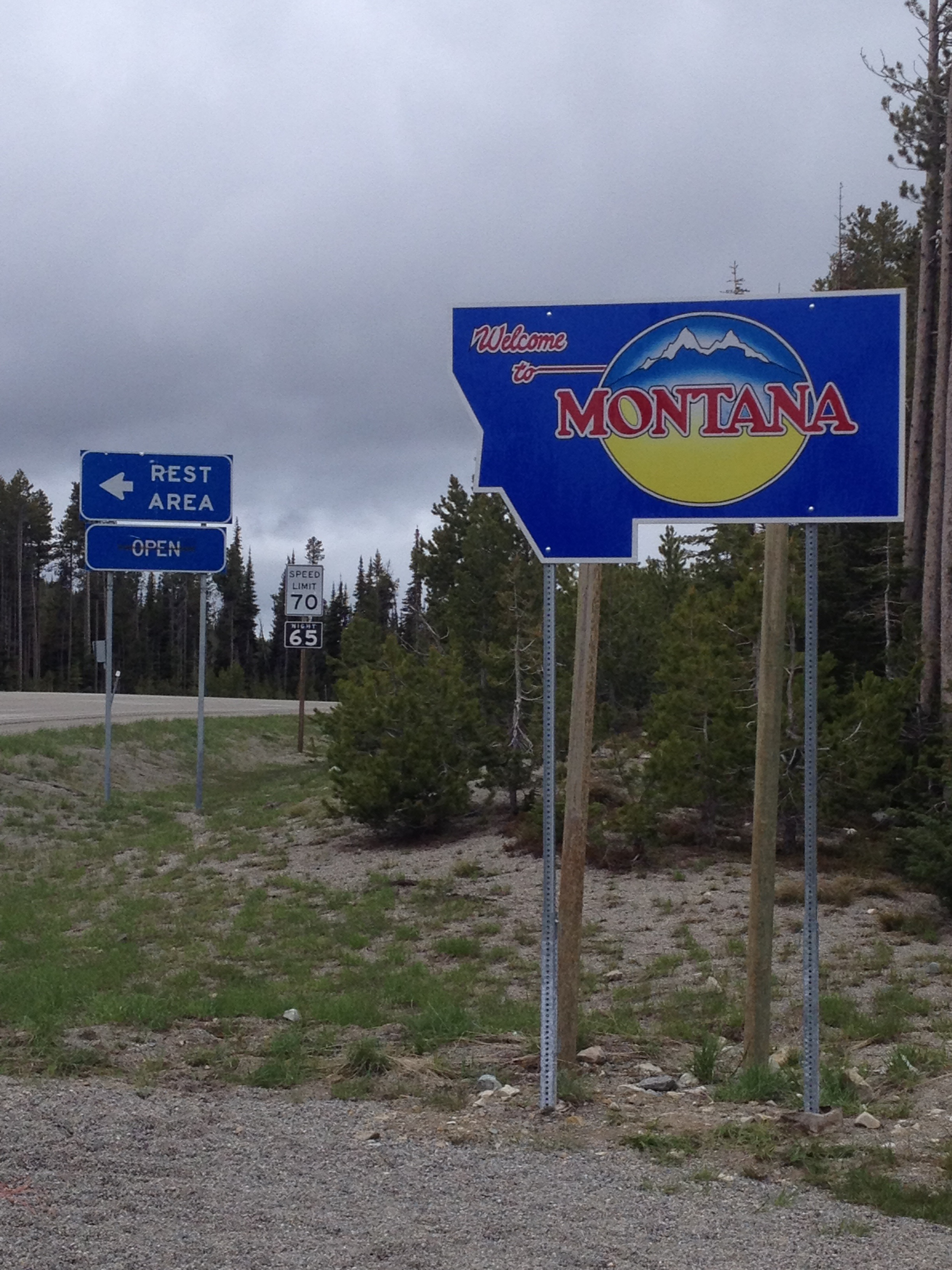
Entering Montana on US 93 at Lost Trail Pass

South of the pass in Idaho is the north fork of the Salmon River, which descends with US 93 to North Fork to join the main Salmon River. In Montana, US 93 drops northward into the Bitterroot River Valley and gradually descends toward Hamilton, Lolo, and Missoula.

In 1805 Lewis and Clark crossed the divide between Lemhi County (Idaho) and Ravalli County (Montana), approximately 1.3 miles (2 km) northwest of Lost Trail Pass, to enter the Bitterroot Valley on September 4. They later rested for a few days at Travelers' Rest, near present-day Lolo, in preparation for their crossing over the snowy Bitterroots at Lolo Pass back into present-day Idaho, following the Lolo Trail, north of US 12.

The Lost Trail Powder Mountain ski area is at the pass, immediately west of US 93, with lifts and runs in both states.
