= Bitterroot River =

Bitterroot River St. Mary's River
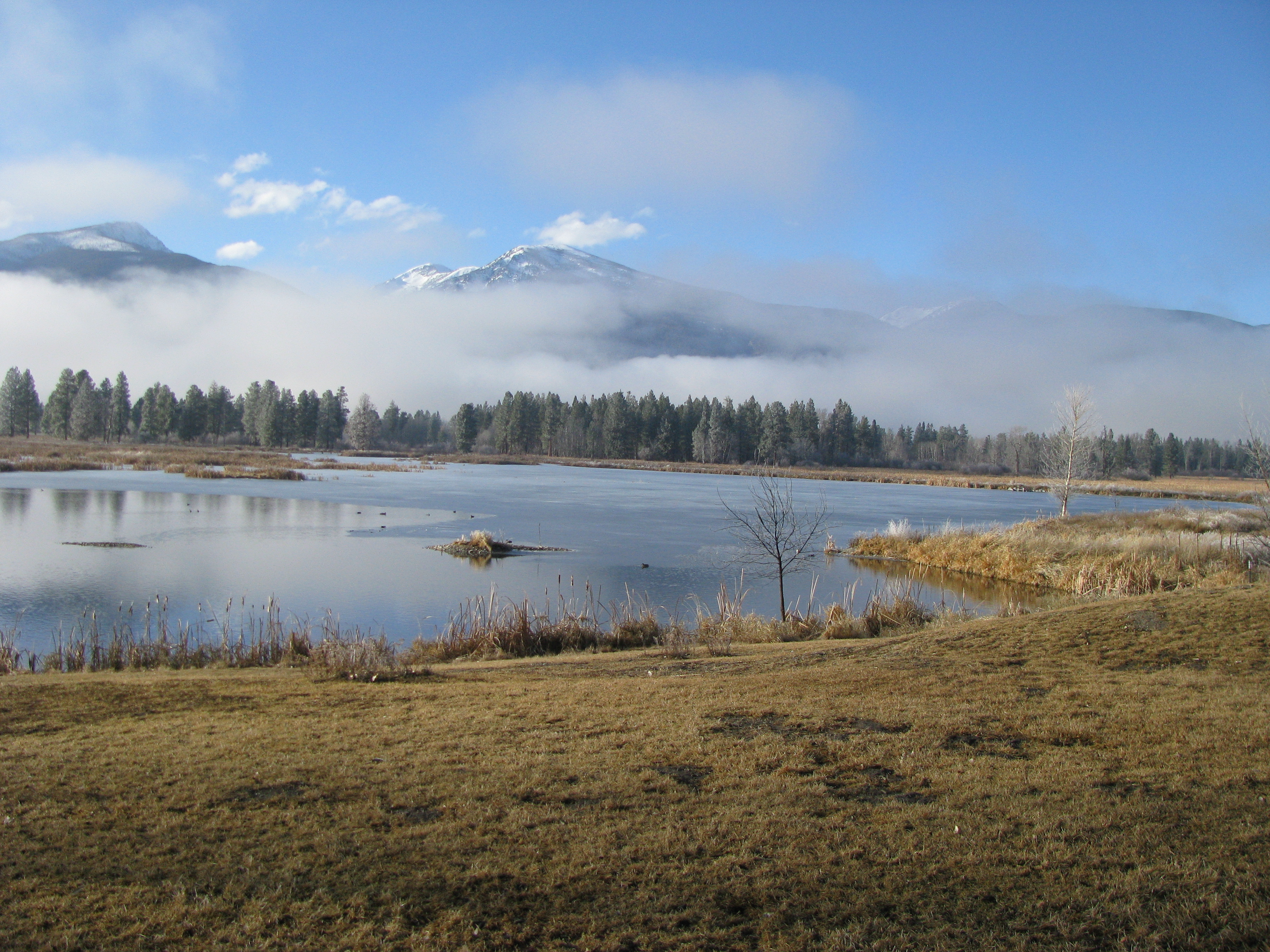
- Ice fog hanging over Bitterroot River at Lee Metcalf National Wildlife Refuge
- Native name: Spet-lum (Salishan languages); In-shi-ttogh-tae-tkhu (Salishan languages)

Location
- Country: United States
- State: Montana
- Region: Missoula and Ravalli County, Montana

Physical characteristics
- Source: Confluence of
  - coordinates: 45°56′24″N 114°07′38″W
- Mouth: Confluence with Clark Fork River
  - location: Missoula, Montana
  - coordinates: 46°51′42″N 114°07′09″W
  - elevation: 3,104 ft (946 m)
- Length: 75 mi (121 km), South-north
- Basin size: 2,814 mi^{2} (7,290 km^{2})
- Discharge
  - location: Missoula
  - average: 2,370 cu ft/s (67 m^{3}/s)
  - minimum: 270 cu ft/s (7.6 m^{3}/s)
  - maximum: 38,300 cu ft/s (1,080 m^{3}/s)

Basin features
- River system: Columbia Basin

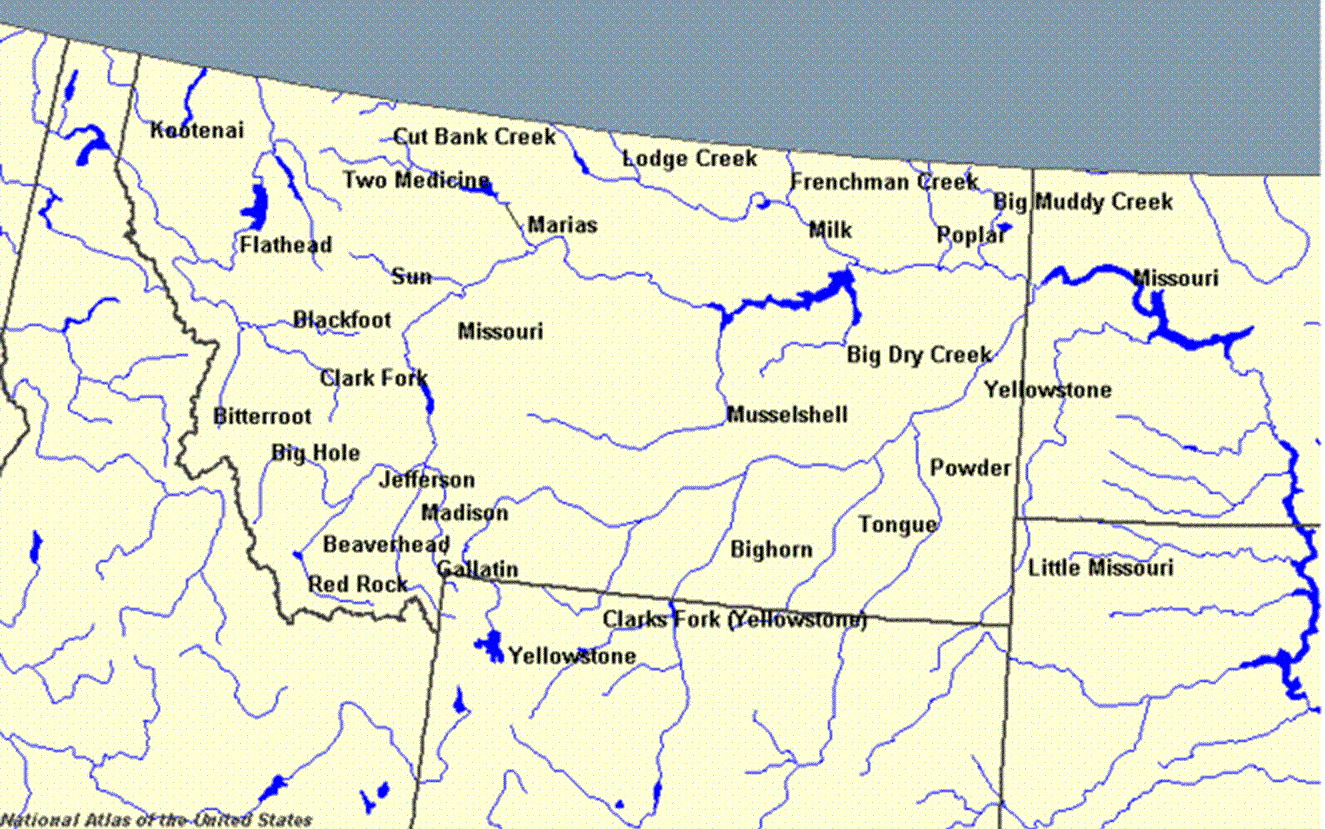
Principal Montana rivers with the Bitterroot in the west

The Bitterroot River is a northward flowing 84-mile (135 km) river running through the Bitterroot Valley, from the confluence of its West and East forks near Conner in southern Ravalli County to its confluence with the Clark Fork River near Missoula in Missoula County, in western Montana. The Clark Fork River is a tributary to the Columbia River and ultimately, the Pacific Ocean. The Bitterroot River is a Blue Ribbon trout fishery with a healthy population of native westslope cutthroat trout and bull trout. It is the third most fly fished river in Montana behind the Madison and Big Horn Rivers.

== History ==
The Bitterroot River is named for the bitterroot plant Lewisia rediviva, whose fleshy taproot was an important food source for Native Americans. The Bitterroot Salish called the river Spet-lum for "Place of the bitterroot" and In-shi-ttogh-tae-tkhu for "Willow River". French trappers knew the plant as racine amère (bitter root). The early Jesuit priest, Father De Smet, named it St. Mary's River. By the time of Washington Territory surveys by Governor Isaac I. Stevens in 1853, the name had been translated to Bitterroot River.

== Watershed ==
The Bitterroot River watershed drains 2,889 square miles (7,480 km^{2}) in Ravalli and Missoula counties. The Bitterroot Valley averages 7–10 miles wide and is uniquely low gradient for western Montana streams. The river mainstem begins at the confluence of the East Fork Bitterroot River and the West Fork Bitterroot River. From there the mainstem receives numerous tributaries from the Bitterroot Mountains to the west and the Sapphire Mountains to the east. The watershed is a snowmelt dominated system with large interannual variations in streamflow and peak flows from mid-May to mid-June. The variation is compounded by extensive irrigation withdrawals and upstream reservoir storage at Painted Rocks Reservoir on the West Fork Bitterroot River with the most severely dewatered reaches along 12 miles (19 km) of the river located between Woodside Crossing near Corvallis and Bell Crossing near Stevensville.

Major tributaries include Skalkaho Creek, and Lolo Creek. The Skalkaho Creek drainage subwatershed originates in the Sapphire Mountains and drains 132 square miles (340 km^{2}) and flows 28 miles (45 km) west-northwest to it confluence with the Bitterroot River. Lolo Creek is the primary tributary in the northern portion of the Bitterroot watershed. Lolo Creek is often completely dewatered in late summer in its lower 2 miles (3.2 km) due to withdrawals for irrigation and rural water use.

== Habitat and wildlife ==
Although the Bitterroot River passes close by to many residential areas, it is an excellent place for wildlife viewing. Many species of ducks and waterfowl are common along with osprey (Pandion haliaetus), bald eagles (Haliaeetus leucocephalus), and heron. Elk (Cervus canadensis), moose (Alces alces), and both white-tailed deer (Odocoileus virginianus) and mule deer (Odocoileus hemionus) frequent the river as a source of water and to graze near its banks. The most notable wildlife viewing locale along the river is the famous Lee Metcalf National Wildlife Refuge, named for U.S. Senator Lee Metcalf, a pioneer of the conservation movement.

A renowned fly fishing stream, the Bitterroot River mainstem and many of its tributaries are important migratory corridors and spawning habitat for native westslope cutthroat trout (Oncorhynchus clarki lewisi) and bull trout (Salvelinus confluentus). Other native fish include mountain whitefish (Prosopium williamsoni), longnose sucker (Catostomus catostomus), slimy sculpin (Cottus cognatus), and longnose dace (Rhinichthys cataractae).

Rainbow trout (Oncorhynchus mykiss) and brown trout (Salmo trutta) are popular gamefish but are not native to the Bitterroot River watershed and pose significant threats to native trout. In Montana, rainbow trout are only native to the upper Kootenai River in the state's extreme northwest corner. Non-native rainbow trout pose one of the greatest threats to cutthroat trout by hybridization, producing "cutbows". In addition, non-native brook trout (Salvelinus fontinalis) often displace native cutthroat trout and bull trout in small streams.

== Recreation ==
The towns along the Bitterroot River, including Hamilton, Stevensville, Missoula, and Darby are popular destinations for fly fishing, with rainbow trout being fairly prevalent and with smaller populations of brown trout and westslope cutthroat trout. The Bitterroot is a class I river from the confluence of the East and West forks to its confluence with the Clark Fork River for public access for recreational purposes.

== Gallery ==
Images of the Bitterroot River Watershed

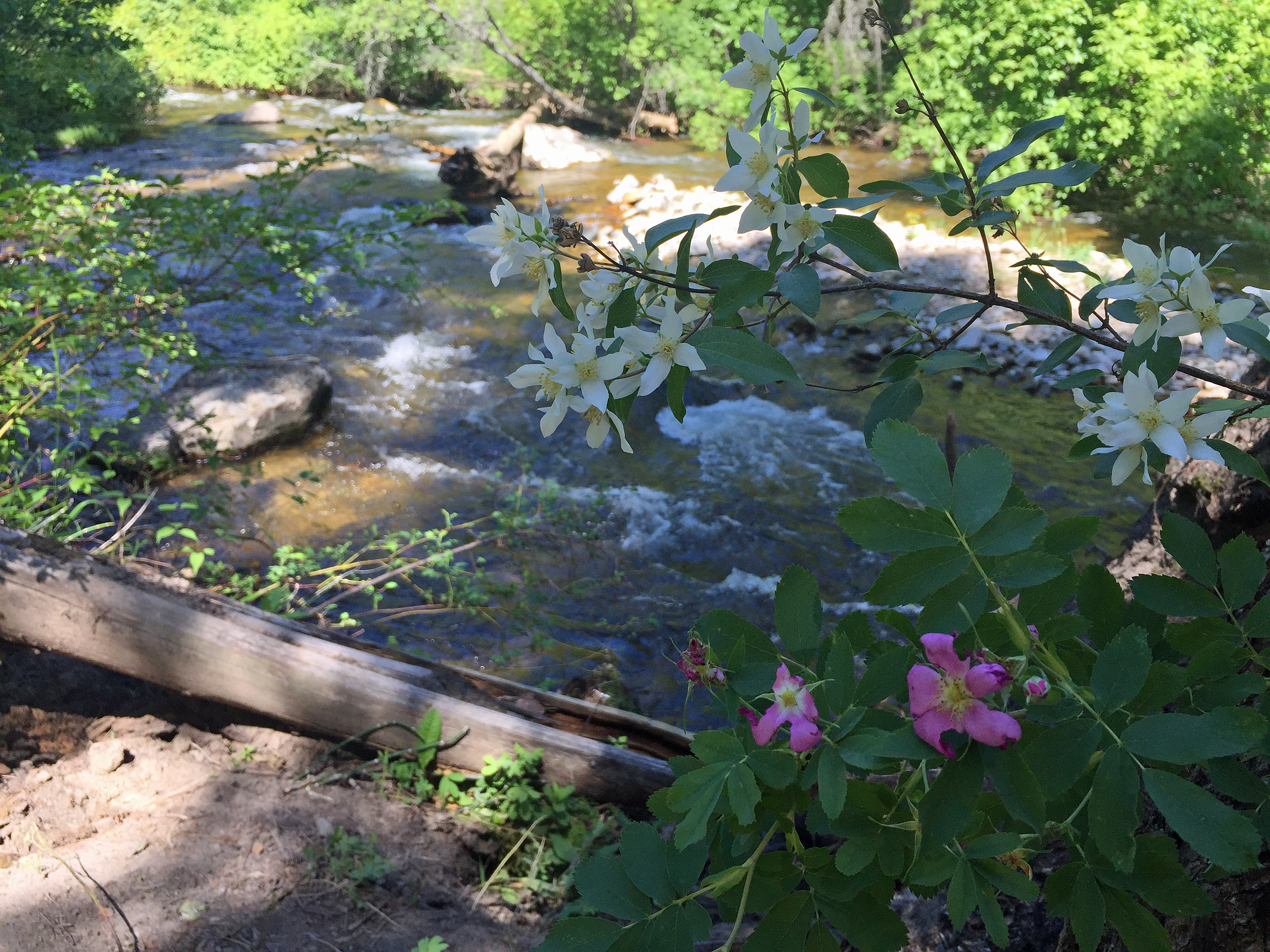
Skalkaho Creek at Centennial Grove with white-flowered Lewis' mock-orange (Philadelphus lewisii) discovered and named for Meriwether Lewis, and pink-flowered Woods' rose (Rosa woodsii)

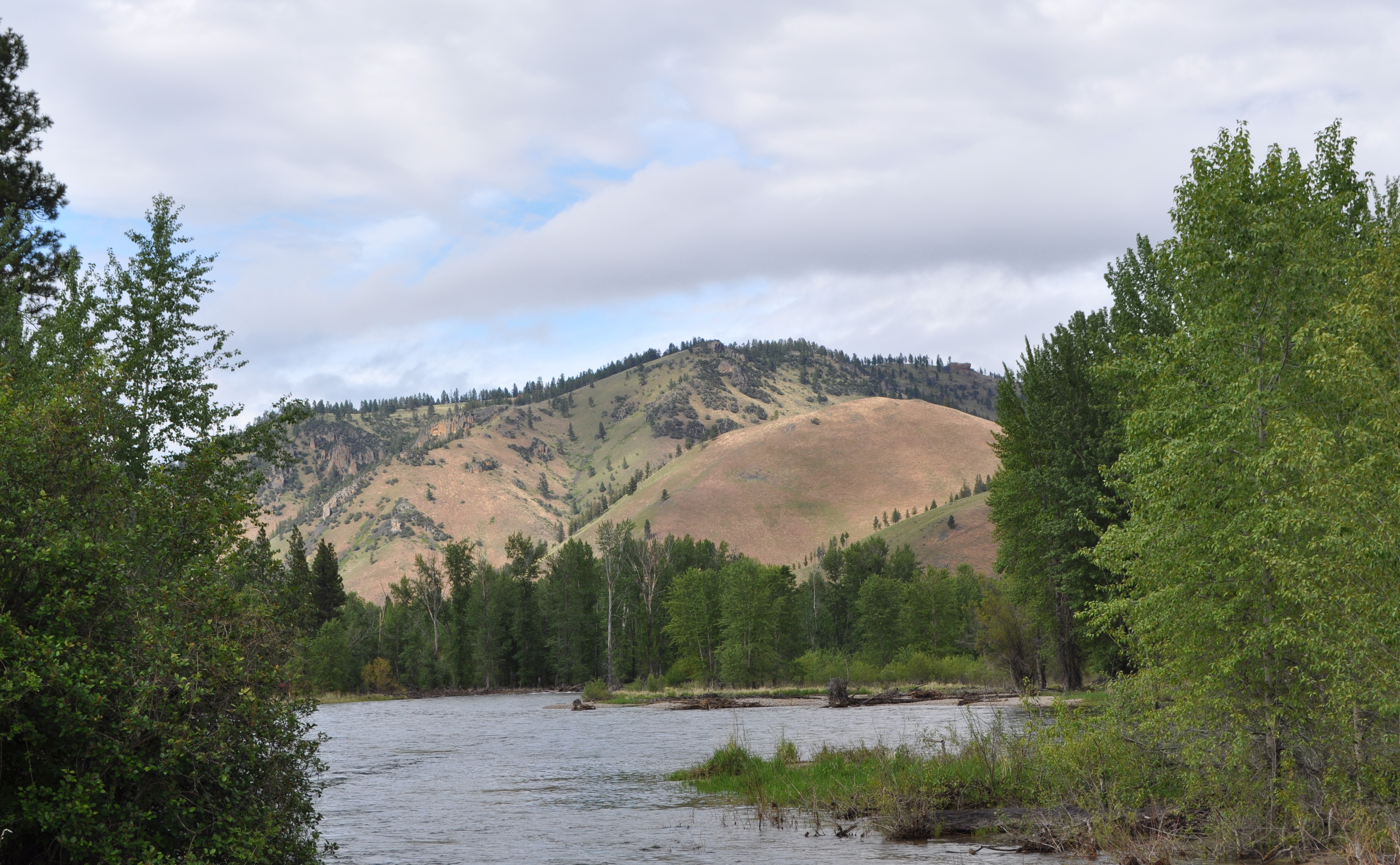
Bitterroot River near Darby, Montana

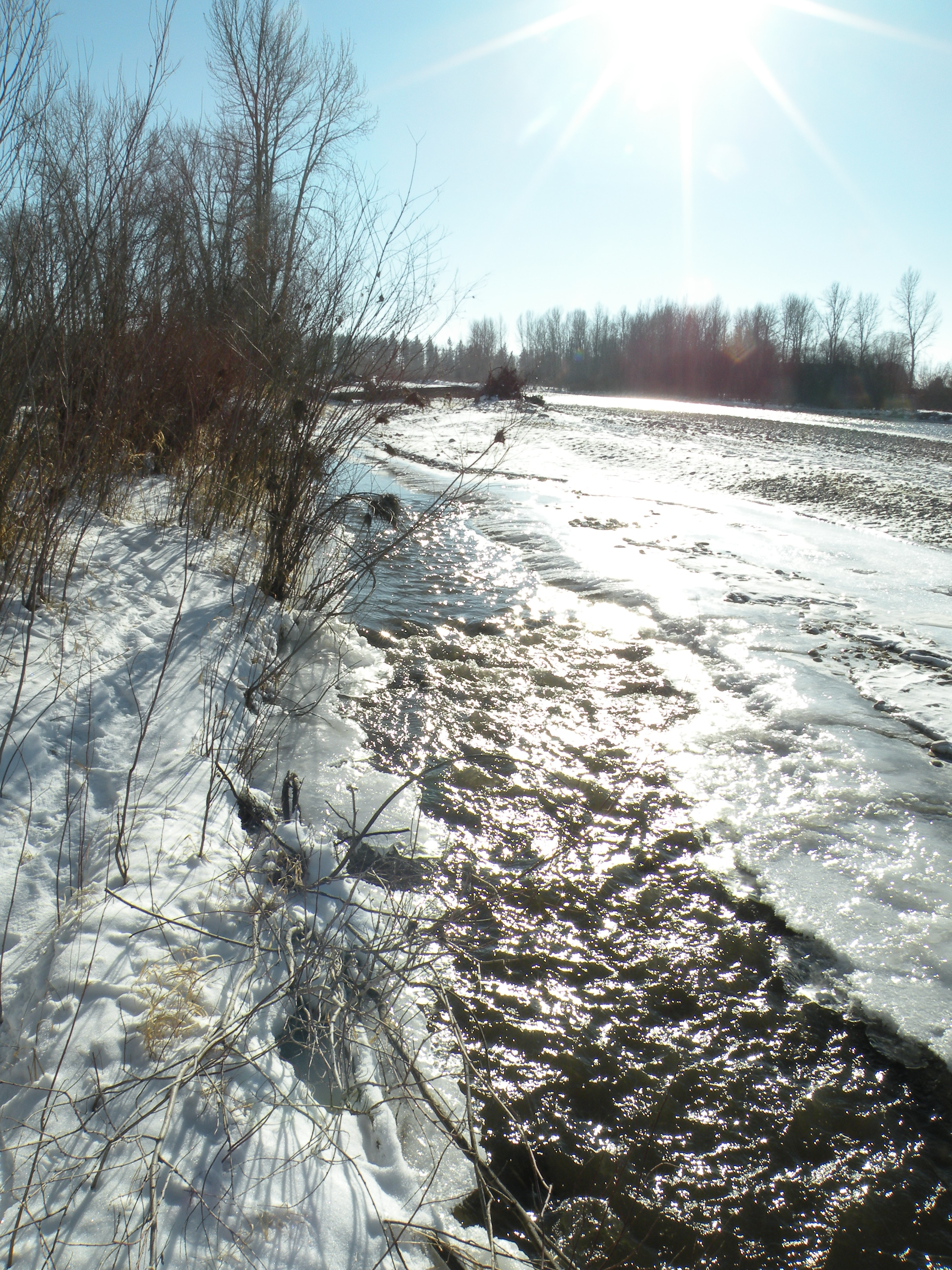
Bitterroot River in Winter

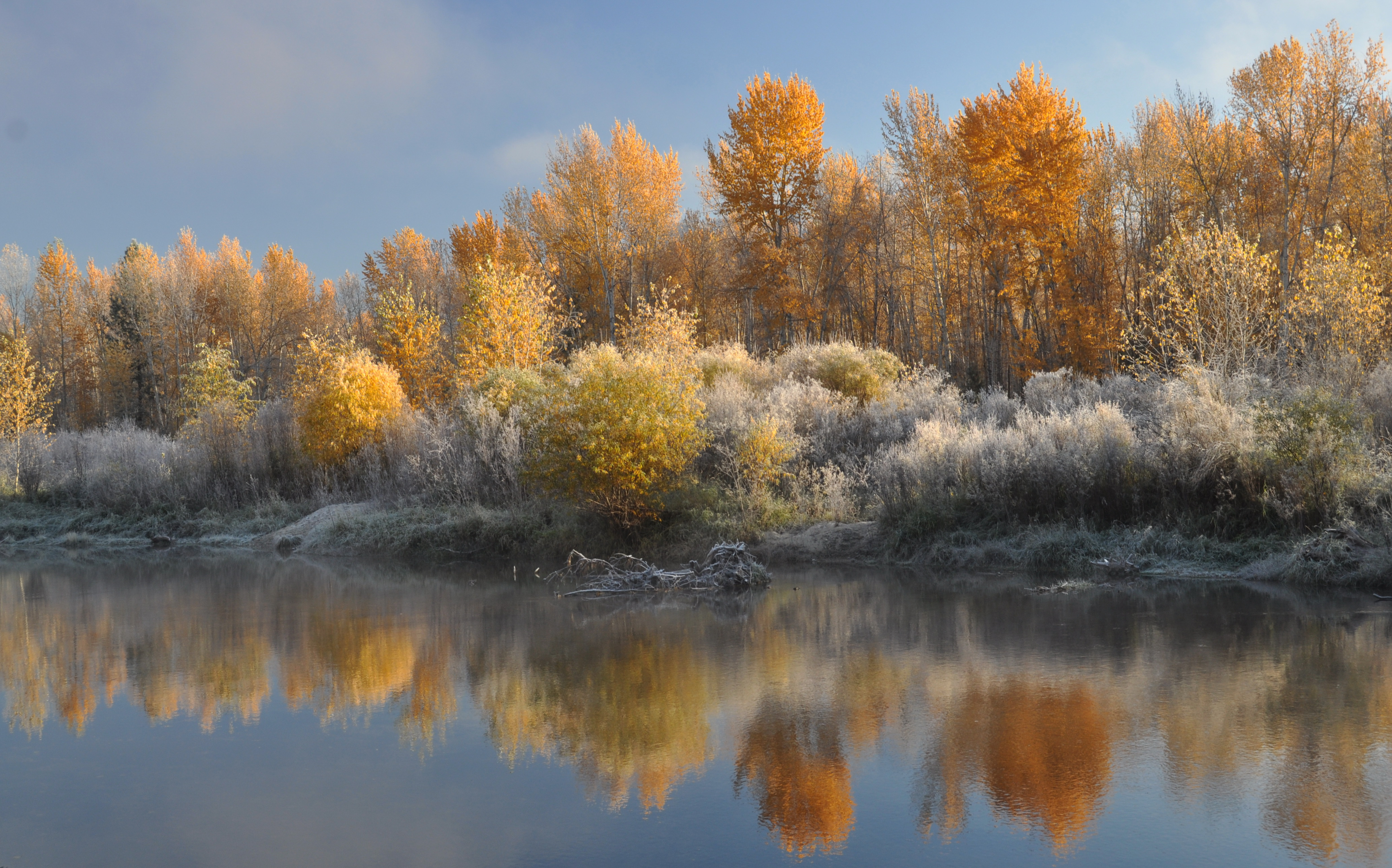
Bitterroot River from Chief Looking Glass State Park near Florence, Montana

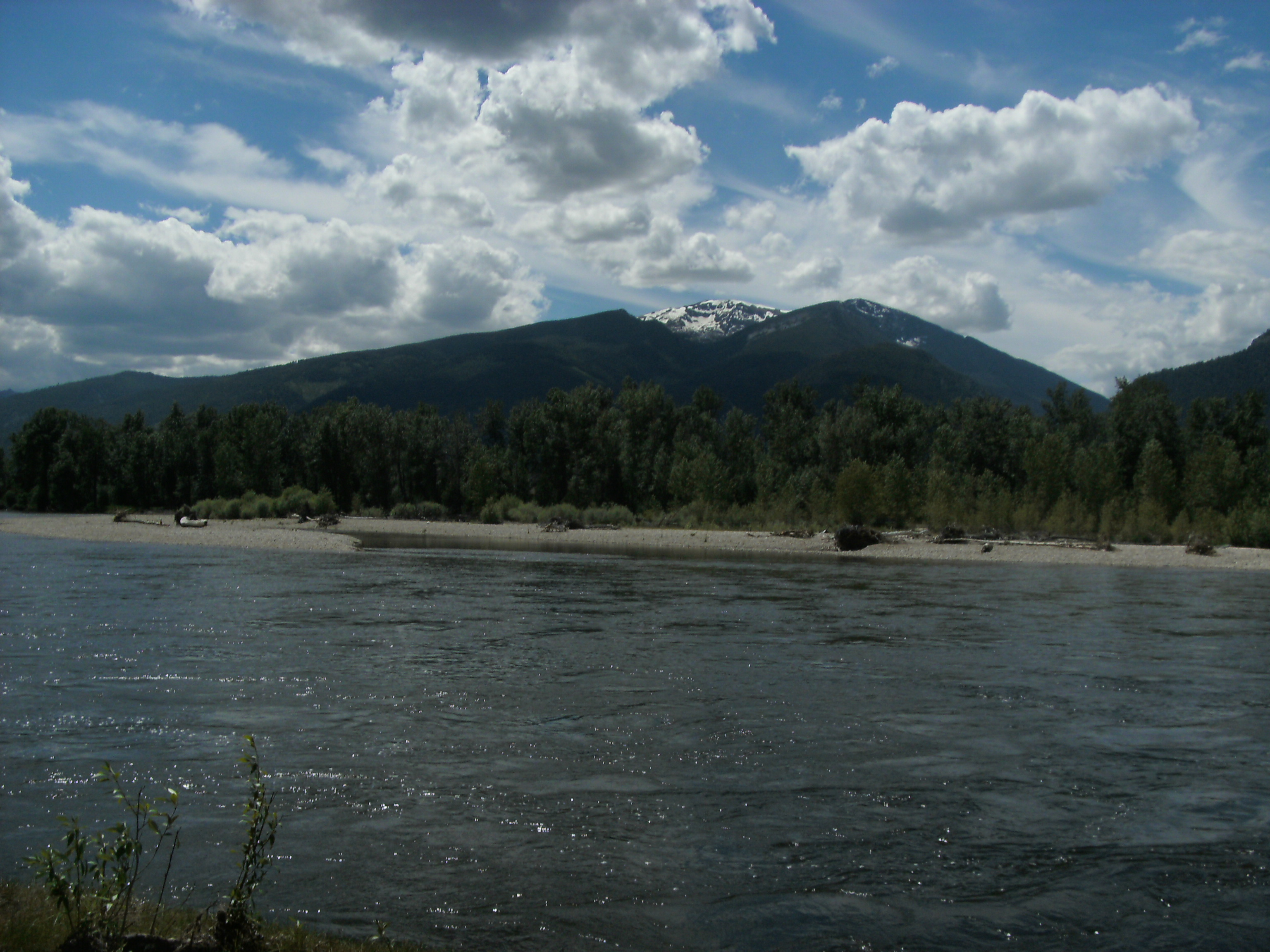
Bitterroot River at Lee Metcalf National Wildlife Refuge

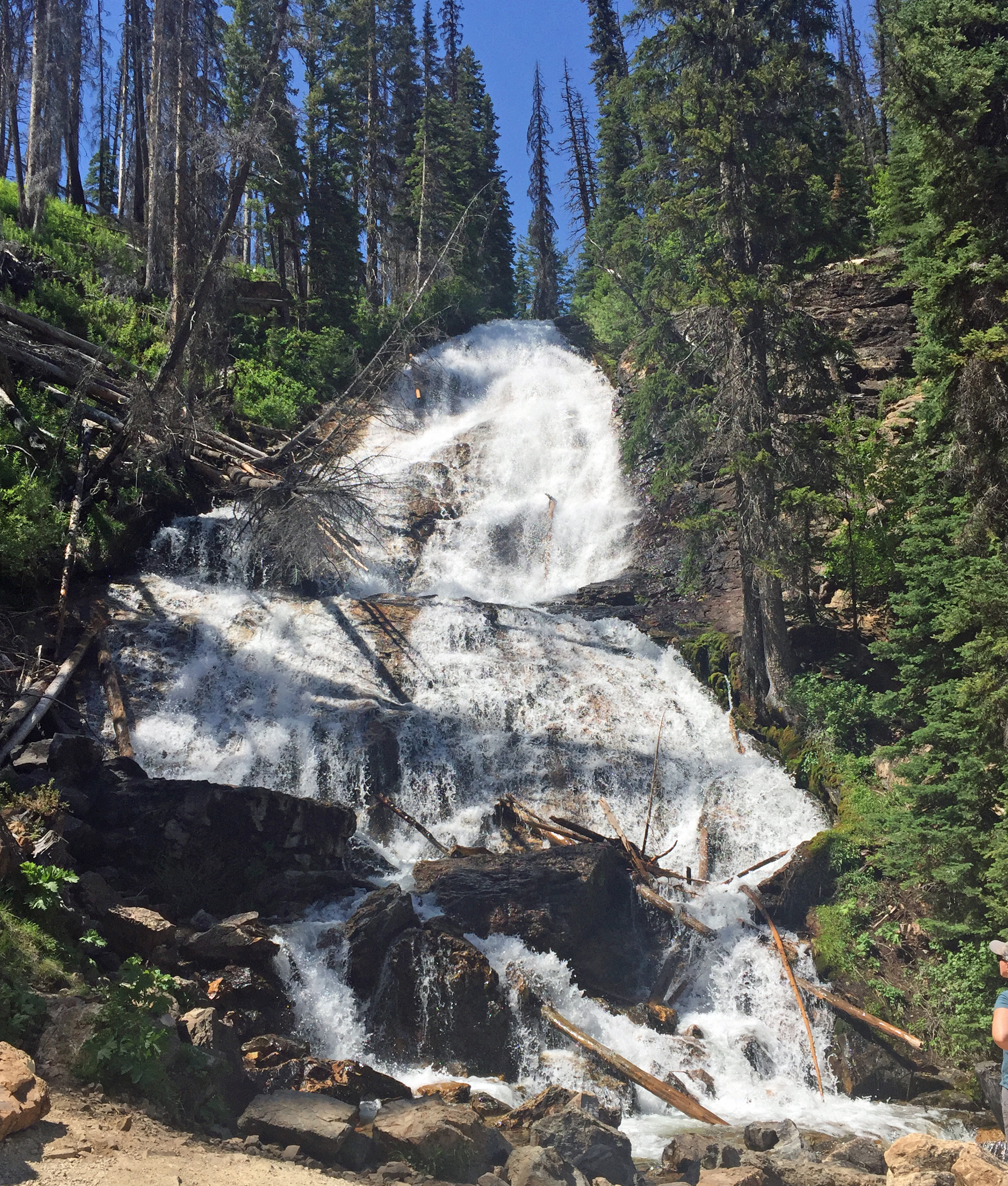
Skalkaho Falls from Montana Highway 38 in the Bitterroot National Forest

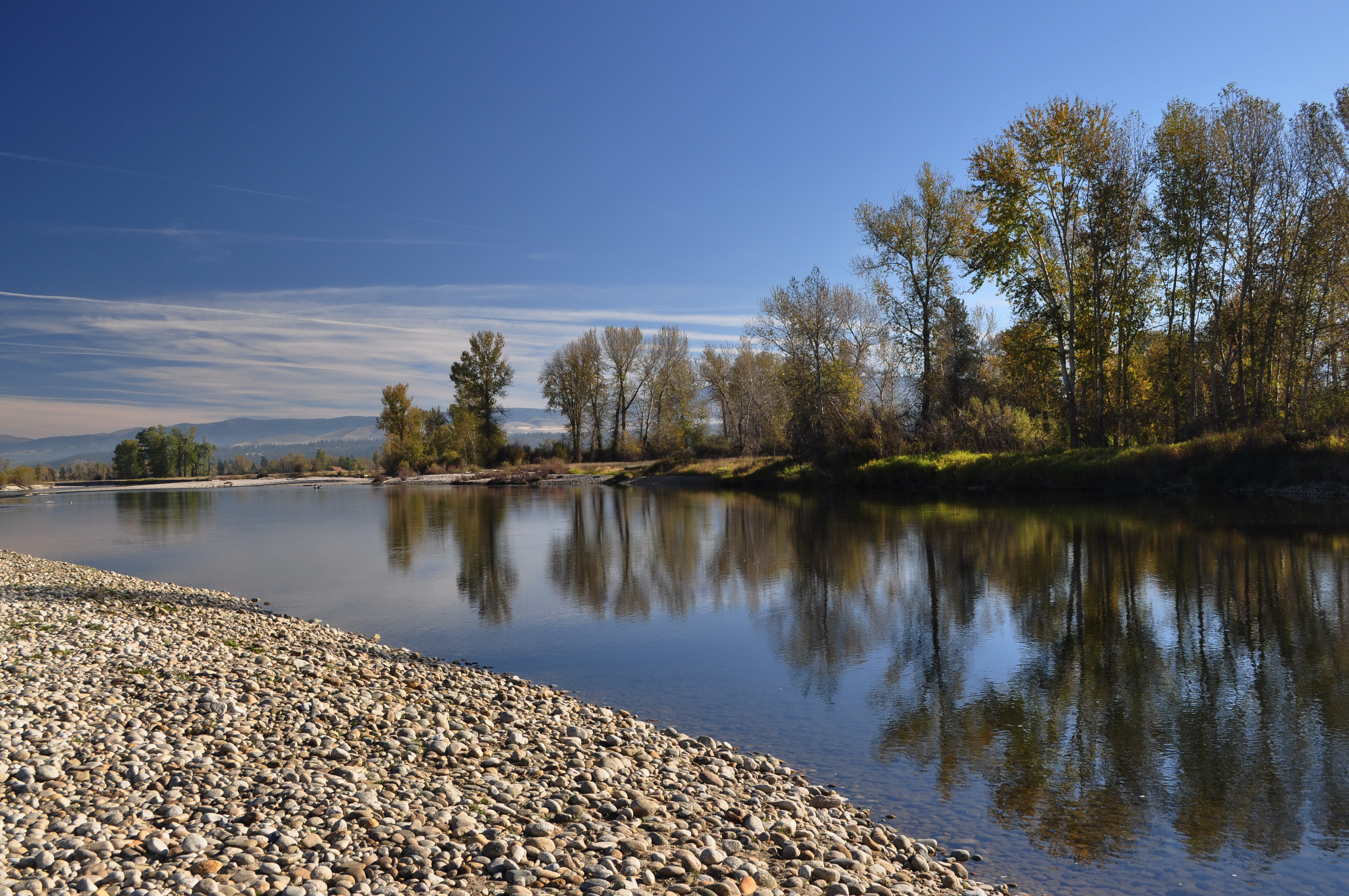
Bitterroot River near Victor, Montana

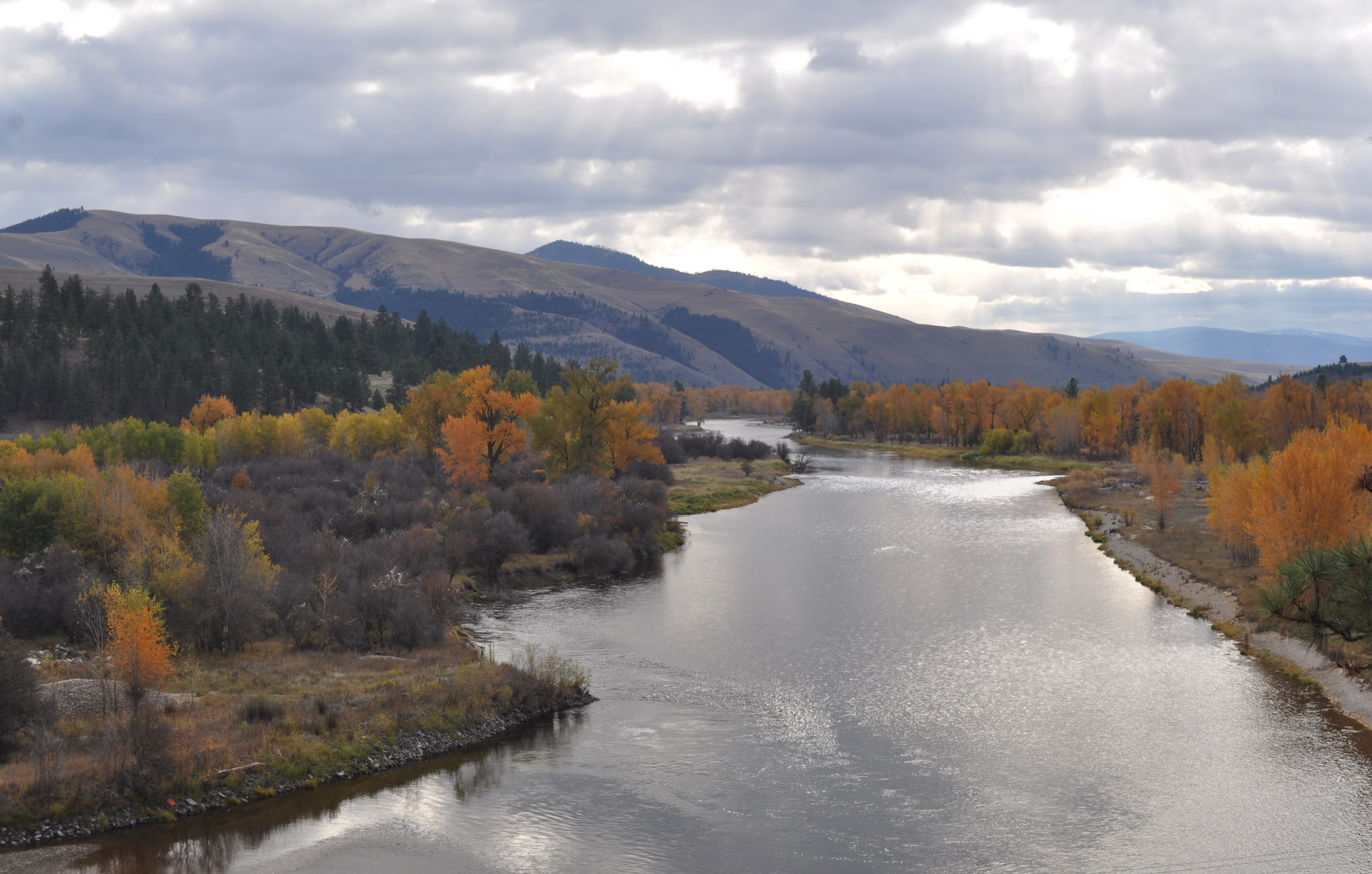
Bitterroot River near Lolo, Montana

== See also ==
- 2000–2001 fires in the Western United States
- Montana Stream Access Law
- List of rivers of Montana
