= Fort Owen State Park =

State park in Montana, USA

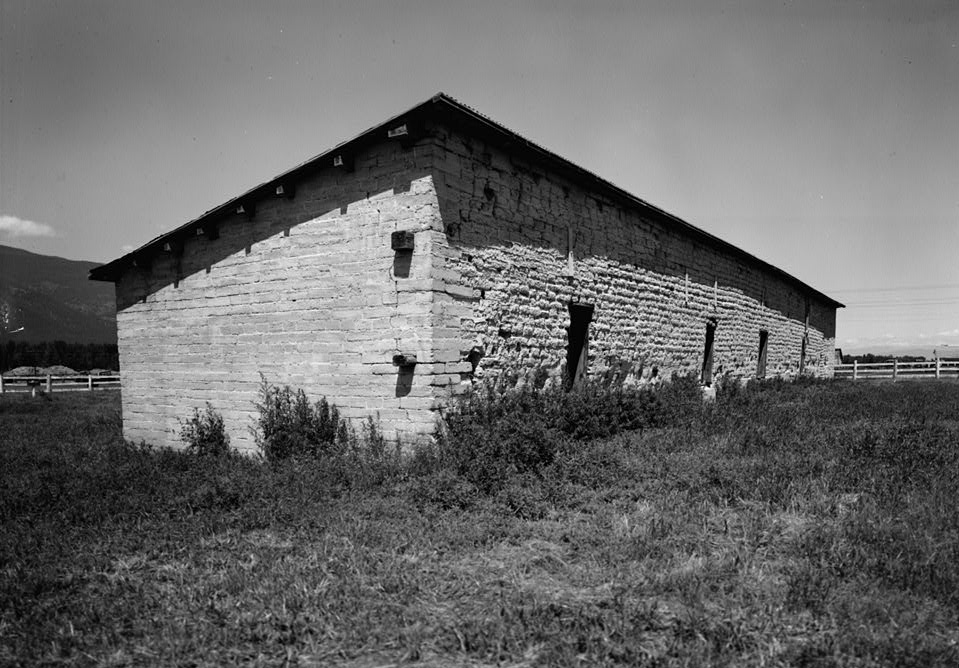
- Barracks at Fort Owen, the only original structure still standing

- Location within Montana
- Location: Stevensville, Montana, United States
- Coordinates: 46°31′10″N 114°5′48″W
- Area: 1 acre (0.40 ha)
- Elevation: 3,291 feet (1,003 m)
- Designation: Montana state park
- Established: 1960
- Visitors: 4,612 (in 2023)
- Administrator: Montana Fish, Wildlife & Parks
- Website: Official website

Fort Owen State Park is a historic preservation area owned by the state of Montana in the United States, located on the northern outskirts of the town of Stevensville, Montana. The park is named for Fort Owen, a mission and later trading post established in 1841 and named for trader John Owen. The park is one acre (0.40 ha) in size, 3,293 feet (1,004 m) in elevation, and is owned and managed by the Montana Department of Fish, Wildlife and Parks. Fort Owen is known as the "cradle of Montana civilization".

== History of Fort Owen ==
=== Original St. Mary's Mission ===
On 24 September 1841, Father Pierre-Jean De Smet entered the Bitterroot Valley of what is now western Montana accompanied by Fathers Nicholas Point and Gregory Mengarini and lay brothers William Claessens, Charles Huet, and Joseph Specht. By fall they erected a small Catholic chapel, St. Mary's Mission, at the site of Fort Owen State Park, which DeSmet used as the base for his missionary work among the Bitterroot Salish tribe of Native Americans. It was the first permanent white settlement in Montana, the first Christian church in Montana, and the first Catholic church in Montana. The wagons and oxen Father DeSmet brought with him were the first ever to enter Montana. By winter, several houses, a trading post, and shops were also constructed. In the spring of 1842, Father DeSmet planted the first oats, potatoes, wheat, and domesticated garden plants, and engaged in which is considered by historians to be the first farming in Montana. In the summer of 1842, cows were brought to St. Mary's Mission from Fort Colvile in the unclaimed territory that would later become Washington state. These were first domesticated cattle ever in Montana. Father Antonio Ravalli joined the mission in 1842. By the end of that year, the priests had erected the first sawmill, first grist mill, and the first school in Montana as well.

For these reasons, St. Mary's and Fort Owen is known as the "cradle of Montana civilization".

=== Fort Owen ===
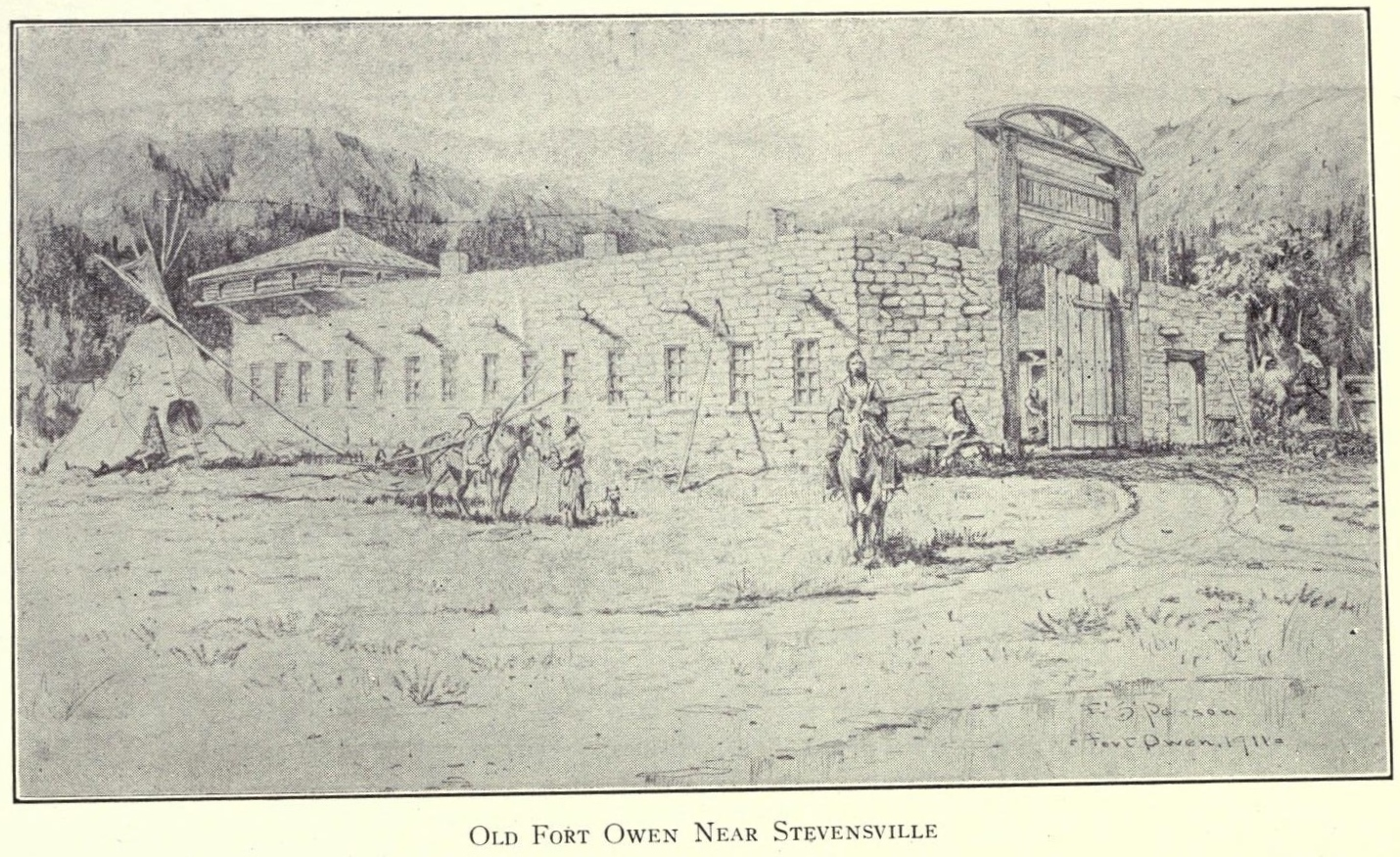
Old Fort Owen near Stevensville, Montana

By 1850, Blackfeet raids led to the closure of the original St. Mary's mission. (Another church, also called St. Mary's Mission, was constructed in 1866 about 0.5 miles (0.80 km) to the south. This structure still stands, and is listed on the National Register of Historic Places.) John Owen, a civilian sutler at Fort Hall in what is now southeastern Idaho, moved to the Bitterroot Valley and purchased the site of St. Mary's Mission for $250 ($9,675 in 2025 dollars). This was the first recorded land transaction in Montana.

Owen renamed the site Fort Owen after himself. Owen and his wife Nancy, a full-blood Shoshone, managed the fort themselves and turned it into a highly popular trading post and rest stop for fur trappers, traders, missionaries, and explorers. The priests left instructions for Owen to burn the chapel if they did not return within two years, and Owen did so. The shifting of the river's course has obscured the site, and the exact site of the original mission has not been identified. Owen discovered gold in the Bitterroot Valley in 1852, which led to a rush of settlement in the area. Owen was appointed an Indian agent for the United States federal government in 1856, serving until 1862, when he resigned over the issue of whites supplying alcohol to the Salish and over the government's failure to keep it its promises to the tribe. For a time, Fort Owen even served as the chief Indian agency for the area. In 1860, Owen significantly upgraded the fort by replacing its wood stockade with adobe brick walls.

Nancy Owen died in 1868, and John Owen's mental health deteriorated afterward. Fort Owen began to deteriorate as hostility from the Piegan Blackfeet and Owen's own mental health issues led far fewer people to visit the facility. When the Mullan Road opened in May 1864, it bypassed Fort Owen in favor or Hell Gate, Montana, in the Missoula Valley to the north, and Fort Owen's financial difficulties worsened.

Fort Owen was sold at a sheriff's auction in 1872 to Washington J. McCormick, to whom Owen owed money. McCormick continued to operate the saw and grist mills at the site. In 1889, he was working to repair the roof of the fort when a powerful wind gust ripped the roof from the structure and flung McCormick to the ground, where he died.

After McCormick's death, Fort Owen was owned by a succession of local farmers and ranchers. Eventually, the decrepit fort was donated the Stevensville Historical Society. The historical society donated what little remained of the fort to the state of Montana in 1937.

=== State park ===
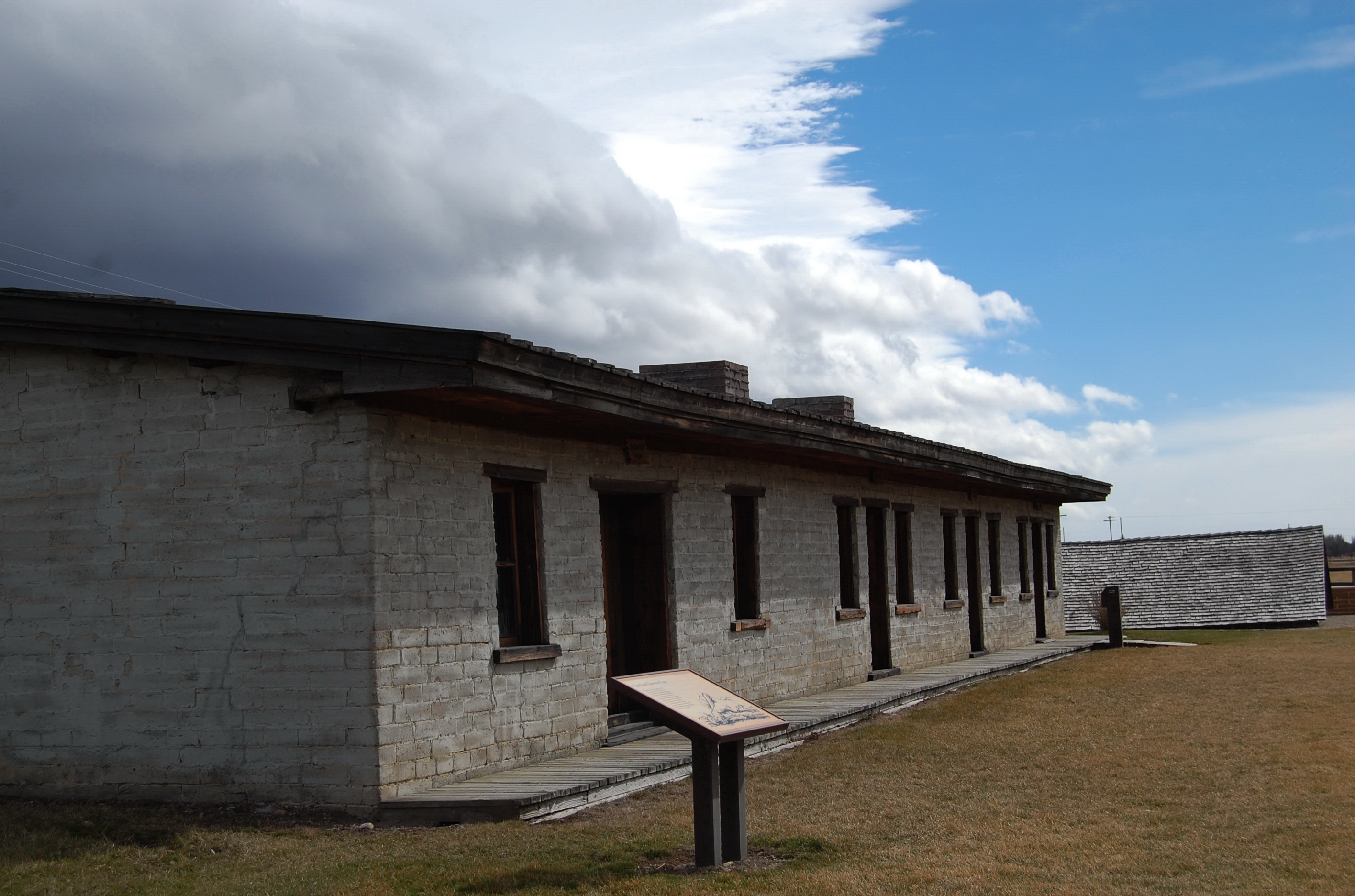
Barracks

Fort Owen is located on the Stevensville Cutoff Road, south of Missoula, Montana, on U.S. Route 93.

Little is left of Fort Owen. The only original structure still standing is the East Barracks. The back wall, a portion of the side walls, and the interior walls are original adobe brick manufactured and erected by Father DeSmet and his associates in 1841 and 1842.

Archeological investigations by the University of Montana from 1957 to 1980 uncovered the fort's foundations, which are visible to visitors. Visitors can also see a reconstructions of an 1850s cabin, a root cellar, and a well house.

Fort Owen State Park is a one-acre (0.40 ha) plot surrounded by private property and is open every day of the year. Volunteers from the Stevensville Historical Society occasionally staff the park to answer questions, but visitors mostly rely on interpretive signage to learn about the mission and the fort and their history.

== Bibliography ==
- Aarstad, Rich; Arguimbau, Ellen; Baumler, Ellen; Porsild, Charlene L.; Shovers, Brian (2009). Montana Place Names From Alzada to Zortman. Helena, Mont.: Montana Historical Society Press. ISBN 9780975919613.
- Baumler, Ellen (Spring 2016). "A Cross in the Wilderness: St. Mary's Mission Celebrates 175 Years". Montana The Magazine of Western History. 66 (1): 18–38. JSTOR 26322905.
- Conklin, David G. (2002). Montana History Weekends: Fifty-Two Adventures in History. Guilford, Conn.: Globe Pequot Press. ISBN 9780762711611.
- Crutchfield, James A. (2008). It Happened in Montana. Guilford, Conn.: TwoDot Press. ISBN 9780762745685.
- Leeson, Michael A. (1885). History of Montana, 1739-1885. Chicago: Warner, Beers & Co.
