= Ravalli County, Montana =

County in Montana, United States

- County
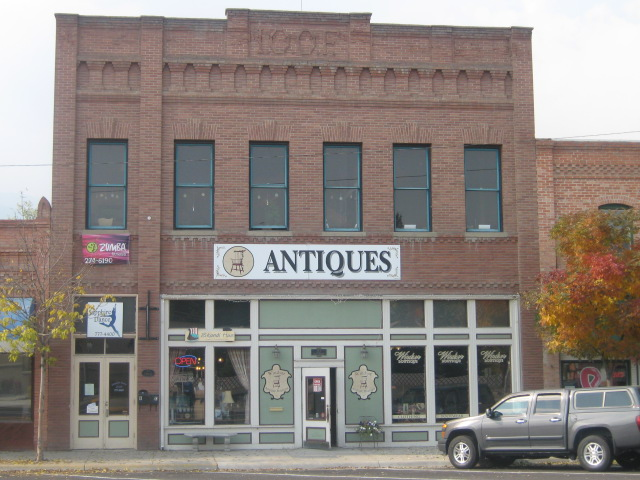
- Independent Order of Odd Fellows Hall in Stevensville, Montana

- Location within the U.S. state of Montana
- Coordinates: 46°05′N 114°07′W
- Country: United States
- State: Montana
- Founded: March 3, 1893
- Named for: Antonio Ravalli
- Seat: Hamilton
- Largest city: Hamilton

Area
  - Total: 2,400 sq mi (6,200 km^{2})
  - Land: 2,391 sq mi (6,190 km^{2})
  - Water: 9.4 sq mi (24 km^{2}) 0.4%

Population (2020)
  - Total: 44,174
  - Estimate (2025): 48,582 ▲
  - Density: 18.48/sq mi (7.133/km^{2})
- Time zone: UTC−7 (Mountain)
  - Summer (DST): UTC−6 (MDT)
- Congressional district: 1st
- Website: ravallicounty.gov
- Montana county number 13

Ravalli County is a county in the southwestern part of the U.S. state of Montana. As of the 2020 census, the population was 44,174. Its county seat is Hamilton.

Ravalli County is part of a north–south mountain valley bordered by the Sapphire Mountains on the East and the Bitterroot Mountains on the West. It is often referred to as the Bitterroot Valley, which is named for the Bitterroot Flower. The county is on the Pacific Ocean side of the Continental Divide, which follows the Idaho-Montana border from Wyoming until Ravalli County. Here, it turns east into Montana, between Chief Joseph Pass and Lost Trail Pass, and follows the Ravalli County-Beaverhead County border.

== History ==
Ravalli County was once home to the Bitterroot Salish tribe. The tribe was first encountered in 1805 by the Lewis and Clark Expedition, which noted their friendly nature. The Catholic Church took an interest in creating a mission in the area, and in 1841 founded St. Mary's Mission, subsequently renamed as Fort Owen. In 1864, the settlement's current name, Stevensville, was adopted. In 1891, the Salish tribe was moved to the current Flathead Reservation under the Treaty of Hellgate.

In 1877, Chief Joseph and his Wallowa band of Nez Perce passed through Ravalli County in their attempt to escape confinement to a reservation; they were captured en route to Canada just south of Havre.

Ravalli County was created in 1893 by the Montana Legislature, carving off a portion of Missoula County. It was named after the Italian Jesuit priest Antony Ravalli, who came to the Bitterroot Valley in 1845.

== Geography ==
According to the United States Census Bureau, the county has an area of 2,400 square miles (6,200 km^{2}), of which 2,391 square miles (6,190 km^{2}) is land and 9.4 square miles (24 km^{2}) (0.4%) is water.

=== Major highways ===
- U.S. Highway 93
- Montana Highway 38

=== Adjacent counties ===
- Missoula County - north
- Granite County - northeast
- Deer Lodge County - east
- Beaverhead County - southeast
- Lemhi County, Idaho - south
- Idaho County, Idaho - west/Pacific Time Border

=== National protected areas ===
- Bitterroot National Forest (part)
- Lee Metcalf National Wildlife Refuge
- Lolo National Forest (part)

== Demographics ==
Historical population
Census	Pop.	Note	%±
1900	7,822		—
1910	11,666		49.1%
1920	10,098		−13.4%
1930	10,315		2.1%
1940	12,478		21.0%
1950	13,101		5.0%
1960	12,341		−5.8%
1970	14,409		16.8%
1980	22,493		56.1%
1990	25,010		11.2%
2000	36,070		44.2%
2010	40,212		11.5%
2020	44,174		9.9%
2025 (est.)	48,582	▲	10.0%
U.S. Decennial Census; 1790–1960, 1900–1990, 1990–2000, 2010–2020

=== 2020 census ===
As of the 2020 census, the county had a population of 44,174. Of the residents, 19.3% were under the age of 18 and 27.9% were 65 years of age or older; the median age was 50.2 years. For every 100 females there were 97.7 males, and for every 100 females age 18 and over there were 95.3 males. 15.6% of residents lived in urban areas and 84.4% lived in rural areas.

The racial makeup of the county was 91.4% White, 0.2% Black or African American, 0.8% American Indian and Alaska Native, 0.6% Asian, 1.2% from some other race, and 5.7% from two or more races. Hispanic or Latino residents of any race comprised 3.6% of the population.

There were 18,750 households in the county, of which 23.2% had children under the age of 18 living with them and 22.6% had a female householder with no spouse or partner present. About 27.5% of all households were made up of individuals and 15.0% had someone living alone who was 65 years of age or older.

There were 21,062 housing units, of which 11.0% were vacant. Among occupied housing units, 76.5% were owner-occupied and 23.5% were renter-occupied. The homeowner vacancy rate was 1.3% and the rental vacancy rate was 4.1%.

=== 2010 census ===
As of the 2010 census, there were 40,212 people, 16,933 households, and 11,380 families in the county. The population density was 16.8 inhabitants per square mile (6.5/km^{2}). There were 19,583 housing units at an average density of 8.2 per square mile (3.2/km^{2}). The racial makeup of the county was 95.9% white, 0.9% American Indian, 0.5% Asian, 0.2% black or African American, 0.1% Pacific islander, 0.6% from other races, and 1.9% from two or more races. Those of Hispanic or Latino origin made up 3.0% of the population. In terms of ancestry, 28.8% were German, 17.4% were English, 15.9% were Irish, 8.3% were American, 5.7% were Italian, and 5.5% were Norwegian.

Of the 16,933 households, 26.5% had children under the age of 18 living with them, 55.5% were married couples living together, 7.7% had a female householder with no husband present, 32.8% were non-families, and 27.1% of all households were made up of individuals. The average household size was 2.35 and the average family size was 2.83. The median age was 46.0 years.

The median income for a household in the county was $43,000 and the median income for a family was $53,004. Males had a median income of $42,065 versus $27,629 for females. The per capita income for the county was $23,908. About 9.6% of families and 15.0% of the population were below the poverty line, including 23.5% of those under age 18 and 6.3% of those age 65 or over.

== Economy ==
Agriculture and timber form the bulk of Ravalli County economic activity. Marcus Daly, one of three Butte copper kings, funded logging operations in the Bitterroot Valley. The lumber was necessary for the Butte copper operation. Recently, more of Ravalli County's economy stems from tourism. The valley borders the Selway-Bitterroot Wilderness and offers a wide variety of wildlife, including some of the few remaining wolverine and wolf populations in the contiguous states. The Lost Trail Powder Mountain ski area is at Lost Trail Pass on the Idaho border on US-93.

== Politics ==
Ravalli County voters have been reliably Republican, opting only one time for the Democratic Party candidate in national elections since 1940 (as of 2024).

United States presidential election results for Ravalli County, Montana
Year	Republican		Democratic		Third party(ies)	
Year	No.	%	No.	%	No.	%
1904	1,083	57.45%	523	27.75%	279	14.80%
1908	1,045	48.09%	859	39.53%	269	12.38%
1912	316	13.39%	858	36.36%	1,186	50.25%
1916	1,623	42.40%	1,967	51.38%	238	6.22%
1920	2,110	60.49%	1,224	35.09%	154	4.42%
1924	1,311	37.79%	562	16.20%	1,596	46.01%
1928	2,551	68.50%	1,112	29.86%	61	1.64%
1932	1,714	39.76%	2,292	53.17%	305	7.07%
1936	1,580	33.39%	2,859	60.42%	293	6.19%
1940	2,483	46.73%	2,773	52.19%	57	1.07%
1944	2,342	54.33%	1,926	44.68%	43	1.00%
1948	2,354	49.84%	2,159	45.71%	210	4.45%
1952	3,537	66.37%	1,750	32.84%	42	0.79%
1956	3,437	61.40%	2,161	38.60%	0	0.00%
1960	3,121	56.46%	2,381	43.07%	26	0.47%
1964	2,350	41.50%	3,300	58.28%	12	0.21%
1968	3,183	53.25%	2,080	34.80%	714	11.95%
1972	4,611	61.83%	2,480	33.25%	367	4.92%
1976	4,894	56.29%	3,504	40.30%	296	3.40%
1980	7,268	63.73%	3,063	26.86%	1,073	9.41%
1984	8,161	67.15%	3,825	31.47%	168	1.38%
1988	7,418	59.39%	4,763	38.13%	309	2.47%
1992	5,392	35.90%	4,644	30.92%	4,983	33.18%
1996	8,138	50.11%	5,200	32.02%	2,902	17.87%
2000	11,241	65.21%	4,451	25.82%	1,546	8.97%
2004	13,279	66.84%	6,144	30.93%	444	2.23%
2008	13,002	58.83%	8,400	38.01%	699	3.16%
2012	14,307	64.41%	7,285	32.80%	620	2.79%
2016	14,810	65.66%	6,223	27.59%	1,523	6.75%
2020	19,114	67.05%	8,763	30.74%	630	2.21%
2024	20,617	68.94%	8,485	28.37%	803	2.69%

== Communities ==
=== City ===
- Hamilton

=== Towns ===
- Darby
- Pinesdale
- Stevensville

=== Census-designated places ===
- Charlos Heights
- Conner
- Corvallis
- Florence
- Sula
- Victor

=== Unincorporated communities ===
- Alta
- Bell Crossing
- Cinnibar Court
- Como
- Gorus
- Grantsdale
- Medicine Hot Springs
- Riverside

== Education ==
K-12 school districts include:

- Corvallis K-12 Schools
- Darby K-12 Schools
- Florence-Carlton K-12 Schools
- Hamilton K-12 Schools
- Victor K-12 Schools

High school districts include:

- Stevensville High School District

Elementary school districts include:

- Lone Rock Elementary School District
- Stevensville Elementary School District

== Notable person ==
- Henry L. Myers, Ravalli County prosecuting attorney, U.S. Senator from Montana

== See also ==
- List of lakes in Ravalli County, Montana
- List of mountains in Ravalli County, Montana
- National Register of Historic Places listings in Ravalli County MT
