= Antonio Ravalli =

Jesuit priest

- Born: 16 May 1812; Ferrara, Italy
- Died: 2 October 1884 (aged 72); Stevensville, Montana
- Other names: Anthony Ravalli
- Education: Roman College
- Church: Catholic
- Ordained: 1843

Antonio Ravalli (b. in Ferrara, Italy, 16 May 1812 - died at St. Mary's, Montana, USA, 2 October 1884), also known as Anthony Ravalli, was an Italian Jesuit missionary, artist, and doctor active in the Pacific Northwest region of the United States. He is known primarily for his contributions to the architecture and art of Jesuit missions in the region. He also inoculated the tribes he served against smallpox, and his efforts shielded the Bitterroot Salish against epidemics that devastated other tribes. In 1893 Ravalli County, Montana was named after him.

== Early life and education ==
Anthony Ravalli was born 16 May 1812 to wealthy parents in Ferrara, Italy. When he was fifteen, Ravalli entered the Society of Jesus. He attended medical school at the Roman College. In 1843, he was ordained a priest, and he responded to Pierre-Jean De Smet's appeal for missionaries to the Native Americans in the Pacific Northwest.

== Career ==
Ravalli traveled with the priests Louis Vercruyesse, Michael Accolti, and John Nobili, Francis Huybrechts, and six sisters of the Congregation of Notre Dame de Namur, arriving at Fort Vancouver, 5 August 1844, after a voyage of eight months. He brought medical supplies, carpentry tools, and two mill stones to stock the Jesuit missions. He spent a few months at the mission of St. Paul on the Willamette River (Champoeg, Oregon), where he studied English and ministered to the sick (being skilled in medicine). In the spring of 1845, he joined Adrian Hoeck at the mission of St. Ignatius among the Kalispel (Pend d'Oreille), on the upper Columbia River in what is now Washington.

In 1845, Ravalli was transferred to St. Mary's Mission on the Bitterroot River in what is now western Montana. On his way there, he stopped at Colville, Washington, where he resuscitated a young Indian woman who had tried to hang herself. From then on, he had a reputation as a healer wherever he went. Upon his arrival at St. Mary's Mission, Ravalli inoculated the Bitterroot Salish people against smallpox. When he used up all the pharmaceuticals he had brought from Italy, he learned remedies from the Indians and made his own medicines. He built a grist mill and sawmill at the mission.

When Blackfeet raids forced St. Mary's Mission to close in 1850, Ravalli continued his work at other missions. In 1854, he assumed charge of the Sacred Heart Mission established by Nicholas Point among the Coeur d'Alenes (Skitswish) of Northern Idaho. He designed and supervised the building of a church. With its altar and beautiful statues, carved by himself, it was described by a traveler as "a credit to any civilized country." Isaac Stevens, Governor of Washington Territory, who saw it in 1855, said in his official report: "The church was designed by the superior of the mission, Father Ravalli, a man of skill as an architect and, undoubtedly, judging from his well-thumbed books, of various accomplishments." During the Yakima War from 1855 to 1857, Ravalli influenced the northern tribes to remain neutral.

In 1866, Ravalli and Joseph Giorda, superior of the Rocky Mountain missions, reestablished St. Mary's Mission in the Bitterroot Valley. Ravalli designed the interior of the chapel, which was dedicated 28 October 1866. To decorate the chapel, Ravalli carved statues of Mary and Ignatius of Loyola. He made whatever tools he needed with his own hands, including his paintbrushes, which he made with tail hair from his favorite cat. He made his house into a sort of pharmacy where he dispensed medicines, and his skill as a doctor made the mission a regional medical center for Indians and whites alike. He traveled a two-hundred-mile radius in all weather to minister to the sick. Near the end of his life, a stroke left him partially paralyzed, but he still visited the sick in a wagon fitted with a cot. He died at St. Mary's Mission on 2 October 1884 and is buried in the cemetery there.

Fifty years a Jesuit and forty years a missionary, one of the noblest men that ever laboured in the ranks of the Church in Montana, his fame stands very high in Montana, where a later generation knows more of him than even of Father de Smet. (Chittenden).

== Legacy ==
In the state of Montana, Ravalli County and the community of Ravalli in Lake County are named for him. In 2005, Ravalli was inducted into the Gallery of Outstanding Montanans at the state capitol in Helena.

== See also ==
- Cataldo Mission, which he designed
- St. Mary's Mission, which he designed
- History of Idaho
- Stevensville, Montana
- History of Montana
