= Charlo (Native American leader) =

Head chief of the Bitterroot Salish

- Sɫm̓xẹ Q̓woxq̣eys
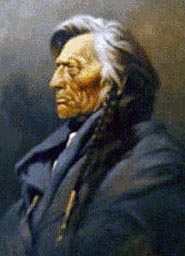
- Chief Charlot, oil on canvas, 1910, painted by Edgar S. Paxson

Bitterroot Salish leader
- Preceded by: Victor or Xweɫxƛ̣ ̓cín (Many Horses or Plenty-of-Horses)

Personal details
- Born: c. 1830
- Died: January 10, 1910
- Spouse: Margaret
- Children: Martin, Ann Felix, and Victor
- Parent: Chief Victor (Many Horses or Plenty-of-Horses)
- Nickname: (Claw of the Little Grizzly or Small Grizzly-Bear Claw)

Charlo (also Charlot; Sɫm̓xẹ Q̓woxq̣eys [Claw of the Little Grizzly or Small Grizzly-Bear Claw]) (c. 1830 – 1910) was head chief of the Bitterroot Salish from 1870 to 1910. Charlo followed a policy of peace with the American settlers in Southwestern Montana and with the soldiers at nearby Fort Missoula.

After the extermination of the buffalo herds, Charlo struggled for twenty years to maintain his people's economic independence in their homeland, the Bitterroot Valley. When Charlo's people were finally forced to remove to the Flathead Indian Reservation by the U.S. federal government, Charlo negotiated with retired general Henry B. Carrington to secure good farms and assistance for the Bitterroot Salish. Charlo spent the rest of his life attempting to hold the U.S. government accountable to fulfill its promises and defending his people's rights to reservation land against white efforts to open the reservation for homesteading.

== Early life ==
Charlo was born sometime around 1830, before any permanent white settlement existed in what is now Montana. His father was Victor (Xweɫxƛ̣ ̓cín, Many Horses or Plenty-of-Horses). Charlo grew up in the Bitterroot Valley, his people's ancestral home, where every landscape had a Coyote story, tribal event, or family story linked to it. Charlo's people practiced a seasonal round, traveling once or twice a year to the plains to hunt buffalo. During Charlo's childhood, the Bitterroot Salish were recovering from a population decline caused by smallpox and by wars fueled by the westward movement of Plains tribes that had driven the Salish off of the Great Plains in previous generations.

In 1841, Jesuit priests opened St. Mary's Mission in the Bitterroot Valley, and it became a religious and social center for the tribe. It also became Montana's first permanent white settlement. So, as Charlo came of age, his people were caught in a diplomatic dance to build alliances with tribes to the west, to defend their ancestral buffalo hunting rights in the face of pressure from Plains tribes, and to maintain peace with the growing population of whites.

Charlo married a woman named Margaret, and they had three children: Martin, Ann Felix, and Victor.

=== Hellgate Treaty ===
In 1855, the Hellgate treaty was signed, and it became a major force that influenced Charlo's path. This treaty between the Salish, Pend d'Oreilles, and Kootenais and the U.S. government provided for the Flathead Indian Reservation in the lower Flathead River Valley and a provisional second reservation in the Bitterroot Valley. The treaty called for a survey of the Bitterroot Valley, after which the president would decide which valley would be "better adapted to the wants of the Flathead tribe." The treaty also promised to keep the Bitterroot Valley closed to white settlement until the survey had been completed.

The treaty effectively weakened the Salish tribe's legal claim to the Bitterroot Valley. Father Adrian Hoecken, S.J., watched the council proceedings and thought that the treaty was a farce, writing, "What a ridiculous tragi-comedy the whole council proved. It would take too long to write it all down—ah well! Not a tenth of it was actually understood by either party, for Ben Kyser [the translator] speaks Flathead very badly and is no better at translating into English." Congress failed to ratify the treaty until 1859, leaving the Salish in limbo. When the treaty was finally ratified, the government bungled nearly every provision. Most notably, the government never fully surveyed the valley as promised, and, distracted by the Civil War, let languish the question of whether to create a reservation in the Bitterroot Valley. It also failed to keep white settlers out of the Bitterroot as had been promised.

== Chief ==
Charlo was appointed chief in August 1870 upon the death of his father, Victor. Charlo continued Victor's policy of peace, but he also continued to defend his people's claim to the Bitterroot Valley against the claims of white settlers.

In 1871, President Ulysses S. Grant issued an executive order to remove the Salish from the valley. When Congressman James A. Garfield arrived to carry out the order in 1872, the conflict over land claims nearly escalated into a military clash. The diplomacy of Charlo and other Salish leaders calmed the situation. Garfield negotiated an agreement through which part of the tribe moved to the Flathead Reservation. The rest of the people could remain in the Bitterroot if they became "land-holding U.S. citizens." In the face of military threat, Charlo refused to sign the agreement. To secure a signature, government officials recognized Arlee as chief. Charlo's signature was forged on the published version of the agreement, and Arlee led part of the tribe to the Flathead Reservation in 1873. Charlo still refused to leave, and he never forgave or spoke to Arlee again. Most of the Salish people remained with Charlo in the Bitterroot, and some received "permanently inalienable" patents to farms in the valley. They continued to consider themselves an independent tribal community, although the government viewed them as U.S. citizens who had severed tribal relations.

A speech printed in 1876 by Montana newspapers expressed the devastation and betrayal felt by Charlo towards the white settlers and the U.S. military and government representatives. In part it read:

"Since our forefathers first beheld (Lewis and Clark), more than seven times ten winters have snowed and melted ... We were happy when (the white men) first came. We first thought he came from the light, but he comes like the dusk of the evening now, not like the dawn of the morning. He comes like a day that has passed, and night enters our future with him ...

In his poverty we fed, we cherished him — yes, befriended him and showed him the fords and defiles of our lands.

(But) he has filled graves with our bones ... His course is destruction; he spoils what the spirit who gave us this country made beautiful and clean. ...

His laws never gave us a blade, nor a tree, nor a duck, nor a grouse, nor a trout. ...

How often does he come? You know he comes as long as he lives, and takes more and more, and dirties what he leaves.."

— Charlot

== Removal to the Flathead ==
Charlo successfully defended his people's claim to the Bitterroot Valley as long as they could hunt buffalo east of the Continental Divide. The destruction of the buffalo herds in the 1870s and 1880s devastated the Salish economy and forced them to expand their farms and herds. An unprecedented drought in 1889 brought the people almost to starvation. As the tribe's situation grew desperate, Charlo began to consider the U.S. government's offer of land on the Flathead Reservation. At the same time, Congress passed a bill allowing for the sale of Salish land in the Bitterroot, with the proceeds to be paid to the Salish owners in cash or spent by the government on their behalf. The people would then be removed to the Flathead Reservation.

=== Negotiation ===
In October 1889, retired general Henry B. Carrington arrived in Montana to negotiate with Charlo and convince him to sign an agreement that would allow the sale of his allotment in the Bitterroot. Charlo's signature would express the willingness of Bitterroot Salish to leave their ancestral homeland and move to the Flathead. Carrington worked to gain Charlo's trust, visiting him at his farm before the negotiations began and giving him gifts of cigars and food supplies. When the negotiations finally began in Stevensville, Montana, Carrington brought out the original 1872 Garfield agreement to corroborate Charlo's claim that he never signed it. In spite of Carrington's efforts to gain his trust, Charlo at first refused to remove to the Flathead. According to Carrington's account, Charlo "declared that 'he never would sign [the agreement], but kill himself first.'" Charlo brought up the government's broken promises regarding the Hellgate treaty and asked for the "literal execution" of that treaty, but Carrington did not respond to his request. Charlo emphasized that he and the Bitterroot Salish had remained friendly to the whites in spite of all their broken promises. Carrington argued that Charlo needed to remove to the Flathead to stop the young Salish men from gambling, drinking, brawling, and stealing. Charlo promised to think all night about Carrington's offer. Later that day, a group of young Salish men got drunk and started a brawl. Charlo had to break it up, and he whipped the offenders.

The next day was Sunday, November 3. Charlo attended Mass, and afterward he went to Carrington's headquarters in Stevensville. There, he made a "full statement of the poverty and wretchedness of the Flatheads of the valley, especially naming several very aged men and women who could not help themselves and whom the young men would not help. He said that 'the young men would hunt and sell their game for fire-water, and he could not stop it,' that 'they followed the words of bad white men and stole what they wanted to eat, without working for it.'" After this speech, Charlo signed the agreement, saying, "The Great Spirit said to me last night, 'Trust the white Chief.' Charlot loves his people! Charlot will change and do right! Charlot will sign the paper, and then, the white chief can write down what Charlot wants." In exchange for Charlo's agreement to remove to the Flathead Reservation, Carrington made promises: the Salish would receive food assistance until the move, their burial places near St. Mary's Mission would be protected, the people would receive good cabins on the Flathead Reservation on parcels of their choosing, every family with children would receive a cow, and Charlo would receive new wagons and Arlee's farm.

=== Removal ===
Carrington promised Charlo that he would return in the spring to arrange for the land sales and for the move, but Congress failed to provide funds for the move until July 1, 1891. Charlo and his people, counting on Carrington's promise that the move would take place in 1890, did not plant crops on their farms in the Bitterroot that spring. Even if they had wanted to, the drought of 1889 had left them so impoverished that they could not afford seed, and in spite of its promise of assistance, the government failed to provide more than starvation rations. By the winter of 1890, Charlo's people were forced to barter away their horses, harnesses, plows, and even stoves in order to feed themselves. When Carrington finally returned and met with Charlo on July 29, 1891, Charlo insisted that he would "talk no business, until [the] people are fed."

Sales of Salish land in the Bitterroot took longer than Carrington had promised, and after holding a council on October 11, 1891, the Salish decided to go ahead with the move even though their farms remained unsold. Charlo gave the news to Carrington that afternoon:

I could not sleep at first, last night. I remember my father Victor and that his people expected me to do what he would approve, for their good. I told everybody to come together in the morning as soon as the sun was up to say prayers to the Great Spirit. That made me feel better, and I could go to sleep. Then, the Great Spirit gave me these thoughts. "Charlot, go with your people. They will starve, or freeze here. Nobody will buy your land if you stay. Go and pick out good land and build houses before winter. Shut your ears to lies which bad people tell you." So I come, to say, we will all go, and go together. We don't want any soldiers with us, or any other whitemen except White Chief [Carrington] and Joe McLaren.

Charlo organized the march himself and insisted that it take place without a white military escort. However, Salish oral histories indicate that troops were present during the removal. On October 15, 1891, Charlo called the people to gather. After praying, they announced that they would go. Charlo did not look back. Elders later remembered the journey as a funeral march. It took three days to travel the sixty miles to the Jocko Agency where agent Peter Ronan welcomed the people with a feast. After a twenty-year struggle, Charlo had ensured his people's survival, but it came at the cost of their independence.

== Reservation life ==
After his arrival at the Flathead Indian Reservation, Charlo spent much of his time seeking fulfillment of the unfounded promises made by Carrington. Charlo had been promised the farm of Arlee, but Arlee had willed it to his granddaughter. In its place, Charlo accepted the Jocko Agency farm. The Salish had been promised assistance with fencing and plowing their new farms, and each family with children had been promised a cow. But although agent Peter Ronan requested funds to fulfill these promises, they were never granted. Charlo also expected that his people would receive rations until they received the money from the sale of their land in the Bitterroot. But when Ronan ran out of beef for the rations, the government delayed to provide more. Charlo felt betrayed by the broken promises. According to Ronan, "I have no complaint to make against Chief Charlot—he is a just and agreeable man, but is a believer in the fulfillment of promises."

An article about Charlo appeared in the Anaconda Standard in 1896. It described his attitude, "Charlot feels that he and his people were deeply injured by these officials [government negotiators] and has never forgiven the white race for this injury. It is doubtless true that some of the promises made by General Carrington at the time the transfer was made have never been fulfilled, and the grouty old chief has some reason for his hostility."

In 1904, Montana's Congressman Joseph M. Dixon sponsored a bill to open the Flathead Reservation to homesteading. Charlo fought against the opening of the reservation until his death in 1910.

== Death and legacy ==
Charlo died on January 10, 1910. His son Victor became chief in his place. The town of Charlo, Montana, and Chief Charlo Elementary School, in Missoula, Montana, are named after him.
