= Gregorio Mengarini =

Jesuit priest

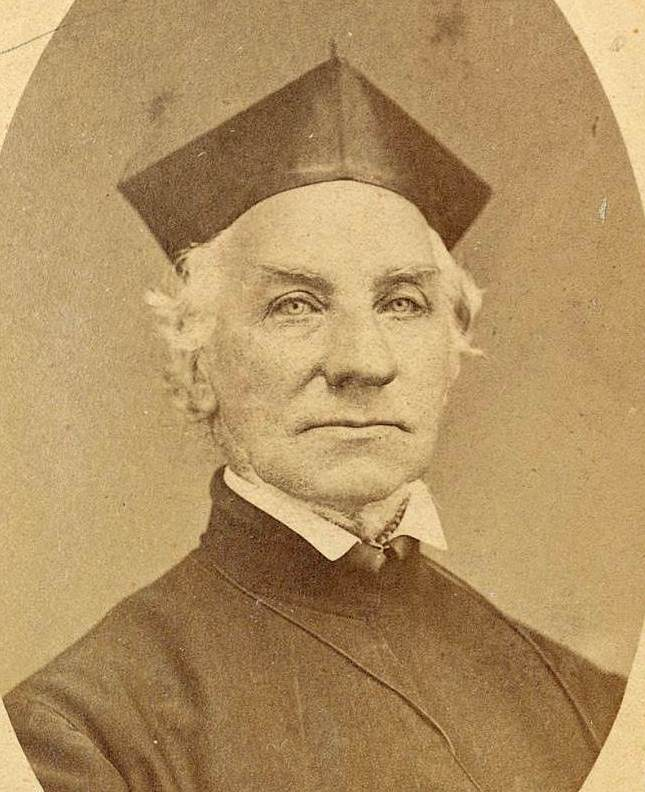
- c. 1875-79
- Born: 21 July 1811; Rome
- Died: 23 September 1886 (aged 75); Santa Clara, California
- Other names: Gregory Mengarini
- Education: Roman College
- Church: Catholic
- Ordained: March 1840
- Writings: A Dictionary of the Kalispel or Flat-head Indian Language

Gregorio or Gregory Mengarini (21 July 1811 – 23 September 1886) was an Italian Jesuit priest and missionary and linguist. He worked as a pioneer missionary in the northwest of the United States to the Flathead Nation, and became the philologist of their languages.

== Life ==
Born in Rome, he entered the Jesuit novitiate in 1828, and later served as instructor in grammar, for which his philological bent particularly fitted him, at Rome, Modena and Reggio Emilia. While studying at the Collegio Romano in 1839, a letter of Joseph Rosati, Bishop of St. Louis, voicing the appeal of the Flatheads for missionary priests, was read out in the refectory, during the meal, and Mengarini felt moved to volunteer for the work.

Ordained priest in March 1840, he sailed with Cotling, another volunteer, from Livorno on 23 July, and after a nine weeks' voyage landed at Philadelphia. From Baltimore the missionaries found their way to the University of Georgetown, District of Columbia, and a little later to St. Louis, where it was decided Cotling should remain.

Mengarini was chosen to help found St. Mary's Mission among the Bitterroot Salish, partly on account of his voice and knowledge of music – valued in Indian mission work. On 24 April 1841, Pierre-Jean De Smet, Mengarini, and Nicolas Point, with the lay brothers Specht, Huett, and Classens, and nine other companions, began the long journey by river and overland trail to Fort Hall, Idaho, then a trading post, where they arrived on the feast of the Assumption (15 August) and found a party of Flatheads waiting to conduct them to their final destination. It was nearly a month later when they arrived at what is now Stevensville, Montana, in the Bitterroot Valley, and began the foundations of the log mission.

The missionaries worked at cutting the frozen earth with axes. The church and house were of logs plastered between with clay, and were thatched with weeds, the rooms being partitioned with curtains of deerskin and thin scraped deerskin being used in lieu of glass for the windows. The winter cold was so intense that the buffalo skin robes in which they wrapped themselves at night were frozen stiff and had to be thawed out each morning.

The missionaries began the study of the language, translating into it simple prayers and hymns. Mengarini's method for learning the language consisted of immersing himself in it as fully as possible. He even joined the tribe on a summer buffalo hunt. Mengarini composed a Salish grammar that is still the standard for the cognate dialects. He wrote it in Latin and designed it for use by future generations of missionaries. He taught the children to sing in Salish hymns of his own composition, and even trained an Indian band for service on feast days. He organized Sunday afternoon "catechism bees," public contests in which children took turns asking and answering questions. The winner received arrows as a prize. Having studied homeopathic medicine, Mengarini also treated illnesses that plagued the Salish. He believed that the Salish would continue to practice their traditional medicine, which he considered idolatrous, "if they are not convinced that the missionaries are much more practitioners of medicine than they."

However, when Mengarini and the other priests reached out to the Blackfeet, traditional Salish enemies, they broke the trust of the Salish people. Mengarini instructed one Salish man to give back items taken from an enemy Blackfeet in battle. Another time, he invited Blackfeet to a feast at St. Mary's Mission. By offering friendship to the Blackfeet, the priests inadvertently destroyed the trust the Salish tribe placed in them, causing tensions to rise and undermine their efforts. The missionary work progressed until 1849, when raids by the Blackfeet and the defection and relapse of a large part of the Flathead tribe under a rival claimant for the chieftainship forced the mission to close.

Mengarini was summoned to join Michael Accolti, the superior of the northwestern Jesuit Missions, in Oregon. In 1852, on request of Joseph Sadoc Alemany, the Archbishop of San Francisco, for Jesuit workers, he was sent to Santa Clara to help establish the Californian mission that was the nucleus of the present college.

In the meantime the Flatheads had sent to Oregon to ask for his return. They were told this was impossible as he was assigned to another station, but on their urgent desire, the Flathead mission was re-established at St. Ignatius in 1851. Mengarini was stationed at Santa Clara for the rest of his life, acting for thirty years as treasurer or vice-president, until a stroke of apoplexy and failing sight caused his retirement from active duties.

A third stroke of apoplexy ended his life in September 1886.

== Contribution to philology ==
Mengarini's principal contribution to philology is his Selish or Flathead Grammar: Grammatica linguæ Selicæ – published by the Cromoisy Press (New York, 1861) from the third manuscript copy, the first two, laboriously written out by him, having been lost. Originally intended solely for the use of the missionaries, it was written in Latin, and he himself always said the first draft was the most correct.

He also furnished vocabularies of the cognate Salishan languages – of Shw oyelpi (Colville), S'chitzui (Coeur d'Alene) and Salish proper (Flathead) in John Wesley Powell's Contributions to North American Ethnology, I (Washington, 1877), and of the Santa Clara dialect of California in Stephen Powers's Tribes of California, volume III of the same series, published in the same year. He contributed some linguistic notes in the Journal of the Anthropological Institute of New York, I (1871–72).

His personal memoir, The Rocky Mountains, published in the Woodstock Letters for 1888, was dictated a few months before his death.

== Bibliography ==
- Gerald McKevitt: Gregorio Mengarini (1811–1886); North American Missionary and Linguist, in Archivum Historicum Societatis Iesu, vol.61 Fac. 122 (1992), p. 171-188.
