= Arastra Creek =

Arastra Creek may refer to:

- Arastra Creek (Alaska), in Juneau, Alaska
- Arastra Creek (California), in Siskiyou County, California
- Arastra Creek (Montana), in Ravalli County, Montana
