= Riverside, Montana =

Unincorporated community in Montana, U.S.

Coordinates: 46°16′29″N 114°9′29″W

Riverside is an unincorporated community in Ravalli County, Montana, United States. It sits at an elevation of 3,517 feet.

A post office operated in Riverside for a short time: it was established on January 16, 1889 and closed on May 28, 1895. The community once possessed a railroad station, which is no longer in existence; at various times, it was known as Riverside, Haggin, or River Siding.
