= Nicholas Point =

Jesuit priest

Fr. Nicholas Point
- Born: 10 April 1799; Rocroi Ardennes, French First Republic
- Died: 3 July 1868 (aged 69); Quebec, Canada
- Education: Jesuit college at St. Acheul
- Church: Catholic
- Ordained: 20 March 1831
- Writings: Recollections of the Rocky Mountains

Nicholas Point; (10 April 1799 – 4 July 1868), was a French Catholic priest, artist, and member of the Society of Jesus (Jesuits). He is known primarily for the drawings and watercolors he created during his missionary work in the mid-19th century among the Native American peoples in the northwestern United States.

== Early life ==
Nicholas Point was born 10 April 1799 in Rocroi, France, to François and Marie-Nicole Point. The French Revolution caused instability in Point's childhood, and his education was unconventional. Although the revolutionary government suppressed Catholicism, Point's devout mother sent him to a school in the home of a local curate. When Point was thirteen, his father's death forced him to take work at a lawyer's office. After reading a biography about Francis Xavier, Point entered the order of the Society of Jesus on 28 June 1819 and was ordained a priest on 20 March 1831.

== Missionary career ==
In 1835, Point sailed to America. He arrived at St. Mary's College in Kentucky in June 1836. In 1837, he founded St. Charles College in Grand Coteau, Louisiana. He served as the college's first rector until 1840.

Point was chosen by his superiors to join an expedition to found a mission among the Bitterroot Salish people in what is now Montana. In June 1840 he joined Pierre-Jean De Smet, Gregorio Mengarini, and three Jesuit lay brothers in Westport, Missouri to prepare for the overland journey. The group departed from Westport 10 May 1841 traveling with the Bartleson–Bidwell Party. They arrived in the Bitterroot Valley 24 September 1841 and built a church. Point designed the settlement, St. Mary's Mission, after the pattern of Jesuit missions in Paraguay. With houses fifty feet apart and lawns sixty feet square, the design failed to take into account Salish concerns for defense against enemy attacks. Although St. Mary's Mission prospered at first, tensions soon rose between the priests and Salish. Many Salish people were baptized and adopted some aspects of Catholicism, but they had no wish to practice agriculture as the priests urged them to do. When the priests began to discuss founding a mission for the Blackfeet, traditional enemies of the Salish, it created a breach of trust.

Point traveled extensively among the Plateau tribes in the Pacific Northwest. In 1842, he helped establish the Mission of the Sacred Heart along the Saint Joe River in present-day Idaho for the Nez Perce and Coeur d'Alene people. In 1846, he traveled among the Blackfeet, although he did not establish a mission. During his time as a missionary, Point kept a sketchbook and made hundreds of drawings of the missions and the people they served. Although Point's skill was limited by his lack of formal art training, his work is considered valuable by historians and anthropologists because it offers one of the earliest visual records of Pacific Northwest tribes.

== Later years and death ==
In 1847, Point left the Pacific Northwest region and traveled to the Jesuit mission at Sandwich in the Province of Canada, where his brother Pierre was the prior. In 1848 Point became the prior of the Holy Cross mission on Manitoulin Island. He designed the church there. In 1855, his health deteriorated, and he was recalled to the Jesuit house in Sault-au-Récollet. He spent his last years organizing his writings and artworks into a memoir, Recollections of the Rocky Mountains. In 1865, his superiors sent him to Quebec. He died there on 3 July 1868, and was buried in the crypt of the Cathedral-Basilica of Notre-Dame de Québec.
