= Charlos Heights, Montana =

- Census-designated place
- Location within Montana
- Coordinates: 46°07′44″N 114°10′52″W
- Country: United States
- State: Montana
- County: Ravalli

Area
  - Total: 1.21 sq mi (3.13 km^{2})
  - Land: 1.19 sq mi (3.07 km^{2})
  - Water: 0.023 sq mi (0.06 km^{2})
- Elevation: 3,744 ft (1,141 m)

Population (2020)
  - Total: 135
  - Density: 114.0/sq mi (44.01/km^{2})
- Time zone: UTC-7 (Mountain (MST))
  - Summer (DST): UTC-6 (MDT)
- ZIP code: 59840
- Area code: 406
- FIPS code: 30-13975
- GNIS feature ID: 2583797

Charlos Heights or Charlo's Heights (Salish: nkʷalíʔps) is a census-designated place (CDP) in Ravalli County, Montana, United States. As of the 2020 census, Charlos Heights had a population of 135.

== Geography ==
Charlos Heights is located along U.S. Route 93 in the valley of the Bitterroot River. It is 9 miles (14 km) south of Hamilton and 8 miles (13 km) north of Darby.

According to the United States Census Bureau, the CDP has a total area of 1.2 square miles (3.0 km^{2}), all land.

The area south of Charlos Heights is called ɫmq̓ʷcn̓é in Salish.

== Demographics ==
Historical population
Census	Pop.	Note	%±
2020	135		—
U.S. Decennial Census

== Education ==
Darby K-12 Schools is the area school district.
