= IOOF Hall (Stevensville, Montana) =

- U.S. National Register of Historic Places
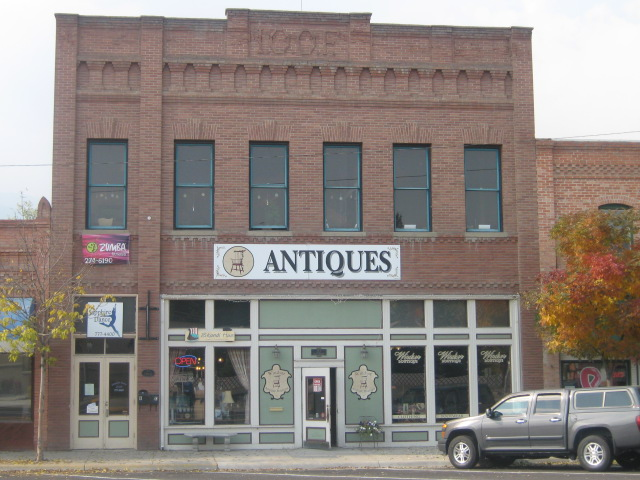

- Location within Montana Location within the United States
- Location: 217-219 Main St., Stevensville, Montana
- Coordinates: 46°30′37″N 114°5′35″W
- Area: less than one acre
- Built: 1912
- Built by: J.J. Hightower
- Architectural style: Vernacular 2-bay commercial
- MPS: Stevensville MPS
- NRHP reference No.: 91000747
- Added to NRHP: June 19, 1991

The IOOF Hall in Stevensville, Montana, also known as the Stevensville Historical Society Museum, was built starting in 1912. It is a vernacular architecture building. It was listed on the National Register of Historic Places in 1991.

Frank Grant, writing in its National Register nomination, states:

The I.O.O.F. Hall, built ca. 1912, is a fine example of the typical Main Street lodge hall found in many rural communities. Built during a period of optimism and growth in Stevensville, the building suggests that members assumed the lodge would continue to play the significant role in community life that it had played during the frontier era.

The building later served as town hall, library, and firehouse for Stevensville.

It was built where the former Wells Building had stood, until destroyed in the 1905 fire in downtown Stevensville.

The Stevensville Historical Museum is now located at 517 Main Street, Stevensville.
