= Hellgate Treaty =

1855 treaty between the United States and Bitterroot Salish

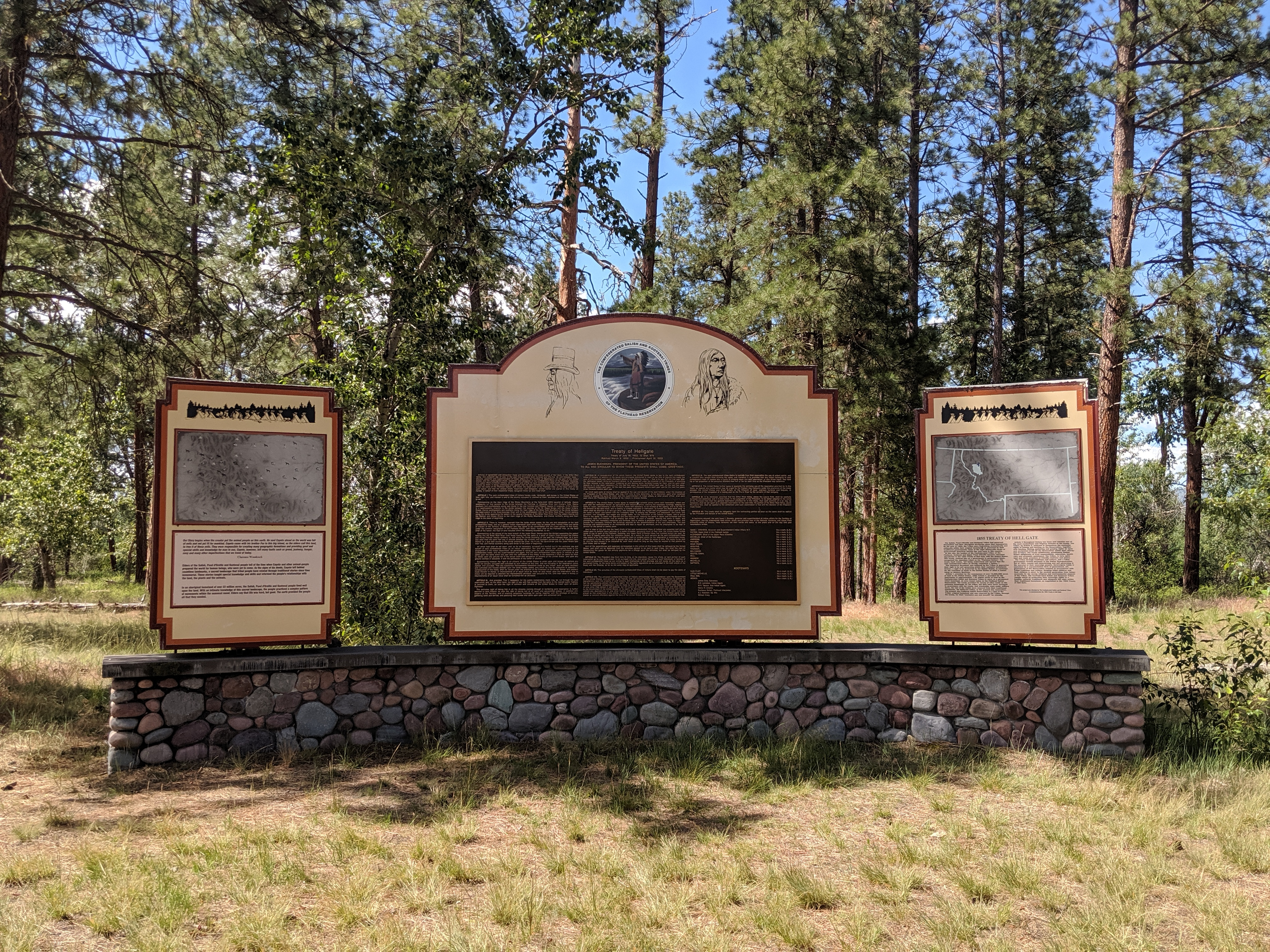
Treaty of Hellgate Monument at Council Grove State Park

The Treaty of Hellgate was a treaty agreement between the United States and the Bitterroot Salish, Upper Pend d'Oreille, and Lower Kutenai tribes. The treaty was signed at Hellgate on 16 July 1855. Signatories included Isaac Stevens, superintendent of Indian affairs and governor of Washington Territory; Victor, chief of the Bitterroot Salish; Alexander, chief of the Pend d'Oreilles; Michelle, chief of the Kutenais; and several subchiefs. The treaty was ratified by Congress, signed by President James Buchanan, and proclaimed on 18 April 1859. It established the Flathead Indian Reservation.

== Context ==
The economy of the Salish, Pend d'Oreille, and Kutenai tribes was based on a seasonal round with annual journeys across the continental divide to hunt bison. These hunts meant dangerous travel into enemy Blackfeet territory, and Blackfeet attacks ravaged the hunting parties, leaving casualties in their wake. The Salish wanted intertribal peace and the right to hunt bison on the plains without being attacked. As white fur traders and trappers moved into the Rocky Mountains in what is now Montana, the Salish, Pend d'Oreilles, and Kutenais made informal alliances with them against enemy Blackfeet and other Plains tribes. They were pleased at Stevens's invitation to the treaty council and expected to talk about intertribal peace. Stevens had little interest in intertribal peace, however. His goal was to convince the tribes to cede their lands and move to a reservation with the intent to clear land for a transcontinental railroad to access the Pacific Ocean and, from there, the markets of Asia. The Treaty of Hellgate was one of ten treaties Stevens oversaw.

== Negotiations ==
On 7 July 1855, the tribes met with Stevens at Council Grove near present-day Missoula, Montana. When the council began, leaders of the tribes wanted to discuss peace, and they urged Stevens to stop whites from trading ammunition to the Blackfeet. Pend d'Oreille leader Nqelʔe ('Big Canoe') wondered why the tribes needed a treaty with the whites: "Talk about treaty, where did I kill you? when did you kill me? What is the reason we are talking about treaties; that is what I said, we are friends, you are not my enemy." Ignoring these concerns, Stevens pushed the tribes to cede their lands in exchange for annuities. His plans were frustrated when the tribes could not agree on a location for the reservation. Salish head chief X͏ʷeɫx̣ƛ̓cín ('Many Horses', known in English as Chief Victor) insisted that his people would not leave their homeland in the Bitterroot Valley. When Stevens lashed out, calling Victor "an old woman" and "dumb as a dog," Victor walked out of the council.

Negotiations resumed a few days later, and Stevens made a compromise. He inserted Article 11 into the treaty, providing for a survey of the Bitterroot Valley. According to the terms, the president would use the survey to decide which reservation would be "better adapted to the wants of the Flathead tribe." In the meantime, the treaty guaranteed that "no portion of the Bitter Root Valley above the Loo-lo Fork, shall be opened to settlement until such examination is had and the decision of the President made known." Believing this compromise would protect his people's claim to the Bitterroot, Victor signed the treaty along with the other chiefs on 16 July 1855.

Translation problems clouded the negotiations, and it is impossible to know how much either side understood about the proceedings. Although Stevens trusted the main translator, Benjamin Kizer, others doubted his abilities. A Jesuit observer, Father Adrian Hoecken, said the translations were so poor that "not a tenth of what was said was understood by either side, for Ben Kizer speaks Flathead very badly and is no better at translating into English." He called the whole council "a ridiculous tragi-comedy." Historians have argued that poor translation created misunderstandings on the part of tribal leaders about what the treaty would mean for their people.

Based on the terms of the accord, the Native Americans were to relinquish their territories to the United States government in exchange for payment installments that totaled US$120,000. The territories in question included everything from the main ridge of the Rocky Mountains at the 49th parallel to the Kootenai River and Clark Fork to the divide between the St. Regis River and the Coeur d'Alene River. From there, the ceded territories also extend to the southwestern fork of the Bitterroot River and up to Salmon River and Snake River. The Flathead Indian Reservation was established by the treaty. Flathead Lake lies in the northeast corner of the reservation, with most of the reservation to the south and west of the lake.

== After the treaty ==
Congress moved slowly, and the treaty was not ratified until March 8, 1859. The resulting delay in annuity payments led the tribes to believe that the government had broken its promise. When the government finally did begin paying annuities—in the form of supplies like blankets, flannel, rice, and coffee—graft and incompetence drained away much of the money. Furthermore, Stevens had made a verbal promise of military protection from the Blackfeet, but this promise was not included in the final treaty. From the perspective of the Salish, Kutenai, and Pend d'Oreille people, it seemed like another broken promise.

The Upper Pend d'Oreille and Lower Kutenai tribes moved to the Flathead Indian Reservation, but the Salish continued to live in the Bitterroot Valley, believing that the treaty had guaranteed their right to do so. In violation of the treaty, white settlement in the valley accelerated during the 1870s and 1880s, putting pressure on the tribe. No thorough survey was ever carried out in keeping with the terms of Article 11. Instead, Stevens sent Flathead Indian agent R. H. Lansdale to ride through the Bitterroot and Flathead valleys and evaluate them. Stevens instructed, "Weight must be given to the fact that a large majority of the Indians prefer the Flathead River reservation." Lansdale obeyed Stevens's orders, giving the verdict that the Flathead reservation would be preferable.

The Civil War distracted the government from deciding the question of the Bitterroot reservation until 1871, when President Ulysses S. Grant issued an executive order to remove the Salish to the Flathead reservation. The diplomacy of Chief Charlo allowed the tribe to remain in the Bitterroot until 1891, when economic pressure finally forced them to move to the Flathead.

The 1904 Flathead allotment act was a major contributor to the loss of a little over million acres. Congress passed the act causing the loss of 60% of the reservation.

== See also ==
- Confederated Salish and Kootenai Tribes of the Flathead Nation
- Treaty of Fort Laramie (1851)
