= Stevensville, Montana =

- Town
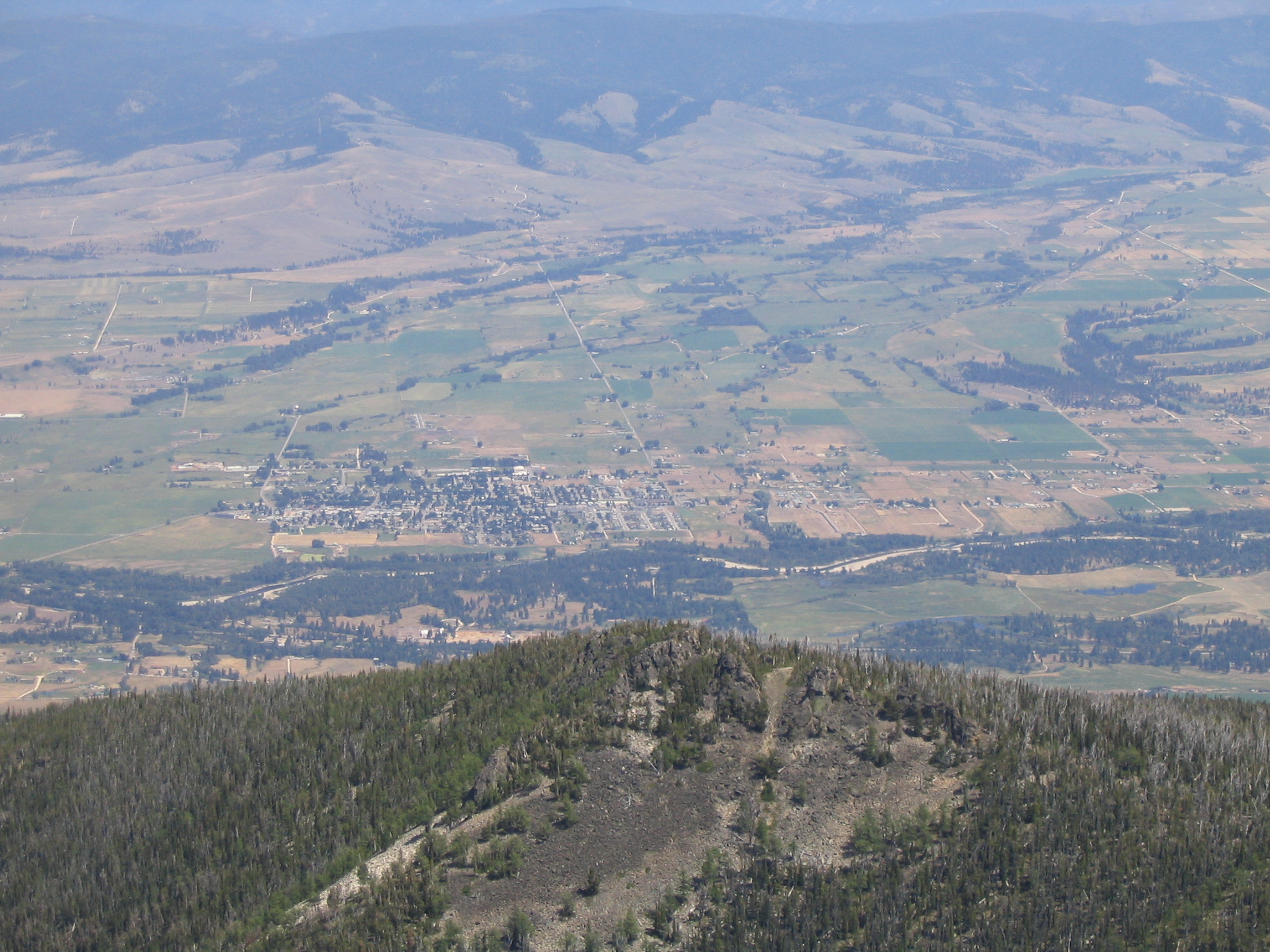
- Stevensville and the Bitterroot River seen from Saint Mary's Peak (2005)

- Location of Stevensville, Montana
- Coordinates: 46°30′17″N 114°05′06″W
- Country: United States
- State: Montana
- County: Ravalli

Government
  - Type: Mayor-Council
  - Mayor: Steve Gibson
  - Body: Stevensville Town Council

Area
  - Total: 1.31 sq mi (3.40 km^{2})
  - Land: 1.29 sq mi (3.35 km^{2})
  - Water: 0.019 sq mi (0.05 km^{2})
- Elevation: 3,320 ft (1,010 m)

Population (2020)
  - Total: 2,002
  - Density: 1,546/sq mi (596.9/km^{2})
- Time zone: UTC-7 (Mountain (MST))
  - Summer (DST): UTC-6 (MDT)
- ZIP code: 59870
- Area code: 406
- FIPS code: 30-71200
- GNIS feature ID: 2413335
- Website: www.townofstevensville.com

Stevensville is a town in Ravalli County, Montana, United States. The population was 2,002 at the 2020 census.

Stevensville is officially recognized as the first permanent settlement of non-indigenous peoples in the state of Montana. Forty-eight years before Montana became the nation's 41st state, Stevensville was settled by Jesuit Missionaries at the request of the Bitterroot Salish tribe.

== History ==
The Bitterroot Valley is the ancestral homeland of the Bitterroot Salish people. Between 1812 and 1821, the Salish learned about the "powerful medicine" of Christianity and Jesuit missionaries from Iroquois fur traders. In 1831, Salish men were dispatched to St. Louis, Missouri, to request "Black Robes" for the tribe. The remaining Salish men secured a visit with St. Louis Bishop Joseph Rosati, who assured them that missionaries would be sent to the Bitterroot Valley when funds and missionaries were available in the future.

Again in 1835 and 1837 the Bitterroot Salish dispatched men to St. Louis to request missionaries, but to no avail. Finally in 1839 a group of Iroquois and Salish met Father Pierre-Jean De Smet in Council Bluffs. The meeting resulted in DeSmet promising to fulfill their request for a missionary the following year.

In 1841, DeSmet led a group of Jesuits to the Bitterroot and founded St. Mary's Mission. It became the first permanent white settlement in what is now Montana. Construction of a chapel began immediately, followed by other permanent structures including log cabins. The settlement was the site of many of Montana's "firsts": irrigation, agriculture, ranching, and cattle branding. Father Ravalli, Jesuit priest and physician, arrived at the mission in 1845 and built the first pharmacy.

In 1850 Major John Owen arrived in the valley and set up camp north of St. Mary's. When Blackfeet raids forced the closure of the mission, Owen bought it from the Jesuits and established a trading post called Fort Owen. The Jesuits later returned to the area and built a new church. Both St. Mary's Mission and Fort Owen still have permanent structures that stand in present-day Stevensville, denoting its historical past starting in 1841.

The name of the settlement was changed from St. Mary's to Stevensville in 1864 to honor territorial governor Isaac Stevens. In 1879, G. A. Kellogg platted the townsite. In 1891, the Bitterroot Salish who remained in the valley were forced to remove to the Flathead Indian Reservation. In 1893, Ravalli County was created, and Stevensville became the county seat until 1898, when the town lost the election to Hamilton. More than forty properties in Stevensville are listed on the National Register of Historic Places.

== Geography ==
According to the United States Census Bureau, the town has a total area of 1.00 square mile (2.59 km^{2}), of which 0.98 square miles (2.54 km^{2}) is land and 0.02 square miles (0.05 km^{2}) is water.

"Flanked by the Bitterroot and Sapphire mountains, the small, historic town in the Bitterroot Valley offers beautiful views, outdoor recreation, and watchable wildlife." The Bitterroot Mountain Range, just west of Stevensville, is the longest single mountain range in the Rocky Mountains. The Bitterroot River runs along the eastern border.

=== Climate ===
This climatic region is typified by large seasonal temperature differences, with warm to hot (rarely humid) summers and cold (sometimes severely cold) winters. According to the Köppen Climate Classification system, Stevensville has a humid continental climate, abbreviated "Dfb" on climate maps.

Climate data for Stevensville, Montana (1991–2020 normals, extremes 1911–present)
Month	Jan	Feb	Mar	Apr	May	Jun	Jul	Aug	Sep	Oct	Nov	Dec	Year
Record high °F (°C)	63 (17)	70 (21)	80 (27)	88 (31)	98 (37)	104 (40)	107 (42)	104 (40)	98 (37)	87 (31)	74 (23)	65 (18)	107 (42)
Mean daily maximum °F (°C)	34.6 (1.4)	38.3 (3.5)	49.6 (9.8)	58.0 (14.4)	67.5 (19.7)	74.8 (23.8)	85.3 (29.6)	83.9 (28.8)	73.6 (23.1)	58.0 (14.4)	42.5 (5.8)	33.1 (0.6)	58.3 (14.6)
Daily mean °F (°C)	26.8 (−2.9)	29.8 (−1.2)	38.0 (3.3)	45.0 (7.2)	53.2 (11.8)	60.1 (15.6)	67.1 (19.5)	65.6 (18.7)	57.0 (13.9)	45.0 (7.2)	33.5 (0.8)	26.0 (−3.3)	45.6 (7.6)
Mean daily minimum °F (°C)	18.9 (−7.3)	21.2 (−6.0)	26.3 (−3.2)	32.0 (0.0)	38.9 (3.8)	45.4 (7.4)	49.0 (9.4)	47.2 (8.4)	40.4 (4.7)	32.1 (0.1)	24.5 (−4.2)	18.9 (−7.3)	32.9 (0.5)
Record low °F (°C)	−36 (−38)	−37 (−38)	−19 (−28)	2 (−17)	15 (−9)	27 (−3)	30 (−1)	27 (−3)	7 (−14)	−3 (−19)	−28 (−33)	−36 (−38)	−37 (−38)
Average precipitation inches (mm)	1.00 (25)	0.92 (23)	0.77 (20)	0.93 (24)	1.45 (37)	1.59 (40)	0.83 (21)	0.81 (21)	0.84 (21)	1.04 (26)	1.15 (29)	1.12 (28)	12.45 (316)
Average snowfall inches (cm)	4.0 (10)	3.0 (7.6)	1.5 (3.8)	0.1 (0.25)	0.0 (0.0)	0.0 (0.0)	0.0 (0.0)	0.0 (0.0)	0.0 (0.0)	0.1 (0.25)	1.6 (4.1)	6.8 (17)	17.1 (43)
Average precipitation days (≥ 0.01 in)	9.4	7.6	9.5	8.7	10.0	10.1	5.5	6.0	6.5	8.5	9.0	9.3	100.1
Average snowy days (≥ 0.1 in)	3.2	1.7	0.9	0.2	0.0	0.0	0.0	0.0	0.0	0.2	0.9	2.3	9.4
Source: NOAA

== Demographics ==
Historical population
Census	Pop.	Note	%±
1880	47		—
1900	346		—
1910	796		130.1%
1920	744		−6.5%
1930	692		−7.0%
1940	703		1.6%
1950	772		9.8%
1960	784		1.6%
1970	829		5.7%
1980	1,207		45.6%
1990	1,221		1.2%
2000	1,553		27.2%
2010	1,809		16.5%
2020	2,002		10.7%
U.S. Decennial Census

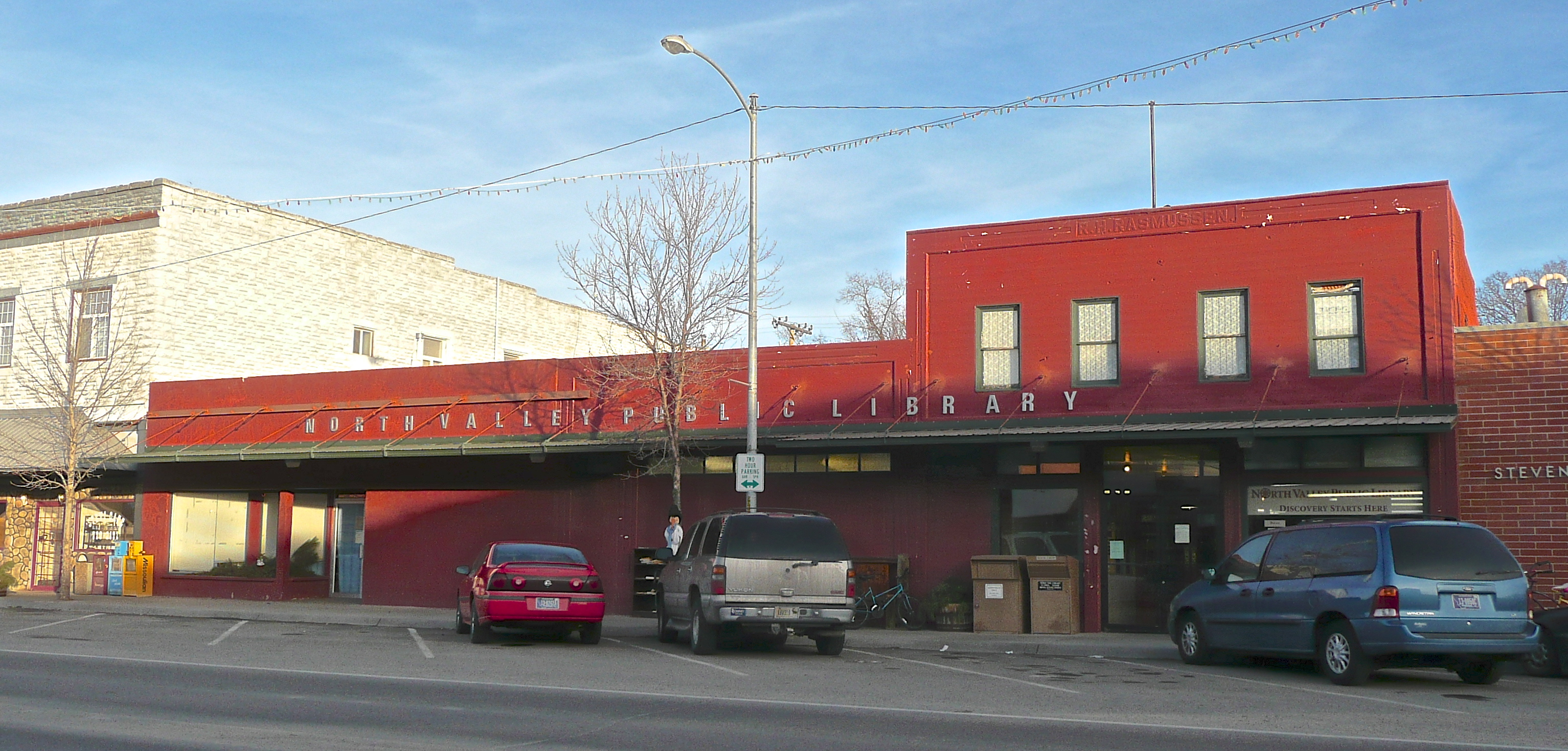
North Valley Public Library, Stevensville, Montana

=== 2020 census ===
As of the 2020 census, Stevensville had a population of 2,002. The median age was 44.4 years. 20.6% of residents were under the age of 18 and 25.7% of residents were 65 years of age or older. For every 100 females there were 87.8 males, and for every 100 females age 18 and over there were 84.5 males age 18 and over.

0.0% of residents lived in urban areas, while 100.0% lived in rural areas.

There were 881 households in Stevensville, of which 28.3% had children under the age of 18 living in them. Of all households, 40.3% were married-couple households, 19.8% were households with a male householder and no spouse or partner present, and 33.0% were households with a female householder and no spouse or partner present. About 35.4% of all households were made up of individuals and 19.4% had someone living alone who was 65 years of age or older.

There were 939 housing units, of which 6.2% were vacant. The homeowner vacancy rate was 1.1% and the rental vacancy rate was 2.2%.

Racial composition as of the 2020 census
Race	Number	Percent
White	1,843	92.1%
Black or African American	4	0.2%
American Indian and Alaska Native	12	0.6%
Asian	4	0.2%
Native Hawaiian and Other Pacific Islander	1	0.0%
Some other race	7	0.3%
Two or more races	131	6.5%
Hispanic or Latino (of any race)	96	4.8%

=== 2010 census ===
As of the census of 2010, there were 1,809 people, 836 households, and 455 families living in the town. The population density was 1,845.9 inhabitants per square mile (712.7/km^{2}). There were 935 housing units at an average density of 954.1 units per square mile (368.4 units/km^{2}). The racial makeup of the town was 96.0% White, 0.1% African American, 1.0% Native American, 0.4% Asian, 0.6% from other races, and 2.0% from two or more races. Hispanic or Latino of any race were 3.4% of the population.

There were 836 households, of which 24.9% had children under the age of 18 living with them, 40.8% were married couples living together, 8.4% had a female householder with no husband present, 5.3% had a male householder with no wife present, and 45.6% were non-families. 40.2% of all households were made up of individuals, and 19.5% had someone living alone who was 65 years of age or older. The average household size was 2.11 and the average family size was 2.87.

The median age in the town was 42.3 years. 22.2% of residents were under the age of 18; 7.3% were between the ages of 18 and 24; 23.8% were from 25 to 44; 25.1% were from 45 to 64; and 21.7% were 65 years of age or older. The gender makeup of the town was 46.9% male and 53.1% female.

=== 2000 census ===
As of the census of 2000, there were 1,553 people, 652 households, and 385 families living in the town. The population density was 3,008.3 inhabitants per square mile (1,161.5/km^{2}). There were 711 housing units at an average density of 1,377.3 units per square mile (531.8 units/km^{2}). The racial makeup of the town was 96.52% White, 0.26% African American, 1.03% Native American, 0.26% Asian, 0.32% from other races, and 1.61% from two or more races. Hispanic or Latino of any race were 2.00% of the population.

There were 652 households, out of which 29.4% had children under the age of 18 living with them, 46.0% were married couples living together, 10.7% had a female householder with no husband present, and 40.8% were non-families. 35.6% of all households were made up of individuals, and 16.0% had someone living alone who was 65 years of age or older. The average household size was 2.27 and the average family size was 2.93.

In the town, the population was spread out, with 25.3% under the age of 18, 9.0% from 18 to 24, 24.9% from 25 to 44, 20.1% from 45 to 64, and 20.8% who were 65 years of age or older. The median age was 39 years. For every 100 females there were 89.9 males. For every 100 females age 18 and over, there were 85.0 males.

The median income for a household in the town was $27,951, and the median income for a family was $34,583. Males had a median income of $29,327 versus $20,729 for females. The per capita income for the town was $14,700. About 10.4% of families and 12.8% of the population were below the poverty line, including 13.3% of those under age 18 and 9.7% of those age 65 or over.

== Education ==
Stevensville Public Schools educates students from kindergarten through 12th grade. Stevensville High School had 383 students enrolled in the 2021–2022 school year. Their team name is the Yellowjackets.

North Valley Public Library is located in Stevensville.

== Media ==
The Bitterroot Star is a weekly newspaper.

The FM radio station KKVU is licensed in Stevensville.

== Infrastructure ==
Stevensville is accessed from U.S. Route 93 by Montana Highway 269. Montana Highway 203 exits town on the northeast.

Stevensville Municipal Airport is a town-owned public-use airport located two miles (3.2 km) northeast of town. The nearest commercial airport is Missoula Montana Airport, 32 miles (51 km) north.

== Notable people ==
- Janine Benyus, author
- Tyler Bradt, whitewater kayaker, ran Palouse Falls in 2009
- Edward Catich, author was born in the town
- Huey Lewis, lead singer of Huey Lewis and the News
- Marion Marshall, actress
- Washington J. McCormick, United States Representative from Montana, retired to Stevensville
- George McGovern owned a book store and a summer home in the area
- Lee Metcalf, United States congressman (1953–1961) and senator (1961–1978) from Montana
- Kathleen Meyer, author
- Greg Overstreet, lawyer and politician
- Anthony Ravalli, Jesuit pioneer and founder of western U.S. settlements
