= St. Mary's Mission (Montana) =

Historic church in Montana, United States

- St. Mary's Church and Pharmacy
- U.S. National Register of Historic Places
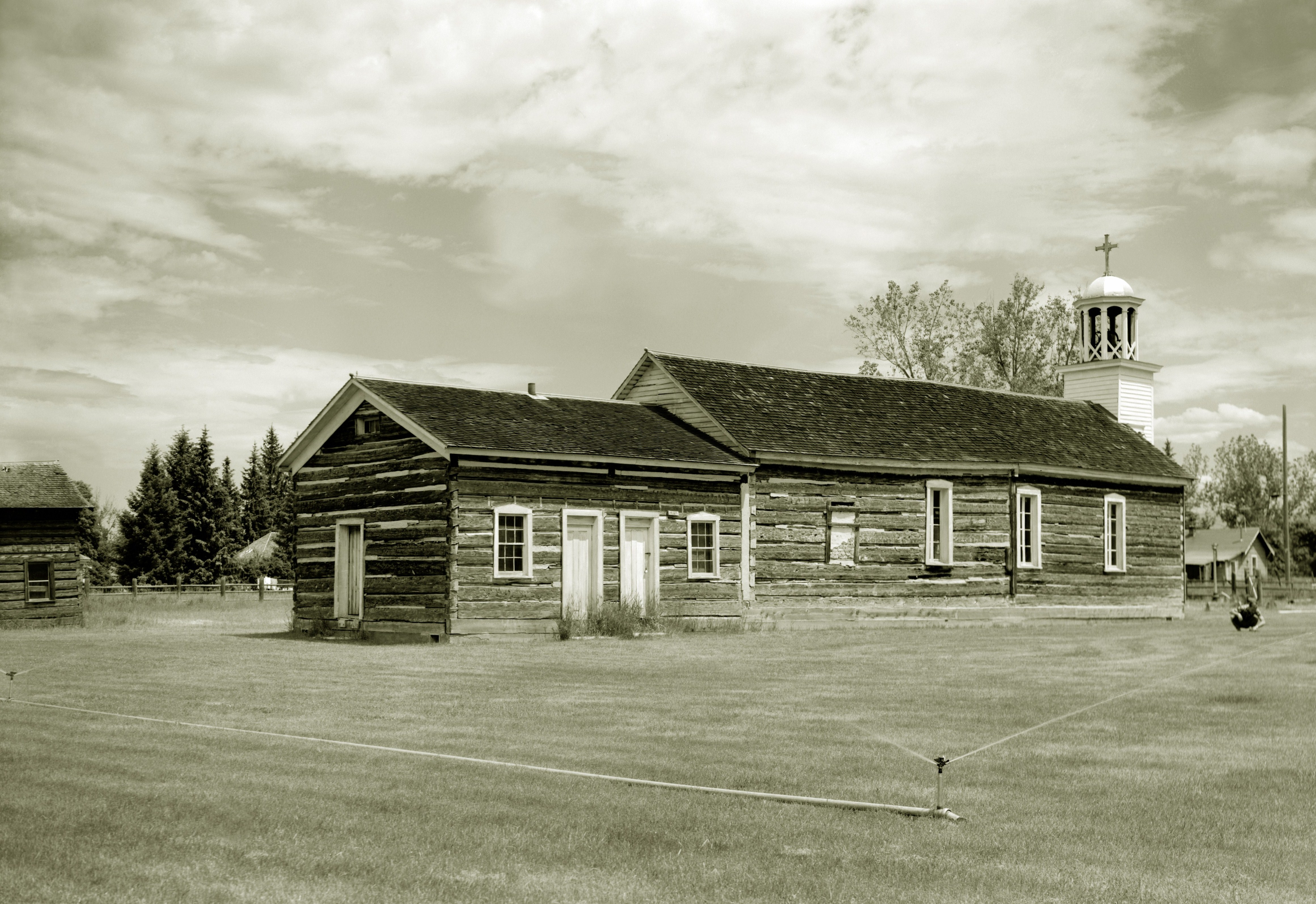
- Side and rear of the church

- Location within Montana Location within the United States
- Location: North Avenue, Stevensville, Montana
- Coordinates: 46°30′29″N 114°5′43″W
- Area: 2 acres (0.81 ha)
- Built: 1866
- NRHP reference No.: 70000364
- Added to NRHP: October 6, 1970

The Historic St. Mary's Mission is a mission established by the Society of Jesus of the Catholic Church, located now on Fourth Street in modern-day Stevensville, Montana. Founded in 1841 and designed as an ongoing village for Catholic Salish Indians, St. Mary's was the first permanent settlement made by non-indigenous peoples in what became the state of Montana. The mission structure was rebuilt in 1866. It was listed on the National Register of Historic Places in 1970.

== Searching for the Black Robes ==
The Salish came to know about the Jesuits from Catholic Iroquois fur trappers who settled among them either in 1811, or sometime after 1816. Especially Ignace (Big Ignace) aroused attention with his stories about the "Black Robes". Indian delegations reached St. Louis in 1831 and 1835, both in vain, asking for a priest to follow them back to the Salish country.

Lakotas near Ash Hollow (Nebraska) killed a third group sent to make the same request in 1837, including Ignace. In 1839, two Iroquois Indians met Father De Smet at Council Bluff, by chance, and they relayed the request again. In July 1840, Father De Smet was greeted by more than 1,000 Salish and Pend d'Oreille Indians in Pierre's Hole. He promised to fulfill the request within a year.

On September 24 the next year, Father De Smet returned to the Salish. Accompanying him to the Bitterroot Valley were Fathers Gregory Mengarini and Nicholas Point, as well as Brothers Joseph Specht, William Claessens, and Charles Huett.

== Construction ==
Brother Claessens was a carpenter and led the building of the church. As construction began under the supervision of Pierre-Jean De Smet, he described St. Mary's and the Salish workforce as follows:

The women hewed down the timber, assisted by their husbands, with the greatest alacrity and expedition, and in a few weeks we had constructed a log church, capable of holding 900 persons. To ornament the interior, the women placed mats of a species long grass, which were hung on the roof and sides of the church, and spread over the floor,-- it was then adorned with festoons formed of branches of cedar and pine.

Nicolas Point's plan included houses with lawns. They were built in harmony with that plan although it made the village open to attacks. A palisade shielded the church. The first communion was at Easter 1842. At this time, Chief Victor held the position as principal representative for the Bitterroot Salish.

Father Anthony Ravalli joined the mission in 1845. He inoculated the Indians against smallpox and ran the dispensary.

In 1846, the fields yielded 7,000 bushels of wheat and a considerable quantum of garden crops. However, by this time many Salish Indians had turned their backs to the mission and slowly, took up their former lifestyle. They felt betrayed by the establishment of a mission at Colville for the Blackfeet, who were their enemies.

== Closure and destruction ==
Raids by those Blackfeet Indians closed the mission in 1850. The abandoned church was burned to the ground, following the usual practice in such raids. The Jesuits then sold the village to Trader John Owen for 250 dollars, even though it had been built on Salish land.

== Reestablishment and changes ==
After sixteen years, St. Mary's mission started afresh in 1866. It was relocated a mile south of the first colony. The Catholic Salish attended sermons in the new church and later, settlers in the area would come as well. The church was enlarged in 1879.

In October 1891, Chief Charlo and the Bitterroot Salish were forced to move to the Jocko Reservation. That was the end of St. Mary's as an Indian mission. In 1921, the church became St. Mary's Parish. In 1953, work began on a new chapel, and with its dedication in 1954, the historic St. Mary's chapel was retired. It underwent restorations in the 1970s and 80s, and the Jesuits' kitchen was reconstructed. In 1996, a visitor center and museum were added. The St. Mary's Mission Historic District was added to the National Register of Historic Places in 2010.

== Current status ==
The mission complex is open for tours from April through October. The buildings include the chapel with an attached residence, the infirmary, a dovecote, a cabin with Salish artifacts, and a visitor center that contains a museum, a research library, an art gallery, and a gift shop.
