= Bitterroot Valley =

Valley in southwestern Montana

Coordinates: 46.247°N 114.160°W

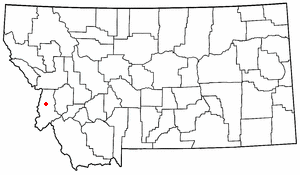
Location of the Bitterroot Valley within Montana.

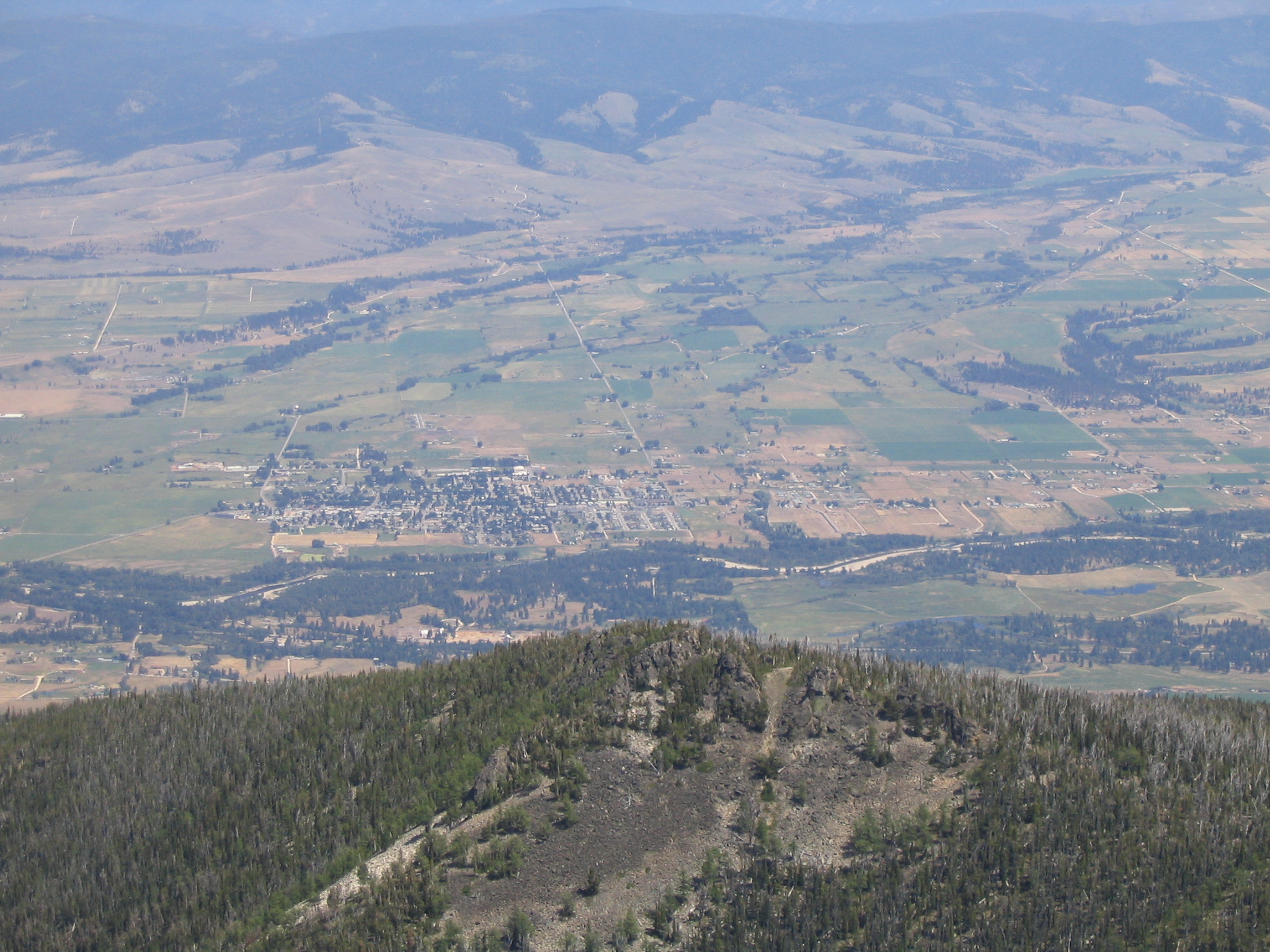
Bitterroot Valley, from St. Mary's Peak in the Bitterroot Range.

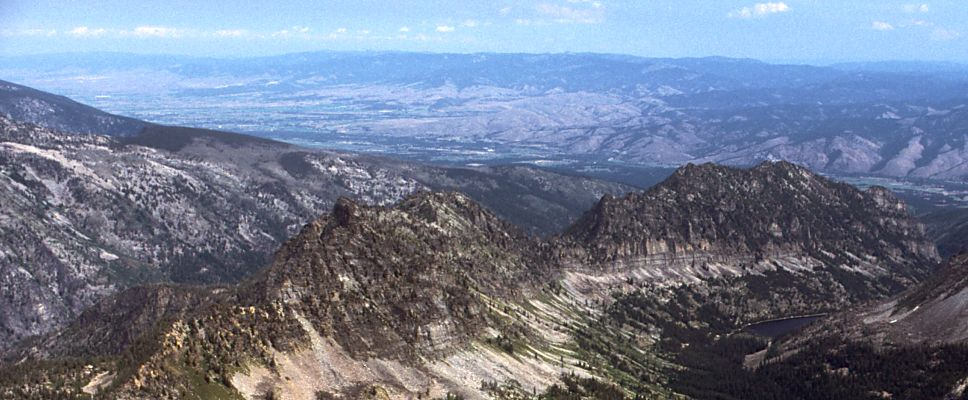
View of northern valley, northeast from El Capitan Peak in the Bitterroot National Forest.

The Bitterroot Valley is located in southwestern Montana, along the Bitterroot River between the Bitterroot Range and Sapphire Mountains, in the Northwestern United States.

== Geography ==
The valley extends approximately 95 miles (153 km) from Lost Trail Pass in Idaho, where it is narrow, to a point near the city of Missoula along Interstate 90 where it is wider and flatter. To the west is the Bitterroot Range and its large Selway-Bitterroot Wilderness Area, and to the east is the smaller Sapphire Mountains and their Anaconda-Pintler Wilderness Area. The Bitterroot Range has steep faces, deep canyons, is heavily forested, and is within the Bitterroot National Forest. The Sapphire Mountains are more rounded, drier, and much less forested.

The southern end of the valley is split into the East and West Forks of the Bitterroot River, and the northern end has the confluence of the Bitterroot River with the Clark Fork River. Connecting into the west side of the valley are numerous deeply carved granite canyons, including scenic Blodgett Canyon and Lolo Creek's canyon.

The vegetation in the valley has been significantly transformed. Originally it was covered in sagebrush.

Highway 93 runs through the center of the valley, exiting to the south over 7,014 feet (2,138 m) Lost Trail Pass. U.S. Highway 93 is the main travel choice through the Bitterroot Valley, but the East Side Highway also runs through the valley, although it is much less traveled.

=== Communities ===
Communities within the valley include: Lolo in Missoula County; and Florence, Stevensville, Victor, Corvallis, Hamilton, Darby, Conner, and Sula in Ravalli County.

Hamilton, the largest town and the county seat of Ravalli County, is located at 46°14.8'N and 114°09.6'W at an elevation of 3,570 feet (1,090 m) with a population of 12,000. Business opportunities within these cities include manufacturing, agriculture, craft breweries, wineries, recreational services, and many entrepreneurs.

== History ==
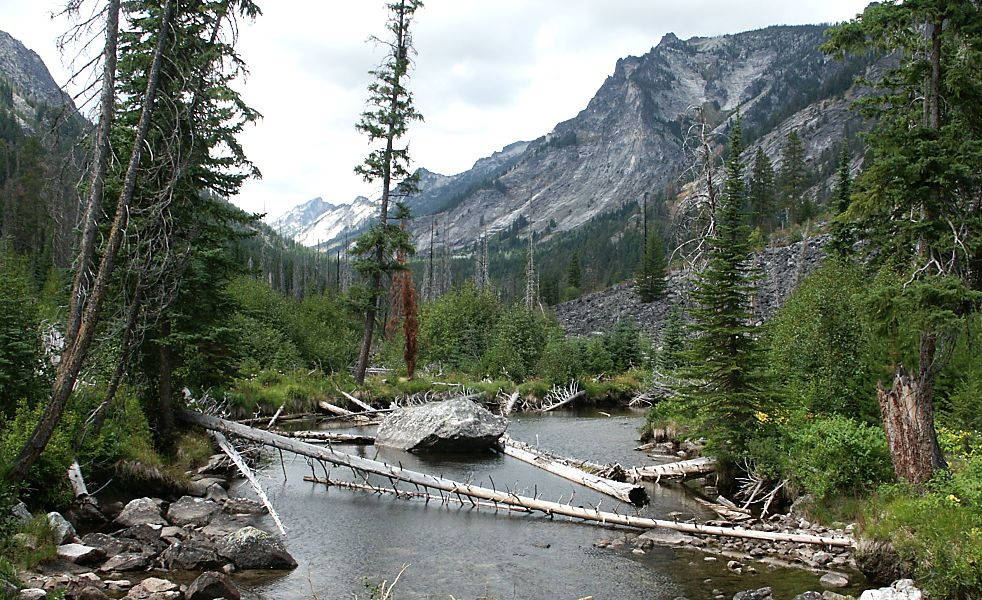
Blodgett Canyon, to the west in the Bitterroot Range.

The valley was the ancestral home of the Bitterroot Salish tribe of the Flathead nation.

In early September 1805, the Lewis and Clark Expedition crossed Lost Trail Pass from present-day Idaho in order to connect with the overland route through the Rocky Mountains. Passing down Camp Creek and the East Fork, they followed the Bitterroot River northward to the point where it connects with the Nez Perce Trail and Lolo Creek. Before continuing their difficult journey to the west, they named their camp Traveler's Rest. Returning to this site in early July of the following year, they split their Corps of Discovery, furthering their explorations both to the northeast (Lewis) and to the south (Clark).

In 1841, Jesuit priests led by Pierre-Jean De Smet founded St. Mary's Mission near present-day Stevensville. It was the first permanent white settlement in what is now Montana. Fort Owen was established nearby in 1850, and difficult relations occurred between the white settlers and the Salish until 1891, when the native tribes were forcibly relocated to the Flathead Indian Reservation. In 1877, Chief Joseph and the Nez Perce tribe passed south through the Bitterroot Valley, fleeing the U.S. Army. They exited the East Fork via Gibbons Pass, near where they fought at the Battle of the Big Hole.

The Bitterroot Valley had nearly a million apple trees in the early 1900s, and was one of the world's largest producers of MacIntosh apples at that time. Irrigation was provided by about 80 miles (130 km) of canals. Although the Bitterroot Valley's orchards became less competitive with apple orchards in Washington state after hailstorms in 1922 and 1923, it is still home to one of the nation's largest cider orchards.

Settlement has continued since that time. The population of Ravalli County in the 2000 census was 36,070; 40,212 in the 2010 census. The major industries are ranching, agriculture, forestry, and tourism.

== Recreation ==
The Bitterroot Valley offers many recreational activities, including: hiking, backpacking, mountain biking, and rock climbing in the surrounding mountains; and birding and fishing along the Bitterroot River. The valley is popular with hunters, for big game, upland birds, and waterfowl. Grizzly bear activity in the area has steadily increased since 2013 with officials saying it is important to be extra cautious during recreational activities.

== In popular culture ==
The Bitterroot Valley is mentioned as the protagonist's birthplace in the song "Wild Montana Skies," from John Denver's album It's About Time (1983).

The valley is the primary shooting location of the television series Yellowstone.

== See also ==
- Bitterroot River
- Flathead Indian Reservation
