= Bitterroot Salish =

Native American group in Montana

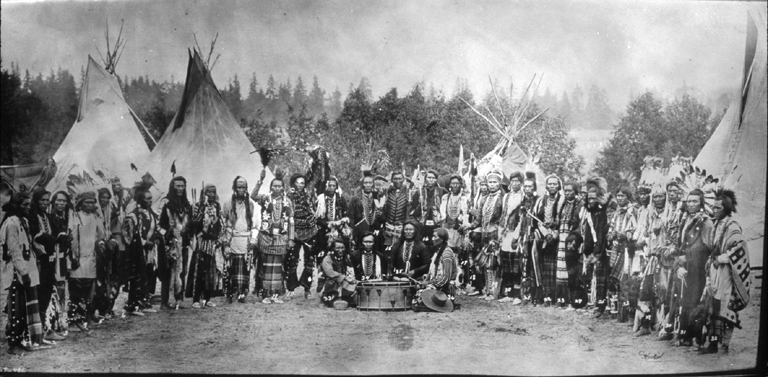
Salish Men Near Tipis (1903 Flathead Reservation, Montana)

The Bitterroot Salish peoples (or Flathead, Salish, Séliš) are a Salish-speaking group of Native Americans, and one of three tribes of the Confederated Salish and Kootenai Tribes of the Flathead Nation in Montana. The Flathead Reservation is also home to the Kootenai and Pend d'Oreilles tribes. Bitterroot Salish Peoples or Flathead originally lived in an area west of Billings, Montana, extending to the continental divide in the west and south of Great Falls, Montana extending to the Montana–Wyoming border. From there they later moved west into the Bitterroot Valley. By request, a Catholic mission was built there in 1841. In 1891 they were forcibly moved to the Flathead Reservation.

== Alternative names ==
The Bitterroot Salish are known by various names including Salish, Selish, and Flathead. The name "Flathead" was a term used to identify any Native tribes who had practiced head flattening. The Salish, however, deny that their ancestors engaged in this practice. Instead, they believe that this name caught on because of their identifying sign in the Coast Salish Sign Language. Namely because it involved pressing both sides of the head with your hands, which meant 'we the people'.

== Language ==
The people are an Interior Salish group of Native Americans. They speak Salish, the namesake of the entire Salishan languages family. The Interior Salish group consists of the Flathead (Séliš), Kalispell (Qlispé) and Spokane.

According to Salish history, the Salish speaking people originally lived as one large nation thousands of years ago. Their region stretched from Montana all the way to the Pacific Coast. Tribal elders say that the tribes started to break into smaller groups as the population became too big to sustain its needs in just one central location.

Following the dispersion the Salishan languages had branched into different dialects from various regions the tribes dispersed to. Centuries later, the separated groups of Salishan peoples became distinct and their corresponding languages had developed into the Salishan language family. The eastern sub-family family is known as Interior Salish. They consist of the Spokane language (npoqínišcn) spoken by the Spokane people, the Kalispel language (qlispé) spoken by the Pend d'Oreilles tribe, and the Bitterroot Salish (séliš) language.

== History ==
=== Origins ===
The tribes' oral history tells of having been placed in their Indigenous homelands, which is now present-day Montana, from when Coyote killed the nałisqelixw, which literally translates into people-eaters.

Our story begins when the Creator put the animal people on this earth. He sent Coyote ahead as this world was full of evils and not yet fit for mankind. Coyote came with his brother Fox, to this big island, as the elders call this land, to free it of these evils. They were responsible for creating many geographical formations and providing good and special skills and knowledge for man to use. Coyote, however, left many faults such as greed, jealousy, hunger, envy, and many other imperfections that we know of today

— Clarence Woodcock

Within many of the Coyote stories, there are vivid descriptions relating to the history of the geological events that had occurred near the last ice age. Stories that include "the extension of glaciers down what is now Flathead Lake, the flooding of western Montana beneath a great lake, the final retreat of the bitter cold weather as the ice age came to an end, the disappearance of large animals like giant beaver and their replacement by the present-day smaller versions of those creatures". Archaeologists have been able to document a continuous occupancy within some sites as far back as 12,600 years ago during the final retreat of the glaciers. Some stories suggest that occupancy can go far back as 40,000 years when the ice age had already begun.

=== Bitterroot Valley ===
The Bitterroot Salish began to occupy the Bitterroot Valley in the 1700s when pressure from westward-moving Plains tribes pushed them off the plains. About the same time, smallpox swept through the tribe, causing a population decline. The people adapted, practicing a seasonal round and traveling across the continental divide once or twice each year to hunt buffalo. They sought alliances with tribes to the west in order to strengthen their defense against Plains tribes like the Blackfeet.

==== St. Mary's Mission ====
Sometime before Lewis and Clark reached the Bitterroot in 1805, Xalíqs (Shining Shirt), a Salish prophet, foretold that fair-skinned men dressed in black robes would arrive in the valley to teach the people new morals and a new way to pray. These men, who wore crosses and did not take wives, would bring peace, but their coming would be the beginning of the end of all native people. By the 1830s, Jesuit-educated Iroquois trappers had settled in the Bitterroot and told the Salish about the "powerful medicine" of Catholicism. Remembering Xalíqs's prophecy, the Salish sent delegations in 1831, 1835, 1837, and 1839 to St. Louis asking for Black Robes to come to the valley. The 1839 delegation convinced Father Pierre-Jean DeSmet, S.J., to visit Salish territory.

In the summer of 1840, 1,600 Salish and Pend d'Oreilles met DeSmet at Pierre's Hole. About 350 chose to be baptized, including several leaders: Tjolzhitsay (Big Face), Walking Bear, and Victor ( Xweɫxƛ̣ ̓cín or Many Horses). DeSmet traveled back east to get funding for a mission, returning to the Bitterroot in September 1841 with five more Jesuit priests. They established St. Mary's Mission. Many Salish people chose to adopt elements of Catholicism that were complementary to their own beliefs, including ideas of "generosity, community, obedience, and respect for family." The Salish also found power in Catholic "chant, prayer, and devotional hymns; a sacred calendar associated with sacred colors; the veneration of sacramental objects and sacred sites; water used for purification"; and other practices. The Salish did not embrace all Catholic teachings, however. They rejected the doctrines of hell and sin. And, when the priests sought to teach them agriculture, most chose to continue their seasonal round. The Jesuits tried to stamp out Salish traditions that contradicted Catholic teachings; they gathered the medicine men and insisted they throw away their sacred bundles into a hole near the church. Much of the generational knowledge of the medicine men was lost due to Jesuit interference.

==== Hellgate Treaty ====
In 1855, Isaac Stevens, the Governor and Superintendent of Indian Affairs for Washington Territory, invited Victor (Xweɫxƛ̣ ̓cín), head chief of the Bitterroot Salish; Tmɫxƛ̣ ̓cín (No Horses or Alexander), head chief of the Pend d'Oreilles; and Michelle, head chief of the Kootenais to a council in present-day Missoula, Montana. The tribal leaders were told that Stevens wanted to talk about a peace treaty; however, the chiefs and headmen were surprised and angered to discover Stevens's primary purpose was to discuss cession of Indian lands. Similar to other negotiations with Plateau tribes, Stevens's goal was to concentrate numerous tribes within a single reservation, thereby making way for white settlement on as much land as possible. Stevens attempted to convince the chiefs to sign the Hellgate treaty, relinquishing their territories in exchange for $120,000. The treaty provided for the Flathead Indian Reservation in the lower Flathead River Valley, where the tribes would be moved.

When Xweɫxƛ̣ ̓cín (Victor) refused to relinquish the Bitterroot Valley, Stevens inserted Article 11 into the agreement. This article designated approximately 1.7 million acres in the Bitterroot as a provisional reservation. According to the terms, the valley would be surveyed, after which the president would determine whether the Bitterroot reservation or the Flathead reservation would be "better adapted to the wants of the Flathead tribe." In the meantime, the U.S. government was to keep white settlers out of the Bitterroot Valley. Father Adrian Hoecken, S.J., who observed the council proceedings, wrote, "What a ridiculous tragi-comedy the whole council proved. It would take too long to write it all down—ah well! Not a tenth of it was actually understood by either party, for Ben Kyser [the translator] speaks Flathead very badly and is no better at translating into English."

The question of a Bitterroot reservation was left in limbo when Congress failed to ratify the treaty until 1859. In the meantime, Stevens ordered only a cursory survey of the valley, instructing R. H. Lansdale to ride around the two proposed reservations. Stevens instructed Lansdale, "weight must be given to the fact that a large number of Indians prefer the Flathead River reservation." After riding around the valleys, Lansdale obediently reported, "the northern district is preferable." Distracted by the Civil War, the U.S. government delayed to settle the Bitterroot question. In the meantime, it failed to uphold its promise to keep settlers out of the valley.

==== Garfield Treaty ====
After the death of Victor (Xweɫxƛ̣ ̓cín) in 1870, his son Charlo (Sɫm̓xẹ Q̓woxq̣eys, Claw of the Small Grizzly Bear) was chosen as the next chief. White settlers and Montana's territorial delegate saw this transition of leadership as an opportunity to force the Salish onto the Flathead reservation. In 1871, President Ulysses S. Grant issued an executive order to remove the Salish from the Bitterroot. In 1872, Congressman James A. Garfield arrived to negotiate the removal. When Charlo refused to leave the valley, Garfield assumed the Salish would change their mind and proceeded "with the work in the same manner as though Charlo [Xweɫxƛ̣ ̓cín], first chief, had signed the contract." When Chief Charlo refused to sign, U.S officials forged Charlo's "x" onto the official copy of the agreement that was sent to the Senate for Ratification.The original field copy of the agreement, which remains in the National Archives, has no "x" besides Charlo's name, the official copies that Congress had voted on had an "x" by his name. This only enraged the tribe and strengthened their resolve to not leave the Bitterroot Valley, despite declining conditions. In order to secure a signature on the agreement, government officials recognized Arlee as chief. Arlee led a small group of Salish to the Flathead in 1873. Most of the people stayed in the Bitterroot with Charlo, and some received "permanently inalienable" patents to farms in the valley. The government viewed them as U.S. citizens who had severed tribal relations, but the people still saw themselves as an independent tribal community.

==== Removal ====
The Bitterroot Salish continued to practice their seasonal round in the Bitterroot Valley as long as possible. The devastation of the buffalo herds in the 1870s and 1880s forced them to turn to farming and ranching. They had some success with agriculture until an unprecedented drought in 1889. With food scarce, the people suffered and finally began to consider the U.S. government's offer of land on the Flathead Reservation.

In October 1889, retired general Henry B. Carrington arrived in the Bitterroot to negotiate with the Salish and convince them to move to the Flathead once and for all. Carrington tried to gain Charlo's trust, first with gifts, then by bringing out the original 1872 Garfield agreement to address Charlo's claim that he never signed it. He also made many promises to the people: they would get to pick out good farms on the Flathead reservation, they would receive assistance with plowing and fencing their new farms, every family with children would get a cow, and they would receive rations until the move or until they received money from the sale of their Bitterroot lands. At first, the Salish rejected Carrington's offers and refused to sign the agreement. They asked for the "literal execution" of the Hellgate treaty, but Carrington did not acknowledge their request.

Finally, Charlo signed Carrington's agreement on November 3, 1889. The Salish were forced to accept removal to the Flathead, making the painful decision to give up their homeland in order to preserve their people and culture. They left the valley on October 15, 1891. Charlo organized the march himself and insisted that it take place without a white military escort. However, Salish oral histories and newspaper accounts indicate that troops were present during the removal. Elders later remembered the three-day, sixty-mile journey as a funeral march. Some historians have nicknamed this event Montana's Trail of Tears or the Salish Trail of Tears.

=== Flathead Indian Reservation ===
During and after the removal to the Flathead, the Salish had to contend with broken government promises. They received insufficient rations. They never received the promised assistance with plowing and fencing or the promised cows. In 1910, the Flathead reservation was opened to white homesteaders through the efforts of Congressman Joseph M. Dixon. The Bitterroot Salish weathered all of these attacks and created a community on the reservation.

In the 1920s, the tribes on the Flathead reservation forced the U.S. government to recognize their ownership interest in the Kerr Dam, or Seli’š Ksanka Qlispe’ Dam. The Salish joined the other tribes on the reservation to create the Confederated Salish and Kootenai Tribes (CSKT). In 1953, when the U.S. government targeted the tribes for termination, the CSKT cultivated support from Montana politicians and successfully defended against the attack. In the later half of the twentieth century, Salish people completed academic degrees and expanded their political influence. At the same time in the 80s, Agnes Vanderburg established an annual camp to teach traditional skills to the next generation. Tribal management of the bison at the National Bison Range was restored through legislative approval in 2020 and executive approval from Secretary of the Interior Deb Haaland under the Biden administration in 2021. Today, the Salish continue their efforts to preserve the tribe and to protect their interests.
