= List of mountains in Ravalli County, Montana =

There are at least 86 named mountains in Ravalli County, Montana.

- Bald Top Mountain, 46°05′46″N 113°56′09″W, el. 7,313 feet (2,229 m)
- Bare Cone, 45°43′10″N 114°24′44″W, el. 7,821 feet (2,384 m)
- Bare Hill, 46°02′54″N 113°44′49″W, el. 8,750 feet (2,670 m)
- Bare Peak, 45°50′51″N 114°24′19″W, el. 9,285 feet (2,830 m)
- Bass Peak, 46°34′41″N 114°19′06″W, el. 8,760 feet (2,670 m)
- Beaver Point, 45°32′04″N 114°20′14″W, el. 7,401 feet (2,256 m)
- Bitterroot Mountains, 45°48′28″N 113°56′20″W, el. 5,256 feet (1,602 m)
- Black Bear Point, 46°08′26″N 113°55′00″W, el. 7,529 feet (2,295 m)
- Blacktail Point, 46°05′40″N 114°02′42″W, el. 6,440 feet (1,960 m)
- Blue Mountain, 45°58′17″N 113°50′28″W, el. 7,454 feet (2,272 m)
- Blue Nose, 45°28′22″N 114°21′32″W, el. 8,642 feet (2,634 m)
- Boulder Peak, 45°50′49″N 114°20′33″W, el. 9,767 feet (2,977 m)
- Boulder Point, 45°50′16″N 114°17′20″W, el. 7,733 feet (2,357 m)
- Brandy Peak, 46°06′31″N 114°19′17″W, el. 7,438 feet (2,267 m)
- Canyon Peak, 46°14′42″N 114°21′14″W, el. 9,104 feet (2,775 m)
- Castle Rock, 45°43′04″N 114°28′04″W, el. 7,654 feet (2,333 m)
- Chaffin Butte, 46°20′11″N 114°01′28″W, el. 4,967 feet (1,514 m)
- Cleveland Mountain, 46°36′54″N 113°49′00″W, el. 7,329 feet (2,234 m)
- Cliff Point, 45°56′23″N 113°36′33″W, el. 8,333 feet (2,540 m)
- Cold Spring Hill, 46°03′29″N 114°02′59″W, el. 6,847 feet (2,087 m)
- Como Peaks, 46°00′07″N 114°21′05″W, el. 9,567 feet (2,916 m)
- Coyote Peak, 45°52′06″N 114°02′05″W, el. 5,000 feet (1,500 m)
- Deer Creek Point, 45°34′38″N 114°25′25″W, el. 8,343 feet (2,543 m)
- Deer Mountain, 46°01′34″N 114°03′18″W, el. 7,290 feet (2,220 m)
- Dineen Hill, 46°24′32″N 114°10′52″W, el. 3,625 feet (1,105 m)
- Dome Shaped Mountain, 46°18′21″N 113°46′52″W, el. 8,658 feet (2,639 m)
- Dominic Buttes, 46°19′09″N 113°55′03″W, el. 7,798 feet (2,377 m)
- Dominic Point, 46°19′28″N 113°56′21″W, el. 7,569 feet (2,307 m)
- Don Mackey Point, 46°15′51″N 114°14′35″W, el. 5,417 feet (1,651 m)
- Doran Point, 45°56′48″N 114°02′33″W, el. 6,253 feet (1,906 m)
- Downing Mountain, 46°14′01″N 114°18′02″W, el. 8,642 feet (2,634 m)
- Dutch Hill, 46°19′11″N 114°11′30″W, el. 3,825 feet (1,166 m)
- El Capitan, 46°00′27″N 114°23′48″W, el. 9,924 feet (3,025 m)
- Falls Point, 45°42′01″N 114°04′00″W, el. 7,982 feet (2,433 m)
- Gash Point, 46°26′01″N 114°19′11″W, el. 8,740 feet (2,660 m)
- Goat Mountain, 46°11′59″N 114°14′57″W, el. 5,978 feet (1,822 m)
- Grouse Butte, 45°57′33″N 114°12′04″W, el. 5,535 feet (1,687 m)
- Harlan Point, 46°04′29″N 114°06′05″W, el. 6,407 feet (1,953 m)
- Heavenly Twins, 46°30′51″N 114°17′53″W, el. 9,291 feet (2,832 m)
- Hilltop, 45°49′44″N 113°51′38″W, el. 7,254 feet (2,211 m)
- Hughes Point, 45°40′33″N 114°01′57″W, el. 8,205 feet (2,501 m)
- Indian Hill, 45°47′26″N 114°32′39″W, el. 8,281 feet (2,524 m)
- Jew Mountain, 45°40′45″N 114°13′30″W, el. 7,972 feet (2,430 m)
- Jim Hell Rock, 45°50′42″N 114°00′07″W, el. 4,400 feet (1,300 m)
- Kent Peak, 46°03′48″N 113°47′36″W, el. 8,983 feet (2,738 m)
- Koch Mountain, 46°04′38″N 114°22′00″W, el. 9,048 feet (2,758 m)
- Lookout Mountain, 45°38′05″N 114°15′27″W, el. 7,831 feet (2,387 m)
- Mill Point, 46°17′25″N 114°16′45″W, el. 8,415 feet (2,565 m)
- Mount Jerusalem, 45°49′29″N 114°27′40″W, el. 9,334 feet (2,845 m)
- Mountain House, 46°14′18″N 114°00′17″W, el. 5,804 feet (1,769 m)
- North Trapper Peak, 45°54′03″N 114°17′25″W, el. 9,741 feet (2,969 m)
- Old Stormy, 46°30′18″N 114°23′01″W, el. 8,169 feet (2,490 m)
- Owen Point, 46°22′05″N 113°51′25″W, el. 7,684 feet (2,342 m)
- Palisade Mountain, 46°17′57″N 113°52′18″W, el. 8,451 feet (2,576 m)
- Piquett Mountain, 45°43′54″N 114°11′30″W, el. 8,796 feet (2,681 m)
- Pyramid Buttes, 46°37′41″N 114°15′32″W, el. 8,835 feet (2,693 m)
- Quartzite Mountain, 45°38′17″N 114°08′42″W, el. 7,753 feet (2,363 m)
- Ranger Peak, 46°30′08″N 114°23′58″W, el. 8,812 feet (2,686 m)
- Razorback Mountain, 45°37′37″N 114°26′45″W, el. 8,553 feet (2,607 m)
- Reed Butte, 46°30′32″N 113°58′45″W, el. 4,731 feet (1,442 m)
- Rocky Knob, 45°49′37″N 114°07′31″W, el. 8,117 feet (2,474 m)
- Rombo Mountain, 45°44′58″N 114°12′04″W, el. 8,337 feet (2,541 m)
- Saddle Mountain, 45°43′04″N 113°59′03″W, el. 8,438 feet (2,572 m)
- Saint Joseph Peak, 46°36′06″N 114°15′17″W, el. 9,586 feet (2,922 m)
- Saint Mary Peak, 46°30′42″N 114°14′40″W, el. 9,321 feet (2,841 m)
- School Point, 45°49′42″N 114°16′03″W, el. 5,541 feet (1,689 m)
- Schoolhouse Butte, 46°21′05″N 113°59′08″W, el. 5,085 feet (1,550 m)
- Shirley Mountain, 45°53′00″N 113°53′20″W, el. 6,335 feet (1,931 m)
- Shook Mountain, 45°51′44″N 114°07′16″W, el. 7,562 feet (2,305 m)
- Skalkaho Mountain, 46°15′51″N 113°52′37″W, el. 8,448 feet (2,575 m)
- Slate Point, 45°41′21″N 114°16′46″W, el. 6,214 feet (1,894 m)
- Sugarloaf Peak, 45°56′31″N 114°18′30″W, el. 9,475 feet (2,888 m)
- Sula Peak, 45°51′37″N 113°59′59″W, el. 6,174 feet (1,882 m)
- Sweeney Peak, 46°38′53″N 114°13′17″W, el. 9,170 feet (2,800 m)
- Tabor Mountain, 46°04′57″N 114°08′40″W, el. 5,430 feet (1,660 m)
- The Lonesome Bachelor, 45°59′59″N 114°22′27″W, el. 8,970 feet (2,730 m)
- Threemile Point, 46°35′40″N 113°52′12″W, el. 5,942 feet (1,811 m)
- Thunder Mountain, 45°34′48″N 114°16′11″W, el. 7,539 feet (2,298 m)
- Totem Peak, 46°22′46″N 114°23′31″W, el. 8,248 feet (2,514 m)
- Trapper Peak, 45°53′24″N 114°17′51″W, el. 10,108 feet (3,081 m)
- Ward Mountain, 46°10′09″N 114°17′08″W, el. 9,108 feet (2,776 m)
- West Mountain, 45°37′39″N 114°21′22″W, el. 7,270 feet (2,220 m)
- Whe-lha-kleh-tseen Mountain, 46°26′04″N 113°53′02″W, el. 6,660 feet (2,030 m)
- Whites Mountain, 46°04′23″N 114°24′47″W, el. 9,157 feet (2,791 m)
- Wiles Peak, 45°44′43″N 114°09′35″W, el. 8,576 feet (2,614 m)
- Willow Mountain, 46°19′16″N 113°54′15″W, el. 8,212 feet (2,503 m)

== See also ==
- List of mountains in Montana
- List of mountain ranges in Montana
