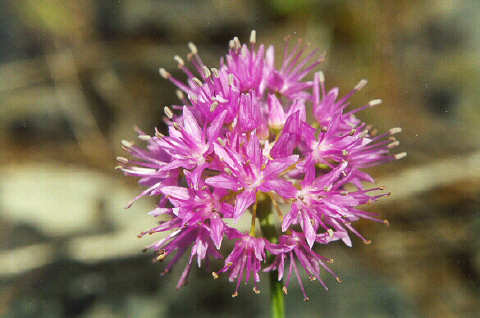

Scientific classification
- Kingdom: Plantae
- Clade: Tracheophytes
- Clade: Angiosperms
- Clade: Monocots
- Order: Asparagales
- Family: Amaryllidaceae
- Subfamily: Allioideae
- Genus: Allium
- Species: A. columbianum

Binomial name
- Allium columbianum (F.M.Ownbey & L.V.Mingrone) P. M. Peterson, Annable & L.H. Rieseberg

Synonyms
- Allium douglasii var. columbianum F.M.Ownbey & L.V.Mingrone

= Allium columbianum =

Columbian onion

Species of flowering plant

Allium columbianum, the Columbian onion, is a species of onion native to eastern Washington (Pend Oreille, Spokane, Lincoln and Whitman Counties), northern Idaho (Idaho, Clearwater, Latah and Kootenai Counties), and the Bitterroot Mountains of western Montana (Ravalli and Sanders Counties). It is a perennial herb that grows on shallow, wet soils at elevations of 300–1100 m.

Allium columbianum produces egg-shaped bulbs up to 15 mm long. Flowers are up to 10 mm across, pink to light purple with green midrib; anthers and pollen blue to gray. Flowers bloom May to July.
