= John Clegg (archaeologist) =

British born Australian archaeologist (1935–2015)

- Born: 11 January 1935
- Died: 11 March 2015 (aged 80)
- Education: Cambridge University
- Known for: Aboriginal rock art in the Sydney region
- Scientific career
- Thesis: Mathesis Words, Mathesis Pictures (1978)

John Clegg (11 January 1935 – 11 March 2015) was an Australian archaeologist who specialised in the study of rock art in which he was one of the pioneers in Australia.

== Early life and education ==
Clegg was born on 11 January 1935 in Nottingham, England and grew up in Cambridge, where his mother was an academic. John and his sister were evacuated during World War Two to Vancouver, British Columbia, Canada and in this period he began a lifelong interest in sculpture. Returning to England at the end of the war, he attended The Leys School in Cambridge, and then Magdalene College, Cambridge University, where he graduated in 1959 as a Bachelor of Arts with Honours and a Certificate in Education. In 1962, he was awarded an M.A. Honours at Cambridge where he initially read geography, but after two years changed to Archaeology.

== Move to Australia ==
Clegg undertook excavations with Eric Higgs and Charles McBurney, both of whom were influential on his studies. After these studies he worked as a school teacher, and in 1963-4 he excavated at Coygan Cave in South Wales as a contract archaeologist. In 1964, Clegg moved to Brisbane, Queensland and took up a position in archaeology in the Psychology Department of Queensland University.

== Academic career ==
Clegg's Masters Thesis Mathesis Words, Mathesis Pictures, 1978), involved an analysis of the Bare Hill rock art site located near Cairns in Queensland. This was the first study in Australia to examine rock art from an archaeological perspective. He was awarded the University Medal for this work. Clegg went on to produce over 60 archaeological papers and books, and was an eccentric and respected lecturer, who added drama and humour to his teaching. In the 1980s he took up a teaching position in the Archaeology Department of the University of Sydney. He produced a popular Field Guide to the Rock Art of Sydney (Stanbury & Clegg 1990)
