= Bitterroot Mountains =

Mountain range in Idaho and Montana, United States

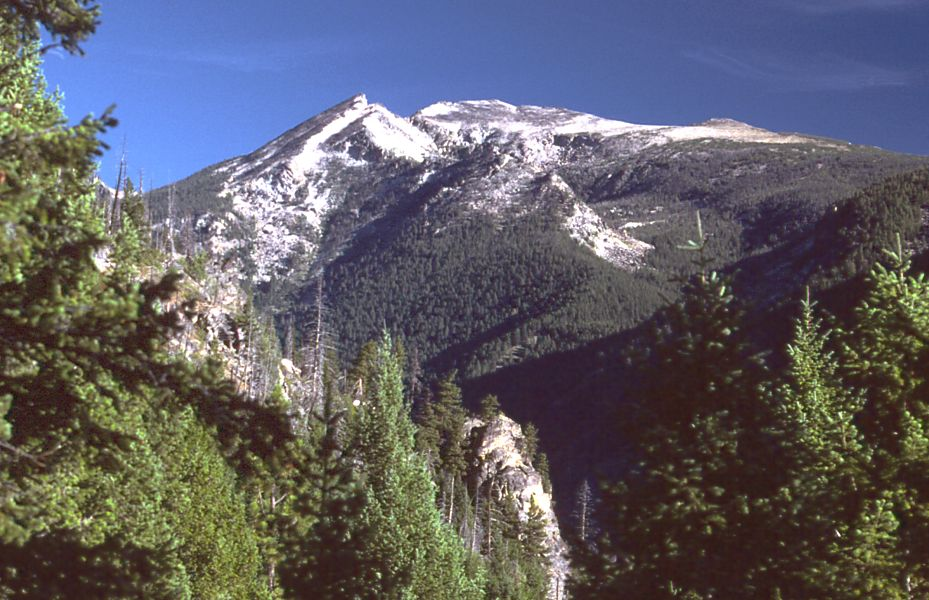
- Trapper Peak, in the Central Bitterroot Range

Highest point
- Peak: Trapper Peak
- Elevation: 10,157 ft (3,096 m)
- Coordinates: 45°53′23.43″N 114°17′52.11″W

Dimensions
- Area: 4,862 mi^{2} (12,590 km^{2})

Geography
- Country: United States
- States: Montana; Idaho
- Parent range: Bitterroot Range

The Northern and Central Bitterroot Range, collectively the Bitterroot Mountains (Salish: čkʷlkʷqin), is the largest portion of the Bitterroot Range, part of the Rocky Mountains and Idaho Batholith, located in the panhandle of Idaho and westernmost Montana in the northwestern United States. The mountains encompass an area of 4,862 square miles (12,593 km^{2}).

The mountains are bordered on the north by Lolo Creek, to the northeast by the Clark Fork, on the south by the Salmon River, on the east by the Bitterroot River and Valley, and on the west by the Selway and Lochsa Rivers. Its highest summit is Trapper Peak, at 10,157 feet (3,096 m).

== Northern Bitterroot Range ==
Northern Bitterroot Range

Highest point
- Peak: Rhodes Peak
- Elevation: 7,930 ft (2,420 m)
- Coordinates: 46°40′29.26″N 114°47′0.63″W

Dimensions
- Length: 66 mi (106 km) N/S
- Width: 88 mi (142 km) E/W
- Area: 1,869 mi^{2} (4,840 km^{2})

Geography
- Country: United States
- States/Provinces: Montana; Idaho

The Northern Bitterroot Range is the northernmost and shortest subrange of the Bitterroot Mountains. The Northern Bitterroots encompass 1,869 square miles (4,841 km^{2}) and its two tallest peaks are the 7,930 foot (2,417 m) Rhodes Peak and the 7,770 foot (2,368 m) Quartz Benchmark.

The Northern Bitterroots also contain a smaller subrange, the Grave Creek Range. The Grave Creek Range is 262 square miles (679 km^{2}) in area and its highest peak is the 7,270 foot (2,216 m) Petty Mountain.

== Central Bitterroot Range ==
Central Bitterroot Range
- Another view of Trapper Peak, from US 93

Highest point
- Peak: Trapper Peak
- Elevation: 10,157 ft (3,096 m)
- Coordinates: 45°53′23.43″N 114°17′52.11″W

Dimensions
- Length: 103 mi (166 km) N/S
- Width: 48 mi (77 km) E/W
- Area: 2,993 mi^{2} (7,750 km^{2})

Geography
- Country: United States
- States/Provinces: Montana; Idaho

The Central Bitterroot Range is the southernmost and tallest subrange of the Bitterroot Mountains. The Central Bitterroots encompass 2,993 square miles (7,752 km^{2}) and its two tallest peaks are the 10,157 foot (3,096 m) Trapper Peak and the 9,983 foot (3,043 m) El Capitan.

The Central Bitterroots also contain a smaller subrange, the Como Peaks. The Como Peaks subrange is 79 square miles (205 km^{2}) in area and its highest peak is the aforementioned El Capitan.

== History ==
The Bitterroot Mountains presented an unexpected, formidable obstacle to Lewis and Clark during their expedition westward, and ended their expectation of finding a "Northwest Passage" giving an easy connection from the Atlantic watershed to that of the Pacific.

=== Forest management ===
Guy M. Brandborg of the U.S. Forest Service, was supervisor of the Bitterroot National Forest from 1935 to 1955. By insisting on selection cutting, he tried to protect the watersheds and wildlife habitats that are harmed by clear-cutting. After he retired in 1955 Brandborg denounced the Forest Service for deviating from his model. He launched a public attack and lobbied to secure passage of the National Forest Management Act of 1976, that codified his model.

== See also ==
- Bitterroot National Forest
- List of mountain ranges in Montana
- List of mountain ranges in Idaho
