= The Lonesome Bachelor =

Mountain in the state of Montana

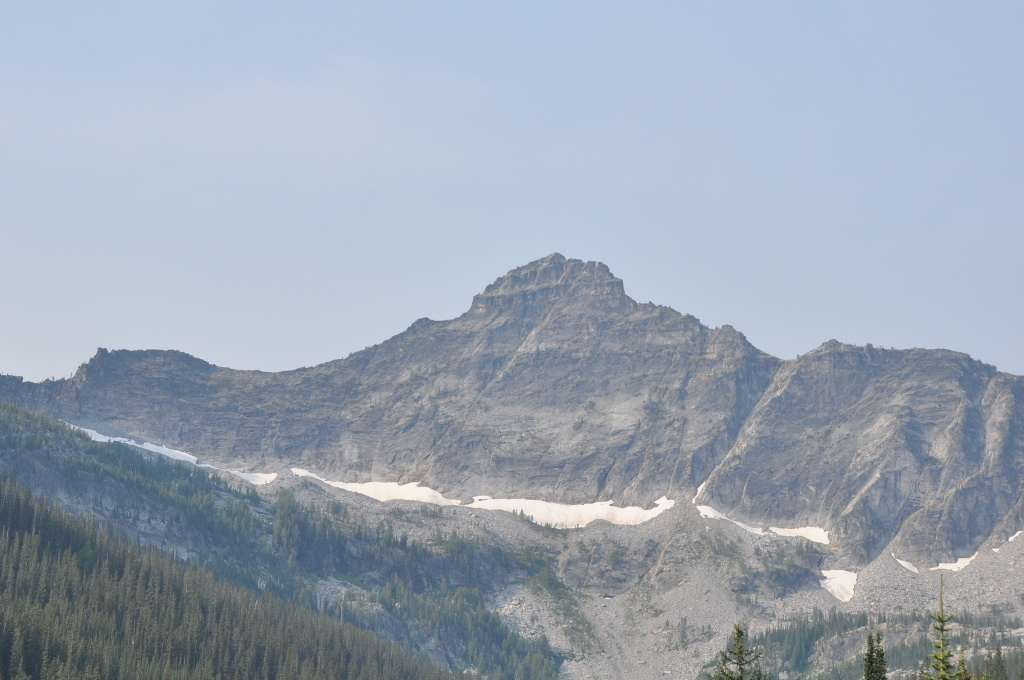
- North aspect

Highest point
- Elevation: 9,192 ft (2,802 m)
- Prominence: 491 ft (150 m)
- Parent peak: El Capitan
- Isolation: 1.09 mi (1.75 km)
- Coordinates: 45°59′59″N 114°22′27″W

Geography
- Location within Montana Location within the United States
- Country: United States
- State: Montana
- County: Ravalli
- Protected area: Selway–Bitterroot Wilderness
- Parent range: Bitterroot Range; Rocky Mountains
- Topo map: USGS Trapper Peak

The Lonesome Bachelor is a summit in Ravalli County, Montana, United States.

== Description ==
The Lonesome Bachelor is part of the Bitterroot Range which is a subrange of the Rocky Mountains. With an elevation of 9,192 feet (2,802 m), The Lonesome Bachelor is the 860th-highest summit in the state of Montana. It is located in the Selway–Bitterroot Wilderness on land managed by Bitterroot National Forest. The nearest community is Darby, 9.5 miles (15.3 km) to the east, and the nearest higher neighbor is Como Peaks, 1.1 miles (1.8 km) to the east. Precipitation runoff from the mountain's slopes drains to the Bitterroot River. Topographic relief is significant as the summit rises approximately 2,200 feet (671 meters) above headwaters of Little Rock Creek in 0.5 miles (0.80 km). This mountain's toponym has been officially adopted by the United States Board on Geographic Names.
