= Heavenly Twins (Montana) =

Double summit mountain in Montana, United States

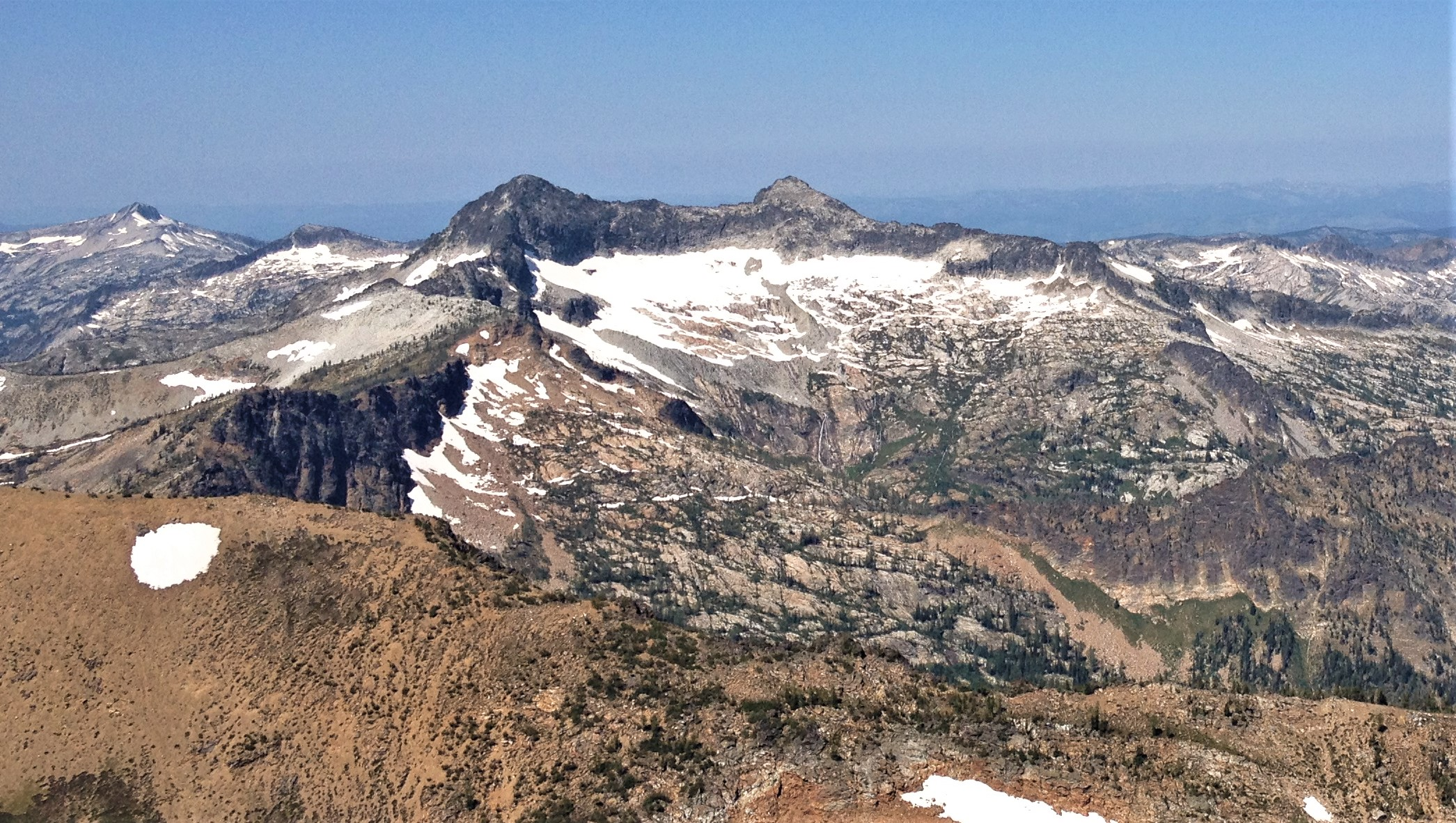
- East aspect, from Saint Mary Peak

Highest point
- Elevation: 9,282 ft (2,829 m)
- Prominence: 1,402 ft (427 m)
- Parent peak: Saint Mary Peak (9,351 ft)
- Isolation: 2.57 mi (4.14 km)
- Coordinates: 46°30′51″N 114°17′53″W

Geography
- Location within Montana Location within the United States
- Location: Ravalli County, Montana, US
- Parent range: Bitterroot Range; Rocky Mountains
- Topo map: USGS Saint Joseph Peak

Heavenly Twins is a 9,282-foot elevation (2,829 m) double summit mountain located in Ravalli County, Montana.

== Description ==
Heavenly Twins is located in the Bitterroot Range, which is a subset of the Rocky Mountains. It is situated 11 miles west of Stevensville in the Selway–Bitterroot Wilderness, on land managed by Bitterroot National Forest. The summit lies 2.5 miles east of the Continental Divide and the Idaho–Montana border. The true summit is the south peak which is one-third mile from the 9,243-ft north peak, and the nearest higher neighbor is line parent Saint Mary Peak three miles to the east. Precipitation runoff from the mountain drains into tributaries of the Bitterroot River. Topographic relief is significant as the summit rises 4,500 feet (1,400 meters) above Big Creek in two miles. This landform's toponym has been officially adopted by the United States Board on Geographic Names. The name refers to Castor and Pollux, also called the heavenly twins.

== Climate ==
Based on the Köppen climate classification, Heavenly Twins is located in a subarctic climate zone characterized by long, usually very cold winters, and mild summers. Winter temperatures can drop below −10 °F with wind chill factors below −30 °F.

== See also ==
- Geology of the Rocky Mountains
