= Como Peaks (Montana) =

Mountain in Montana, United States

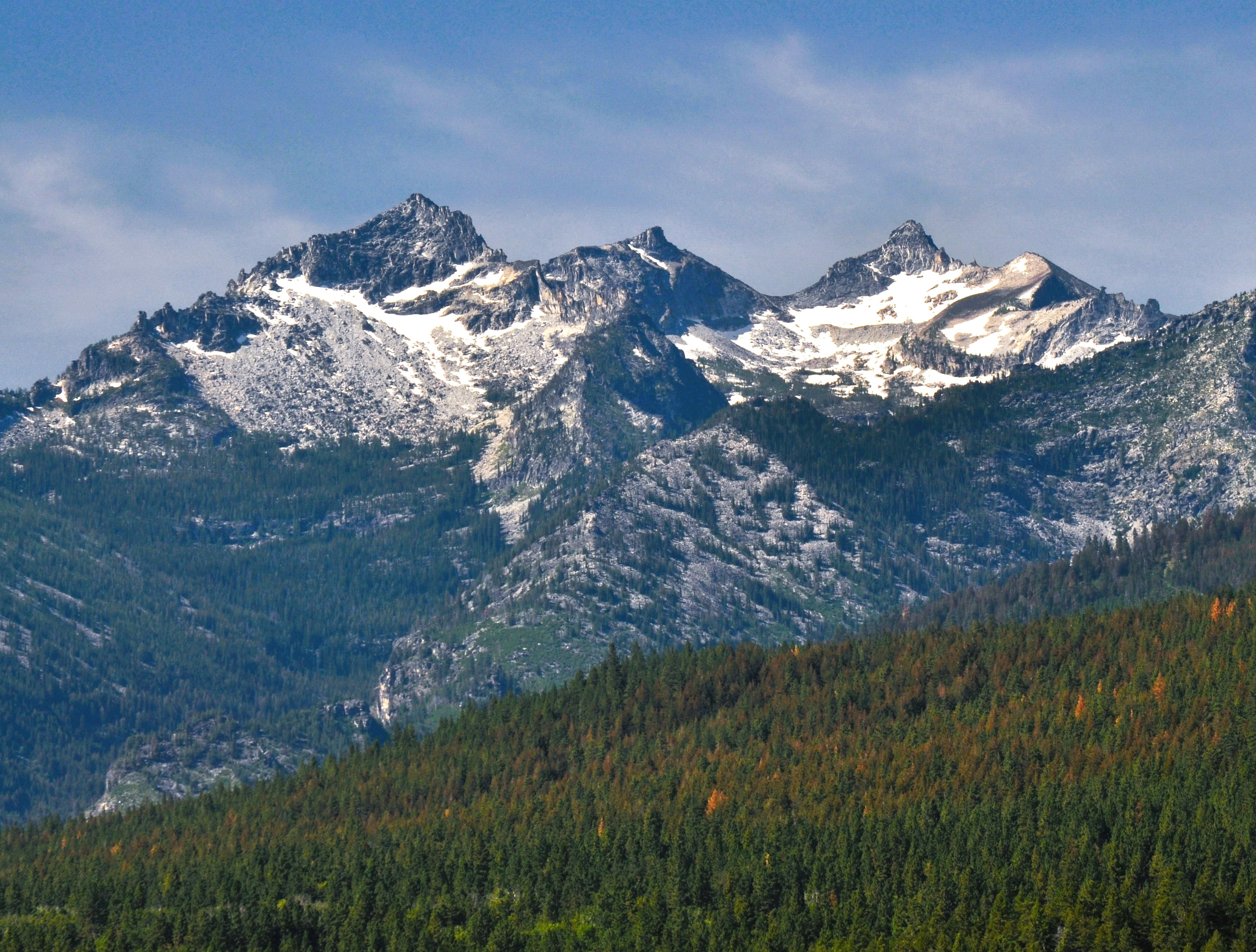
- Como Peaks from the northeast

Highest point
- Elevation: 9,624 ft (2,933 m)
- Prominence: 1,204 ft (367 m)
- Parent peak: El Capitan
- Isolation: 2.21 mi (3.56 km)
- Coordinates: 46°00′07″N 114°21′05″W

Geography
- Location within Montana Location within the United States
- Country: United States
- State: Montana
- County: Ravalli
- Protected area: Selway–Bitterroot Wilderness
- Parent range: Bitterroot Range; Rocky Mountains
- Topo map: USGS Como Peaks

Como Peaks is a 9,624-foot-elevation (2,933-meter) mountain summit in Ravalli County, Montana, United States.

== Description ==
Como Peaks is west of the Continental Divide in the Bitterroot Range which is a subrange of the Rocky Mountains. It is the eighth-highest peak in Ravalli County as well as the eighth-highest point in the Selway–Bitterroot Wilderness which is managed by Bitterroot National Forest. The nearest community is Darby, eight miles (13 km) to the east, and the nearest higher neighbor is El Capitan, 1.86 miles (2.99 km) to the west. The mountain is a set of three peaks: the West Peak is the highest point at 9,624 feet, the Middle Peak is 9,537 feet, and the East Peak is 9,493 feet. Precipitation runoff from the mountain's slopes drains to the Bitterroot River. Topographic relief is significant as the summit rises 4,400 feet (1,341 meters) above Tin Cup Creek in two miles (3.2 km), and 5,400 feet (1,646 meters) above Lake Como in four miles (6.4 km). This mountain's toponym has been officially adopted by the United States Board on Geographic Names. The mountain is named in association with nearby Lake Como which in turn was named by Antonio Ravalli in the 1840s for Lake Como in his native country of Italy. Ravalli County is named after him. The mountain is also unofficially called the Three Sisters.

== Climate ==
According to the Köppen climate classification system, the mountain is located in an alpine subarctic climate zone with long, cold, snowy winters, and cool to warm summers. Winter temperatures can drop below 0 °F with wind chill factors below −10 °F. Due to its altitude, it receives precipitation all year, as snow in winter and as thunderstorms in summer.

== See also ==
- Geology of the Rocky Mountains

== Gallery ==
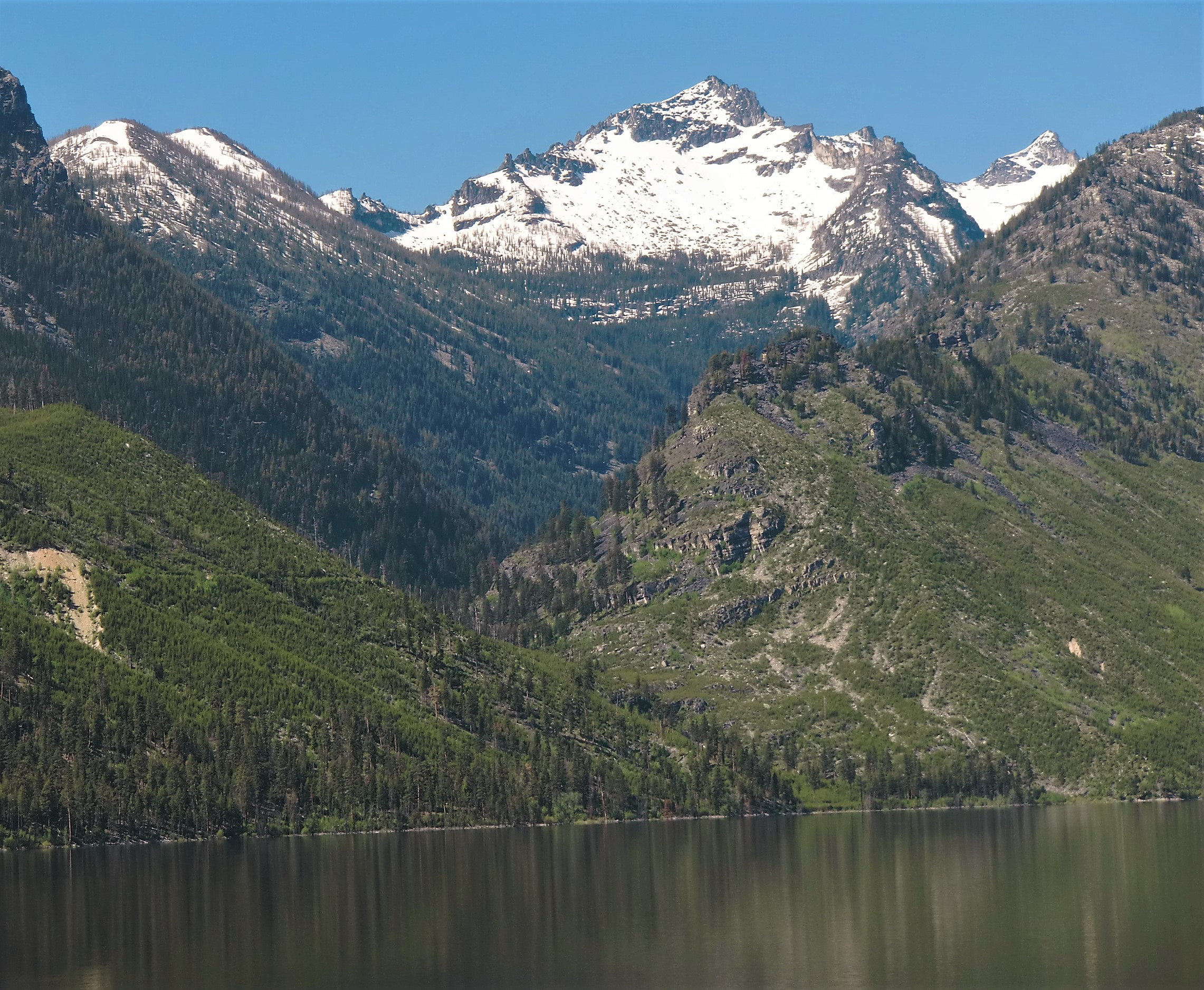
East Como Peak from Lake Como

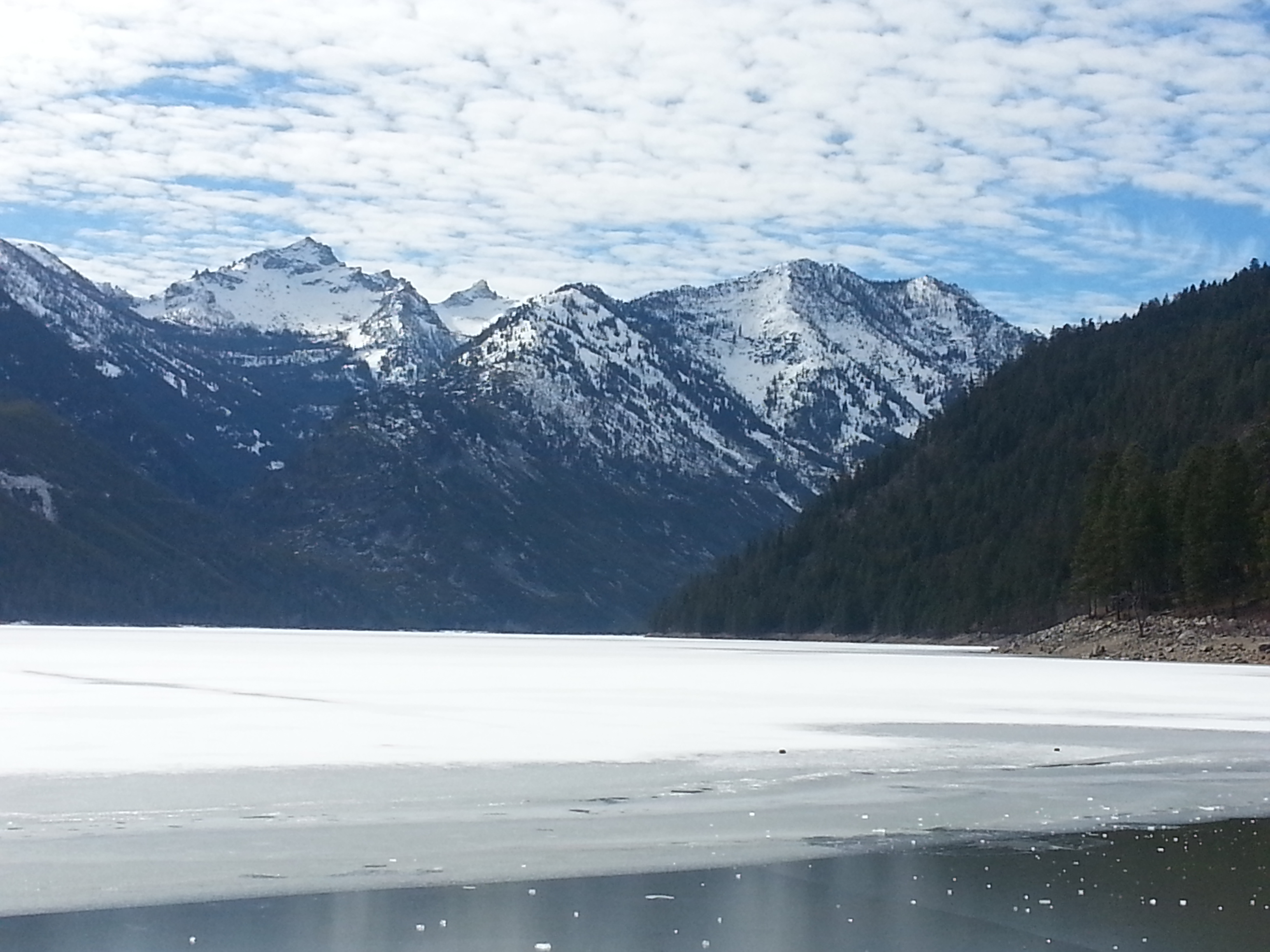
Como Peaks in winter

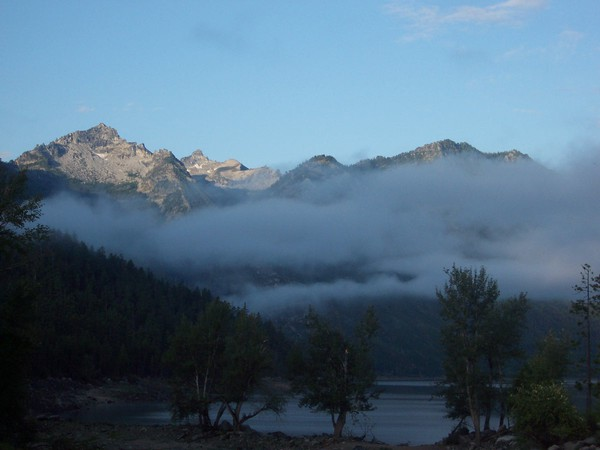
Como Peaks in autumn
