= Ranger Peak (Idaho) =

Mountain in Idaho and Montana, United States

- Location within Idaho

Highest point
- Elevation: 8,817 ft (2,687 m)
- Prominence: 1,497 ft (456 m)
- Coordinates: 46°30′08″N 114°24′00″W

Geography
- Location: Idaho, U.S.
- Topo map: USGS Ranger Peak

Ranger Peak is a mountain peak on the border of the U.S. states of Idaho and Montana.
