= El Capitan (Montana) =

Mountain in Montana, United States

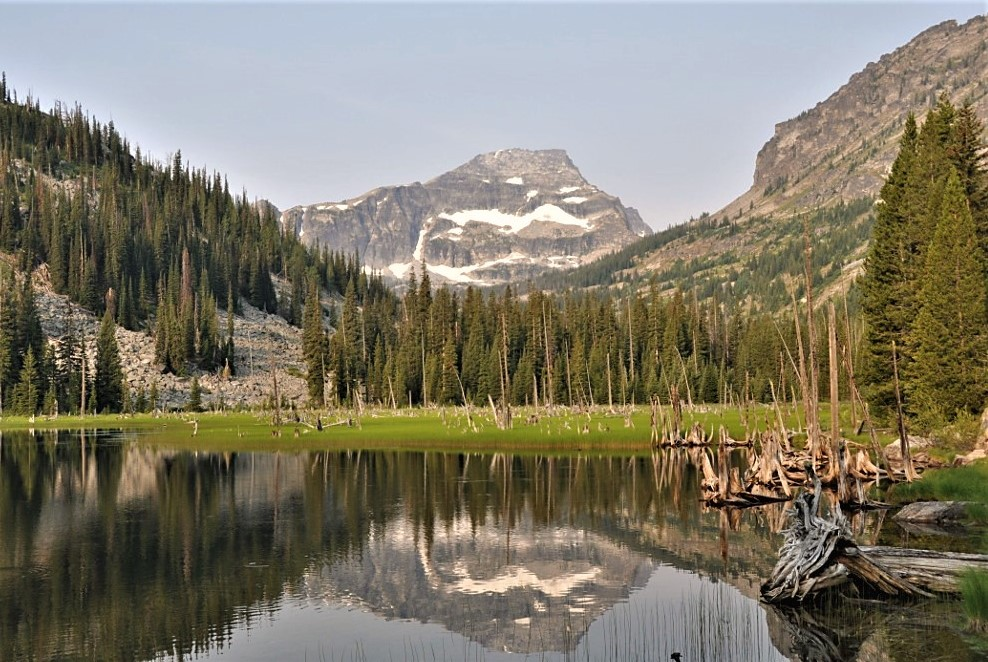
- El Capitan reflected in Little Rock Creek Lake

Highest point
- Elevation: 9,984 ft (3,043 m)
- Prominence: 1,978 ft (603 m)
- Coordinates: 46°00′27″N 114°23′48″W

Geography
- Location within Montana Location within the United States
- Location: Ravalli County, Montana, U.S.
- Parent range: Bitterroot Range
- Topo map(s): USGS El Capitan, MT

El Capitan is a mountain summit in the Bitterroot Range of Montana. The peak is located in the Selway-Bitterroot Wilderness on land managed by the Bitterroot National Forest. The summit lies 12 miles west of the town of Darby, Montana, and three miles east of the Idaho–Montana border. The highest point of the Central Bitterroot Range is line parent Trapper Peak, 9.3 miles south-southeast.

== Climate ==
Based on the Köppen climate classification, the peak is located in a subarctic climate zone characterized by long, usually very cold winters, and mild summers. Winter temperatures can drop below −10 °F with wind chill factors below −30 °F.

Climate data for El Capitan (MT) 46.0083 N, 114.3974 W, Elevation: 9,236 ft (2,815 m) (1991–2020 normals)
Month	Jan	Feb	Mar	Apr	May	Jun	Jul	Aug	Sep	Oct	Nov	Dec	Year
Mean daily maximum °F (°C)	24.0 (−4.4)	23.8 (−4.6)	28.4 (−2.0)	34.0 (1.1)	43.3 (6.3)	52.1 (11.2)	64.0 (17.8)	64.0 (17.8)	54.6 (12.6)	40.7 (4.8)	28.3 (−2.1)	22.7 (−5.2)	40.0 (4.4)
Daily mean °F (°C)	17.5 (−8.1)	16.0 (−8.9)	19.3 (−7.1)	23.9 (−4.5)	32.6 (0.3)	40.5 (4.7)	51.0 (10.6)	50.9 (10.5)	42.4 (5.8)	31.0 (−0.6)	21.7 (−5.7)	16.4 (−8.7)	30.3 (−1.0)
Mean daily minimum °F (°C)	10.9 (−11.7)	8.3 (−13.2)	10.2 (−12.1)	13.9 (−10.1)	21.8 (−5.7)	29.0 (−1.7)	37.9 (3.3)	37.7 (3.2)	30.3 (−0.9)	21.2 (−6.0)	15.0 (−9.4)	10.1 (−12.2)	20.5 (−6.4)
Average precipitation inches (mm)	9.25 (235)	8.91 (226)	7.75 (197)	6.96 (177)	5.53 (140)	5.63 (143)	2.22 (56)	1.76 (45)	3.39 (86)	5.91 (150)	9.63 (245)	9.92 (252)	76.86 (1,952)
Source: PRISM Climate Group

== Gallery ==
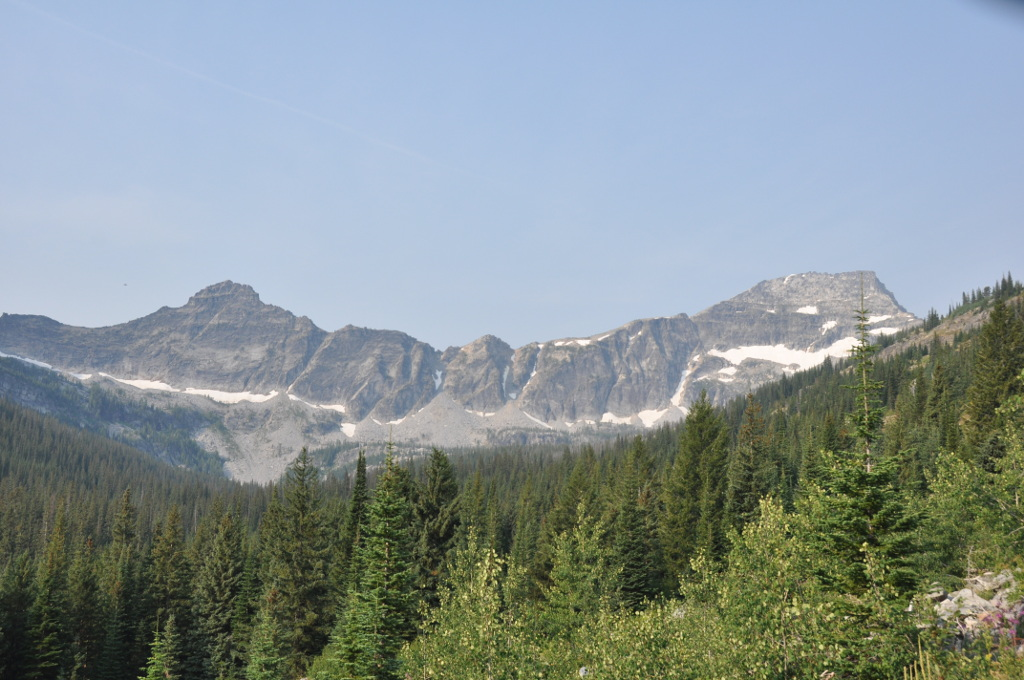
The Lonesome Bachelor (left) and El Capitan (right)

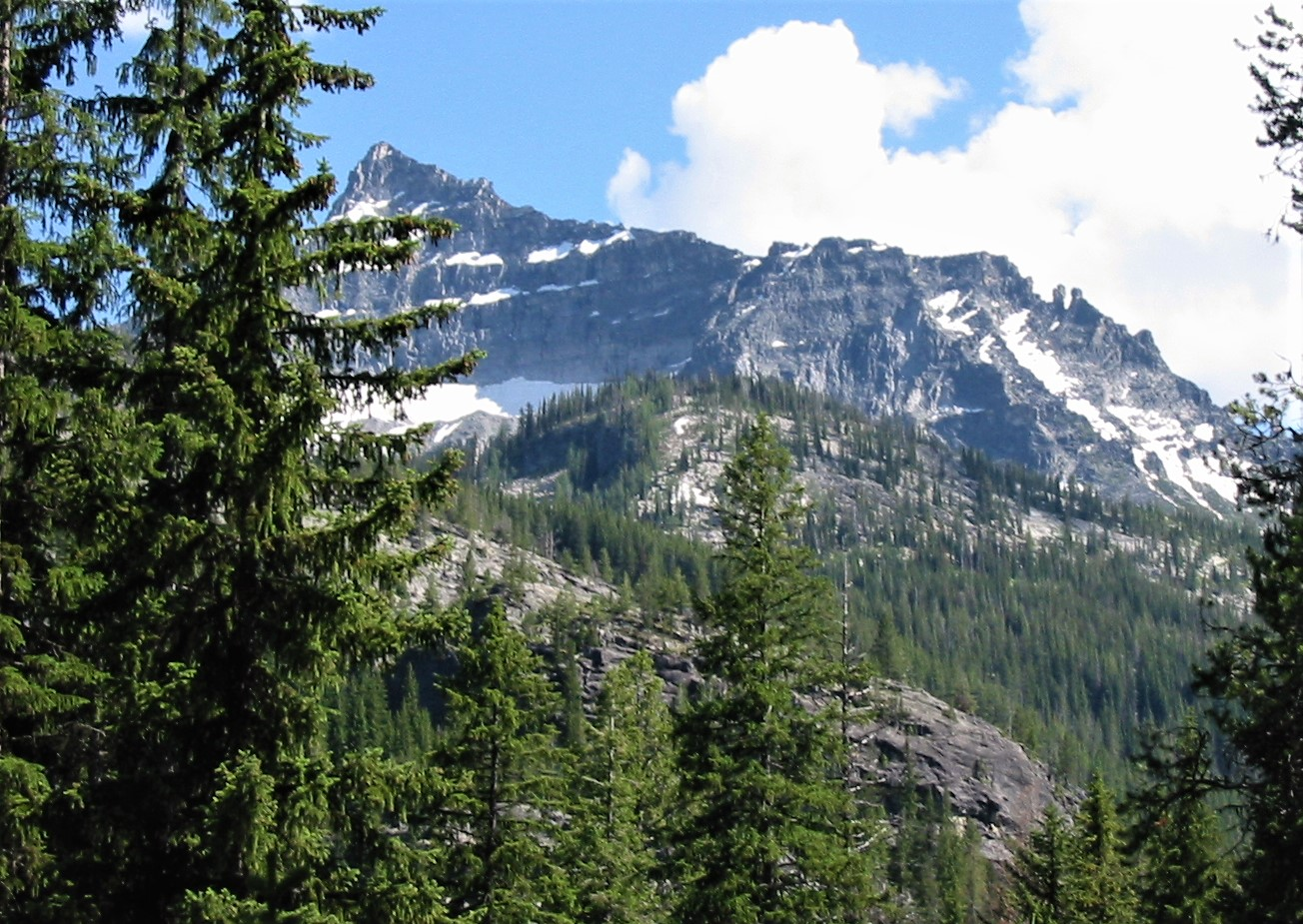
North face of El Capitan
