= Como Dam =

Lake Como
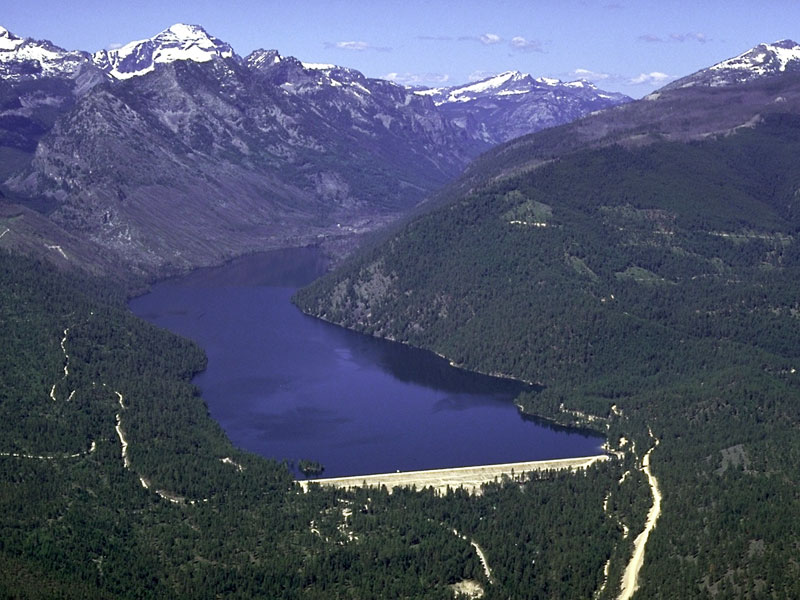
- Como Dam and Reservoir

- Location within Montana Location within the United States
- Location: Ravalli County, Montana, United States
- Coordinates: 46°03′16″N 114°15′40″W
- Type: Reservoir
- Primary inflows: Rock Creek, Little Rock Creek
- Primary outflows: Rock Creek
- Catchment area: 56.4 sq mi (146 km^{2})
- Basin countries: United States
- Max. length: 3 mi (4.8 km)
- Max. width: 3,200 ft (980 m)
- Surface area: 1.4 mi^{2} (3.6 km^{2})
- Water volume: 38,500 acre-feet (47,500,000 m^{3})
- Surface elevation: 4,252 feet (1,296 m)

Como Dam (National Inventory of Dams ID MT00564) is a dam in Ravalli County, Montana, in the far western part of the state.

Como Dam was originally constructed by local farmers around 1910, to impound a natural lake for irrigation storage; the United States Bureau of Reclamation enhanced and stabilized that structure in 1954, in 1976, and in 1992-1993. The dam is 85 feet (26 m) high, with a length of 2,550 feet (780 m) at its crest. As part of the larger Bitter Root Project, the dam and reservoir are both owned by the local Bitter Root Project Irrigation District.

The reservoir it creates, Lake Como, has a water surface of 1.4 square miles (3.6 km^{2}) and normal storage of 38,495 acre-feet (47,483,000 m^{3}). Recreation includes fishing, camping, and boating. The site is surrounded by the Bitterroot National Forest.

Concerns that the lack of an Early Warning System on the dam could lead to catastrophic loss of life in the Bitterroot Valley in the event of nighttime inundation led officials to take measures to ensure the safety of the dam in 2017.
