= Saint Mary Peak =

Mountain in Montana, United States

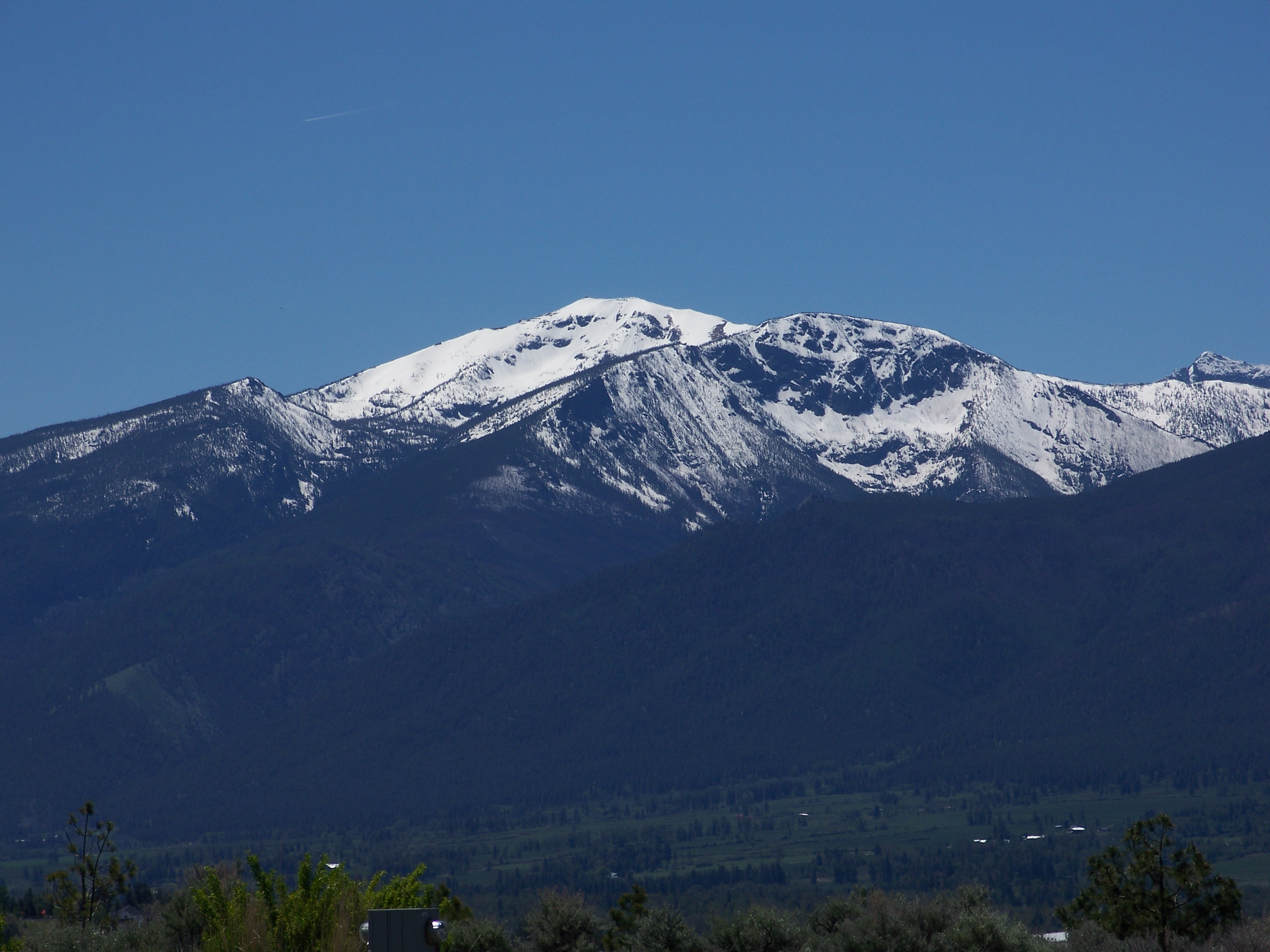
- Northeast aspect

Highest point
- Elevation: 9,351 ft (2,850 m)
- Prominence: 1,991 ft (607 m)
- Parent peak: Saint Joseph Peak (9,587 ft)
- Isolation: 6.23 mi (10.03 km)
- Coordinates: 46°30′43″N 114°14′37″W

Geography
- Location within Montana Location within the United States
- Location: Ravalli County, Montana, US
- Parent range: Rocky Mountains; Bitterroot Range
- Topo map: USGS Saint Mary Peak

Climbing
- Easiest route: class 1 hiking trail

Saint Mary Peak is a 9,351-foot elevation (2,850 m) mountain summit located in Ravalli County, Montana.

== Description ==
Saint Mary Peak is located in the Bitterroot Range, which is a subset of the Rocky Mountains. It is situated eight miles west of Stevensville in the Selway–Bitterroot Wilderness, on land managed by Bitterroot National Forest. The summit lies five miles east of the Idaho–Montana border. Precipitation runoff from the mountain drains into tributaries of the Bitterroot River. Topographic relief is significant as the summit rises over 5,000 feet (1,500 meters) above Big Creek in three miles. A popular 3.5-mile hiking trail leads to a fire lookout tower at the summit. The lookout was originally built in 1931 and reconstructed in 1953, and was placed on the National Register of Historic Places in 2018. This landform's toponym has been officially adopted by the United States Board on Geographic Names.

== Climate ==
Based on the Köppen climate classification, Saint Mary Peak is located in a subarctic climate zone characterized by long, usually very cold winters, and mild summers. Winter temperatures can drop below −10 °F with wind chill factors below −30 °F.

== Gallery ==
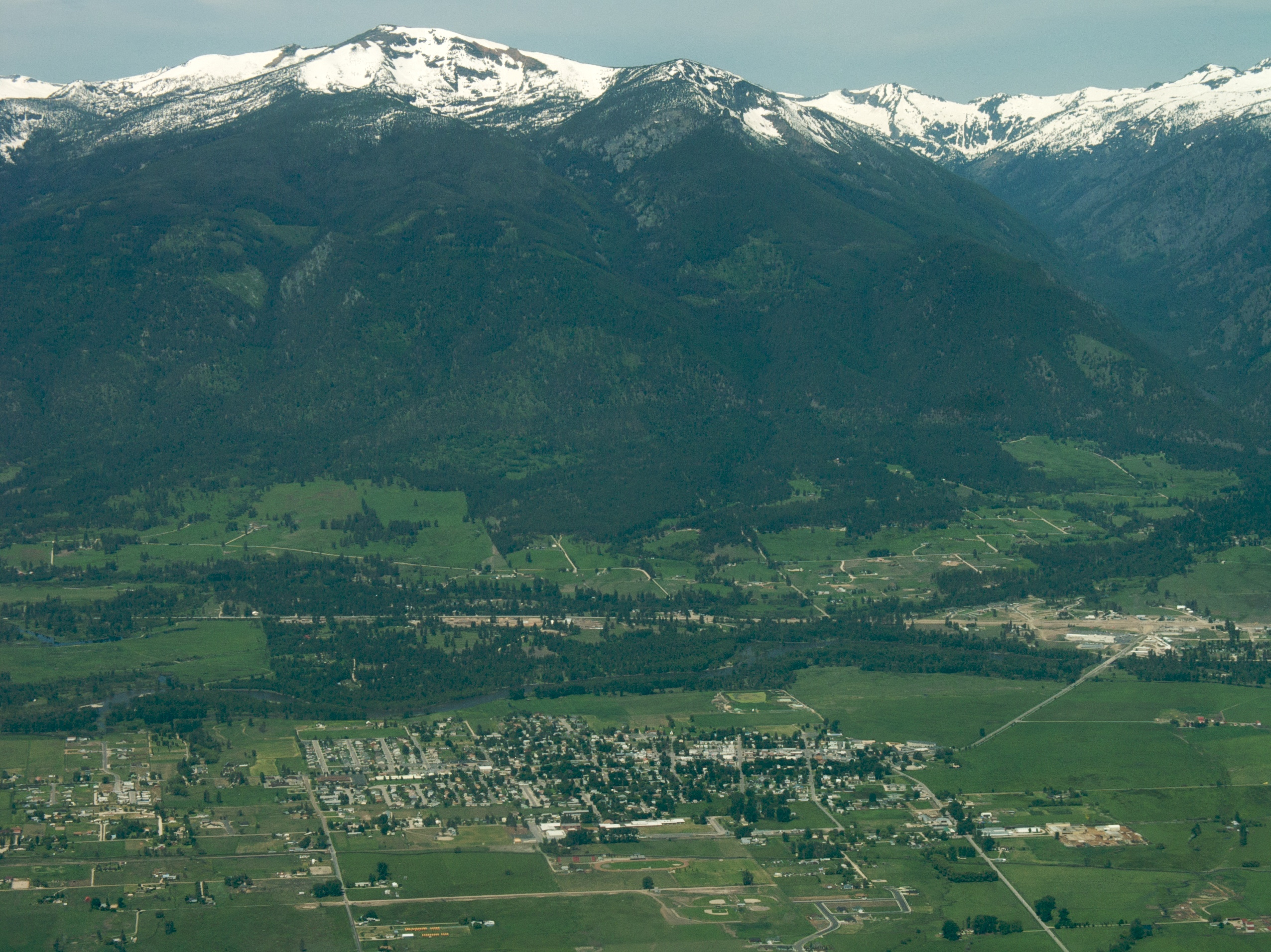
Saint Mary Peak rises above Stevensville, Montana

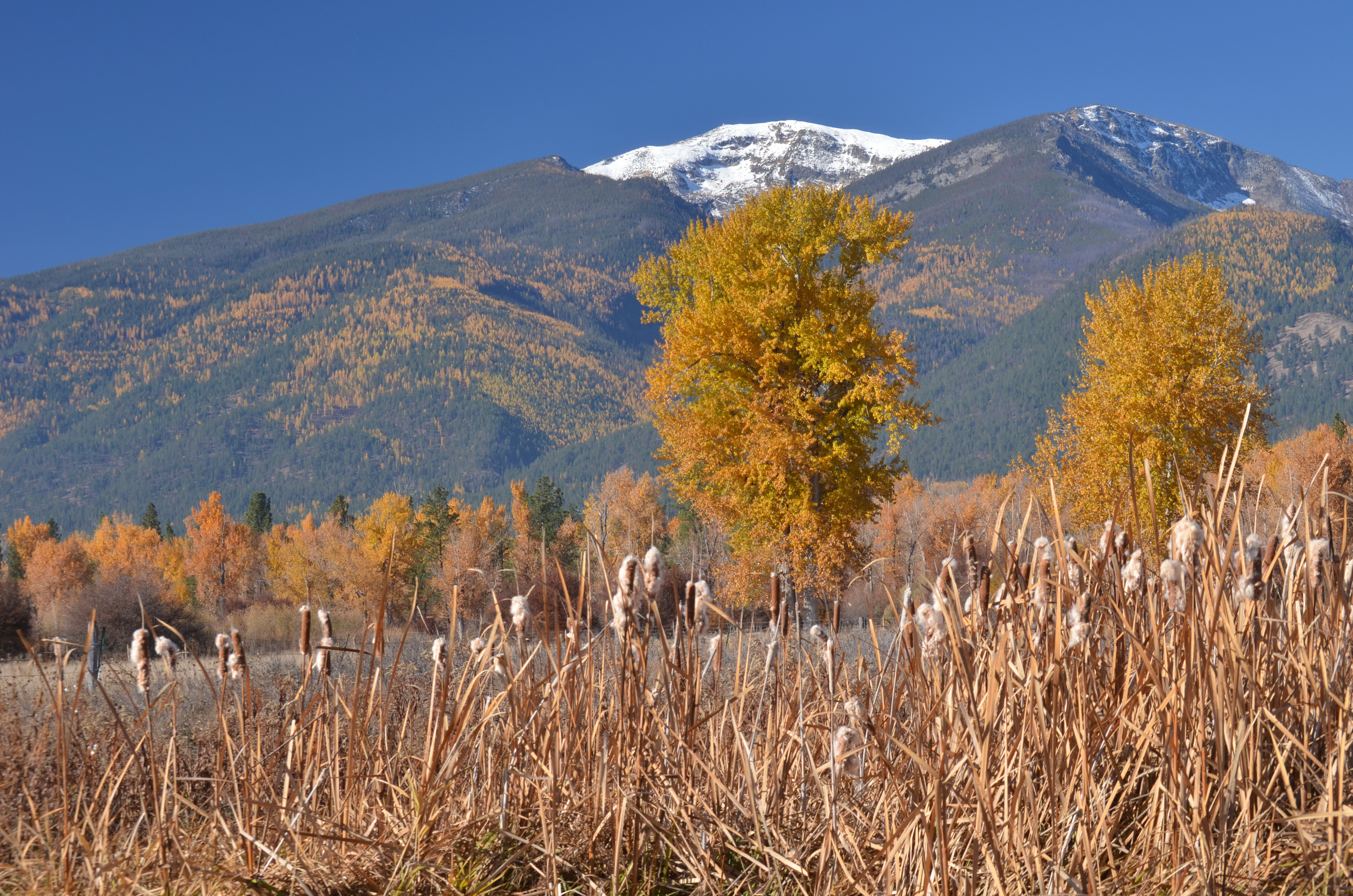
Saint Mary Peak

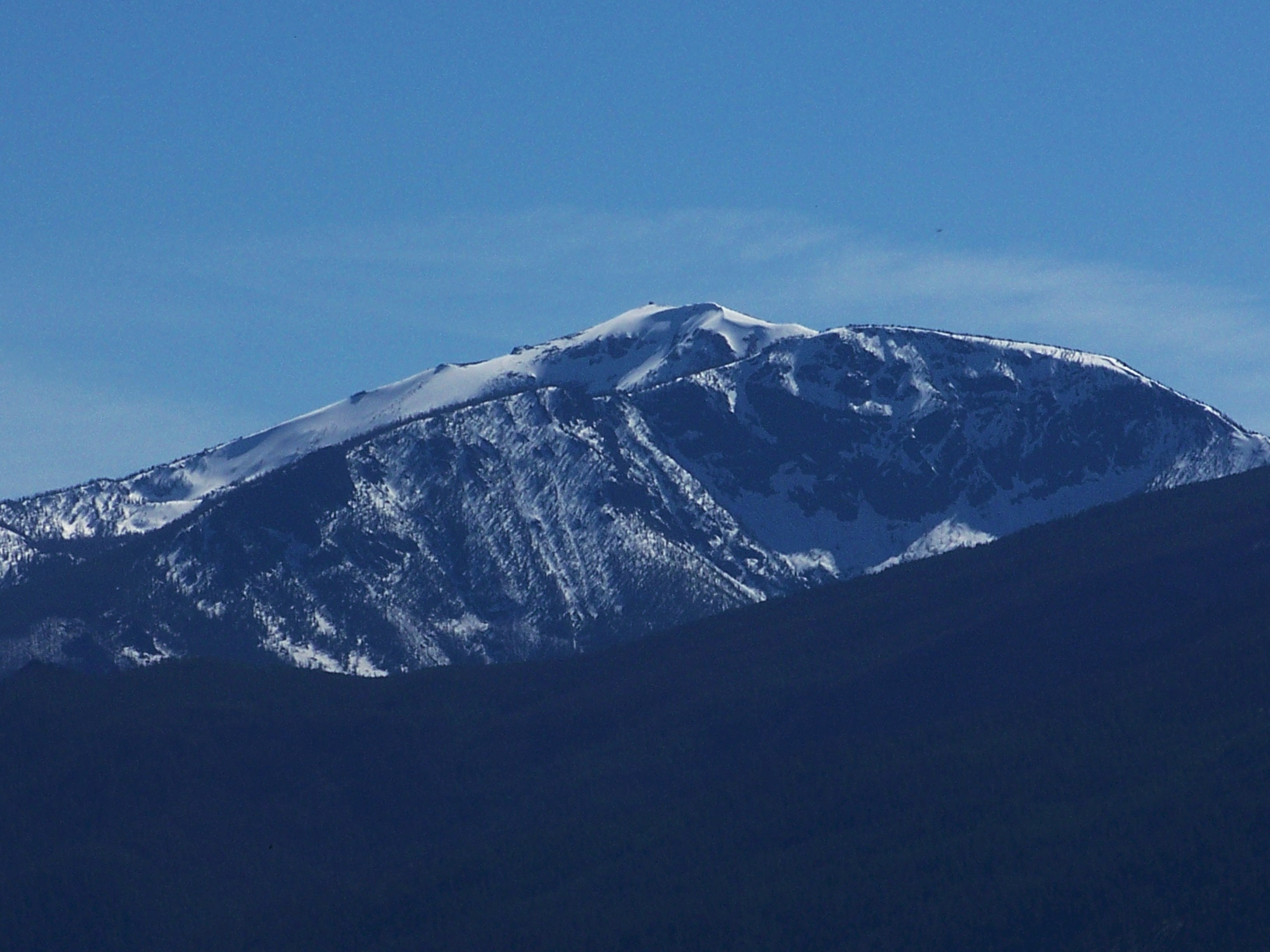
Saint Mary Peak

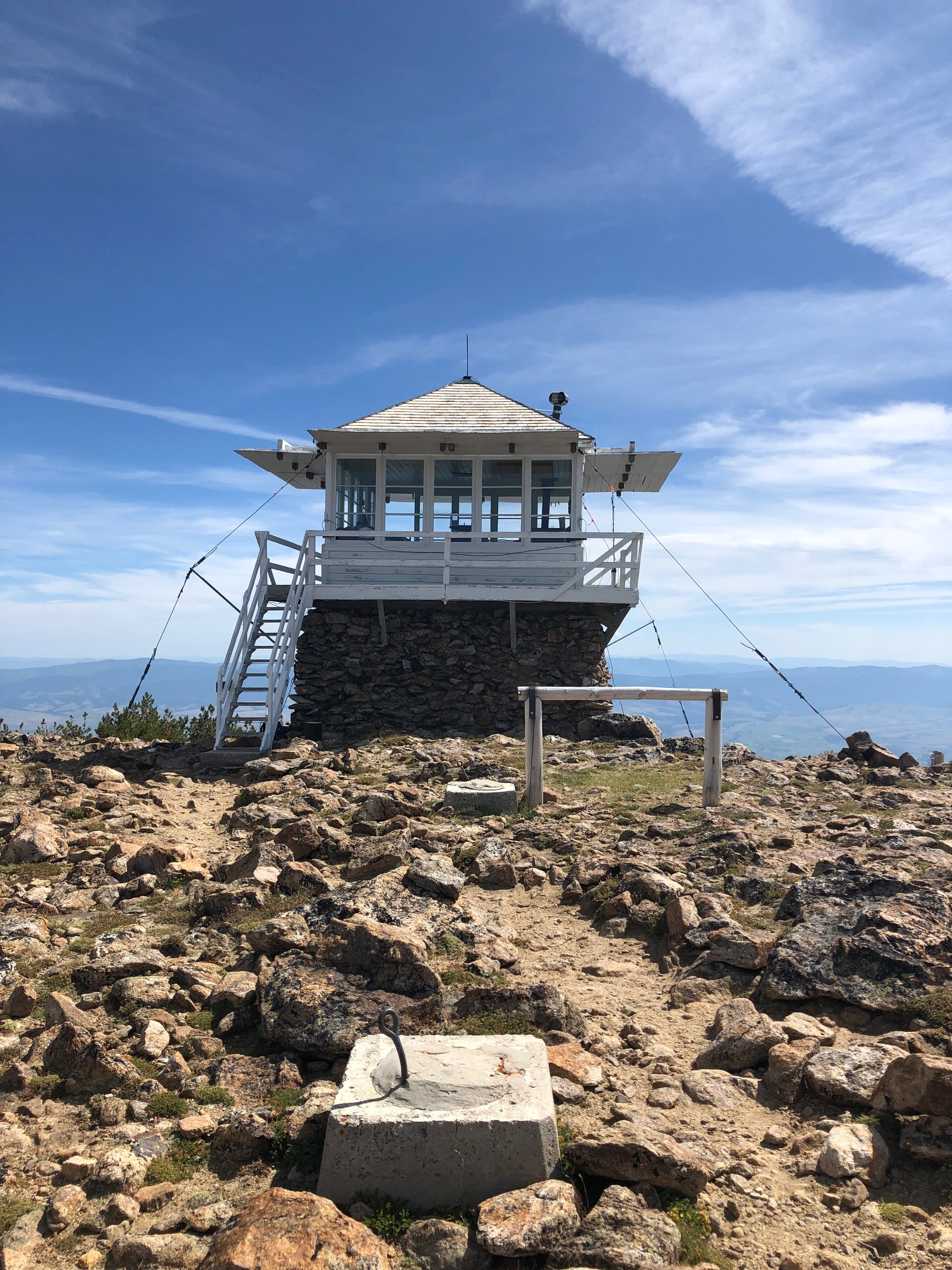
Saint Mary Peak fire lookout tower

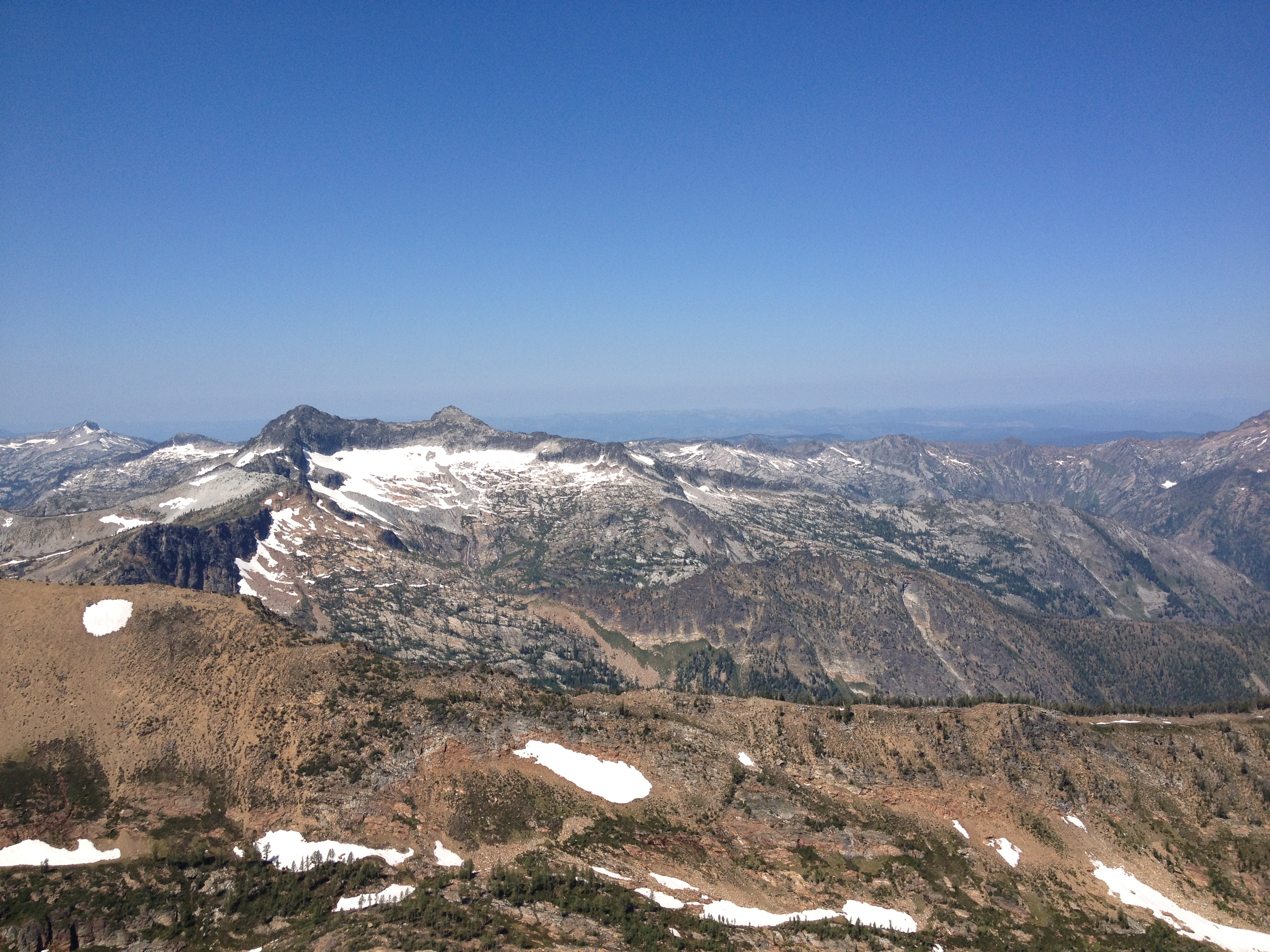
View from summit looking west to Heavenly Twins

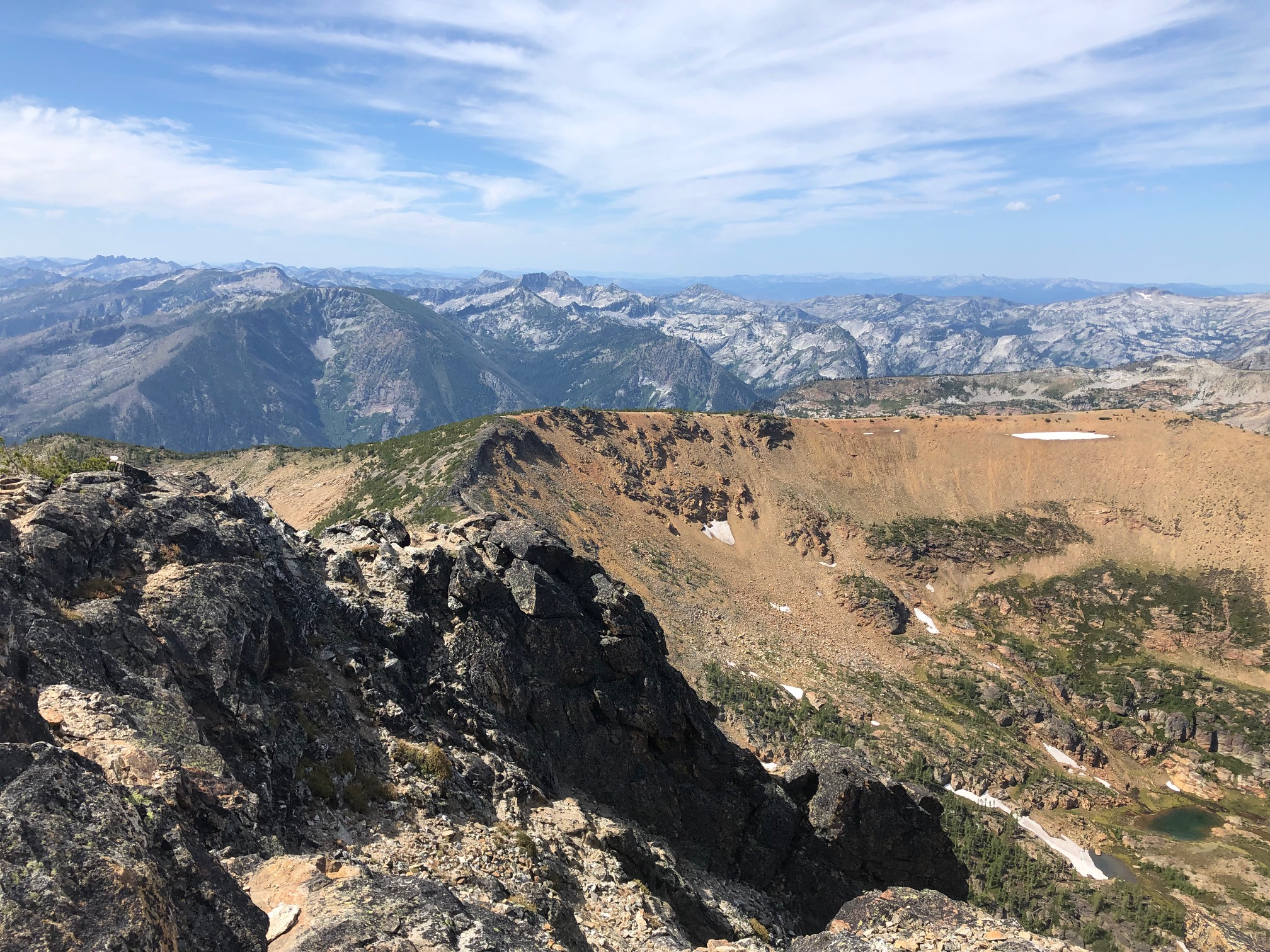
Summit view

== See also ==
- Geology of the Rocky Mountains
- National Register of Historic Places listings in Ravalli County, Montana
