= Guy M. Brandborg =

American forester (1893–1977)

Guy M. Brandborg (1893–1977) was supervisor of Bitterroot National Forest in Montana from 1935 to 1955 and later became a conservation activist. His campaigns were instrumental in passing the National Forest Management Act of 1976, the most significant policy affecting forestry practices on public lands since the founding of the National Forest Service.

== Early life ==
Born in 1893 to a Minnesotan farmer, Guy M. Brandborg began working for the National Forest Service in the summer of 1914 as a seasonal ranger in the Lewis and Clark National Forest. He studied forestry at the ranger training program at The State University of Montana in Missoula, which later changed its name to The University of Montana. Brandborg married Edna Stevenson in 1924.

== Career ==
Brandborg oversaw Crow Creek ranger district in central Montana and was soon promoted to assistant supervisor of the Helena National Forest. In 1924, he took a similar position on the Nezperce National Forest in Idaho. Brandborg became supervisor of the Bitterroot National Forest in 1935. During his tenure, he championed the sustainable harvest of timber on public land. He orchestrated an exchange in which the Forest Service acquired thirty-two thousand acres of clear-cut land from the Anaconda Company in exchange for rights to sustainably harvest timber from national forest land. Under Brandborg's timber management plan, only mature trees that had passed their fastest point of growth were cut. Younger trees were allowed to remain.

After World War II, to meet increased demands for timber, the Forest Service changed its management outlook from that of caretaker to that of lumber producer. A believer in sustainable practices, Brandborg was alarmed at the increased rate of forest cutting. His management goal was to balance production with conservation so that both forests and jobs would be conserved, and, in his judgment, the Forest Service practices were too exploitative to preserve either for future generations. Brandborg also opposed the Forest Service’s plan to ship logs to mills outside of the immediate area; he preferred to keep those jobs within the local community. He attempted to continue with his own management practices and keep the status quo, but that stance was not favored by the Forest Service, and in 1955 Brandborg retired from his position.

== Activism ==
As the Forest Service increased timber harvest, including clearcutting, in the Bitterroots, many in the local community became concerned about the aesthetic and environmental impacts. They turned to Brandborg for help. In what is known as the “Bitterroot Controversy”, he and others challenged the Forest Service through the Bitterroot Resource Conservation and Development program. Under this pressure, the Forest Service responded by contracting a third party—the School of Forestry at the University of Montana—to study the problem. The resulting report found that timber production in the Bitterroots was taking place without consideration of the effects on environment, economy, and aesthetics of the area. It also took a close look at the problems that stem from clear cutting and from forestry management decisions that lack local participation. Although disputes over forestry practices continue, this event sparked major changes to U.S. forestry policies in the 1970s and influenced the passage of the National Forest Management Act of 1976.

Brandborg led several campaigns to change forestry practices during his lifetime. He died in 1977.
