= Quartzite Mountain =

Mountain in Nevada, United States

Coordinates: 37°30′50″N 116°19′24″W

Quartzite Mountain is a summit in the U.S. state of Nevada. The elevation is 7,762 feet (2,366 m).

Quartzite Mountain was named for nearby quartzite deposits.
