= Trapper Peak (Montana) =

Mountain in the United States

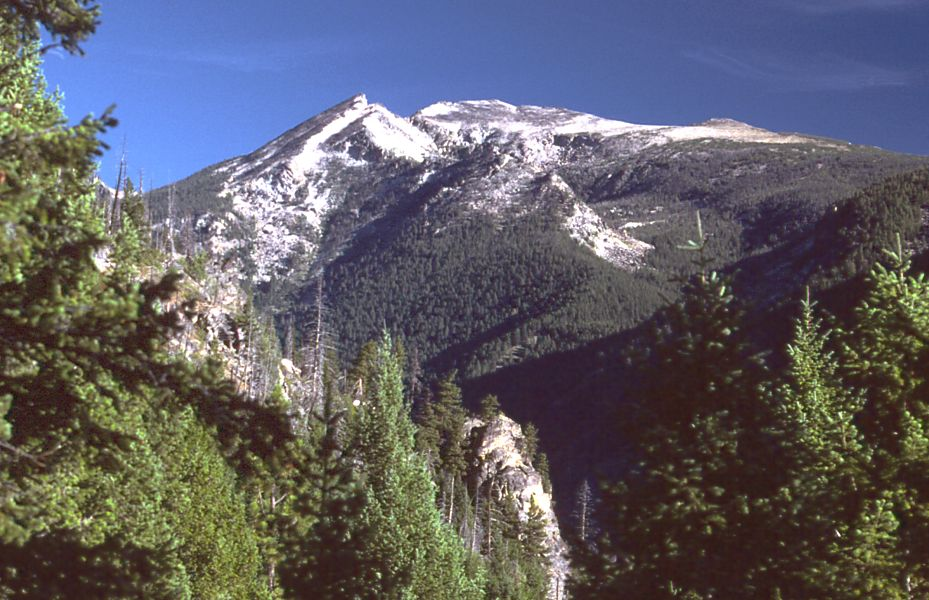
- Trapper Peak, as seen from the Boulder Point Lookout

Highest point
- Elevation: 10,157 ft (3,096 m)
- Prominence: 3,570 ft (1,090 m)
- Coordinates: 45°53′24″N 114°17′51″W

Geography
- Location within Montana
- Location: Ravalli County, Montana, U.S.
- Parent range: Bitterroot Mountains
- Topo map(s): USGS Trapper Peak, MT

Climbing
- Easiest route: Hike

Trapper Peak is the highest point in the Bitterroot Mountains, part of the larger Bitterroot Range in western Montana. It rises over 6,000 feet (1,830 m) above the nearby Bitterroot Valley.

The peak is located within the Central Bitterroot Range, a subrange of the Bitterroot Mountains and within the Selway-Bitterroot Wilderness Area of the Bitterroot National Forest.

A trail to the peak climbs 3,800 feet (1,160 m) from the end of a Forest Service road.

== Climate ==
Climate data for Trapper Peak (MT) 45.8929 N, 114.2924 W, Elevation: 9,226 ft (2,812 m) (1991–2020 normals)
| Month | Jan | Feb | Mar | Apr | May | Jun | Jul | Aug | Sep | Oct | Nov | Dec | Year |
|---|---|---|---|---|---|---|---|---|---|---|---|---|---|
| Mean daily maximum °F (°C) | 24.2 (−4.3) | 23.9 (−4.5) | 28.2 (−2.1) | 34.0 (1.1) | 43.4 (6.3) | 52.2 (11.2) | 64.2 (17.9) | 64.1 (17.8) | 54.7 (12.6) | 40.8 (4.9) | 28.5 (−1.9) | 23.0 (−5.0) | 40.1 (4.5) |
| Daily mean °F (°C) | 17.6 (−8.0) | 16.1 (−8.8) | 19.1 (−7.2) | 23.7 (−4.6) | 32.3 (0.2) | 40.3 (4.6) | 50.6 (10.3) | 50.6 (10.3) | 42.2 (5.7) | 30.9 (−0.6) | 21.7 (−5.7) | 16.6 (−8.6) | 30.1 (−1.0) |
| Mean daily minimum °F (°C) | 11.0 (−11.7) | 8.3 (−13.2) | 10.1 (−12.2) | 13.5 (−10.3) | 21.3 (−5.9) | 28.5 (−1.9) | 37.1 (2.8) | 37.0 (2.8) | 29.7 (−1.3) | 21.1 (−6.1) | 15.0 (−9.4) | 10.3 (−12.1) | 20.2 (−6.5) |
| Average precipitation inches (mm) | 6.48 (165) | 5.49 (139) | 5.28 (134) | 5.89 (150) | 4.94 (125) | 4.77 (121) | 2.02 (51) | 1.81 (46) | 2.35 (60) | 4.06 (103) | 6.60 (168) | 6.79 (172) | 56.48 (1,434) |
Source: PRISM Climate Group
