= Bare Hill =

Mountain in Koah, Australia

Coordinates: 16.985°S 145.5917°E

Bare Hill is a mountain in the locality of Koah in the Shire of Mareeba in North Queensland, Australia. It is located in the Bare Hill Conservation Park and is noted for its significant Aboriginal rock art. Bare Hill rises to 841 metres (2,759 ft) above sea level.

The rock art site at Bare Hill is at least 3500 years old according to scientists at James Cook University. It is part of the traditional lands of the Bulwai people who lived i the open forest area to the west, around Clohesy River, the Davies Creek and Emerald Creek. The rock art depicts the legend of Ganandoran who was badly burned by two women and he came to the site to die, so the Bulwai women decided to give birth at this rock.
