= James Edward Wood =

American murderer, serial rapist, and suspected serial killer

- Born: James Godwin; December 9, 1947; Pensacola, Florida, U.S.
- Died: February 1, 2004 (aged 56); Idaho Maximum Security Institution, Kuna, Idaho, U.S.
- Convictions: First degree murder x1 Rape x3
- Penalty: Death

Details
- Victims: 1–4+
- Span of crimes: 1976–1993
- Country: United States
- States: Idaho (possibly Louisiana)
- Date apprehended: July 7, 1993

James Edward Wood (born James Godwin; December 9, 1947 – February 1, 2004) was an American murderer, serial rapist and self-confessed serial killer. A violent sex offender with an extensive criminal record, Wood was convicted and sentenced to death for the June 1993 murder of 11-year-old Jeralee Underwood in Pocatello, Idaho; following his arrest, he was investigated for several murders committed while living in Louisiana, none of which were definitively linked to him. He died at the Idaho Maximum Security Institution in 2004.

== Early life ==
James Edward Wood was born James Godwin on December 9, 1947, in Pensacola, Florida. At the time of his birth, Godwin's father Sherman, an alcoholic, was imprisoned in Fort Leavenworth, prompting his mother, Hazel Johnson, to leave the state with the two boys and move to Idaho. His childhood was apparently normal until 1955, when the 8-year-old witnessed the tragic death of his mother, who perished in a fire while saving two other workers at a potato warehouse in Rupert. Godwin later claimed that in his distress, he had tried to put his arms around the waist of a nearby woman, who, instead of consoling him, simply pushed him away. This act caused him to develop a hatred towards women, which was greatly aggravated whenever they resembled the woman who had brushed him off.

Shortly after the tragedy, he was adopted by his aunt and uncle in Idaho Falls, who changed his name to James Edward Wood. During this time period, Wood claimed to have been abused both physically and mentally, which caused him to lash out frequently. Unable to control him, his adoptive parents sent him to the Idaho Youth Training Center in St. Anthony, from where Wood attempted to escape on eight occasions but was always caught and returned. In 1963, his father was released from prison and offered to take care of him, with Wood readily accepting and boarding the first bus to Shreveport, Louisiana, where Sherman had moved to. They lived together for some time until Wood moved to Missouri to enter flight school, marrying a woman there in 1966. However, he claimed that shortly after his marriage, he began raping women in Missouri and Illinois.

== Crimes ==
In 1967, Wood moved to his brother's house in Bossier City. That same year, he was arrested for breaking into an apartment, where he stabbed two women and attempted to rape one of them. He was arrested and lodged at the Bossier Parish Jail to await charges on aggravated battery. While in there, he suffered severe burns following an incident in which he stole his cellmate's blanket; in response, the man threw a cup of burning lighter fluid on him. Wood would eventually be convicted of the charges and sentenced to 10 years imprisonment at the Louisiana State Penitentiary, but would be paroled on August 18, 1971, for good behavior.

After his release, Wood took on a job as a truck driver, travelling cross-country. During the late 1970s, he and his brother committed various robberies across Louisiana, Texas and Arkansas. In 1977, he was arrested for robbing a pizzeria in Baton Rouge, but was released on bail and moved back to the northern part of the state. He again took on a job as a truck driver for an oil company in Bossier City and married a Shreveport woman, but was soon arrested for raping a woman in Lincoln Parish. Wood was convicted of this crime and given a few years' imprisonment, remaining in prison until November 6, 1986, when he was released for good behavior.

After working again as a truck driver and for a short time on a tugboat in Southern Louisiana, he returned to Shreveport in 1987, where he married a woman named Yvonne and had a son in 1989. Between 1986 and 1992, he worked at an insulation company, a film laboratory and a welding shop, but no known crimes were linked to him during this period. Wood eventually moved to Grand Cane, but was forced to flee after a 14-year-old relative of his wife filed a complaint to the police, claiming that he had raped her at the photo lab where he worked. He headed for Idaho, where he had some relatives, but on the way, he passed through a suburb in St. Louis, Missouri, where he kidnapped 18-year-old Jamie Masengill in October 1992. Wood drove her to the nearby forest, where he raped and shot her in the head; miraculously, Masengill survived. Wood eventually arrived in Idaho on November 1, moving in with a cousin in Chubbuck.

== Murder of Jeralee Underwood ==
On June 29, 1993, Wood lured 11-year-old newspaper carrier Jeralee Underwood in his car, while she was going on her daily route in Pocatello. Once she entered the car, he kidnapped her at gunpoint before shooting her in the head with a .22 caliber revolver the following day. He kept the body for over a week, repeatedly raping it, before finally dismembering the remains and dumping them in the Snake River. Eight days after her murder, residents searching the area found Underwood's remains.

On July 7, Wood was arrested by officer Scott Shaw. He offered no resistance, and readily admitted his guilt regarding Underwood's murder, as well as two other rapes and several robberies committed days after her murder. Due to the severity of the crime, a total of 12 charges were brought against him, including first-degree murder, kidnapping and the two rapes.

=== Confessions ===
A few months after his arrest, Wood suddenly admitted to another crime: the 1976 murder of 33-year-old Shirley Coleman. Coleman, an employee at the Western Electric Plant in Greenwood, Louisiana, was apparently abducted from a parking lot while she was doing her Christmas shopping. Her skeletal remains were found in a rural area west of Shreveport on January 7, 1981. In his confession, Wood claimed that he had driven her to the General Electric Industrial Plant, where he raped her in the back seat of her gold and beige Oldsmobile, before driving Coleman out in the woods and shooting her in the back of the head. Following his confession, authorities also started investigating him in relation to the 1979 disappearances of 18-year-old Dodie Gay and Arrilla Vaul, both of whom vanished within months of each other in Shreveport. While there were initial suspicions that these were simple boastful confessions akin to Henry Lee Lucas, investigators considered them credible enough to look into Wood further. In the end, however, he was never charged with any of these cases due to lack of physical evidence linking him to the crimes.

== Trial and sentence ==
During his September trial, Wood plead guilty to the Underwood murder, much to the displeasure of his lawyer. Subsequently, he was found guilty and sentenced to death. A few weeks after the sentence, he filed papers to waive all future appeals and speed up the execution process, but was later convinced by his new lawyers to reconsider. In the appeal that followed, attorneys Rolf Kehne and John Adams argued that their client's sentence should be overturned due to ineffective counsel. This stemmed from the claim that the previous lawyer, Monte Whittier, had convinced Wood, a Mormon in the same congregation as him, that he could be forgiven through blood atonement. Justice Lynn Winmill denied the request, as in his view, while Whittier's conduct was indeed flawed, it was not severe enough to affect Wood's decision.

== Death ==
For the remainder of his life, Wood was housed on death row at the Idaho Maximum Security Institution in Kuna. He died from suspected natural causes on February 1, 2004, after complaining about breathing problems earlier in the day.

== See also ==
- List of serial rapists
- Capital punishment in Idaho

== Bibliography ==
- Terry Adams, Mary Brooks-Mueller and Scott Shaw (December 1, 1998). Eye of the Beast: The True Story of Serial Killer James Wood. Addicus Books. ISBN 1886039321.
