= 2022 Idaho student murders =

Quadruple stabbing in Moscow, Idaho, U.S.

Coordinates: 46°43′19″N 117°00′39″W

- Mogen (top), Goncalves, Chapin, and Kernodle
- Locations of interest in murder investigation Area around the University of Idaho in Moscow
- Location: Moscow, Idaho, U.S.
- Date: November 13, 2022 (4 years ago); 4:00 a.m. – 4:25 a.m. (PST (UTC−8))
- Attack type: Mass stabbing; Mass murder
- Weapon: Military-style Ka-Bar knife
- Deaths: 4
- Victims: Madison May Mogen; Kaylee Jade Goncalves; Xana Alexia Kernodle; Ethan James Chapin
- Perpetrator: Bryan Kohberger
- Motive: Unknown
- Verdict: Pled guilty
- Convictions: First-degree murder (×4); Felony burglary (×1)
- Sentence: Four consecutive life sentences without the possibility of parole plus 10 years, and fines and restitution totaling $270,000
- Judge: Steven Hippler

Location in the United States
Location in Idaho

In the early morning hours of November 13, 2022, four University of Idaho students—Madison Mogen, Kaylee Goncalves, Ethan Chapin, and Xana Kernodle—were fatally stabbed in an off-campus house in Moscow, Idaho. On December 30, authorities arrested 28-year-old Bryan Christopher Kohberger in Monroe County, Pennsylvania, on four counts of first-degree murder and one count of felony burglary. At the time of the murders, Kohberger was a PhD student completing his first semester at Washington State University in Pullman, Washington, located fewer than eight miles (13 km) west of Moscow.

Investigators recovered a leather knife sheath on a bed next to one of the victims, which yielded touch DNA matching a single male profile. Surveillance footage collected from surrounding neighborhoods showed a white Hyundai Elantra traveling near the victims' residence multiple times during the estimated timeframe of the attack; meanwhile, an analysis of cellular network records indicated that a mobile device associated with Kohberger was registered in the vicinity of the victims' residence at least twelve times in the months preceding the attacks, although its signal was absent during the hours surrounding the slayings. Investigators also used investigative genetic genealogy to link the DNA profile extracted from the knife sheath to public genealogical databases, leading authorities to target Kohberger as the primary suspect.

Prosecutors initially sought the death penalty. On July 2, 2025, Kohberger entered a guilty plea to all charges against him as part of a deal to avoid the death penalty. Three weeks later, he was sentenced to four consecutive terms of life imprisonment in prison without the possibility of parole, plus ten years for burglary.

== Background ==
During the fall 2022 semester, five female University of Idaho students lived in a rented off-campus residence in the rural college town of Moscow, Idaho. The town of Moscow had not had a murder since 2015. The three-story house had six bedrooms, two on each floor. Built on a hillside, the house had entrances on both the first and second floors.

Kaylee Goncalves and Madison Mogen had their bedrooms on the third floor. On the night of the murders, Mogen and Goncalves slept in Mogen's room. The second floor had the house's kitchen and the bedrooms of Xana Kernodle and surviving roommate Dylan Mortensen. At that time, Kernodle's boyfriend, Ethan Chapin, was staying at the house in her room. The first floor of the house had the bedroom of another surviving roommate, Bethany Funke.

Mogen and Goncalves both grew up in Coeur d'Alene, Idaho, and had been best friends since childhood. Mogen, age 21, was a senior majoring in marketing. She was a member of the Pi Beta Phi sorority and had a part-time job at the Mad Greek restaurant in Moscow. Goncalves, also 21, was a senior majoring in general studies and a member of the Alpha Phi sorority. She was set to graduate the following month, finishing her studies a semester early. She had already secured a job with an IT firm in Texas and was planning to move shortly after graduating.

Kernodle, age 20, grew up in Avondale, Arizona, and later lived in Post Falls, Idaho. She was a junior majoring in marketing. Like Mogen, she was a member of the Pi Beta Phi sorority and had a part-time job at the Mad Greek restaurant in Moscow. Chapin, age 20, grew up in Mount Vernon, Washington, and was a triplet close to his siblings and parents. He was a sophomore majoring in recreation, sport, and tourism management. Chapin was a member of the Sigma Chi fraternity.

== Murders ==
All five roommates and Chapin were in the house by 2:00 a.m. on November 13, 2022. Chapin and Kernodle had returned from an on-campus party at the nearby Sigma Chi fraternity, arriving home at 1:45 a.m. Mogen and Goncalves had gone to a downtown sports bar called Corner Club and then a food truck called Grub Truck, arriving home at 1:56 a.m. Between 2:26 to 2:52 a.m., the phones of Goncalves and Mogen made several unanswered calls to Goncalves' former long-time boyfriend, a fellow student.

Detectives believe all four murders occurred between 4:00 and 4:25 a.m. Kernodle appears to have been awake when the killer entered the house, as she had just received a DoorDash food order at around 4:00 a.m, and was using the TikTok app on her phone at 4:12 a.m. Surviving roommate Dylan Mortensen, who was asleep in her bedroom on the second floor, told investigators she was awakened by a noise on the third floor that she initially thought was Goncalves and her pet dog. She stated she later heard someone saying something to the effect of "There's someone here." Mortensen believed this was Goncalves, although investigators believe it may have been Kernodle.

Mortensen looked out her door but did not see anything. She stated she then heard what sounded like crying from Kernodle's room. She opened her door again and heard an unfamiliar male voice say, "It's okay; I'm going to help you." Security cameras near the house picked up the sound of whimpering, a loud thud, and a dog barking numerous times starting around 4:17 a.m. Mortensen opened her door a third time and saw a figure clad in black clothing and a mask that covered his mouth and nose walking toward her. The man, whom Mortensen stated she did not recognize, walked past her and exited through a sliding glass door in the kitchen. Mortensen stated she stood in a "frozen shock phase" and then locked herself in her room. She later told authorities she did not immediately call 911 after seeing a masked stranger in the house because she "was intoxicated and didn't want to believe what was going on".

At approximately 4:26 a.m., Mortensen went downstairs to join the other surviving roommate, Bethany Funke. On the way, Mortensen saw Kernodle lying on the floor of her bedroom. She later told police she believed at the time Kernodle may have been intoxicated.

The two surviving roommates then locked themselves in Funke's bedroom and spent several hours attempting to contact their other housemates. The following morning, they still had not heard anything from the others, and Mortensen called friends over for help. Soon after arriving, one of the friends went to the second floor where he discovered that Chapin and Kernodle had no pulses. He told the others to exit the home, and Funke called 911 at 11:55:42 a.m., requesting aid for an "unconscious person".

All four victims were pronounced dead at the home that afternoon. Kernodle and Chapin were discovered in her second-floor bedroom, with Kernodle lying on the floor and Chapin in bed. Mogen and Goncalves were found in the single bed in Mogen's room on the third floor. All four were stabbed to death. The victims were not gagged or restrained and none had been sexually assaulted. Goncalves had more than twenty stab wounds in addition to injuries "connected with asphyxiation and blunt force trauma". Kernodle had more than fifty stab wounds, many of them defensive wounds. Upon searching the residence, officers discovered Goncalves' dog — which she shared with her ex-boyfriend — unharmed on the third floor.

== Response ==
On the evening of November 13, the university canceled classes for November 14; it also scheduled a candlelight vigil on the UI administration building lawn for the evening of November 16, then postponed it for two weeks. From the day of the killings, investigators initially said there was no risk to the community. Three days later, however, Moscow police chief James Fry said: "We cannot say that there is no threat to the community."

Fall break was scheduled to begin after November 18, with classes resuming on November 28. Many students and Moscow residents, not trusting initial police assurances and fearing for their safety, began an early Thanksgiving holiday exodus from the area. Other residents who stayed were anxious and cautious, and some professors canceled their classes. Due to weather concerns, the candlelight vigil was moved indoors to the Kibbie Dome and held on the evening of November 30.

The fathers of Goncalves and Chapin criticized the limited flow of information from police and the university to the victims' families. TikTokers, self-proclaimed psychics, and social media users began to speculate and spread rumors and misinformation about the case on social media. In response, the Moscow Police Department criticized the Internet sleuths for creating rampant online rumors and disrupting investigations, and in a December 2 news release stated: "There is speculation, without factual backing, stoking community fears and spreading false facts." Moscow police captain Roger Lanier said, "Tracking down rumors and quelling rumors about specific information and specific events that may not have happened is a huge distraction... We are not releasing specific details as we do not want to compromise the investigation." They also warned that "people harassing or threatening those potentially involved with the case could face criminal charges".

== Investigation ==
The Moscow Police Department (MPD) led the investigation of the stabbings with support from the Idaho State Police (ISP) and the Federal Bureau of Investigation (FBI). Nearly 130 law enforcement personnel worked on the case.

On November 19, Moscow police asked the public to provide any video of the house recorded the night of the killings. A phone tip line and email address were created through the FBI for the public to submit information. As of December 5, 2,600 emailed tips, 2,700 phone calls, and 1,000 digital media submissions were reportedly submitted to the tip lines. On December 24, investigators reported receiving over 15,000 tips regarding the case.

Police initially left open the possibility of multiple perpetrators. They stated that they believed it was "a targeted attack but have not concluded if the target was the residence or its occupants."

In a November 23 press conference, the Moscow police chief said authorities received a number of tips, including one indicating that Goncalves had a stalker, but could not verify that claim or identify any such individual by the time of the press conference. After receiving hundreds of tips from the public, on December 15 police announced they were searching records of approximately 22,000 fifth-generation Hyundai Elantras made between 2011 and 2013. A camera in the area captured video of a white or light-colored Elantra around the time of the murders, which investigators noticed made multiple passes along the same route near the residence. Another surveillance recording obtained by investigators also showed an Elantra passing the victims' home three times, beginning around 3:29 a.m. At 4:04 a.m., the Elantra returned for a fourth time. At 4:20 a.m., the car was seen speeding away from the victims' neighborhood.

Investigators in neighboring Pullman, Washington — a college town adjacent to Moscow — began investigating a white Elantra owned by 28-year-old PhD student and teaching assistant Bryan Christopher Kohberger, who drove it home to the Pocono Mountains of Pennsylvania for the holidays with his father. Kohberger's Elantra was of a later year than the original police description. In Indiana, Kohberger was pulled over twice in a nearly five-mile (8 km) radius by the state police on Interstate 70 outside Greenfield for following too close (tailgating); the FBI denied directing the state police to make the stops. Investigators obtained cell phone data showing that Kohberger's phone stopped connecting to the network in Pullman around 2:47 a.m. on November 13 before reconnecting around 4:48 a.m. near Blaine, Idaho, which is near U.S. Highway 95 south of Moscow. Cell phone data also showed that his phone connected to a cell tower near the victims' residence around 9:00 a.m., approximately five hours after the killings, and pinged from the tower nearest the residence at least twelve times between June 2022 and November 13.

Investigators found DNA on a tan leather knife sheath on Mogen's bed. The DNA had no matches in the national law enforcement database CODIS, and law enforcement decided to use genealogical DNA matching to identify a suspect. On November 22, investigators gave a DNA sample to forensic genealogy company Othram. The company began building potential trees, but the closest DNA match shared only 70.7 centimorgans of DNA with the suspect, a relationship equivalent to sharing a great-great-grandparent. Othram suggested contacting one of four brothers who were potential relatives in order to narrow the pool, but the potential relatives declined. On December 10, Othram was asked to stop its work, and the FBI took over the investigation.

Investigators at the FBI opted to use ancestral genealogical websites GEDmatch and MyHeritage, which the Bureau acknowledges included DNA samples of people who had not opted into law enforcement searches. This was done contrary to a Justice Department policy that investigators only use DNA samples from databases "that provide explicit notice to their service users and the public that law enforcement may use their service sites". The FBI identified a match with 250 shared centimorgans of DNA, a much closer relative. A few days later investigators began monitoring Kohberger's parents' home.

Before the arrest, investigators monitored Kohberger outside his parents' Pennsylvania home in Monroe County. He was seen multiple times wearing surgical gloves and placing trash bags inside a neighbor's garbage can; the items were sent to the Idaho State Lab for testing. Authorities also said Kohberger "cleaned his car, inside and outside, not missing an inch [of area]". According to authorities, a search of the home where Kohberger was arrested revealed a knife, a pistol, and a black face mask, as well as ID cards inside a glove in a box.

Kohberger was taken into custody by Pennsylvania State Police's Special Emergency Response Team and the FBI on December 30 at his parents' home; authorities found him in the kitchen dressed in a shirt and shorts, wearing examination gloves, and putting trash into separate zip-lock bags.

== Perpetrator ==
Bryan Christopher Kohberger was born on November 21, 1994 in Albrightsville, Pennsylvania. He grew up in the Pocono Mountains region with his two older sisters and attended Pleasant Valley High School in Brodheadsville, Pennsylvania.

Between 2009 and 2011, during his early adolescence, Kohberger wrote online that he faced mental health challenges, suffers from tinnitus, and has a condition called visual snow syndrome. He also experienced severe weight issues and social alienation. Prior to his senior year, Kohberger lost a significant amount of weight and underwent notable changes in his demeanor, according to former classmates. He briefly studied heating, ventilation, and air conditioning (HVAC) at the Monroe Career and Technical Institute before returning to general academic studies.

After graduating from Pleasant Valley High School in Brodheadsville, in 2013, he attended Monroe Career and Technical Institute in Bartonsville but dropped out a year later. In 2015, he began work as a security officer for the Pleasant Valley School District. Kohberger later attended Northampton Community College's campus in Tannersville, where he earned an associate degree in psychology in 2018. After graduating, Kohberger pursued studies in psychology and criminal justice in eastern Pennsylvania. He earned an Associate of Arts degree in psychology from Northampton Community College in 2018, followed by a Bachelor of Science degree in psychology from DeSales University in Center Valley in 2020 and a Master of Arts in criminal justice in June 2022. While at DeSales, Kohberger studied under forensic psychologist Katherine Ramsland, who specialized in offender profiling and serial crime.

In August 2022, Kohberger moved to Pullman, Washington, to begin a PhD program in criminology and criminal justice at Washington State University (WSU); its campus is less than eight miles (13 km) west of Moscow. He had completed his first semester there just nine days before his arrest. Kohberger had been a teaching assistant at WSU and, less than two weeks before the murders, faculty members met with him to discuss growing concerns and complaints about his behavior and conduct toward women. He was terminated from his teaching assistant role on December 19, in a decision based on his behavior and performance overall.

Kohberger's defense team alleged that he was diagnosed with autism spectrum disorder. However, the judge stated he had never seen any odd behavior from Kohberger during the hearings he had presided over in the last several months, noting Kohberger "by all accounts is highly-functioning", and that he would not allow a jury to hear testimony on an autism diagnosis unless Kohberger himself took the stand.

== Legal proceedings ==
=== Arrest and charges ===
On December 30, 2022, law enforcement officers executed an arrest warrant at the Albrightsville, Pennsylvania home of Kohberger's parents, where he had traveled for the university winter break. The arrest was carried out by the Pennsylvania State Police in coordination with the FBI. Search warrants executed at the location resulted in the seizure of personal electronics, clothing, and Kohberger's white Hyundai Elantra.

He was appointed a public defender, and was detained without bond at the Monroe County Correctional Facility in Stroudsburg, Pennsylvania. On his return to the county courthouse on January 3, 2023, Kohberger waived his right to extradition proceedings. The following day, he was extradited to Idaho, remanded to the Latah County jail in Moscow, and held without bail to face formal charges.

In January 2023, Kohberger made his first appearance in the Latah County Courthouse., where a grand jury indicted him on four counts of first-degree murder and one count of felony burglary, for breaking into a home with the intent to commit a felony. Prosecutors subsequently announced their intent to seek the death penalty.

One week later on January 12, Kohberger made his second appearance for a status conference in the same room at the courthouse.

On May 17, 2023, the Latah County District Court announced that Kohberger was indicted by a grand jury on five charges: four counts of first degree murder and one count of felony burglary. A preliminary probable cause hearing scheduled for June 26 was canceled after the indictment. In May 2023, Kohberger refused to enter a plea during his arraignment. At his arraignment, Kohberger chose to stand silent, prompting the presiding judge to enter a plea of not guilty on his behalf.

On June 26, 2023, the Latah County Prosecutor's office announced they were seeking the death penalty given the aggravating circumstances of the first-degree murder charges. Kohberger was denied bond. In January 2024, the judge granted the defense access under seal to the results of the investigative genetic genealogy testing, which used a "touch" sample from the knife sheath left behind at the crime scene that first led to the investigation of Kohberger.

=== Plea deal and sentencing ===
Defense counsel filed numerous pretrial motions, including requests to dismiss the indictment, suppress biological evidence, and challenge the use of investigative genetic genealogy. On September 9, 2024, the Idaho Supreme Court granted a defense motion for a change of venue, transferring the case to the Ada County District Court in Boise due to concerns regarding pretrial publicity in Latah County. Judge Steven Hippler, now presiding over the case, tentatively set the start date for jury selection as August 4, 2025, with the jury trial beginning on August 18.

Kohberger was flown south to Boise on September 15 and held at the Ada County jail. On July 2, 2025, Kohberger entered into a plea agreement with state prosecutors. Under the terms of the deal, Kohberger agreed to plead guilty to all five counts and waive his right to appeal in exchange for prosecutors withdrawing the death penalty.

On June 30, 2025, an announcement noted Kohberger agreed to plead guilty to all counts against him, accepting the sentence of four consecutive life sentences, avoiding the death penalty. Pending approval by the judge, Kohberger also gave up his right to any future appeals, guaranteeing that he will remain in prison until he dies. On July 2, Kohberger pleaded guilty to four counts of first-degree murder and one count of felony burglary. On July 23, 2025, he was sentenced to four consecutive life sentences in prison without the possibility of parole, in addition to a ten-year sentence for the burglary conviction. During the day-long sentencing hearing, family members of the four victims delivered impact statements confronting Kohberger, who offered no formal statement. He was also ordered to pay a combined fine of $250,000 ($50,000 per count) and $20,000 combined in restitution ($5,000 per victim). He is incarcerated at the Idaho Maximum Security Institution.

=== Petition for post-conviction relief ===
In July 2026, Kohberger filed a petition for post-conviction relief in Ada County District Court seeking to withdraw his guilty plea, claiming that he was innocent. In public statements provided to news media, Kohberger asserted his innocence and claimed that his former defense team coerced him into accepting the plea deal through misinformation and false promises. State officials and legal counsel representing the victims' families publicly affirmed their confidence in the original conviction and stated their readiness to challenge the petition in court.

On August 29, 2026, Kohberger asked the court to disqualify the judge in his case, Steven Hippler.

== Aftermath ==
On February 24, 2023, University of Idaho president C. Scott Green announced that the house where the killings occurred was donated to the university; it was demolished ten months later.

A memorial garden for the victims on the University of Idaho campus opened in 2024 as the Vandal Healing Garden. Scholarships in the name of Kernodle, Chapin, and Mogen have been created. The university awarded posthumous degrees to the four victims at its spring commencement ceremonies on May 13, 2023.

Shortly after Kohberger's arrest, Kerri Rawson, a victim's rights activist and the daughter of serial killer Dennis Rader aka BTK, said in an interview that learning of Kohberger's modus operandi "sank (her) stomach", recalling that she felt similarities between Kohberger's interest in criminology and her father's service in law enforcement. Her interviewer noted that complex criminals often develop an interest in or connection to criminology or criminal justice, citing examples like Joseph James DeAngelo and Ted Bundy.

On November 19, 2025, KOMO News reported that the Goncalves family was planning to sue Washington State University, seeking "accountability and transparency" due to Kohberger's conduct before the murders.

In January 2026, Kohberger's sister spoke publicly about the case for the first time since her brother's arrest and sentencing. According to interviews with major publications, she stated that the family had been shocked by his arrest and had no prior knowledge of his involvement in the murders.

== Media ==
In July 2025, Amazon Prime Video released the documentary series One Night in Idaho: The College Murders, covering the murders and the investigations leading to Kohberger's arrest.

In 2026, Netflix released The Idaho Murders: College Nightmare, a three-part documentary series also covering the murders and investigation, using bodycam footage, texts, and interviews with loved ones.

A 2025 film The Idaho College Killer is loosely based on the event.

== See also ==
- Richard Speck
- Gainesville Ripper
- Bandon massacre
- Florida State University Chi Omega murders
- Ma Jiajue incident, similar 2004 case in China where four university roommates were beaten to death in a campus residence
- List of mass stabbings by death toll
