= Thomas Eugene Creech =

American murderer (born 1950)

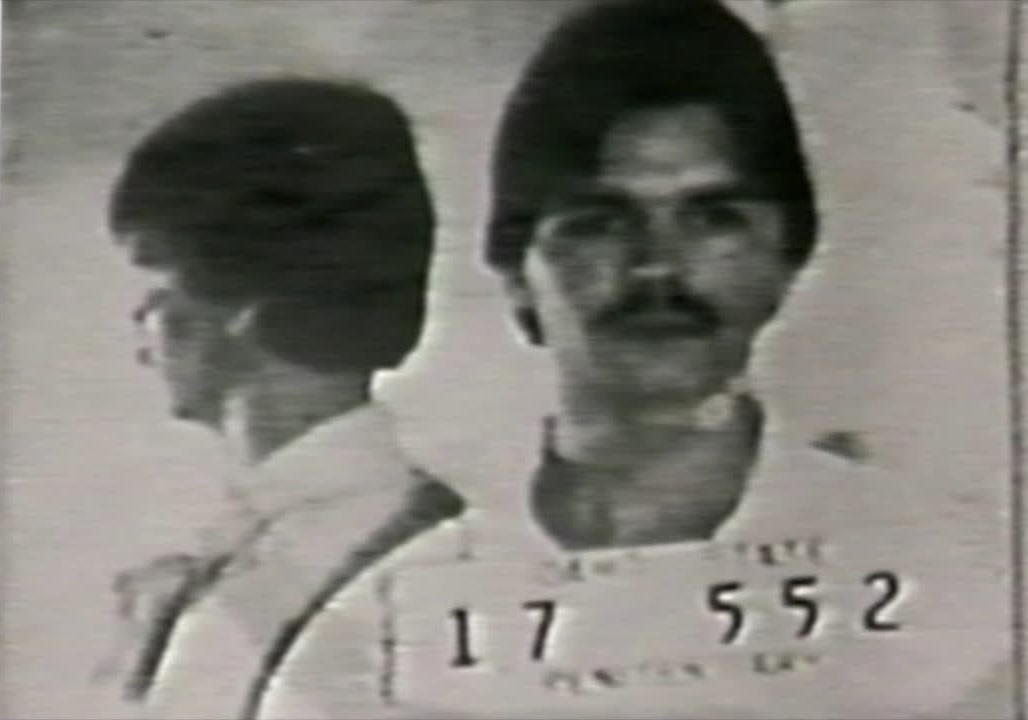
- Creech on the day of his arrest Nov 8, 1974.
- Born: September 9, 1950 (age 76); Hamilton, Ohio, U.S.
- Convictions: First degree murder (5 counts)
- Penalty: Death (Jensen); Death; commuted to life imprisonment x2 (Arnold-Bradford murders); Life imprisonment (Dean); Life imprisonment (Robinson)

Details
- Victims: 5 convicted, 11–43 suspected
- Span of crimes: 1974 (confirmed) – 1981 (confirmed)
- Country: United States
- States: California, Idaho and Oregon (confessed to or was linked but not charged in other states as well)
- Date apprehended: November 8, 1974; 52 years ago
- Imprisoned at: Idaho Maximum Security Institution, Kuna, Idaho

Thomas Eugene Creech (born September 9, 1950) is an American prisoner who was convicted of two murders committed in 1974 and sentenced to death in Idaho. The sentence was reduced two years later on appeal to life imprisonment. He was sent back to Idaho's death row for a 1981 murder committed while imprisoned. Creech personally confessed to a total of 42 murders in various states, some of which allegedly involved an unnamed biker gang trafficking drugs and the Church of Satan. Most of his additional confessions are uncorroborated, but police believe strong evidence links Creech to seven additional murder victims (in two of which he was convicted). In January 2024, an investigation by the San Bernardino County Sheriff's Department concluded that Creech murdered Daniel A. Walker (in what was a cold case).

As of 2024, Creech was the longest-serving death row inmate in the state. His execution, scheduled for February 28, 2024, resulted in a failed attempt and was cancelled. He remains on death row. His most recent execution date of November 13, 2024 was stayed by a federal judge to allow for legal challenges. He remains on death row at the Idaho Maximum Security Institution in Kuna, Idaho.

== Early life ==
Creech was born on September 9, 1950, in Dayton, Ohio. He grew up in an unstable household where his parents frequently argued with one another, eventually leading to a divorce (which happened in 1969 or 1970, according to Creech's testimony on the stand in his October 1974 trial). Creech was left to live with his father, who years later would die from unclear causes right in front of him on May 31, 1970, while visiting his son in prison—‌Thomas was housed in the psychiatric unit in Chillicothe, Ohio at the time. Creech claimed to have attacked the inmate nurse who had tended to his father.

The next few years of Creech's life are difficult to verify, as they are interwoven with hearsay and his own uncorroborated claims. From what little can be definitively confirmed, he ran away from his hometown and became a drifter, travelling frequently cross-country. He was arrested July 27, 1969, for armed robbery. He took a plea deal, reducing the charge to unarmed robbery, and on December 11, 1969, he was sentenced to a 2-to-5-year prison term. He was paroled on December 2, 1971. In March 1973, he married 16-year-old Thomasine Loren White of Portland, Oregon, who allegedly was with Creech in Arizona on October 22, 1973, when Paul Schrader was murdered in a Tucson motel. Starting in early 1974, Thomasine was in and out of a psychiatric hospital in Salem, Oregon, where she eventually killed herself in November 1979. In a letter that Creech sent to KIVI-TV decades after the fact, he claimed that his wife had been raped by a gang of men and then thrown out a window, causing her debilitating physical and mental injuries that were the primary contributors for her decision to end her life.

On August 22, 1973, he broke the conditions of his parole by allegedly stealing 13 cartons of cigarettes in Portland. Creech was arrested in Portland Oregon in late March 1974 on that theft and another charge of breaking and entering. He also was wanted in Ohio for jumping parole. The charges were dropped after he was admitted to a psychiatric hospital on April 9, 1974, for a mental evaluation. Creech was released only 10 days later on April 19, 1974, after it was determined that he did not suffer from any mental illnesses.

Five weeks later, after a suicide attempt, on May 24, 1974, Creech was re-admitted to the Oregon State Hospital, this time under civil commitment. He quickly was moved out of maximum security and by May 30, he was in an open ward and qualified for 3-day weekend passes. He was released on June 20, 1974. In early August 1974, Creech was back in Portland, where he found a job as a sexton at St. Mark's Episcopal Church. He later quit his job after the body of a man was found in his living quarters on August 17, 1974. Creech departed Portland, heading south on a bus to San Francisco.

== Idaho murders and arrest ==
On November 3, 1974, Creech and his girlfriend Carol Spaulding were hitchhiking in Idaho from Lewiston south to Donnelly when a 1956-model Buick Century, operated by two house painters, 34-year-old Edward Thomas Arnold and 30-year-old John Wayne Bradford, picked them up. Along the way, in the early morning hours of Monday, November 4, Creech pulled out a pistol and shot both of them in the head, then hid their bodies in a barrow pit along Highway 55 in Valley County near Donnelly, north of Cascade. Their bodies and blood-spattered car were found the next day, on Tuesday, November 5, 1974.

Two days after the murders, after Creech was proposed as a suspect in two additional murders in Oregon and for allegedly sending death threats to the newly elected Colorado senator Gary Hart, he and Spaulding were arrested in Glenns Ferry (in Elmore County) by police officer Bill Hill, who had been notified that they were fugitives wanted for murder. While both of them were arraigned on murder charges, Creech was cleared of his supposed involvement with the death threats, as it was determined that it was just rumors that spread from a police officer, one of Hart's campaign managers and a prosecutor. Briefly held at the Valley County jail in Cascade, Creech was transferred ninety miles (145 km) south to the more secure Ada County jail in Boise.

== Trial and imprisonment ==
About a week after his arrest, Creech attempted suicide by slashing his wrists with a broken piece of mirror, but managed only a minor injury before being restrained by prison guards and moved to another cell. In January 1975, it was decided that the now-18-year-old Spaulding would be tried as an adult for the two counts of first-degree murder.

On February 25, 1975, Carol Spaulding plead guilty to abetting (harboring a fugitive, specifically) and was sentenced to 2 years in prison. She began serving her sentence in Idaho, but was transferred to Carson City, Nevada in early May 1975 along with all the other women held in the prison in Boise. A week later, Spaulding was brought back to Idaho to testify at Creech's trial scheduled for May 20, which was subsequently postponed and relocated.

On January 12, 1975, Thomas Creech's trial was set for May 20, 1975 at the Valley County Courthouse in Cascade, Idaho. All the pretrial work was done (motions, discovery, psychiatric exams, subpoenas) when jury selection began on May 20. After 2 full days of jury selection, Judge J. Ray Durtschi called a mistrial. He cited that several articles had appeared immediately before trial. These articles referred to information and evidence that would probably be inadmissible at trial but would probably be prejudicial to the defense. This – combined with the small size of Valley County (≈3,400 in 1975), and the rarity of murder there (last murder was in 1947) – meant that a change of venue was necessary.

On May 29, 1975, Judge Durtschi issued a gag order. In early June, public defender Ward Hower asked to be recused and Creech's new private attorney Bruce O. Robinson was approved by the court in a hearing held June 9, with the switch formally approved on June 14, 1975. By August 6, the venue, schedule, and new trial date had all been worked out – the trial would commence on Oct. 6, 1975 in Wallace, Idaho in Shoshone County, which is in Idaho's 4th Judicial District, with Judge Durtschi still presiding. On August 7, Creech was transferred 400+ miles north to the jail in Wallace.

Creech continued to cause trouble even after his arrest; on June 16, he attacked and injured his cellmate William O. Fischer during an altercation. Fischer had to be driven to hospital to treat his facial injuries, but no further information is available about the incident itself due to a gag order being placed on the case. A month later, Creech attempted to sue the Idaho Statesman for supposedly violating his right to a fair trial by publishing information on other crimes he was either convicted or suspected of, thus possibly prejudicing the public against him.

In August, shortly after a change of venue from Cascade to Wallace (in Shoshone County) was accepted, Creech was sent to the hospital for stitches after suffering injuries caused from falling out of his bunk bed in his cell and hitting his head. In October, it was ruled that an alleged confession, in which Creech, who initially had claimed he was not near the murder site, says that he had shot and killed the two men after they pulled a knife on them and threatened to rape Spaulding, could be admitted as evidence in the upcoming trial.

=== Confessions and other victims ===
After his taking the stand at his trial in October 1975, Creech shocked the entire nation when he readily admitted his responsibility in at least 42 murders in nearly a dozen states. He alleged the first murder occurred when he was 15 (in August 1966) when he drowned a friend in New Miami, Ohio. In his confession, Creech claimed he had killed a gay man in San Francisco in the fall of 1966, after running away from home, and later killed five people in Ohio in contract murders while he was with the Outlaws, and later began killing people in Satanic rituals involving human sacrifices. In total, he claimed to know of such killings that had occurred in Burien, Washington; San Diego, San Francisco and Malibu, California; Beaver, Ogden and Salt Lake City, Utah; Tulsa, Oklahoma; Jackson Hole, Wyoming; Missoula, Montana; Wichita, Kansas, and another city in Colorado. He also directed the authorities to two alleged burial grounds in Los Angeles County, where he claimed they could locate 100 victims, but the searches only turned up a cow bone.

While his confessions were shocking, authorities considered most of them to be bogus, with one officer saying that his recitation of the 'Satanic rites' had been copied word-for-word from an issue of Playboy. Nonetheless, they were able to link him to the murders of nine victims in total, none of whom were killed in supposed "Satanic sacrifices": Vivian Grant Robinson (50) in Sacramento, California; William Joseph Dean (22), the man whose body was found in Creech's church living quarters in Portland, Oregon; store clerk Sandra Jan Ramsamoog (21) in Salem, Oregon, who was killed not long after Dean; Gordon Lee Stanton (44) and Charles Thomas Miller near Las Vegas, Nevada; and Riogley Stewart McKenzie (22) near Baggs, Wyoming. Among his credible victims was 70-year-old retiree Paul C. Schrader, who was stabbed to death in an apparent robbery at the Downtown Motor Hotel in Tucson, Arizona, on October 22, 1973. Creech was working as a fry cook in the El Bambi Cafe in Beaver, Utah, when he was arrested on December 29, 1973, for disorderly conduct and identified as the suspect after a routine police check revealed that he was wanted for Schrader's murder. Creech was charged with the murder, and his trial began February 28, 1974, but he was acquitted on March 6, 1974, after only hours of deliberation. Creech pleaded guilty to the 1974 murder of William Joseph Dean in Portland, Oregon. Creech was also convicted in the murder of Vivian Grant Robinson in Sacramento, California. He has five murder convictions in total. Just days before the rejection of his clemency plea in 2024, Creech was found to be the true perpetrator behind the unsolved murder of Daniel Walker in San Bernardino, California in October 1974.

While he was now considered a self-admitted serial killer, Creech continued to profess his innocence in the Arnold-Bradford murders. The jury deliberated overnight before returning a guilty verdict to the case due to the confusing circumstances. His attorney, with the assistance of private investigator John Wickersham, sought to interview additional witnesses in order to have the conviction overturned. Five months later on March 25, 1976, Creech was sentenced to death by hanging for the two murders.

Originally set for May 21, his execution was stayed pending appeals, with Creech willingly offering to stand trial for some of his killings in Oregon and California.

After the Idaho Supreme Court officially commuted Creech's death sentence to two life sentences, other states were finally able to proceed against Creech. On August 3, 1979, Creech was convicted of the murder of William Joseph Dean (22), whom Creech had shot in Portland, Oregon in the early morning hours of August 15, 1974 (Mr. Dean's body was discovered August 17). Creech was sentenced to 99 years imprisonment (essentially life) for murdering Mr. Dean. The other Oregon murder was in a different county, in Salem, Oregon. In this case, the Marion County prosecutor decided to drop the charge against Creech for murdering grocery clerk Sandra Jan Ramsamooj (21) on August 17, 1974. Creech was next extradited to California. In September 1980, Creech was convicted of the murder of Vivian Grant Robinson (50), whom Creech strangled in Mr. Robinson's Sacramento home in mid-June 1974 (his body was discovered June 19). Creech was sentenced to life imprisonment for murdering Mr. Robinson.

=== Prison murder and new sentence ===
As a result of the 1976 Supreme Court ruling Gregg v. Georgia (which led to changes in death penalty sentencing), one of Creech's attorneys, Bruce Robinson, sought to have his client's death sentence commuted to life imprisonment, citing that his sentence violated the state's then-illegitimate death penalty statute. Robinson's strategy proved to be a success as Creech's sentence was later commuted to life imprisonment. Robinson additionally petitioned for Creech to be freed altogether but was unsuccessful.

Creech was housed at the Idaho State Correctional Institution, east of Kuna. He worked as a janitor in the prison despite the protests of two prosecutors, who warned the wardens that he still posed a threat, even to other inmates. Their fears were realized on May 13, 1981, when 23-year-old David Dale Jensen, a car thief who had previous altercations with Creech, was murdered by Creech, with a sock stuffed with batteries. There are two theories over the murder, which Creech has himself changed at different points in time. The first theory was that Jensen attempted to attack Creech using the sock of batteries. The second theory, which Creech claimed at his 1980s sentencing hearing, involved different inmates offering to pay Creech for killing Jensen since he was not well liked at the prison; in that scenario, Creech, through an intermediary, gave Jensen weapons to attack Creech to justify killing Jensen, essentially setting up Jensen to be killed. Regardless of the pretext to the murder, Creech managed to take hold of the sock and started beating Jensen with it, repeatedly bashing and kicking his head, causing Jensen's death. Jensen, who was a car thief, was disabled, which impaired his ability to adequately protect himself in prison. Charged with first-degree murder, Creech changed his plea to guilty and was sentenced to death. The sentencing judge acknowledged that Creech "did not instigate the fight with the victim, but the victim, without provocation, attacked him. [Creech] was initially justified in protecting himself," when balancing the aggravating and mitigating factors however the judge also identified five aggravating factors and stated that "the murder, once commenced, appears to have been an intentional, calculated act," with "the victim, once the attack commenced, was under the complete domination and control of the defendant", concluding that the murder and the "violent actions Creech" took "went well beyond self-defense." He asked the victim's father for forgiveness and stated his wish to be executed as he did not want to die in solitary confinement; however, Creech has since changed his mind having appealed his sentence for Jensen's murder for over 40 years.

== Current status ==
Since his second death sentence, Creech has been on death row, now housed at the Idaho Maximum Security Institution, where he is also the longest-serving inmate. One of the prosecutors at his original trial, Jim Harris, later said in an interview that he wished Creech to be taken off death row as he considered that his case had cost the taxpayers too much for an execution that possibly may never happen.

In 2020, Creech and another death row inmate, Gerald Pizzuto, filed a federal lawsuit in which they claimed their rights were violated by the state's secrecy surrounding the execution protocol. The lawsuit was thrown out by U.S. District Court Judge David Nye, citing their ongoing appeals as a prime factor of why it has no current standing.

=== Failed execution attempt ===
On October 12, 2023, Judge Jason D. Scott signed Creech's death warrant, setting his execution date for November 8, 2023. On October 18, the Idaho Commission of Pardons and Parole announced they would delay Creech's execution date after they granted a request from Creech for a commutation hearing, making Creech the third death row prisoner in Idaho's legal history to be given a clemency hearing.

On January 29, 2024, the Idaho Pardon and Parole Board deadlocked 3–3 on whether to grant Creech clemency. As the vote to grant clemency was not a majority, his death sentence was upheld. Governor Brad Little, who has the ultimate authority on whether to grant clemency in capital cases, chose to not grant Creech clemency. On January 30, 2024, Judge Jason D. Scott again signed a death warrant setting Creech's execution for February 28, 2024.

After the death warrant was issued, Creech filed two appeals. The first was to call for another clemency review on the grounds that it was made in the absence of the seventh parole board member (who backed out prior to the vote) and that his participation was required to ensure a fairer outcome for Creech's clemency hearing, while the second was to declare his death sentence, which was handed to him by a judge and not a jury, as unconstitutional. On February 9, 2024, the Idaho Supreme Court dismissed Creech's pleas, and his execution was still set to occur on February 28, 2024. The Idaho governor also declared publicly that he had no intention to spare Creech from the punishment due to the magnitude of his crimes.

The 9th U.S. Circuit Court of Appeals from California also rejected Creech's appeal on February 23, 2024. Creech's lawyers sought to have his death sentence overturned on the grounds that it was unconstitutionally imposed by a judge and not a jury, but the judges admonished his lawyers for not raising the issue earlier and without providing credible evidence to substantiate their claims, and they described his motion as an act of delay for the sake of delaying his execution. Jensen's family publicly opposed the clemency plea of Creech, stating that Jensen was a "gentle soul and a prankster who loved hunting and spending time outdoors", and Jensen's daughter, who was four when her father died, stated that she never got to know her father and felt aggrieved that Creech was still alive even after years since her father was murdered. Creech's supporters continued to advocate for a commutation of his death sentence to life imprisonment on the grounds that Creech had reformed and was no longer a threat to society despite the enormity of his crimes.

On February 28, 2024, Creech's execution was set to proceed. However, one hour past the designated 10:00 a.m. execution time, it was announced that the medical team had failed to successfully establish an intravenous line for the lethal injection drugs. The execution was called off and Creech was escorted back to his cell.

=== New death warrant ===
On October 16, 2024, a new death warrant was issued for Creech, rescheduling him to be executed on November 13, 2024. On November 6, a federal judge granted Creech a stay of execution to allow legal challenges to be filed against the execution protocol.

As of July 2026, Creech remains incarcerated on death row at the Idaho Maximum Security Institution awaiting a new execution date.

== See also ==
- Capital punishment in Idaho
- List of death row inmates in the United States § Idaho
- List of longest prison sentences served
- List of serial killers in the United States
