= Raymond Snowden =

American murderer executed in Idaho (1921–1957)

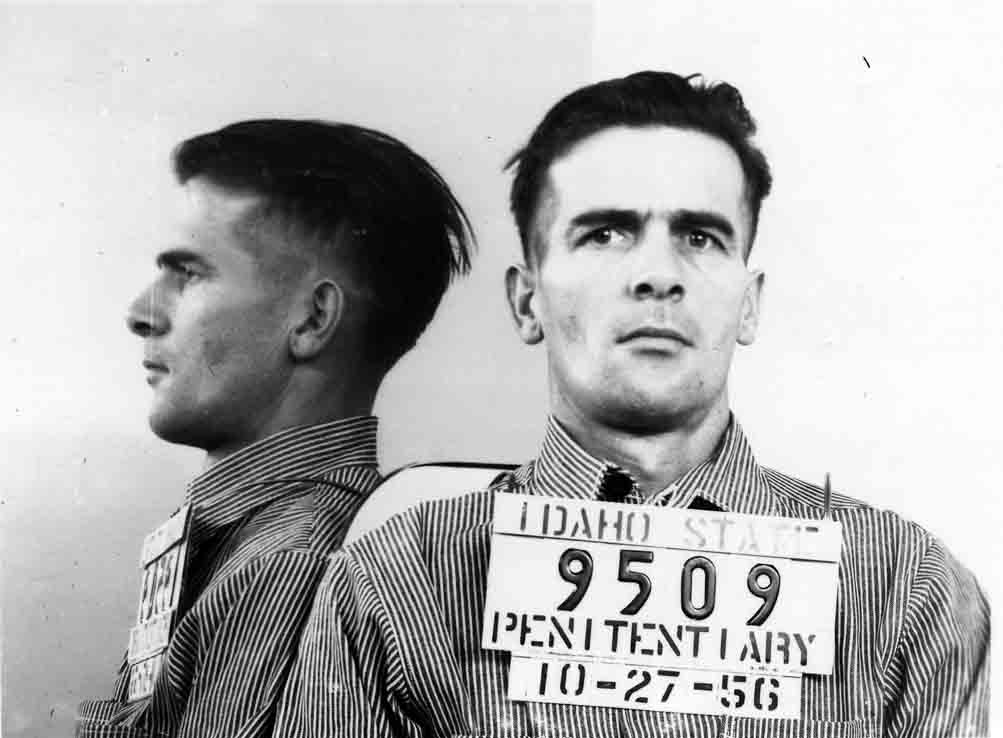
- Death row mugshot, October 1956
- Born: October 22, 1921; Massachusetts, U.S.
- Died: October 18, 1957 (aged 35); Idaho State Penitentiary; Boise, Idaho, U.S.
- Cause of death: Execution by hanging
- Resting place: Old Idaho State Penitentiary Cemetery
- Motive: Victim spurned his advances
- Conviction: First degree murder
- Penalty: Death

Details
- Victims: Cora Lucyle Dean, 48
- Date: September 22, 1956

Raymond Allen Snowden (October 22, 1921 – October 18, 1957) was an American man who was convicted of the 1956 murder of Cora Lucyle Dean and executed in Idaho. Snowden was noteworthy for being the last person executed in the state before the 1972 Furman v. Georgia decision by the United States Supreme Court led to a nationwide death penalty moratorium. He was also the last to be executed in Idaho by hanging, as the state adopted a new execution method, lethal injection, after reinstating the death penalty. Due to the nature of the murder he committed, Snowden was known as "Idaho's Jack the Ripper."

== Background ==
Snowden was born in New England; at some point, he lived in Middleborough, Massachusetts. Snowden was an itinerant laborer in southwestern Idaho, staying in a hotel in Boise at the time of the murder.

In July 1956, Snowden allegedly attacked his common-law wife and threatened her with a knife. He was released after spending only one day in the Ada County jail. Soon after, he pleaded guilty to battery charges and was required to repay court costs.

Cora Lucyle Dean was a 48-year-old woman who had just moved to Idaho from Pasadena, California, four months prior to her murder. At the time of her death, she lived with her mother, Lucy Bundy, in Boise.

== Murder of Cora Dean ==
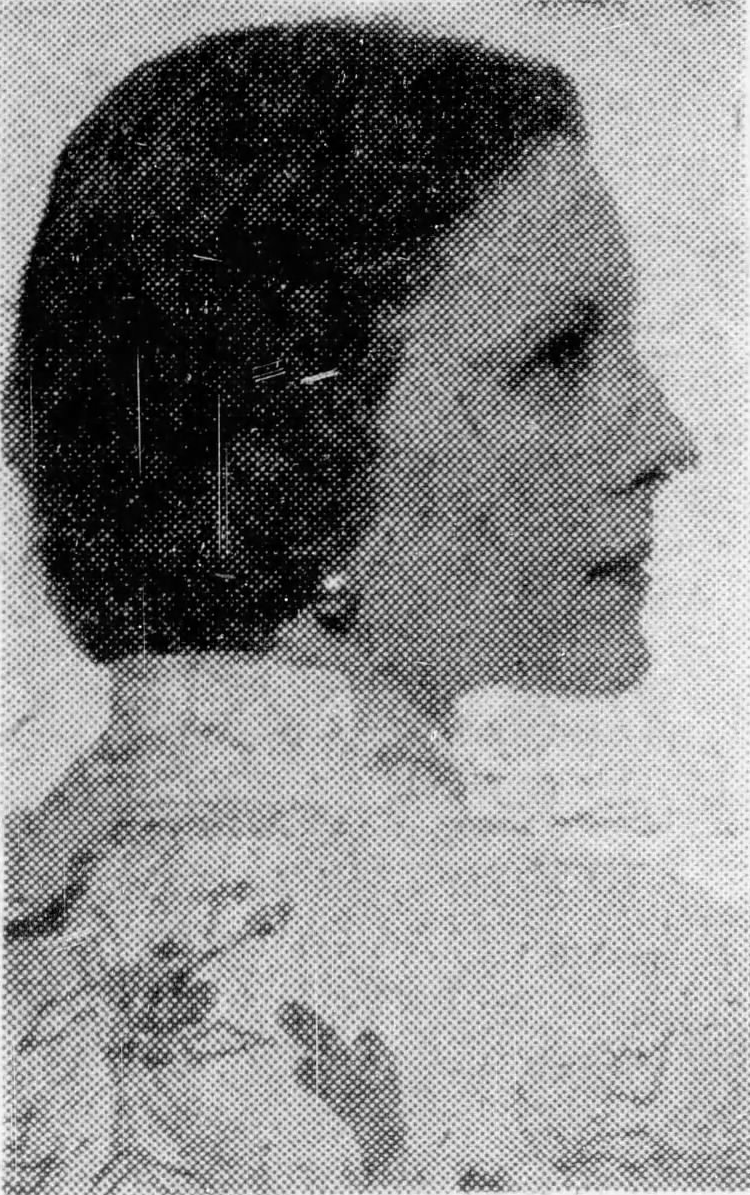
Cora Lucyle Dean, murder victim

On Saturday, September 22, 1956, 34-year-old Snowden went bar-hopping and drank heavily in Garden City, adjacent to Boise. During his time at his final bar, a nightclub, he encountered Cora Dean, whom he recognized but had not yet met. After talking, he and Dean left the nightclub. According to Snowden, after he attempted to proposition her, he and Dean had an argument about who should pay for a taxi Dean wanted. Snowden also stated that he hit Dean, and Dean responded by kicking him, after she refused his sexual advances. Snowden pulled out a penknife, which he used to slash Dean's throat. After slashing her throat, Snowden mutilated Dean's body by stabbing her at least 29 times. He then stole Dean's wallet and hailed a ride from a passing motorist, who drove Snowden back to Boise. Snowden changed clothes in a bowling alley, threw his bloodied clothes away, and discarded the murder weapon in a sewer. A boy riding his bicycle discovered Cora Dean's body in a Boise suburb on September 23, and Dean's mother positively identified the body. Snowden was arrested on the morning of September 24.

Snowden's arraignment took place on the night of September 24. During his interrogation, which lasted at least eight hours, although he initially denied knowing anything about the crime, Snowden eventually confessed to Dean's murder. He told authorities he murdered Dean because he was angry, and that he discarded the murder weapon in a drain, although it took authorities several days to locate the drain where Snowden had left the knife.

Authorities described Snowden as a "sex psychopath" and alluded to there being additional grisly details of Dean's murder that they did not wish to disclose until Snowden's trial. An autopsy revealed that Snowden inflicted sexualized cuts on Dean's body.

At one point, Snowden was also a suspect in the murder of a woman from Lynn, Massachusetts, by the name of Frances Cochran. Cochran was murdered 15 years prior to Dean, and after Snowden was in custody for Dean's murder, Idaho officials alerted Massachusetts officials of the possible connection because of Snowden's ties to Massachusetts. Ultimately, the district attorney in Massachusetts felt that the murders were "not comparable" and eliminated Snowden as a suspect in Cochran's murder.

== Guilty plea and appeals ==
While awaiting trial, Snowden was housed in the Ada County jail. On September 28, 1956, Snowden asked for and received a court-appointed attorney. On October 5, 1956, he pleaded not guilty to the charges. However, on October 18, 1956, he changed his plea to guilty. After verifying Snowden understood that his guilty plea would lead to him waiving his right to a trial by jury and could lead to a life sentence or an execution, Judge M. Oliver Koelsch scheduled a hearing for October 23 to determine the degree of murder Snowden committed, as well as a punishment. The court ultimately determined that Snowden's crime was a first-degree murder and that there were no mitigating circumstances they could identify to justify reducing his punishment, so on October 26, Snowden was sentenced to death. His death sentence was initially scheduled to be carried out on December 7, 1956, but Snowden's lawyer filed a notice of appeal on his behalf, causing the initial execution date to be automatically delayed.

In his appeal, Snowden argued that Dean's murder did not meet the criteria of a first degree murder because he did not exhibit "malice aforethought." Snowden's attorney also requested a commutation of Snowden's sentence based on purported mental illness, as well as based on the argument that the crime more closely resembled second-degree murder or manslaughter, rather than first-degree murder, and that the death penalty was a disproportionately harsh punishment. In a unanimous opinion, the Idaho Supreme Court rejected Snowden's appeal. In September 1957, Judge Koelsch set Snowden's execution date for October 18, 1957.

== Execution ==
Snowden did not complete his last meal of lobster, although he invited the chaplain of the prison, who attended to him in his last eight hours of life, to eat the last meal with him. The warden described Snowden as being in "good spirits" on the day of his death.

Shortly before midnight on October 17, 1957, guards escorted Snowden to the death chamber at the Old Idaho State Penitentiary. They allegedly restrained him to a gurney or spinal board for the short journey from his cell to the room containing Idaho's gallows, and Snowden allegedly remained restrained to the board even as he was dropped through the trap door. In order to carry out Snowden's sentence, Idaho officials enlisted in the help of an experienced executioner from another state. When asked for a last statement, Snowden said, "I can't put into words what I want to say." The trap door opened at 12:05 am on October 18, and Snowden was pronounced dead at 12:20 am. Snowden's execution was the only one to occur in the penitentiary's so-called "Gallows Room," which was constructed by convicts between 1954 and 1955; all previous executions occurred either on a gallows constructed in the penitentiary's Rose Garden, or on a gallows constructed near a gate in the prison.

A newspaper published the day after Snowden's execution stated that the only witnesses to the execution were Snowden's spiritual advisor, the penitentiary doctor, two other physicians, the Ada County coroner, the executioner, and the executioner's assistant. A 1981 account of Snowden's execution, based on the recollection of a correctional officer, stated that there were two or three reporters present who refused to enter Idaho's newly constructed "observation room" for witnesses to view the hanging, but that a dozen witnesses were in that room and did witness the hanging. Snowden's execution was allegedly botched when the rope failed to break his neck as intended. Snowden's purportedly botched execution led to ghost stories being formed about him haunting the penitentiary where his execution took place. Another man, a minister who attended to and befriended Snowden in his final moments and witnessed the execution, implied in a retrospective 1993 interview that Snowden's execution was not botched and that his death was "quick".

Prior to the execution, Snowden's brother, who lived in Boston, wrote to the prison to tell authorities that the Snowden family did not wish to claim his body, so he was buried in an unmarked grave in the prison's cemetery.

More than 36 years passed between Snowden's execution and the next execution in Idaho, that of Keith Wells by means of lethal injection, on January 6, 1994.

== See also ==
- Capital punishment in Idaho
- List of people executed in Idaho
- List of people executed in the United States in 1957

Preceded by Troy D. Powell and Ernest Lee Walrath – 1951	Executions carried out in Idaho	Succeeded by Keith Eugene Wells – 1994
