= Idaho Maximum Security Institution =

Prison in Idaho, United States

Coordinates: 43°28′44″N 116°13′08″W

- Interactive map of Idaho Maximum Security Institution
- Location: 13400 S. Pleasant Valley Rd Kuna, Idaho, U.S.
- Security class: maximum, close custody
- Capacity: 535
- Opened: 1989
- Managed by: Idaho Department of Correction
- Director: Bree Derrick
- Warden: Derrek Governor

Idaho Maximum Security Institution (IMSI) is a maximum-security prison located near Kuna, Idaho, United States, one of a cluster of seven detention facilities known as the "South Boise Prison Complex". The other prisons in the area are the Correctional Alternative Placement Program, the Idaho State Correctional Center, the Idaho State Correctional Institution, the South Boise Women's Correctional Center, the South Idaho Correctional Institution, and the South Idaho Correctional Institution-Community Work Center. IMSI houses Idaho's death row for men and execution chamber.

The IMSI prison was opened in November 1989 to confine Idaho's most violent offenders. In 2024, Security Journal Americas ranked it as one of “America’s Worst Prisons”.

The compound is located within a double perimeter fence reinforced with razor wire, an electronic detection system and a 24-hour armed perimeter patrol. The offender population includes many mental health offenders, including subjects of civil commitments. Thirty beds are dedicated for prisoners with acute mental illness. IMSI has restrictive housing beds dedicated to administrative segregation, disciplinary detention and death row. The remaining beds are allocated for close-custody general population offenders.

== Notable prisoners ==
- Torey Adamcik, murderer
- Thomas Eugene Creech, murderer
- Gerald Pizzuto, rapist and murderer
- Bryan Kohberger, murderer
- Keith Wells, murderer (executed in 1994)
- James Edward Wood, rapist and murderer (died in 2004)
- Paul Ezra Rhoades, murderer (executed in 2011)
- Richard Albert Leavitt, murderer (executed in 2012)
- Chad Daybell, murderer
