= Gerald Pizzuto =

American convicted serial killer

- IDOC mugshot of Gerald Pizzuto, October 2007
- Born: Gerald Ross Pizzuto Jr. January 11, 1956 (age 70); Orland, California, U.S.
- Status: Incarcerated on death row in Idaho
- Convictions: Michigan; Rape; Idaho; First-degree murder (x2); Washington; First-degree murder (Drury); Second-degree murder (Jones)
- Penalty: Michigan; 20 to 40 years' imprisonment (rape); Idaho; Death (x2) (first-degree murder); 14 years' imprisonment (grand theft); Life imprisonment (robbery); Washington; 69 years and seven months' imprisonment (Note: 41 years and one month for first-degree murder and 28 years and six months for second-degree murder)

Details
- Victims: 4 murder victims, 1 rape victim (Note: This is the list of victims pertaining to Pizzuto's convictions. There was at least one carjacking victim, although Pizzuto was never charged for the crime.)
- Date: 1975 (Michigan); March 1985 (Washington); July 25, 1985 (Idaho)
- Locations: Michigan, Washington, Idaho
- Imprisoned at: Idaho Maximum Security Institution

Gerald Ross Pizzuto Jr. (born January 11, 1956) is an American serial killer convicted of four murders committed in both Idaho and Washington after his release from prison for a Michigan rape conviction. In the Washington city of Seattle, Pizzuto had strangled 51-year-old Rita Drury to death in March 1985, and also fatally shot 31-year-old John Jones weeks later. Subsequently, in Marsing, Idaho, Pizzuto committed the double murder of 58-year-old Alberta Herndon and her 37-year-old nephew Delbert Herndon in July 1985.

Pizzuto was arrested through a manhunt days after the double murder, and he faced varied murder charges in both Washington and Idaho for the killings he committed. For the murders of the Herndons, Pizzuto was sentenced to death by Idaho, and he was also convicted of killing both Drury (on the first degree) and Jones (on the second degree) and sentenced to more than 69 years in prison by the trial courts of Washington. He is currently on Idaho's death row pending his execution, which has been stayed due to legal issues.

== Personal life ==
Born in Orland, California, on January 11, 1956, Gerald Ross Pizzuto Jr., who had at least two sisters in his family, came from a dysfunctional family background and had a troubled childhood overall.

According to varied sources, Pizzuto was a victim of extreme physical and sexual abuse by his stepfather. When Pizzuto was only five or six, Pizzuto's stepfather would often wake him up with a flashlight and hunting knife in the middle of the night, and he also took Pizzuto to a garage, tied him up with extension cords, and raped him regularly. Pizzuto's stepfather even went as far as to charge other adult men up to $20 to rape Pizzuto as well. According to Pizzuto's sisters, who witnessed the abuse, their mother had never intervened to stop the mistreatment of her son.

Apart from the sexual abuse of his stepson, Pizzuto's stepfather also would regularly hit his stepson, using an assortment of objects like a cattle prod and horse crop, and these beatings left Pizzuto with childhood brain damage. In his adulthood, Pizzuto, who was married at one point, was reportedly abusive towards his ex-wife, even knocking out her teeth at one point. On one occasion, Pizzuto had savagely assaulted his pregnant ex-wife to the extent that the fetus did not survive.

In 1975, Pizzuto was charged with kidnapping and raping a woman at gunpoint in Michigan, and therefore sentenced to 20 to 40 years of imprisonment. Pizzuto served nine years before he was released on parole in 1984. However, Pizzuto violated his parole and fled to Seattle, Washington, where he would commit his first murder in March 1985.

== Murders ==
Between March and July 1985, Gerald Pizzuto had committed four murders in both the states of Washington and Idaho (two in each state).

=== Rita Drury and John Jones ===
Sometime on March 16 or March 17, 1985, Pizzuto and an accomplice named John Rodewald entered the home of 51-year-old Rita Drury in Seattle, Washington. Both men attacked Drury (who was then babysitting her granddaughter) and robbed her of $200 in total. Apart from this, Pizzuto and Rodewald had strangled Drury to death before they fled the house with the stolen money.

Two weeks later, on March 30, 1985, Pizzuto alone entered the trailer of 31-year-old John Roy Jones in Seattle, where he shot Jones to death after the pair got into an argument over cocaine. In a statement Pizzuto told the police that the shooting was accidental, which was disputed by the prosecution during his trial for Jones's fatal shooting.

=== Alberta and Delbert Herndon ===
On July 25, 1985, four months after he killed both Jones and Drury, Pizzuto committed the double murder of two gold prospectors in Idaho.

On that day itself, Pizzuto and two accomplices, William Odom and James Rice, held 58-year-old Alberta "Berta" Herndon and her 37-year-old nephew Delbert "Del" Herndon at gunpoint at the Herndons' cabin near the town of McCall. The trio tied the victims' wrists behind their backs and bound their legs before proceeding to steal their money. Afterwards, Pizzuto wielded a hammer and battered the Herndons to death.

Additionally, Rice used Pizzuto's rifle to shoot Delbert in the head, and later on, Odom, who did not directly participate in the killings, helped both Rice and Pizzuto to bury the bodies of Alberta and Delbert, before they escaped with the loot they stole from the Herndons.

== Arrest and murder trials ==
=== Capture and indictment ===
Although his accomplices were arrested, Gerald Pizzuto managed to evade capture for the past four days by stealing a tourist's truck to drive out of Idaho and later forced another man to drive him to Montana, before a manhunt conducted by both police and FBI agents led to his arrest at his sister's house in Montana on July 29, 1985, four days after the Herndon murders. Initially, Pizzuto was known by the alias "Jerry Gilbertson" before his real identity was discovered.

Pizzuto was charged in both Idaho and Washington for the four murders he committed between March and July 1985. Extradition hearings were conducted in August 1985 to decide whether to send Pizzuto to Washington or Idaho for trial.

=== Trial in Idaho ===
An agreement was reached between the state authorities of both Washington and Idaho to allow Pizzuto to be put on trial first in Idaho before the case in Washington.

On March 27, 1986, Pizzuto was found guilty of two counts of first-degree murder, two counts of felony murder, one count of robbery and one count of grand theft by an Idaho County jury.

On May 23, 1986, Judge George C. Reinhardt sentenced 30-year-old Gerald Ross Pizzuto Jr. to death for each count of first-degree murder. Apart from the two death sentences, Pizzuto also received a 14-year prison term for grand theft and life imprisonment for robbery.

On the other hand, Pizzuto's accomplices – William Odom Jr. and James Rice – were each sentenced to prison terms for lesser charges (second-degree murder for Odom and voluntary manslaughter for Rice) after they reached plea agreements and turned state evidence against Pizzuto. Both Rice and Odom served 12 years in prison before they were eventually released in 1998 and 1999, respectively.

=== Trials in Washington ===
After his sentencing in Idaho for the murders of the Herndons, Pizzuto was brought back to Washington to stand trial for the murders of Rita Drury and John Jones.

On September 30, 1987, King County Superior Court Judge James Sullivan convicted Pizzuto of second-degree murder with respect to the death of Jones.

On October 20, 1987, in a separate court, a Superior County jury found Pizzuto guilty of first-degree murder in the killing of Drury.

On December 7, 1987, Pizzuto was sentenced to 28 years and six months' imprisonment for the murder of Jones and another 41 years and one month for the murder of Drury. The sentences were ordered to run consecutively, making it a total of 69 years and seven months in prison.

John Rodewald, Pizzuto's accomplice in the Drury case, was originally charged with first-degree murder but later pleaded guilty to robbery after agreeing to testify against Pizzuto in the trial. Rodewald was released in September 1987 after completing his prison term.

== Appeal process ==
Originally, Gerald Pizzuto was scheduled to be executed on May 27, 1988, after his death warrant was signed on April 26, 1988. However, on May 16, 1988, Pizzuto was granted a stay of execution.

On August 28, 1989, the Washington Court of Appeals rejected Pizzuto's appeals over the Washington murders.

On January 15, 1991, the Idaho Supreme Court rejected Pizzuto's appeal against his sentence and conviction for the Herndon murders.

In the midst of Pizzuto's appellate process, his execution was scheduled for the second time, and was ordered to take place on June 30, 1992. However, on June 24, 1992, U.S. District Judge Edward Lodge issued a court order to postpone Pizzuto's execution to grant him more time to file a federal court appeal.

On August 3, 1995, the Idaho Supreme Court rejected Pizzuto's petition for new counsel to pursue his claims of ineffective legal representation in his original trial.

On September 6, 2000, the Idaho Supreme Court rejected Pizzuto's post-conviction appeal.

On February 6, 2002, the 9th Circuit Court of Appeals turned down Pizzuto's appeal.

On October 20, 2004, Pizzuto's second appeal to the 9th Circuit Court of Appeals was also dismissed.

In September 2007, Pizzuto appealed to the Idaho Supreme Court to overturn his death sentences, claiming that it would be unconstitutional to execute him given that he was mentally disabled as attributed to his low IQ of 72. On February 22, 2008, the Idaho Supreme Court rejected Pizzuto's fifth petition for post-conviction relief, after rejecting his arguments to vacate his death sentence on the grounds of intellectual disability.

On March 17, 2010, the Idaho Supreme Court rejected a joint appeal filed by Pizzuto and five other condemned inmates from Idaho, who all argued that they were entitled to new trials because the U.S. Supreme Court made a ruling to allow only the jury, not judges, to impose the death penalty. The Idaho Supreme Court ruled that the ruling was made after the six's convictions were finalized by the U.S. Supreme Court and that the verdict was not retroactive and only applicable to future cases, and hence rejected the appeal.

In February 2020, the 9th Circuit Court of Appeals rejected another appeal from Pizzuto, who once again submitted that his death sentence should be vacated on account of his intellectual disability. The same court had rejected the same appeal the previous year.

In 2020, Pizzuto and another death row inmate, Thomas Eugene Creech, filed a federal lawsuit in which they alleged that their rights were violated by the state's secrecy surrounding the execution protocol, and the motion was heard before the United States District Court for the District of Idaho. The motion was rejected by U.S. District Judge David Nye on November 18, 2020.

== Stay of execution ==
=== 2021 death warrant and clemency process ===
By 2021, Gerald Pizzuto had already exhausted all his avenues of appeal against the death sentence. Pizzuto's death warrant was signed on May 6, 2021, and his execution was scheduled to take place on June 2, 2021. At that time, there was an ongoing moratorium on executions in Idaho since 2012 due to the scarcity of lethal injection drugs; the state's legal method of execution was solely lethal injection. The last person executed in Idaho at that point was Richard Albert Leavitt, who was put to death on June 12, 2012, for the murder and mutilation of a woman in 1984.

On May 18, 2021, Idaho District Judge Jay Gaskill granted Pizzuto a stay of execution and approved his petition for a clemency hearing in November 2021.

Before the clemency hearing began, it was reported that Pizzuto had been removed from death row in 2019, despite his death sentence still being in place, and was placed in hospice care. Pizzuto, who was a wheelchair user, was suffering from terminal bladder cancer, heart disease, and severe diabetes, and the doctors speculated that based on the severity of his condition, Pizzuto had at least one more year to live. In light of his terminal condition, Pizzuto's defense team argued for his death sentences to be commuted to life imprisonment without the possibility of parole on humanitarian grounds. They emphasized that Pizzuto's deteriorating health meant he was no longer a threat to society and would likely die in prison of natural causes.

Pizzuto's clemency hearing was scheduled to commence on November 29, 2021. A seven-member parole board committee was appointed to hear the case, and before the panel, the prosecution argued for Pizzuto to be executed, stating that Pizzuto had committed multiple violent crimes like murder and rape and the aggravating factors were to the extent that the case "screams for justice" and warranted capital punishment. On the other hand, Pizzuto's defence counsel sought the commutation of Pizzuto's death sentence to life in prison on account of his terminal illness, and Pizzuto's sisters also testified before the parole board, recounting the horrific physical and sexual abuse which their brother endured as a child, and implored the parole board to allow Pizzuto to live out the rest of his life behind bars under a life sentence.

In the end, on December 30, 2021, by a vote of 4–3, the parole board recommended that the death sentences of Pizzuto be downgraded to life without parole, after they took into consideration the "medical condition and evidence of (Pizzuto's) decreased intellectual function". Idaho Governor Brad Little, however, refused to commute Pizzuto's death sentence and hence rejected the clemency plea, ordering that the execution should move forward. In explaining his reasons to refuse clemency, Little quoted, "The severity of Pizzuto's brutal, senseless, and indiscriminate killing spree strongly warrants against commutation."

=== Appeal and 2022 death warrant ===
In January 2022, Pizzuto filed an appeal against the state execution policy, citing that the use of pentobarbital for his lethal injection execution could potentially constitute a cruel and unusual punishment given his terminal health conditions, and the drug might cause unnecessary and additional pain to him during the execution procedure.

On February 4, 2022, Judge Jay Gaskill allowed Pizzuto's appeal against the governor's clemency decision and commuted Pizzuto's death sentence to life without parole. He ruled that the Idaho governor did not have the power to reject a clemency recommendation in murder cases under the Idaho Constitution, and the governor possessed such powers in only treason or conviction on impeachment but not murder or other offences.

On June 13, 2022, the Idaho Supreme Court heard the appeal by the state, which was argued by Deputy Attorney General LaMont Anderson, who sought to vacate the district court's ruling and restore Pizzuto's death sentence. On August 23, 2022, the Idaho Supreme Court overturned the ruling of Judge Gaskill and reinstated Pizzuto's death sentence, finding that the Idaho governor had the authority to either accept or reject the parole board's recommendation of clemency, and this decision paved the way for the rescheduling of Pizzuto's execution.

On November 16, 2022, three months after the reinstatement of his death sentence, a district judge signed a second death warrant for Pizzuto, whose execution was rescheduled to occur on December 15, 2022. The lawyers of Pizzuto asked for a stay of execution pending a federal appeal filed to the U.S. Supreme Court, in which they sought to bar the state from executing Pizzuto until they amended the state's execution protocols and administrative regulation on executions.

On November 30, 2022, Pizzuto was granted another stay of execution after the officials of the Idaho Department of Correction (IDC) failed to secure a supply of lethal injection drugs required to carry out Pizzuto's death sentence.

=== 2023 death warrant and indefinite stay of execution (2023–present) ===
On February 24, 2023, a third death warrant was approved for Pizzuto, whose execution was rescheduled to happen on March 23, 2023.

On March 10, 2023, U.S. Idaho District Judge B. Lynn Winmill granted Pizzuto a third stay of execution, on account that the state again failed to procure drugs in time for Pizzuto's upcoming lethal injection execution. That same month, in view of the state's inability to carry out lethal injection executions due to the shortage of drugs, the Idaho lawmakers agreed to pass a new law to legalise executions by firing squad as an alternative execution method should the option of lethal injection be unavailable.

On August 2, 2023, U.S. District Judge B. Lynn Winmill granted Pizzuto an indefinite stay of execution, allowing Pizzuto to file a lawsuit against the Idaho Attorney-General, in which Pizzuto alleged that the multiple attempts to schedule his execution within a short period of time and in the absence of lethal injection drugs had subjected Pizzuto to psychological torture, and it constituted a "cruel and unusual punishment" under the Eighth Amendment.

In November 2023, the state of Idaho managed to procure new drugs and foresaw the potential to resume lethal injection executions. While Pizzuto's appeal was still ongoing, another death row inmate, serial killer Thomas Eugene Creech (who was imprisoned since 1974), was originally set to be the first person executed in Idaho since 2012, but his execution on February 28, 2024, failed due to the medical team being unable to find a vein and failing to administer the drugs, resulting in the cancellation of Creech's execution. Creech remains on death row as of 2025.

As of 2025, Pizzuto remains on death row at the Idaho Maximum Security Institution.

== See also ==
- Capital punishment in Idaho
- List of death row inmates in the United States § Idaho
- List of serial killers in the United States
- List of longest prison sentences served
