= Paul Ezra Rhoades =

American spree killer (1957–2011)

- Born: January 18, 1957; Idaho Falls, Idaho, U.S.
- Died: November 18, 2011 (aged 54); Idaho Maximum Security Institution, Idaho, U.S.
- Other names: Sam Johnson; Rick Edwards; John French
- Status: Executed by lethal injection
- Conviction: First-degree murder (x3)
- Penalty: Baldwin and Michelbacher; Death (x2); Haddon; Life imprisonment without the possibility of parole (x1)

Details
- Victims: 3, with a total of 3-4+ more suspected
- Span of crimes: February 28 – March 21, 1987 (confirmed)
- Country: United States
- States: Idaho (possibly Utah and Wyoming)
- Date apprehended: March 26, 1987

Paul Ezra Rhoades (January 18, 1957 – November 18, 2011) was an American spree killer and suspected serial killer convicted of three murders committed in Idaho during a three-week crime spree in 1987. He is the prime suspect in at least four additional killings in Utah and Wyoming dating back to 1984, however, he was never conclusively linked to these murders. One of these crimes was eventually solved thanks to the use of genetic genealogy, ruling out Rhoades as the perpetrator and casting doubt of his involvement in the other cases.

He was executed for two of his confirmed murders in 2011, becoming the first person to be executed in Idaho in over seventeen years.

== Early life ==
Paul Ezra Rhoades was born on January 18, 1957, in Idaho Falls, Idaho, the first of four children born to Augustus and Pauline Rhoades. His early life proved turbulent, as Rhoades was struck with polio since the age of 4, for which he constantly had to be hospitalized, and at home, his parents constantly argued. At the age of 10, he began drinking and soon dropped out of high school, after which he started using various drugs. Because of this, Rhoades developed an addiction to methamphetamines which would persist up until his arrest. To provide for his family, he took on various odd jobs both in Idaho and the surrounding states, specializing in sheetrocking. At the same time, however, he started breaking into various homes and stole any valuables he could find.

== Murders ==
On the morning of March 1, 1987, the body of 21-year-old Stacy Dawn Baldwin, a Red Mini Barn clerk who was working the night shift, was found in an archery range about five miles northwest of Blackfoot. She had been shot three times, and it was quickly determined that her killing was likely linked to a robbery gone wrong that occurred the night before.

Soon after, on the morning of March 17, 20-year-old Nolan Haddon, a clerk working at a convenience store in Idaho Falls, was found critically injured in the establishment's walk-in cooler. Haddon was quickly rushed to the Eastern Idaho Regional Medical Center for treatment, but succumbed to his injuries only hours later.

Four days later, the body of 34-year-old Susan Michelbacher, a special ed teacher, was found in a remote lava field west of Idaho Falls. She had been abducted from the parking lot of a supermarket two days prior after dropping off lesson plans at the school where she worked. During the abduction, she cashed two $1,000 checks at separate branches of a bank. She was shot nine times and then raped, quite possibly after she was already deceased.

== Arrest and trials ==
On March 27, 1987, an arrest warrant for grand larceny was put out for Rhoades, who was promptly arrested in Wells, Nevada. While he was detained at the Nevada Highway Patrol Office, his items, including a handgun, were confiscated and handed over to authorities in Idaho. Shortly after, the handgun's bullets were proven to be an exact match to the ones used in the recent slayings in Blackfoot and Idaho Falls. As a result, Rhoades was first charged with Michelbacher's murder, in addition to first-degree kidnapping, robbery, rape, desecration of a corpse and five counts of firearm violations. It was decided that the two other murder charges would be tried in separate trials.

On January 18, 1988, Rhoades' first trial began, after his attorneys' bid for an insanity defense was rejected by the Idaho Supreme Court. Among the possible choices for jurors was then-Governor Cecil Andrus, who was later excused from the panel due to his familiarity with the case due to signing the extradition documents from Nevada. Among the prosecution's witnesses was Bonneville County, Idaho Detective Victor Rodriguez, who claimed that he and five other officers had heard the defendant admit to Michelbacher's murder while in their custody, but had failed to file the statement in a report due to "an oversight". This claim was later contested by defense attorney John Radin, as Rodriguez later claimed that this had never occurred while being questioned by him. By January 26, the defense team had rested their case, with the proceedings being delayed for two hours as court officials had to wait for Rhoades' suit to be returned from a dry cleaning store. On the following day, after less than five hours of deliberations, the jury returned a verdict of guilty on all counts against Rhoades, with his sentencing phase set for March 16.

In the meantime, Rhoades was sent off to stand trial for the murder of Baldwin, which was held on March 3. His attorneys contended that the circumstantial evidence of the prosecution was flimsy, and that his client's alibi of babysitting his sister's two children at the supposed time of the crime could be easily corroborated by his family members. In addition, they also claimed that a man's watch found in Rhoades' possession, which was claimed to have been stolen from Baldwin, was actually bought by Teresa Rhoades as a Christmas gift for her son. While the prosecution team did admit that the evidence was largely circumstantial, they pointed out that it overwhelmingly pointed towards Rhoades: most notably, a distinct shoe imprint that was an identical match to the defendant's unusually large foot, as well as the bullets from his handgun. On March 12, Rhoades was again found guilty on all counts by jury verdict, and his sentencing date regulated for May 9 of that year. His final trial for the murder of Haddon was subsequently set for April 25.

On March 24, Rhoades was sentenced to death for Michelbacher's murder and to life imprisonment without parole for all the remaining charges. After the sentence was read out, he grabbed the chair he had been sitting in and threw it at the prosecutor, but it was caught by Sheriff Rodriguez before anyone could be hurt. Rhoades was subsequently escorted out of the court room by deputies, while his sister hurled verbal abuses at the prosecutor. Once the Haddon trial approached, Rhoades' lawyers filed a motion to have Justice Larry Boyle to be disqualified from presiding over this trial, citing the fact that he had sentenced him to death in the Michelbacher trial. That motion was denied, and Boyle was allowed to proceed as the main judge. In a bid to avoid another prolonged trial, Rhoades pleaded guilty to all charges, while still retaining his right to appeal his convictions. As a result of the plea, he was subsequently sentenced to two life terms without parole, but still claimed that he was innocent of this crime.

In the beginning of the sentencing phase for the Baldwin charges, Rhoades' attorneys filed a motion for a retrial by request of his family members, which was initially denied by Justice James Herndon. On the following day, however, he overruled that decision and announced that he would reconsider, as he considered the defendant's complaint about not being present for the arguments phase in the original ruling. This was eventually denied, and Rhoades was promptly sentenced to death for this murder as well, in addition to a life term plus 45 years for the other charges relating to Baldwin's death.

== Possible additional murders ==
While awaiting trial for Haddon's murder, Rhoades was interviewed by Utah police for a possible connection to at least three murders in their jurisdiction that matched his modus operandi. The killings, which occurred in Salt Lake City and Layton, were the following:

- Christine Gallegos (18): shot to death at a parking lot in suburban Salt Lake City on May 15, 1985.
- Carla Maxwell (20): clerk who was shot five times while working at a 7-Eleven store in Layton on April 25, 1986.
- Lisa Strong (25): shot on a street corner in Salt Lake City on May 12, 1986, while apparently running away from her assailant.

According to the task force established to investigate these murders, all of which had been linked via the copper-jacketed, hollow pointed bullets used, they had received information that placed Rhoades in the area at the time of the killings. In addition, they had located another handgun which linked him to numerous burglaries and thefts committed at the Wasatch Front. Around the same time, he was proposed as a possible suspect in the June 21, 1984 murder of 25-year-old Lisa Ehlers, who was found shot to death at a roadside in the Jackson Hole valley, near Bondurant, Wyoming. The main investigator for the task force, Jim Bell, later revealed in an interview with the Jackson Hole Guide that he was able to place Rhoades in the area at the time after conducting an interview with him. However, despite appeals for information to the public, no evidence connecting Rhoades to the killings ever surfaced, and he was never charged.

In May 2025, Othram identified Gallegos' killer as Ricky Lee Stallworth, an airman at the Hill Air Force Base who died from natural causes in 2023. Due to the identification, Rhoades is no longer considered a suspect in this case.

== Execution ==
For the remainder of his life, Rhoades and his legal team filed appeal after appeal in an attempt to have his sentence commuted, citing reasons such as various legal technicalities, his abusive childhood and the supposed cruelty of capital punishment as mitigating factors. All of these appeals were rejected, and he was subsequently executed via lethal injection at the Idaho Maximum Security Institution in Kuna on November 18, 2011.

As his final statement, Rhoades addressed his mother and executioners, stating that he forgave them, before confessing that he indeed had committed the Michelbacher killing, apologizing to her husband. However, he continued to deny responsibility in the Baldwin and Haddon murders, telling the family members that '[they] still have to keep looking', and apologizing that he could not help them. At the time of his execution, he was the second inmate to be executed in the state following Gregg v. Georgia after Keith Wells, who had been executed 17 years earlier. His last meal consisted of hot dogs, sauerkraut, mustard, ketchup, onions, relish, baked beans, veggie sticks, ranch dressing, fruit with gelatin and strawberry ice cream cups. It was the same meal that was offered to all other Idaho Maximum Security inmates that night.

== See also ==
- List of people executed by lethal injection
- List of people executed in Idaho
- List of people executed in the United States in 2011
- List of serial killers in the United States

Executions carried out in Idaho
| Preceded by Keith Eugene Wells January 6, 1994 | Paul Ezra Rhoades; November 18, 2011 | Succeeded by Richard Albert Leavitt June 12, 2012 |
Executions carried out in the United States
| Preceded by Guadalupe Esparza – Texas November 16, 2011 | Paul Ezra Rhoades – Idaho; November 18, 2011 | Succeeded by Gary Roland Welch – Oklahoma January 5, 2012 |
