= List of people executed in Idaho =

The following is a list of people executed by the U.S. state of Idaho since capital punishment was resumed in 1976.

Three men have been executed for murder since the Gregg v. Georgia decision; all three were executed by lethal injection at the Idaho Maximum Security Institution, east of Kuna. Wells' execution in early 1994 was the first in the state in over 36 years, when Raymond Snowden was hanged in October 1957; the next was over 17 years later in November 2011.

== List of people executed in Idaho since 1976 ==
No.	Name	Race	Age	Sex	Date of execution	County	Method	Victim(s)	Governor
1	Keith Eugene Wells	White	31	M	January 6, 1994	Ada	Lethal injection	John Justad and Brandi Rains	Cecil Andrus
2	Paul Ezra Rhoades	White	54	M	November 18, 2011	Bonneville	Lethal injection	Stacy Baldwin, Nolan Haddon, and Susan Michelbacher	Butch Otter
3	Richard Albert Leavitt	White	53	M	June 12, 2012	Bingham	Lethal injection	Danette Jean Elg	Butch Otter

== Demographics ==
Race
White	3	100%
Age
30–39	1	33%
40–49	0	0%
50–59	2	67%
Sex
Male	3	100%
Date of execution
1976–1979	0	0%
1980–1989	0	0%
1990–1999	1	33%
2000–2009	0	0%
2010–2019	2	67%
2020–2029	0	0%
Method
Lethal injection	3	100%
Governor (Party)
Cecil Andrus (D)	1	33%
John Evans (D)	0	0%
Phil Batt (R)	0	0%
Dirk Kempthorne (R)	0	0%
Jim Risch (R)	0	0%
Butch Otter (R)	2	67%
Brad Little (R)	0	0%
Total	3	100%

== Prior executions ==
Previous executions in Idaho were by hanging, first by local authorities and from 1899 onward at the Old Idaho State Penitentiary, east of downtown Boise.

Name	Race	Age	Date of execution	County	Crime	Victim(s)	Governor
James Ellington	White	42	May 27, 1896	Ada	Murder	Charles Briggs, 55, white	William J. McConnell
Sid Larkins	White	37	April 30, 1897	Bingham	Murder	Josie Hill, white	Frank Steunenberg
Herman St. Clair	White	48	June 24, 1898	Boise	Murder-Robbery	John Decker, white	Frank Steunenberg
Edward Rice	White	43	November 30, 1901	Shoshone	Murder-Robbery	Matthew Mailley, 60, white (Note: Also suspected of murdering a Swede named Johnson.)	Frank W. Hunt
James Connors	White	40	December 16, 1904	Bingham	Murder	Elbert Percey Sweet, 54, white (sheriff's deputy)	John T. Morrison
William H. Bond	White	35	August 10, 1906	Ada	Murder	Charles Daly, white	Frank R. Gooding
Fred M. Seward	White	28	May 7, 1909	Latah	Murder	Clara O'Neill, 22, white (girlfriend)	Frank R. Gooding
Noah Arnold	Black	28	December 19, 1924	Bonner	Murder-Robbery	William Crisp, white (Note: Denied murdering Crisp, but confessed to murdering five other people before his execution.)	Charles C. Moore
John Jurko	White	41	July 9, 1926	Twin Falls	Murder	A. B. W. Vandenmark, 70, white	Charles C. Moore
Troy D. Powell	White	21	April 13, 1951	Ada	Murder-Robbery	Newton W. Wilson, 65, white	Len Jordan
Ernest Lee Walrath	White	20	April 13, 1951	Ada	Murder-Robbery	Newton W. Wilson, 65, white	Len Jordan
Raymond Allen Snowden	White	35	October 18, 1957	Ada	Murder	Cora Lucyle Dean, 48, white	Robert E. Smylie

== See also ==
- Capital punishment in Idaho
- Capital punishment in the United States
