= Murder of Danette Elg =

1984 mutilation and murder of a woman in Idaho

Danette Elg
- Undated photo of Danette Elg
- Born: Danette Jean Elg; December 6, 1952; Idaho, U.S.
- Died: July 18, 1984 (aged 31); Blackfoot, Idaho, U.S.
- Cause of death: Fatal stab and slash injuries
- Resting place: Swan Valley Cemetery
- Known for: Victim of a mutilation-murder case

On July 18, 1984, in Blackfoot, Idaho, United States, 31-year-old Danette Jean Elg (December 6, 1952 – July 18, 1984) was murdered in her home after being stabbed and slashed 15 times. Her killer, Richard Albert Leavitt (November 12, 1958 – June 12, 2012), also mutilated her body by removing her sexual organs. Elg's body was discovered several days after her murder. Leavitt was found guilty of murder and sentenced to death. Twenty-eight years later, on June 12, 2012, he was executed by lethal injection. Leavitt was the third person executed in Idaho since 1976 and, as of 2025, was the most recent execution by the state.

== Murder and investigation ==
On July 18, 1984, at her home in Blackfoot, Idaho, 31-year-old Danette Jean Elg, who was sleeping in her bedroom, was set upon by a male intruder, who used a knife to stab and slash her 15 times. The killer also mutilated her by chopping off her sexual organs. Some of the knife wounds inflicted upon Elg were found to be fatal, and Elg died from the attack, from which the extent of violence had left the bed torn and damaged. According to a medical report, one of the stab wounds had penetrated Elg's right lung, another went through the right side of her heart, and a third cut through her left lung. The other wounds also penetrated her stomach, chest cavity, and neck. One of the knife wounds was so deep that it went through Elg's eye and reached her brain.

The murderer was identified as 25-year-old Richard Albert Leavitt, who was a known acquaintance of Elg. The two both resided in the same community in Blackfoot. Sources revealed that on the night of July 16, 1984, two days before her murder, Elg had reported a prowling incident, and she told the police that the prowler, who was believed to be Leavitt, had tried to enter her home. During the incident, the intruder had cut a window screen on Elg's home.

After she was killed, Elg's body was not discovered until three days later. Leavitt tried to cover his tracks by asking both Elg's friends and the police about her whereabouts. He claimed that co-workers and Elg's employer had contacted him after she did not show up for work, but no records showed that these callers had contacted Leavitt. After the murder, the Blackfoot police received two phone calls from someone sharing information believed to be known only to the murderer. Leavitt was the one who made these phone calls, but he identified himself as "Mike Jenkins", and the police were unable to trace any individual with this name. On July 21, 1984, Leavitt received permission from Elg's parents to enter her house, which seemed empty. With assistance from the Blackfoot police, they gained access and discovered the decomposing body of 31-year-old Danette Elg.

After the discovery of Elg's body, the police investigated the case and eventually linked Leavitt to the crime. He was then arrested for the murder of Danette Elg. After his arrest, Richard Leavitt was charged with first-degree murder on February 25, 1985, and under Idaho state law, Leavitt could receive the death penalty if convicted of first-degree murder.

== Richard Leavitt's trial and sentencing ==
Richard Albert Leavitt
- Born: November 12, 1958; Idaho, U.S.
- Died: June 12, 2012 (aged 53); Idaho Maximum Security Institution, Idaho, U.S.
- Cause of death: Execution by lethal injection
- Status: Executed
- Conviction: First degree murder
- Penalty: Death

Details
- Victims: Danette Jean Elg, 31
- Date: July 18, 1984
- Location: Blackfoot, Idaho
- Imprisoned at: Idaho Maximum Security Institution

In July 1985, a year after the murder, Richard Leavitt, whose request for a change of venue of trial was denied, eventually stood trial before a jury at an Idaho state Court.

The prosecution's case was that Leavitt had murdered Danette Elg, and they submitted circumstantial evidence linking Leavitt to the crime. A blood test revealed that apart from the DNA of Elg and her blood, which was type A, there was the DNA of another person that contained blood type O, and it matched to Leavitt. Also, there was a hospital record that showed that Leavitt went to seek treatment for a serious incised wound on his left index finger, and it was theorized that Leavitt had cut his finger while stabbing Elg to death. They also stated that by posing as Mike Jenkins and providing details that only the real killer knew through his phone calls to the police, Leavitt had placed himself at the scene of the crime.

It was similarly adduced during the trial that Leavitt had an alleged morbid sexual curiosity and this was corroborated by two witnesses, one of whom was his ex-wife. Leavitt's ex-wife told the court that she witnessed Leavitt playing with the female sexual organs of a deer during a hunting trip. A former mistress of Leavitt also testified that she saw Leavitt playing with a knife while having sexual intercourse with her and it indicated that Leavitt did so to increase his sexual satisfaction. It was noted that Leavitt had amputated the sexual organs of Elg, which corroborated these above possible morbid sexual curiosities explored by Leavitt. The defense, however, argued that Leavitt was innocent, and Leavitt himself denied that he killed Elg. He claimed at one point that he had a nosebleed while in the room several days before Elg's death. He later changed his story and said he cut his finger on a fan. Although Leavitt's wife was summoned as a witness, it was later found that she and Leavitt conspired to submit false testimony in his favor, and she was therefore charged with perjury, to which she pleaded guilty.

Leavitt was a suspect in two or three possible rapes, but the women never reported the attacks after he allegedly threatened them. He had also been charged with killing two cows with a bow and arrow.

On September 25, 1985, the jury found Leavitt guilty of first-degree murder. His sentencing was scheduled in December 1989 and a neurologist was appointed to examine him in preparation for his sentencing, so as to assess if he was eligible to face the death penalty for the murder of Elg.

On December 19, 1985, 27-year-old Richard Leavitt was sentenced to death by District Judge H. Reynold George, who found the murder to be heinous and atrocious, and the conduct of Leavitt was so abhorrent and inhumane that he should be given the maximum punishment of death. His execution was scheduled for March 28, 1986, but it was postponed pending review from the higher courts.

== Leavitt's appeals ==
After he was sentenced to death in 1985, Richard Leavitt spent 23 years appealing against his death sentence from 1989 to 2012. At several points in time, Leavitt's death sentence was overturned more than once before it was ultimately restored and affirmed by the courts.

On May 30, 1989, the Idaho Supreme Court upheld the murder conviction but they vacated the death sentence and ordered a re-sentencing trial for Leavitt. The prosecution appealed against this decision to the U.S. Supreme Court, but this was not accepted. A re-sentencing hearing eventually took place in December 1989, with Leavitt pleading to the trial court to not sentence him to death. It was presented in court that Leavitt took up poetry and writing in prison and he also formed strong relationships with his older and youngest sons and other inmates, which were among the mitigating factors presented in favor of Leavitt to help him avoid another potential death sentence.

On January 25, 1990, the original trial judge H. Reynold George re-sentenced Leavitt to death, and this ruling was eventually upheld by the Idaho Supreme Court on November 27, 1991. Leavitt would file another appeal on November 8, 1992, to the U.S. Supreme Court, but it was also dismissed.

On September 6, 2000, U.S. District Judge B. Lynn Winmill refused to allow Leavitt's appeal to revoke his death sentence. On December 17, 2000, however, the 9th Circuit Court of Appeals overturned both the murder conviction and death sentence of Leavitt and ordered a re-trial, which was appealed by the Attorney-General, and the conviction and sentence were eventually reinstated. During that same year, Leavitt was named as a suspect behind the 1977 murder of 19-year-old Kurt Cornelison and he underwent DNA testing to verify if he was involved in that case, where another man named Robin LePage was sentenced to life imprisonment despite his alleged innocence.

On June 14, 2004, the 9th Circuit Court of Appeals overturned Leavitt's death sentence after finding it was imposed by a judge but not a jury. They cited a January 2003 law that banned the sentencing scheme by only judges but not juries. This law was later invoked by the U.S. Supreme Court, which clarified that the death sentence should stand in Leavitt's case since the law was not retroactive for death sentences imposed in cases prior to the passing of the law, which reinstated the death penalty for Leavitt and several other cases of the condemned who received similar reprieves like Leavitt. Nonetheless, Leavitt was allowed to continue any further appeals against the death penalty.

On June 28, 2005, the Idaho Supreme Court upheld the death sentence of Leavitt and rejected his appeal after finding that his request to be sentenced by a jury but not a judge was a matter he repeatedly rehashed and brought before the courts, which all dismissed the arguments. This decision was later overturned by the Idaho Supreme Court after a review, and it similarly ended with a separate decision that upheld the death penalty for Leavitt.

On May 14, 2012, the U.S. Supreme Court rejected Leavitt's final appeal.

== Death warrant and execution ==
On May 17, 2012, a death warrant was approved for Richard Leavitt, whose death sentence was scheduled to be carried out on June 12, 2012. 7th District Judge Jon Shindurling signed the death warrant just three days after the U.S. Supreme Court rejected Leavitt's final appeal.

As a final recourse to avoid the death penalty, Leavitt filed last-ditch appeals to oppose his execution. On May 25, 2012, Leavitt's counsel argued that a polygraph examination could prove that Leavitt was innocent and had never been present at the scene of the crime when Danette Elg was murdered, a stand that Leavitt maintained throughout his appeals. On May 30, 2012, District Judge Shindurling denied the request by Leavitt's lawyers to overturn the death warrant, stating that Leavitt had been accorded due process and he had no authority to stop the execution.

On June 8, 2012, the 9th Circuit Court of Appeals dismissed Leavitt's appeal and did not stave off his execution. On the eve of the execution, the U.S. Supreme Court turned down Leavitt's final appeal and allowed the execution to move forward.

On June 12, 2012, Richard Albert Leavitt, now 53, was formally put to death via lethal injection at Idaho Maximum Security Institution. For his last meal, Leavitt ordered baked chicken, french fries, and milk. He declined to make a final statement before his execution.

== Aftermath ==
At the time of Leavitt's execution, the murder of Danette Elg remained one of the worst crimes to happen in Blackfoot, Idaho. The community continued to remember the case due to its notoriety. Tom Moss, a former prosecutor of Bingham County, described the crime as the "ugliest crime scene" he had ever witnessed.

In 2018, an Idaho state court ordered the Idaho Department of Correction officials to release documents covering the details of drugs used in the state's two most recent executions, including Richard Leavitt's, due to the issue of maintaining secrecy of the death penalty states' use of drugs and how they obtained them.

According to official sources, Richard Leavitt was the third person to be executed by the state of Idaho since 1994, the same year when the state first resumed executions by carrying out the death penalty of Keith Wells, 18 years after the U.S. resumed the use of capital punishment in 1976. Leavitt was the second convicted killer to be executed in Idaho in seven months since November 2011, when Paul Ezra Rhoades was executed for killing three women in 1987.

After the execution of Leavitt, there was an indefinite pause on executions in Idaho for more than a decade due to the shortage of drugs for lethal injection executions and the refusal of pharmaceutical companies to sell their drugs for executions, making Leavitt the last death row inmate in Idaho to be executed since 2012. The drug supply problem prompted the government to pass a new law to allow firing squad executions in cases where the state is rendered incapable of conducting lethal injection executions due to drug shortages. Additionally, convicted killer Gerald Pizzuto Jr. was originally scheduled to be executed on March 23, 2023, but the execution was postponed due to the scarcity of drug supplies. This resulted in an indefinite stay of execution. Pizzuto was also diagnosed with a terminal illness while on death row.

In the subsequent years after the murder of Elg, Leavitt's two sons Travis and Timothy were convicted several times for rape. One of them, Travis, was sentenced in 2024 to a sentence of 25 to 50 years in prison for sexually assaulting and grooming a high school girl; he stated in his mitigation plea that the stigma of having a father in prison for murder influenced his life and led to him to become who he was. Timothy, who was released in 2022 on parole, had at one point served a prison term from February 2003 to April 2004 at the same prison as his father Richard Leavitt.

As of 2025, Leavitt remains the most recent person to be executed in Idaho.

== See also ==
- Capital punishment in Idaho
- List of most recent executions by jurisdiction
- List of people executed in Idaho
- List of people executed in the United States in 2012
- List of solved missing person cases (1980s)

Executions carried out in Idaho
Preceded by Paul Ezra Rhoades November 18, 2011	Richard Albert Leavitt; June 12, 2012	Succeeded by most recent
Executions carried out in the United States
Preceded by Henry Curtis Jackson Jr. – Mississippi June 5, 2012	Richard Albert Leavitt – Idaho; June 12, 2012	Succeeded by Jan Michael Brawner – Mississippi June 12, 2012
