= Ingrid Wilhite =

American filmmaker

- Born: May 4, 1959; Boise, Idaho
- Died: January 15, 2008 (aged 48); Berkeley, California
- Occupation(s): Filmmaker, musician

Ingrid Joy Wilhite (May 4, 1959 – January 15, 2008) was an American filmmaker and musician.

== Early life ==
Wilhite was born in Boise, Idaho and raised in Kuna, Idaho, the daughter of George Wesley Wilhite and Wilma Joy Ax Wilhite. She learned to play accordion as a child. She attended Rutgers University, where she created a comic, Pheminist Phunnies, for the Caellian, a campus publication, co-chaired the school's Gay and Lesbian Alliance, and graduated in 1982.

== Career ==
Wilhite moved to San Francisco after college, and worked in advertising, editing commercial videos. She wrote, directed and edited short independent films, often comedic, and mostly shown at gay and lesbian film festivals. Her film credits included Fun with a Sausage (1984), L'Ingenue (1985), It's a Lezzie Life: A Dyke-u-mentary (1987) The Lesbian Impress Card (1990), Pet Names, Mister Sisters (1994), A Religious Experience (1997), Hooter Polka, and Radical Harmonies (2002). She also worked on Seen Anything Good Lately? (1997), a GLAAD documentary on television representations of lesbian, gay, bisexual, and transgender people, and made an educational video on cat adoption, Whisker Tips. Writer Kate Bornstein described Wilhite in 1991 as "my favorite lesbo laughmaker".

Wilhite played accordion in a musical duo, Cabaret Tormento.

== Awards ==
Wilhite was a second-place winner at the Idaho State Accordion Festival in 1967. Her Fun with a Sausage won an award in the Super 8 category at the 1983 San Francisco Gay and Lesbian Film Festival.

== Personal life and legacy ==
Wilhite died in Berkeley in 2007, from brain cancer, at the age of 48. She was survived by her partner, Saundra Symonds. Her master tapes and other materials are in the Outfest UCLA Legacy Project for LGBTQ Film Preservation.
