= Murder in Idaho law =

Aspect of Idaho criminal law

Murder in Idaho law constitutes the intentional killing, under circumstances defined by law, of people within or under the jurisdiction of the U.S. state of Idaho.

The United States Centers for Disease Control and Prevention reported that in the year 2021, the state had a murder rate somewhat below the median for the entire country.

== Definitions ==
Idaho has three homicide offenses in total, including the two degrees of murder. The most serious form of homicide, first-degree murder, constitutes the unlawful killing of a human being with malice aforethought or the intentional application of torture to a human being, which results in the death of a human being, with one of the following circumstances present:

- The murder was perpetrated by means of poison, lying in wait, torture, or willful, deliberate, or was premeditated.
- It was the murder of any peace officer, executive officer, officer of the court, fireman, judicial officer, or prosecuting attorney who was acting in the lawful discharge of an official duty.
- The murder is committed by a person under a sentence for murder of the first or second degree, including such persons on parole or probation from such sentence.
- The murder was committed in the perpetration of, or attempt to perpetrate, aggravated battery on a child under 12 years of age, arson, rape, robbery, burglary, kidnapping, mayhem, an act of terrorism, or the use of a weapon of mass destruction, biological weapon, or chemical weapon.
- The murder was committed by a person incarcerated in a prison upon a person employed by the prison, another inmate of the prison or a visitor to the prison.
- The murder was committed by a person while escaping or attempting to escape from a penal institution.

Second-degree murder consists of all murders without any of the above circumstances present.

First-degree murder is punishable by life in prison with the possibility of parole after at least 10 years, life-without-parole, or death. Second-degree murder is punished by 10 years to life-without-parole.

== Penalties ==
The sentences for homicide offenses in Idaho are listed below.

Offense	Mandatory sentence
Manslaughter	Up to 10 years in prison
Second-degree murder	10 years to life-without-parole
First-degree murder	Death or; Life imprisonment without the possibility of parole or; Life-with-parole after at least 10 years
