= Keith Wells =

American murderer (1962–1994)

- Born: Keith Eugene Wells; May 11, 1962; Moab, Utah, U.S.
- Died: January 6, 1994 (aged 31); Idaho Maximum Security Institution, Kuna, Idaho, U.S.
- Cause of death: Execution by lethal injection
- Convictions: First degree murder (2 counts); Armed robbery
- Penalty: Death (April 7, 1992)

Details
- Victims: John Justad, 23; Brandi Rains, 20
- Date: December 20, 1990

Keith Eugene Wells (May 11, 1962 – January 6, 1994) was an American murderer convicted of the 1990 murders of John Justad and Brandi Rains in Boise, Idaho. He was executed in 1994 by the state of Idaho at the Idaho Maximum Security Institution via lethal injection only one year and nine months after having been sentenced to death by Judge Gerald Schroeder. Wells was the first person to be executed in Idaho since Raymond Snowden was hanged in 1957 and only the tenth since Idaho gained statehood. He chose not to appeal the death sentence although it was appealed on his behalf. The United States Supreme Court rejected an appeal filed against his wishes.

== Early life ==
Keith Eugene Wells was born on May 11, 1962, in Moab, Utah, the sixth of eight children born to Paul and Loral Wells. He was raised in Pocatello, Idaho, by his family, who were close-knit Mormons. Wells started experimenting with alcohol and cigarettes at the age of 4 and was smoking pot by the age of 10 or 11. Court reports show that in his grade school years Wells got into trouble for fighting and truancy in addition to stealing money and household items from family and friends.

By the time Wells had reached ninth grade, he had a drug problem that cost him $200 a month for amphetamines and marijuana. By 14, he was regularly stealing to pay for his drug addiction. According to Wells, between 1975 and 1978, he was involved in a total of thirty thefts and assaults, resulting in his getting in trouble with the law or being arrested. Wells was first jailed at the age of 15 for vandalism. At age 17, he was imprisoned and later released but would not stay out of prison for long. He was in and out of prison a total of three times for various offenses.

== Murders ==
In December 1989, Wells, who by then was a convicted robber and parole violator, was paroled for the final time. A year later, he earned minimum supervision and was required to only meet with his parole officer once every six months.

Shortly after midnight on Thursday, December 20, 1990, customers entered the Rose Pub (604 N. Orchard St., 43.61°N 116.2433°W) in Boise. When no one came to serve them, they looked around the bar and found the bodies of two people in a back room, later identified as 23-year-old John Justad and 20-year-old Brandi Rains. Rains was the bartender at the tavern, while Justad, who worked for a local beer distributor, was a customer. Both had been beaten severely over the head with a blunt object and had been bludgeoned to death. At first, police believed robbery was the motive as money was missing from the cash register. It was then learned that the perpetrator had fled the bar through the back door and had left footprints in the snow. Police followed the footprints but lost them at a nearby intersection.

Following their discovery, both victims were taken to the nearby St. Alphonsus Regional Medical Center, where they died a short time later. Evidence suggested Justad had fought back against his attacker. Boise police later released a drawing of a man who was being sought for questioning.

== Arrest and trial ==
Four months later on April 23, 1991, Wells was arrested and charged with two counts of first degree murder in the slayings of Justad and Rains. A judge ordered that he be held without bail and set a preliminary hearing for May 8. The preliminary hearing began on June 5. A police detective testified that Wells had confessed on two occasions to killing both victims at the bar.

Wells changed his story multiple times. According to the detective, Wells initially claimed that he beat both victims to death because they owed him $3,000 for cocaine. However, he later told the detective he had lied and changed his story, this time claiming that he went to the bar with two other people who were his cocaine suppliers. He claimed he retrieved money from Justad and returned it to his suppliers, who then told him he needed to return to the bar to get them more money. He then entered the bar with the suppliers, who hit Justad with a baseball bat multiple times until he was dead and handed Wells the weapon. He claimed the suppliers were the real killers.

During the week of June 10, 1991, Wells pleaded innocent in 4th District Court to both murders. His trial began on October 15 with a jury consisting of seven women and five men. On October 24, the jury found Wells guilty, and he was convicted on two counts of first degree murder. On April 7, 1992, District Judge Gerald F. Schroeder sentenced Wells to death.

== Appeals and confession ==
In February 1993, Wells asked to drop all his appeals in court and allow his execution to proceed. He said he did not want to spend the remainder of his life in a cell and had already tried to commit suicide following the murder conviction. He also maintained that delaying his execution would only cause pain to his own family as well as the families of his victims.

He eventually confessed to the crime and admitted to the real reason behind the killings. From death row, Wells did a telephone interview claiming he wanted to clean his conscience and admit the truth. At the time of the murders, Wells had been on parole for armed robbery and was full of frustration and anger. According to Wells, he left his home on the night of December 19, 1990, knowing that he would kill someone that night. He had no real reason for selecting his victims but admitted neither had provoked nor angered him. He arrived at the Boise Rose Pub armed with a baseball bat which he left at the back of the bar upon arrival. After spending over two hours at the tavern, he retrieved the baseball bat and bludgeoned Justad and Rains. First, he killed Justad as he came out of the bathroom. He then turned on Rains when she came to see what was happening. He later disposed of the bat by burning it in a fireplace. He stated "it was time for them to die."

== Execution ==
In the early hours of January 6, 1994, Wells was executed via lethal injection at the Idaho Maximum Security Institution in Kuna. Ninety minutes before the execution began, he apologized to the families of his victims for the first time. The execution began at 12:40 a.m. and Wells was pronounced dead at 12:50 a.m. He had no official final words. His last meal consisted of whole lobster, well-done prime rib, fried potatoes, salad with tomatoes and onions and Italian dressing, two pints of ice cream, a half gallon of milk, a two-liter bottle of soda and two apple fritters. It was the state of Idaho's first execution since October 18, 1957, when Raymond Allen Snowden was hanged for murder. It was the first execution to occur in Idaho since the reinstatement of capital punishment in 1976 as well as the state's first execution via lethal injection.

For nearly eighteen years, Wells remained the only person to be executed in Idaho since the reinstatement of the death penalty. The next execution in Idaho did not occur until 2011, when Paul Ezra Rhoades, a convicted spree killer, was executed, also by lethal injection. Wells is one of only three people to be executed in Idaho since the reinstatement of the death penalty and is the only one to have been executed voluntarily.

== See also ==
- Capital punishment in Idaho
- Capital punishment in the United States
- List of people executed in Idaho
- List of people executed in the United States in 1994
- Volunteer (capital punishment)

Preceded by Raymond Allen Snowden – 1957	Executions carried out in Idaho	Succeeded by Paul Ezra Rhoades – 2011
