= Kuna Caves =

Lava tube cave in Idaho, USA

Coordinates: 43.4121°N 116.4497°W

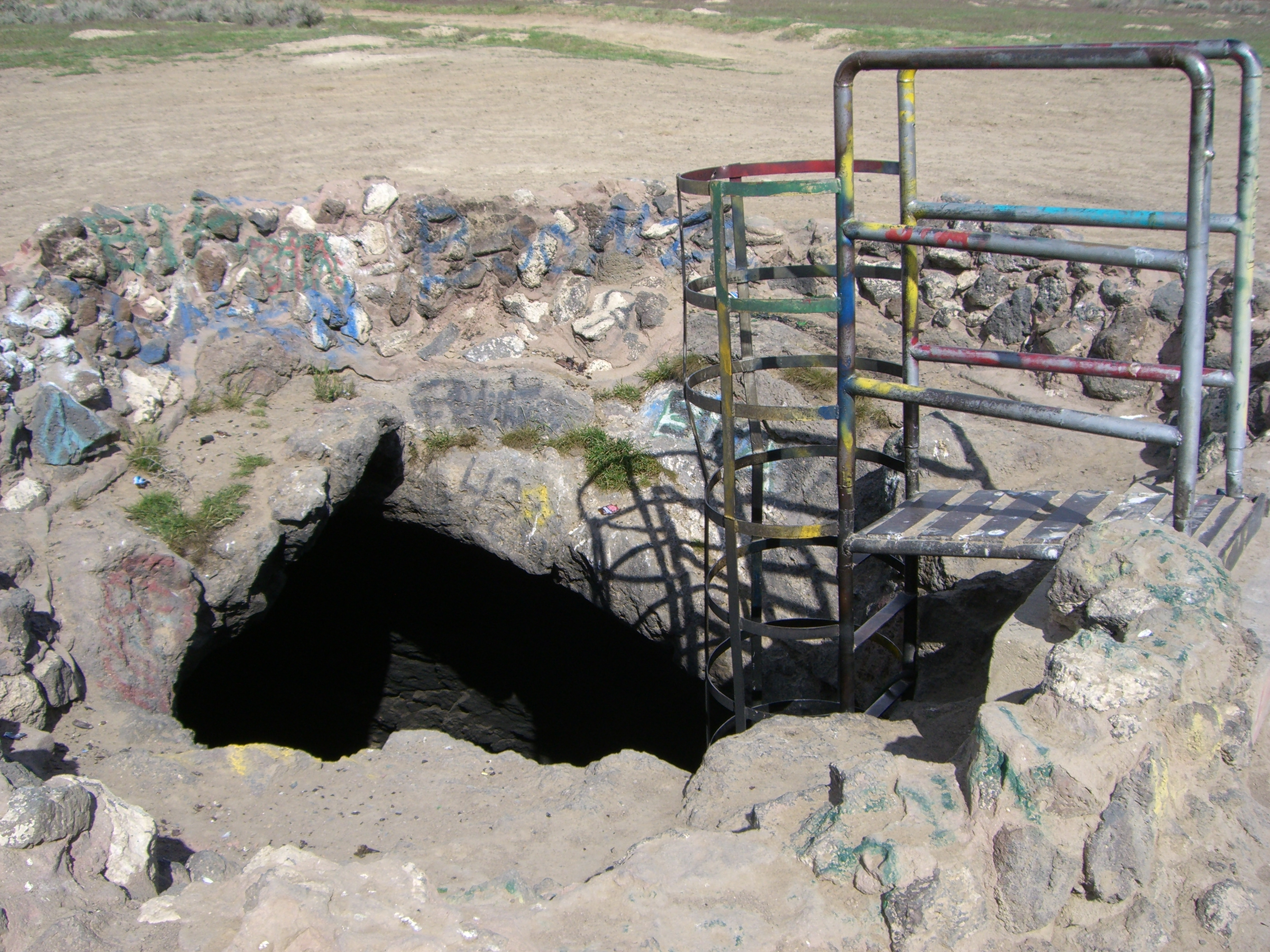
Kuna Cave Entrance

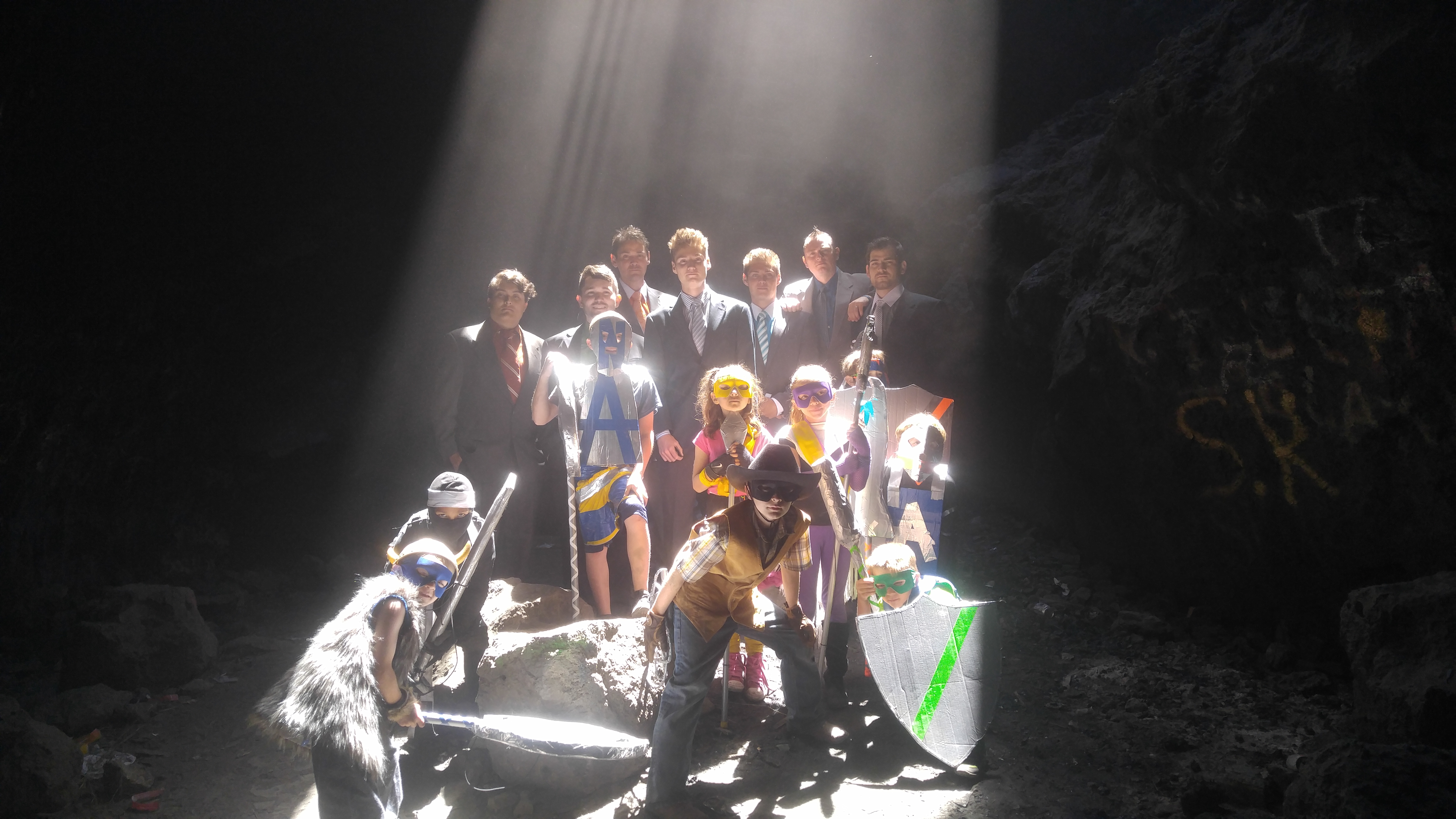
A group of children and young adults gather under the entrance of the Kuna Caves during noon, where the sun shines down on the cave from the entrance.

The Kuna Caves (or Kuna Cave) is a lava tube cave south of Kuna, Idaho with a public entrance, an opening in the ground with a caged ladder leading down into the main cavern.

== Background ==
The cave is about 50 feet (15 m) deep and runs about a quarter mile north and around 1,000 feet (300 m) south from the entrance. The southern portion of the cave requires crawling through a trench dug out of the clay floor of the cave leading to a small space approximately 3 feet (0.91 m) wide by 3 feet (0.91 m) tall by 4 feet (1.2 m) long in which you can turn around to return to the main [cavern]. The interior temperature of the cave hovers around 56 °F (13 °C) year round. A logbook was placed deep in the North end of the cave for people to sign in 2018.

== Local Culture ==
According to locals, at one time the system had been much larger and was composed of multiple caves, even stretching to the Snake River, before the United States Army Corps of Engineers blocked it off by detonating dynamite, collapsing a portion of the cave.

== Controversy ==
The official Bureau of Land Management stance on the cave is that it should not be visited by the general public. Traveling to the caves involves driving along a short dirt road, that is often very muddy, leading to the cave from Kuna Cave Road. Although the entrance has a ladder to get down into the cavern, it is not maintained. The cave itself is littered with graffiti, trash, and ash from fires started by visitors, leading officials to consider restricting access to the caves and sparking local demand for conservation of the caves.

In 2021, the Bureau of Land Management performed an environmental assessment and proposed a draft for a "Kuna Cave Recreation Site Improvement Project", which would improve public facilities by adding a road leading to the caves, a parking lot, an improved ladder, and a new grate to deter vandalism.
