= Capital punishment in Idaho =

Capital punishment is a legal penalty in the U.S. state of Idaho.

== Legal process ==
When the prosecution seeks the death penalty, the sentence is decided by the jury and must be unanimous.

In case of a hung jury during the penalty phase of the trial, a life sentence is issued, even if a single juror opposed death (there is no retrial).

The power of clemency belongs to the Idaho Commission of Pardons and Parole.

The primary method is a firing squad to carry out a capital sentence, with lethal injection as the backup if firing squad is found unconstitutional, unavailable, or if lethal injection is federally required.

== Capital crimes ==
First-degree murder can be punished with death if it involves any of the following aggravating factors:

1. The defendant was previously convicted of another murder;
2. At the time the murder was committed, the defendant also committed another murder;
3. The defendant knowingly created a great risk of death to many persons;
4. The murder was committed for remuneration or the promise of remuneration, or the defendant employed another to commit the murder for remuneration or the promise of remuneration;
5. The murder was especially heinous, atrocious or cruel, manifesting exceptional depravity;
6. By the murder, or circumstances surrounding its commission, the defendant exhibited utter disregard for human life;
7. The murder was committed in the perpetration of, or attempt to perpetrate, arson, rape, robbery, burglary, kidnapping or mayhem and the defendant killed, intended to kill, or acted with reckless indifference to human life;
8. The murder was committed in the perpetration of, or attempt to perpetrate, lewd and lascivious conduct with a minor, sexual abuse of a child under 16 years of age, ritualized abuse of a child, sexual exploitation of a child, sexual battery of a minor child 16 or 17 years of age, or forcible sexual penetration by use of a foreign object, and the defendant killed, intended to kill, or acted with reckless indifference to human life;
9. The defendant, by his conduct, whether such conduct was before, during or after the commission of the murder at hand, has exhibited a propensity to commit murder which will probably constitute a continuing threat to society;
10. The murder was committed against a former or present peace officer, executive officer, officer of the court, judicial officer or prosecuting attorney because of the exercise of official duty or because of the victim's former or present official status;
11. The murder was committed against a witness or potential witness in a criminal or civil legal proceeding because of such proceeding.

Under Title 18, Chapter 45, Section 05 (4505) of the Idaho Statutes, the death penalty can also applied for kidnapping in the first-degree, provided that the kidnapping involved any of the following aggravating factors, though it is unenforceable under Kennedy v. Louisiana:

- The victim of the kidnapping was subjected by the kidnapper or those acting in concert with him to torture, maiming or the intentional infliction of grievous mental or physical injury;
- The defendant knowingly created a great risk of death to any person, including the kidnapped;
- The kidnapping was committed for remuneration or the promise of remuneration or the defendant employed another to commit the kidnapping for remuneration or the promise of remuneration;
- The kidnapping was especially heinous, atrocious or cruel, manifesting exceptional depravity; or
- The kidnapping was committed for the purpose of murdering or maiming a witness or potential witness in a judicial proceeding.

Idaho statutes provides the death penalty for perjury causing execution of an innocent person as well. The death penalty can be applied in any case for perjury causing execution of an innocent person and no aggravated factors have to be proven in order for the death penalty to be given.

== History and methods ==
Idaho Territory was created in 1863 and executed 14 men, all by hanging. With statehood in 1890, another twelve men were executed through 1957, all by hanging; Idaho has never executed a woman. There were no executions from 1958 to 1972, when the United States Supreme Court decision Furman v. Georgia struck down all death penalty statutes across the United States and created an effective moratorium on executions.

Idaho passed new statutes on July 7, 1973, and the 1976 case Gregg v. Georgia lifted the moratorium. Hanging was the state's sole method of execution between that time and the 1978 adoption of lethal injection by the state legislature. The firing squad was added by the legislature in 1982 as an alternative option to lethal injection. Never used, it was removed in 2009, which left lethal injection as the sole execution method.

In 1982, the Idaho Department of Corrections purchased a mobile home and converted it to serve as an execution chamber. This was used only once, for the execution of Keith Wells in 1994. The state introduced a new permanent execution chamber in 2011, which it used for the execution of Paul Ezra Rhoades that year and Richard Albert Leavitt in 2012.

On March 20, 2023, the legislature passed a bill to reintroduce the firing squad, given difficulties in obtaining lethal injection drugs, and Governor Brad Little signed it into law.

In 2024, Idaho saw moves to allow the death penalty for defendants convicted of child rape. It passed the Idaho House of Representatives with a 56–12 vote. However, it didn't pass the Idaho Senate.

On January 21, 2025, state lawmakers were considering a proposal to legislate the firing squad as the primary method of execution instead of lethal injection. The bill, which was co-sponsored by 16 Idaho Republican House lawmakers, subsequently advanced to the House in state legislature, where it swiftly passed by a majority vote of 58–11 on February 6, 2025. The bill was then passed on to the Idaho Senate, where the senate swiftly passed the bill by a majority vote of 28–7 on March 5, 2025. On March 12, 2025, Governor Brad Little signed the Bill, which officially legalized firing squad as the primary execution method in the state, with effect from July 1, 2026.

Idaho permits the death penalty for rape and sexual abuse of children younger than 12 years of age. On March 17, 2025, the Idaho House unanimously passed the bill, and on March 24, the Idaho Senate passed it 30–5, Governor Little formally signed it into law on March 27, and it will take effect on July 1. This law could ultimately challenge the precedent of Kennedy v. Louisiana.

== See also ==
- List of people executed in Idaho
- List of death row inmates in the United States § Idaho
- Crime in Idaho
- Law of Idaho
