= Kuna, Idaho =

City in Ada County, Idaho, United States

- City
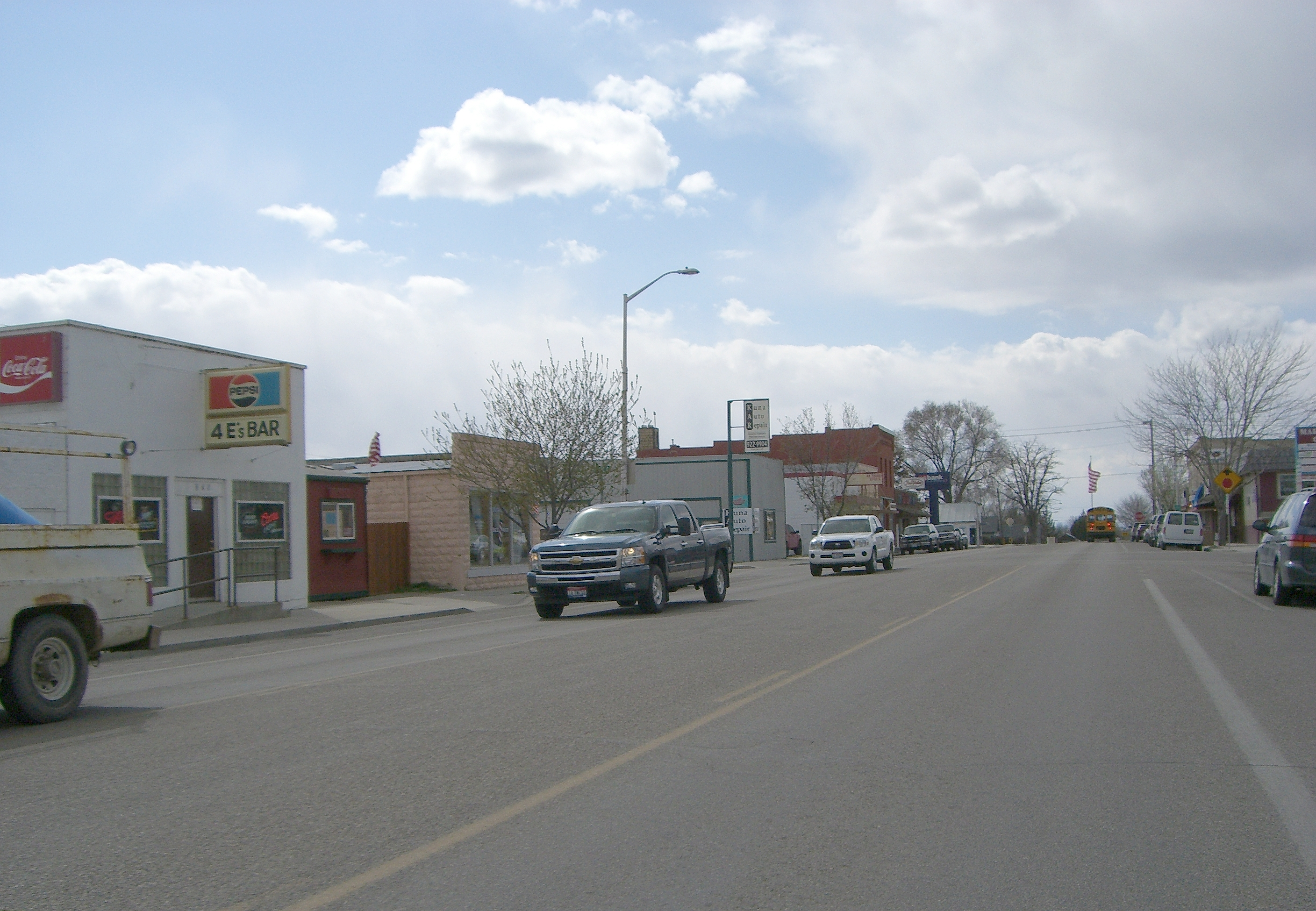
- Main Street in Kuna, April 2008

- Seal
- Motto: "Gateway to the Birds of Prey"
- Location of Kuna in Ada County, Idaho

- Location in the United States
- Coordinates: 43°29′25″N 116°22′18″W
- Country: United States
- State: Idaho
- County: Ada

Area
  - Total: 19.88 sq mi (51.49 km^{2})
  - Land: 19.78 sq mi (51.23 km^{2})
  - Water: 0.10 sq mi (0.26 km^{2})
- Elevation: 2,802 ft (854 m)

Population
  - Estimate (2025): 31,525
- Time zone: UTC−7 (Mountain)
  - Summer (DST): UTC−6 (Mountain)
- ZIP code: 83634
- Area codes: 208, 986
- FIPS code: 16-44290
- GNIS feature ID: 2411563
- Website: kunacity.id.gov

Kuna (/ˈkjuːnə/ KYOO-nə) is a city in Ada County, Idaho. It is part of the Boise metropolitan area. The population was 24,011 at the time of the 2020 census.

Kuna is one of the fastest-growing areas in Idaho, having nearly tripled in population between 2000 and 2010 and a nearly additional 60 percent gain between 2010 and 2020.

== History ==
Kuna originated as a railroad stop with coach transport to Boise. It is popularly believed, as cited by the Kuna Chamber of Commerce, that the translation of the name "Kuna" means "the end of the trail", but Charles S. Walgamott cites the origin of the name as a Shoshone Indian word meaning "green leaf, good to smoke."

The Western Heritage Historic Byway, designated as a national as well as a state scenic byway, travels around a number of historic sites in the area.

== Geography ==
Kuna's business center is approximately 18 miles (29 km) southwest of downtown Boise, the state capital.

According to the United States Census Bureau, the city has a total area of 18.18 square miles (47.09 km^{2}), of which 18.08 square miles (46.83 km^{2}) is land and 0.10 square miles (0.26 km^{2}) is water.

South of Kuna is the Kuna Caves, a lava tube.

A small seasonal creek, Indian Creek, runs through the city. It is now used as an irrigation canal, filled by the New York Canal from the Boise River Diversion Dam. One of the few small floatable waterways in the region, Indian Creek is a favorite swimming spot for local residents.

== Demographics ==
Historical population
Census	Pop.	Note	%±
1920	366		—
1930	398		8.7%
1940	443		11.3%
1950	534		20.5%
1960	516		−3.4%
1970	593		14.9%
1980	1,767		198.0%
1990	1,955		10.6%
2000	5,382		175.3%
2010	15,210		182.6%
2020	24,011		57.9%
2025 (est.)	31,525		31.3%
U.S. Decennial Census

=== 2020 census ===
As of the 2020 census, Kuna had a population of 24,011. The median age was 30.9 years. 31.8% of residents were under the age of 18 and 8.1% of residents were 65 years of age or older. For every 100 females there were 97.8 males, and for every 100 females age 18 and over there were 96.2 males age 18 and over.

97.1% of residents lived in urban areas, while 2.9% lived in rural areas.

There were 7,736 households in Kuna, of which 48.2% had children under the age of 18 living in them. Of all households, 62.3% were married-couple households, 11.6% were households with a male householder and no spouse or partner present, and 17.4% were households with a female householder and no spouse or partner present. About 13.9% of all households were made up of individuals and 4.6% had someone living alone who was 65 years of age or older.

There were 7,948 housing units, of which 2.7% were vacant. The homeowner vacancy rate was 0.8% and the rental vacancy rate was 5.9%.

As of the 2020 census, the median income for a household in the city was $68,017. Families had a median income of $75,296 versus $91,364 for married-couple families and $33,512 for nonfamily households. About 7.4% of those aged 18 to 64 years and 8.0% of the total population were below the poverty line, including 7.8% of those under age 18 and 14.5% of those age 65 or over.

Racial composition as of the 2020 census
Race	Number	Percent
White	20,261	84.4%
Black or African American	210	0.9%
American Indian and Alaska Native	168	0.7%
Asian	237	1.0%
Native Hawaiian and Other Pacific Islander	31	0.1%
Some other race	996	4.1%
Two or more races	2,108	8.8%
Hispanic or Latino (of any race)	2,703	11.3%

=== 2010 census ===
As of the census of 2010, there were 15,210 people, 4,782 households, and 3,838 families residing in the city. The population density was 841.3 inhabitants per square mile (324.8/km^{2}). There were 5,108 housing units at an average density of 282.5 units per square mile (109.1 units/km^{2}). The racial makeup of the city was 91.2% White, 0.6% African American, 0.8% Native American, 0.7% Asian, 0.1% Pacific Islander, 3.6% from other races, and 2.9% from two or more races. Hispanic or Latino people of any race were 8.6% of the population.

There were 4,782 households, of which 56.1% had children under the age of 18 living with them, 63.3% were married couples living together, 11.9% had a female householder with no husband present, 5.1% had a male householder with no wife present, and 19.7% were non-families. 14.8% of all households were made up of individuals, and 3.9% had someone living alone who was 65 years of age or older. The average household size was 3.18 and the average family size was 3.53.

The median age in the city was 28.1 years. 37.7% of residents were under the age of 18; 7.4% were between the ages of 18 and 24; 35.1% were from 25 to 44; 15.3% were from 45 to 64; and 4.4% were 65 years of age or older. The gender makeup of the city was 49.9% male and 50.1% female.

== Arts and culture ==
During the first weekend in August, there is an annual celebration called Kuna Days. Regular festivities include vendors in the park, live music at the bandshell, a free kids carnival, a rubber duck race in Indian Creek, a BBQ fundraiser at the fire station, a parade, a street dance, and a fireworks show.

The Snake River Birds of Prey Festival is held every year in mid-May. Taking advantage of the nearby Morley Nelson Snake River Birds of Prey National Conservation Area, which holds North America's densest population of nesting raptors, it offers lectures and tours about raptors, as well as about local history.

== Parks and recreation ==
In the city center is Colonel Bernard Fisher Veteran's Memorial Park, named for one of the city's residents.

== Media ==
The 1995 independent film Not This Part of the World was filmed near Kuna.

== Notable people ==
- Bernard Fisher, awarded the Medal of Honor
- Robin Fontes, Army Major general and highest-ranking woman in Afghanistan
- Bill Sali, former member of the United States House of Representatives
- Ingrid Wilhite, filmmaker

== In popular culture ==
Angle of Repose, the 1972 the Pulitzer Prize winning novel by American author Wallace Stegner is partially set in Kuna and includes the line, "I wish I could make you feel a place like Kuna. It is a place where silence closes about you".

== See also ==
- List of cities in Idaho
