= William Anderson =

William Anderson may refer to:

== Arts and entertainment ==
=== Music ===
- W. H. Anderson (1882–1955), Canadian composer, choir director, singer, and voice teacher
- William K. Anderson, background music composer for My Little Pony: Friendship Is Magic
- Cat Anderson (William Alonzo Anderson, 1916–1981), American jazz trumpeter
- Bill Anderson (born 1937), American country music singer, songwriter, and game show host
- William Anderson (guitarist) (born 1962), American classical guitarist and composer
- Will Anderson (singer) (born 1986), lead vocalist in the band Parachute

=== Writing ===
- William Anderson (bookseller) (1743–1830), bookseller and five times Provost of Stirling
- William Anderson (Scottish writer) (1805–1866), Scottish writer, poet, editor and author of The Scottish Nation
- William J. Anderson (1811–?), American who wrote a narrative describing his life as a slave
- William Charles Anderson (1920–2003), American author
- William Anderson (American writer) (born 1952), American biographer, specializing on Laura Ingalls Wilder

=== Other people in arts and entertainment ===
- William Anderson (artist) (1757–1837), painter of marine and historical paintings
- William Anderson (theatre) (1868–1940), Australian stage entrepreneur
- William Anderson (1911–1986), American actor, better known as Leif Erickson
- Bill Anderson (producer) (1911–1997), American producer
- William West Anderson (1928–2017), known as Adam West, American actor, played Batman from 1966 to 1968
- William M. Anderson (1948–2022), Northern Irish film editor
- Wil Anderson (born 1974), Australian comedian
- Will Anderson (animator), Scottish film animator
- William Smith Anderson (1878–1929), Scottish painter

== Law and politics ==
=== Australia ===
- William Anderson (Victorian politician, born 1828) (1828–1909), Scottish-born Victorian colonial politician, member for Villiers and Heytesbury
- William Anderson (Victorian politician, born 1853) (1853–1898), Victorian colonial politician for Creswick, and Windermere
- William Anderson (Tasmanian politician) (1904–1990), Australian politician from Tasmania
- William Acland Douglas Anderson (1829–1882), English-born politician and goldfields commissioner in colonial Victoria

=== Canada ===
- William Stafford Anderson (1884–1980), politician in New Brunswick
- William Anderson (Ontario MPP) (1822–1897), Canadian politician
- William Anderson (Ontario MP) (1905–1961), member of Canadian House of Commons for Waterloo South electoral district
- William A. Anderson (Canadian politician) (1837–1908), Canadian politician, Ontario MPP
- William Alfred Anderson, Canadian politician, Ontario MPP

=== U.S. ===
- William Anderson (naval officer) (1921–2007), U.S. representative from Tennessee
- William Anderson (Pennsylvania politician) (1762–1829), U.S. congressman from Pennsylvania
- William Anderson (Vermont politician) (1874–1959), member of the Vermont House of Representatives
- William A. Anderson (1873–1954), mayor of Minneapolis, Minnesota
- William Alexander Anderson (1842–1930), Virginia lawyer and politician
- William B. Anderson (1830–1901), U.S. representative from Illinois
- William Clayton Anderson (1826–1861), U.S. representative from Kentucky
- William Coleman Anderson (1853–1902), U.S. representative from Tennessee
- William Dozier Anderson (1862–1952), Mississippi Supreme Court justice
- William Gilbert Anderson (1860–1947), American pioneer of physical education
- William Hamilton Anderson (1874–c. 1959), superintendent of the New York Anti-Saloon League
- William Marshall Anderson (1807–1881), American scholar, explorer and politician
- Bill Anderson (West Virginia politician) (born 1948), member of the West Virginia House of Delegates
- Bill Anderson (Iowa politician) (born 1977), Republican politician and legislator from the state of Iowa
- Bill Anderson (Ohio politician), former member of the Ohio House of Representatives

=== Elsewhere ===
- William Spencer Anderson (c. 1832–1872), American-born Liberian politician and explorer
- William Anderson (British politician) (1877–1919), British socialist politician
- William Anderson (New Zealand politician) (1888–1978), mayor of Queenstown, New Zealand

== Medicine ==
- William Anderson (collector) (1842–1900), British surgeon and collector of Japanese art who first described Anderson-Fabry disease
- William G. Anderson (born 1927), American physician and social activist
- William Wallace Anderson, medical doctor involved in architecture of rammed earth construction in South Carolina

== Military ==
- William Anderson (1820–1848), British Army lieutenant with the 1st Bombay Fusiliers whose murder affected the Second Anglo-Sikh War
- William T. Anderson (1840–1864), American Civil War guerrilla commander, known as "Bloody Bill"
- William Anderson (Medal of Honor) (1852–1908), American sailor and Medal of Honor recipient
- William Herbert Anderson (1881–1918), Scottish recipient of the Victoria Cross
- William Anderson (VC) (1885–1915), Scottish recipient of the Victoria Cross
- William Anderson (RAAF officer) (1891–1975), Australian air marshal
- Maurice Anderson (1908–1986), often known as Bill Anderson, British Army medical officer
- William Anderson (Canadian Army officer) (1915–2000), Canadian general
- William Anderson (naval officer) (1921–2007), commander of the first nuclear submarine
- William Y. Anderson (1921–2011), Swedish American fighter ace of World War II
- William C. Anderson (Air Force) (born 1958), assistant secretary of the Air Force, 2005–2008
- William Lovett Anderson (1906–2004), US Navy submarine commander
- William J. Anderson (bodyguard), British soldier in the British Indian Army and bodyguard to Reginald Dyer

== Religion ==
- William Anderson (died 1543), one of the Perth Martyrs
- William Anderson (missionary) (1769–1852), English-Anglican missionary to South Africa
- William Anderson (minister) (1799–1873), Scottish theological writer and preacher
- William Franklin Anderson (1860–1944), American Methodist bishop
- William Harrison Anderson (1870–1950), American Seventh-Day Adventist missionary to Africa
- William Anderson (bishop of Salisbury) (1892–1972), Anglican bishop of Croydon, of Portsmouth and of Salisbury, England
- William Anderson (bishop of Caledonia) (born 1950), Canadian Anglican bishop since 2001
- William White Anderson (1888–1956), Scottish minister who served as Moderator of the General Assembly of the Church of Scotland

== Science ==
- William Anderson (naturalist) (1750–1778), naturalist on Captain Cook's third voyage (1776–1780)
- William Anderson (horticulturist) (1766–1846), Scottish horticulturist
- William James Anderson (1812–1873), Scottish physician who emigrated to Canada
- William Anderson (engineer) (1835–1898), British engineer and philanthropist
- William Henry Anderson (1908–1997), American entomologist
- William French Anderson (born 1936), American geneticist and molecular biologist

== Sports ==
=== American football ===
- Bill Anderson (American football, born 1921) (1921–1984), end
- Bill Anderson (American football, born 1925) (1925–2013), head football coach at Howard Payne University
- Bill Anderson (American football, born 1936) (1936–2017), tight end
- Bill Anderson (American football, born 1947), head football coach at North Park University and Illinois College
- Bill Anderson (American coach) (1891–1969), American football, basketball, and baseball coach
- Billy Anderson (quarterback) (1941–1996), led NCAA in passing in 1965
- Billy Anderson (halfback) (William Anderson, born 1929)
- Will Anderson (fullback) (1897–1982), running back
- Will Anderson Jr. (born 2001), defensive end
- Tim Anderson (defensive back) (William Tim Anderson, born 1949)

=== Association football ===
- Bill Anderson (English footballer) (1913–1986), manager of Football League side Lincoln City, 1946–1965
- William Anderson (English footballer) (1861–1903)
- William Anderson (Scottish footballer) (1862–?)
- Willie Anderson (footballer) (born 1947), English footballer for Aston Villa, Cardiff City

=== Baseball ===
- Bill Anderson (1880s pitcher) (1865–1936), American Major League Baseball player
- Bill Anderson (1920s pitcher) (1895–1983), American Major League Baseball player
- Bill Anderson (1940s pitcher) (1913–1971), American Negro league baseball player
- Bill Anderson (American coach) (1891–1969), American football, basketball, and baseball coach
- Bill Anderson (outfielder), American Negro league baseball player

=== Cricket ===
- William Anderson (cricket umpire) (1910–1975), South African Test match umpire in two games
- William Anderson (cricketer, born 1859) (1859–1943), French Olympic silver medal-winning cricketer
- William Anderson (cricketer, born 1871) (1871–1948), English cricketer
- William Anderson (Indian Army officer, born 1880) (1880–1958), English cricketer and British Indian Army officer
- William Anderson (cricketer, born 1909) (1909–1975), English cricketer
- William Anderson (Scottish cricketer) (1894–1973), Scottish cricketer from Fife

=== Other sports ===
- Bill Anderson (footballer, born 1878) (1878–1915), Australian rules footballer for St Kilda
- Bill Anderson (footballer, born 1911) (1911–1971), Australian rules footballer for Geelong
- Red Anderson (ice hockey) (Bill Anderson, 1910–1991), Canadian ice hockey player
- William Anderson (rugby union) (died 1892), New Zealand rugby union player
- William Anderson (ice hockey) (1901–1983), British ice hockey player who competed in the 1924 Winter Olympics
- Bill Anderson (Australian coach) (born 1948), Australian cricket and rugby league coach
- Bill Anderson (strongman) (1937–2019), Scottish sportsman
- Billy Anderson (Australian footballer) (William John Anderson, 1892–1954), Australian rules footballer
- William Anderson (cyclist) (1888–1928), Canadian Olympic cyclist
- William Anderson (athlete) (1878–1958), Irish athlete
- Will Anderson (Scrabble player) (born 1984), American Scrabble player

== Other people ==
- Chief William Anderson, namesake of Anderson, Indiana
- William Preston Anderson (1775–1831), Tennessee attorney, surveyor, soldier, land speculator
- William Caldwell Anderson (1804–1870), president of Miami University
- William Anderson (judge) (1847–1908), British barrister and colonial judge
- William P. Anderson (1851–1927), Canadian civil engineer
- W. B. Anderson (1877–1959), Scottish classicist and academic
- William Anderson (political scientist) (1888–1975), professor at University of Minnesota
- William S. Anderson (1919–2021), president and chairman of the National Cash Register Corp, 1972–1984
- William M. Anderson Jr. (born 1942), American academic and education administrator
- Eric Anderson (teacher) (William Kinloch Anderson, 1936–2020), Provost of Eton College, 2000–2009
- Bill Anderson (businessman) (born 1966), American business executive, chief executive officer of Bayer AG

== Other uses ==
- USS William G. Anderson, a barque used by the Union Navy during the American Civil Wa

== See also ==
- Billy Anderson (disambiguation)
- Willie Anderson (disambiguation)
- Bill Andersen (1924–2005), New Zealand communist and trade union leader
- Bill Andersen (politician), 1988 Republican candidate from Tennessee for the U.S. Senate
- William Andersen III, Canadian former politician in Labrador
