= William C. Anderson =

William C. Anderson may refer to:

- William Caldwell Anderson (1804–1870), President of Miami University
- William Charles Anderson (1920–2003), author of Bat*21 and U.S. Air Force Colonel during World War II
- William Clayton Anderson (1826–1861), United States Representative from Kentucky
- William Coleman Anderson (1853–1902), United States Representative from Tennessee
- William Crawford Anderson (1877–1919), British socialist politician
- William C. Anderson (Air Force) (born 1958), Assistant Secretary of the Air Force
- William C. Anderson, co-author with Zoé Samudzi of As Black as Resistance: Finding the Conditions for Liberation

== See also ==
- William Anderson (disambiguation)
