= Billy Anderson =

Billy Anderson may refer to:

- Broncho Billy Anderson (1880–1971), American actor and filmmaker
- Billy Anderson (halfback) (born 1929), American football player
- Billy Anderson (quarterback) (1941–1996), American football player
- Billy Anderson (Australian footballer) (1892–1954), Australian rules footballer
- Billy Dean Anderson (1934–1979), armed robber on the FBI Ten Most Wanted Fugitives list
- Billy Anderson (wrestler) (born 1956), American professional wrestler

== See also ==
- William Anderson (disambiguation)
- Wil Anderson (born 1974), Australian comedian, performing stand-up, as well as on television and radio
- Bill Andersen (1924–2005), New Zealand Communist and trade union leader
- Bill Andersen (politician), American political candidate
