= Elijah Anderson (Underground Railroad) =

Underground Railroad conductor

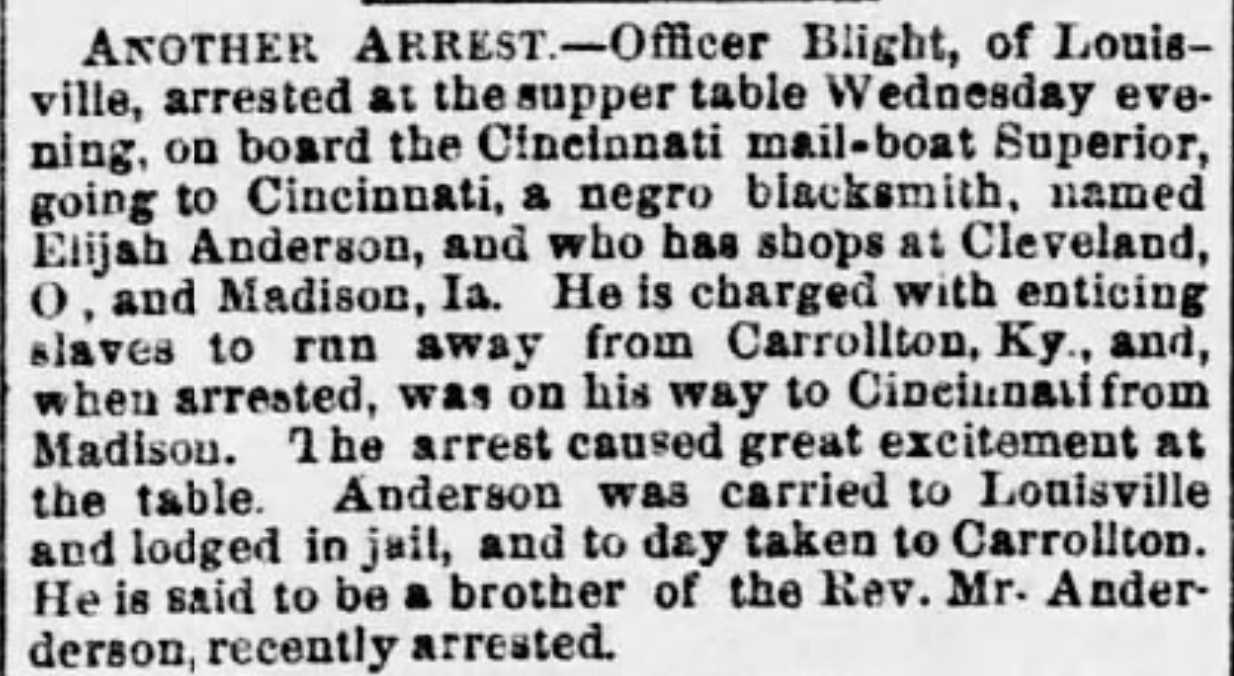
Report of Anderson's arrest with mention of his trade, December 1856

Elijah Anderson (c. 1808 –1861) was a free African-American man and leading conductor of the Underground Railroad (UGRR). According to other abolitionist such as Rush R. Sloane, Anderson assisted at least 1,000 slaves to gain freedom.

== Biography ==
=== Early life ===
Anderson grew up in Fluvanna County, Virginia, during a time when the state of Virginia was imposing especially harsh restrictions on free blacks as a response to various slave revolts, specifically, the Nat Turner's Rebellion. He later moved to Cincinnati, Ohio in his mid-20s and remained there until he married his wife, Mary. They had one daughter named Martha. Together, they settled in Madison, Indiana, between the years of 1835 and 1837. There, Anderson was able to earn a decent living through his work as a blacksmith. He had learned "how to make wrought-iron undercarriages and decorative fences." Both of these skills enabled him to "find work as a laborer fixing metal and steam fittings on steam boats."

=== Abolitionism ===
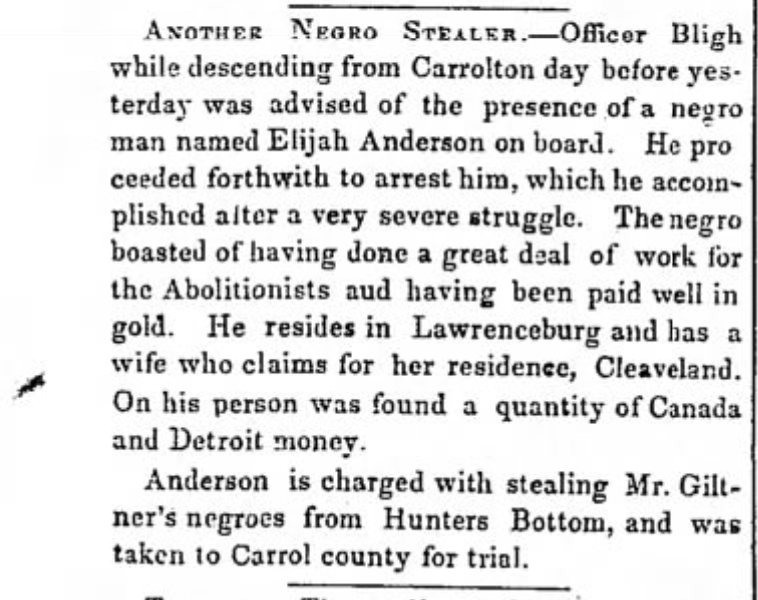
The Louisville Courier, December 19, 1856, Louisville, Kentucky

Both Elijah and Mary Anderson were described as light-skinned and white passing which allowed them a more secure lifestyle. During this time, he was able to involve himself in the active Underground Railroad organization present in Madison. Anderson became close friends with other free black people such as George De Baptiste, Chapman Harris, John Lott, and John Carter. He quickly found himself taking on a leadership role within the Madison Underground Railroad community who did "a great deal of work for the abolitionists."

He was referenced as the "general superintendent" of the Underground Railroad by fellow abolitionist Rush R. Sloane; He was, moreover, reported to have been able to open new routes and safe houses through which the protected passage of people pursuing freedom in Canada could take place. Anderson often entered Kentucky in order to communicate between enslaved and free black people and did so on many occasions via waterways, on vessels such as the Cincinnati mail-boat Superior. He was also known to communicate well with white abolitionists and free black activists in cities such Carrollton, Kentucky, Frankfort, Kentucky, and Lawrenceburg, Indiana. With these connections and individual purpose, he was able to energize the operations in Madison, Indiana.

In 1845, many of the established routes were compromised due to new abolitionist actors, and it became increasingly dangerous for enslaved people and conductors. John Simmons, a successful black abolitionist, was accused of having exposed the routes in exchange for money, but he emphatically denied this charge and sued his accusers. The leadership of the Underground Railroad in Madison was targeted and fined large sums of money, leading many to flee the state, including De Baptiste, Lott, and Harris. Other conductors were shot and drowned by pro-slavery mobs. Because of this violence and the imposed fines, Elijah and Mary decided to move to Lawrenceburg, Indiana. Once in Lawrenceburg, Anderson had determined that the established practice of bringing one, two, or three slaves at a time was quite ineffective. Instead, he believed, it would be much more productive to take larger groups of twenty to forty fugitives through the routes. Anderson took many of these escaped slaves to Cleveland, Ohio, but Sandusky, Ohio, was favored because of its distance to Canada and its position near the islands of Lake Erie. His blacksmithing skills are said to have helped him hammer code in messages between agents and escaped slaves.

It is estimated that throughout his involvement in the Underground Railroad, Elijah Anderson brought between eight hundred and one thousand slaves to freedom, most of which occurred following the passage of the Fugitive Slave Act of 1850. His success came to an end in the summer of 1856.

=== Imprisonment and murder ===
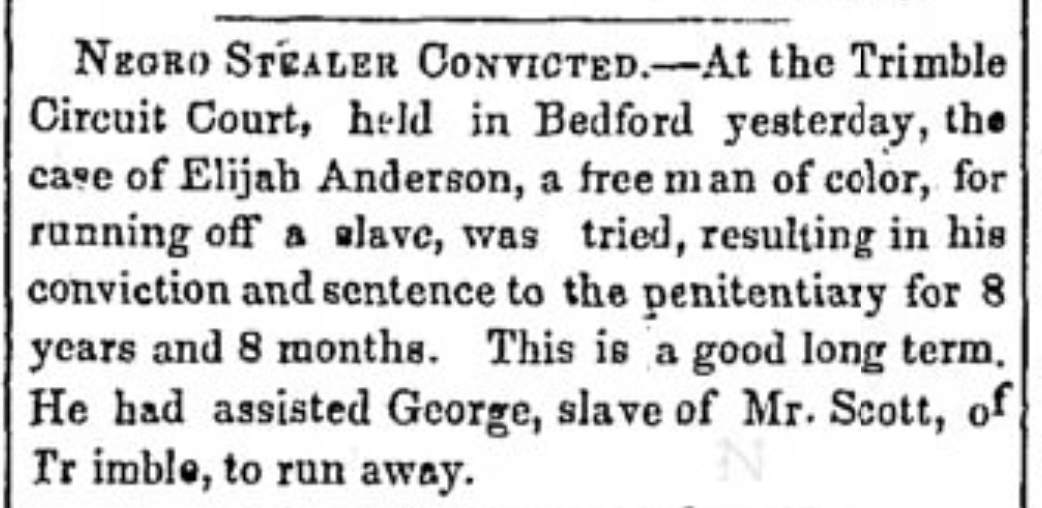
The Louisville Courier, June 19, 1857, Louisville, Kentucky

At this time, Anderson was guiding a group of escaped slaves to Cleveland, through the normal Underground Railroad routes. Once he successfully completed their passage, Anderson took a steam boat to Cincinnati. It was on this journey that he was spotted and identified. A few months later, an abolitionist activist, William J. Anderson was mistaken for Elijah Anderson on this journey and accused of aiding runaway slaves into Kentucky. William J. Anderson, once defended by an abolitionist lawyer, was released from custody. Elijah Anderson, however, was quickly recognized in his place and arrested by Delos Blythe of the Alan Pinkerton Detective Agency. He was accused of enticing slaves to leave their masters by General William O. Butler. After being acquitted of this charge, he was arrested once again in Bedford, Kentucky. There, Anderson was accused of aiding the escape of a boy named George.

Unfortunately, a letter that Elijah had written to his wife led to him being caught as showed proof that he and a group of other free black abolitionists were working together to free slaves. The strongest testimony against Anderson was that of Wright Ray. Ray was the head of a ring of slave catchers and he testified that he saw Anderson boarding the boat heading for Cincinnati, with the described runaway. Consequently, Anderson was sentenced to eight years and 8 months in prison in the Frankfort, Kentucky penitentiary. On June 18, 1857, the Louisville Daily Courirer wrote, "NEGRO STEALER CONVICTED-At the Trimble Circuit Court, held in Bedford yesterday, the case of Elijah Anderson, a free man of color, for running off a slave, was tried, resulting in his conviction and sentence the penitentiary for eight years and eight months. This is a good long term. He had assisted George, slave of Mr. Scott, of Trimble, to run away."

In April 1861, the day Anderson was supposed to be released from prison, Martha Anderson went to retrieve him from his cell. There, she found Anderson dead under suspicious circumstances. Some speculate that officials killed Anderson due to his prominent involvement in the UGRR, while others assume he died from natural causes. His body was ultimately released for a burial with friends and family. The home and blacksmith shop of Elijah Anderson in Madison, Indiana remains untouched as a historic building and safe house of the Underground Railroad. Wilbur Siebert, in his book The Underground Railroad from Slavery to Freedom and The Mysteries of Ohio's Underground Railroads, wrote "Elijah Anderson, a brave, and fearless colored man, was the general superintendent of the Underground system in this section of Ohio, and probably conducted more fugitives than any other dozen men up to the time he was arrested, tried, and convicted in Kentucky."
