= Horace Fletcher =

American health food enthusiast

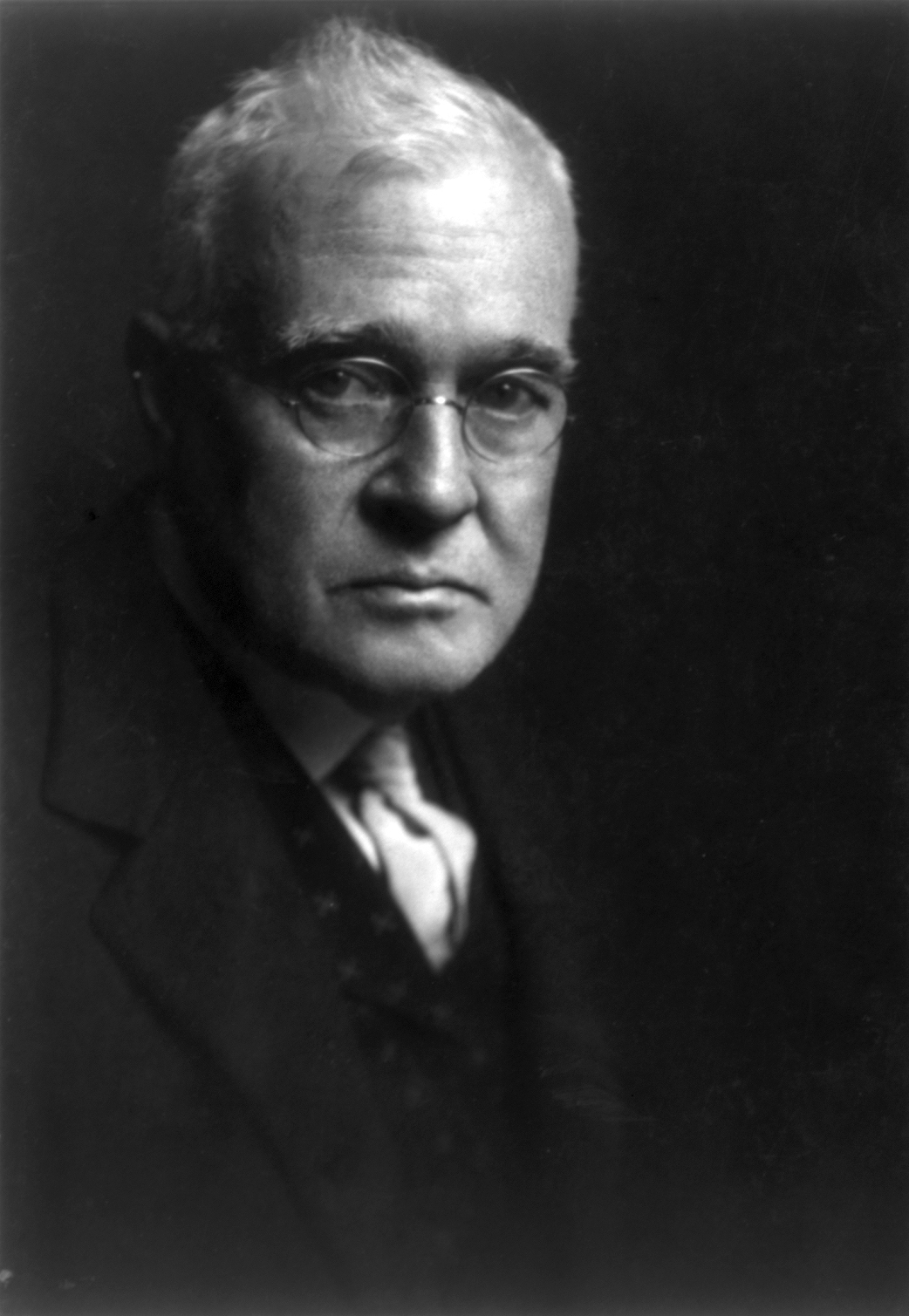
- Fletcher in 1908
- Born: August 10, 1849; Lawrence, Massachusetts, U.S.
- Died: January 13, 1919 (aged 69); Copenhagen, Denmark
- Occupation: Food writer

Horace Fletcher (August 10, 1849 – January 13, 1919) was an American food faddist who earned the nickname "The Great Masticator" for his argument that food should be chewed thoroughly until liquefied before swallowing: "Nature will castigate those who don't masticate." He made elaborate justifications for this claim.

== Biography ==
Fletcher was born August 10, 1849, at Haverhill Street in Lawrence, Massachusetts. He left home at sixteen and throughout his career worked as an artist, importer, manager of the New Orleans Opera House and writer. Fletcher suffered from dyspepsia and obesity in his later years, so he devised a system of chewing food to maximize digestion. His mastication system became known as "Fletcherism". He was a member of The Boston Club of New Orleans and founding member of The Bohemian Club of San Francisco.

Fletcher and his followers recited and followed his instructions religiously, even claiming that liquids, too, had to be chewed in order to be properly mixed with saliva. Fletcher argued that his mastication method will increase the amount of strength a person could have while actually decreasing the amount of food that he consumed. Fletcher promised that "Fletcherizing", as it became known, would turn "a pitiable glutton into an intelligent epicurean".

Fletcher also advised against eating before being "good and hungry", or while angry or sad. Fletcher would claim that knowing exactly what was in the food one consumed was important. In The New Glutton or Epicure, published in 1906, he stated that different foods have different waste materials, so knowing what type of waste one was going to have in one’s body was valuable knowledge, thus critical to one’s overall well being. He promoted his theories for decades on lecture circuits, and became a millionaire. Upton Sinclair, Henry James and John D. Rockefeller were among those who gave his ideas a try. James and Mark Twain were visitors to his residence in the Palazzo Saibante in Venice, where he lived with his wife, Grace Fletcher, an amateur painter, who studied in Paris in the 1870s and was influenced by the Impressionists, and her daughter, Ivy. Ivy, later to become a journalist at the Daily Express in the 1930s, was often a guinea pig for Horace's experiments, which she described in her unpublished memoirs Remember Me.

Fletcher inspired Russell Henry Chittenden of Yale University to test the efficacy of his mastication system. He was also tested by William Gilbert Anderson, director of the Yale Gymnasium. It was here that he participated, at the age of fifty-eight, in vigorous tests of strength and endurance versus the college athletes. The tests included: "deep-knee bending", holding out arms horizontally for a length of time, and calf raises on an intricate machine. Fletcher claimed to lift "three hundred pounds dead weight three hundred and fifty times with his right calf". The tests claim that Fletcher outperformed these Yale athletes in all events and that they were very impressed with his athletic ability at his old age. Fletcher attributed this to following his eating practices, and ultimately these tests, whether true or not, helped further endorse "Fletcherism" publicly.

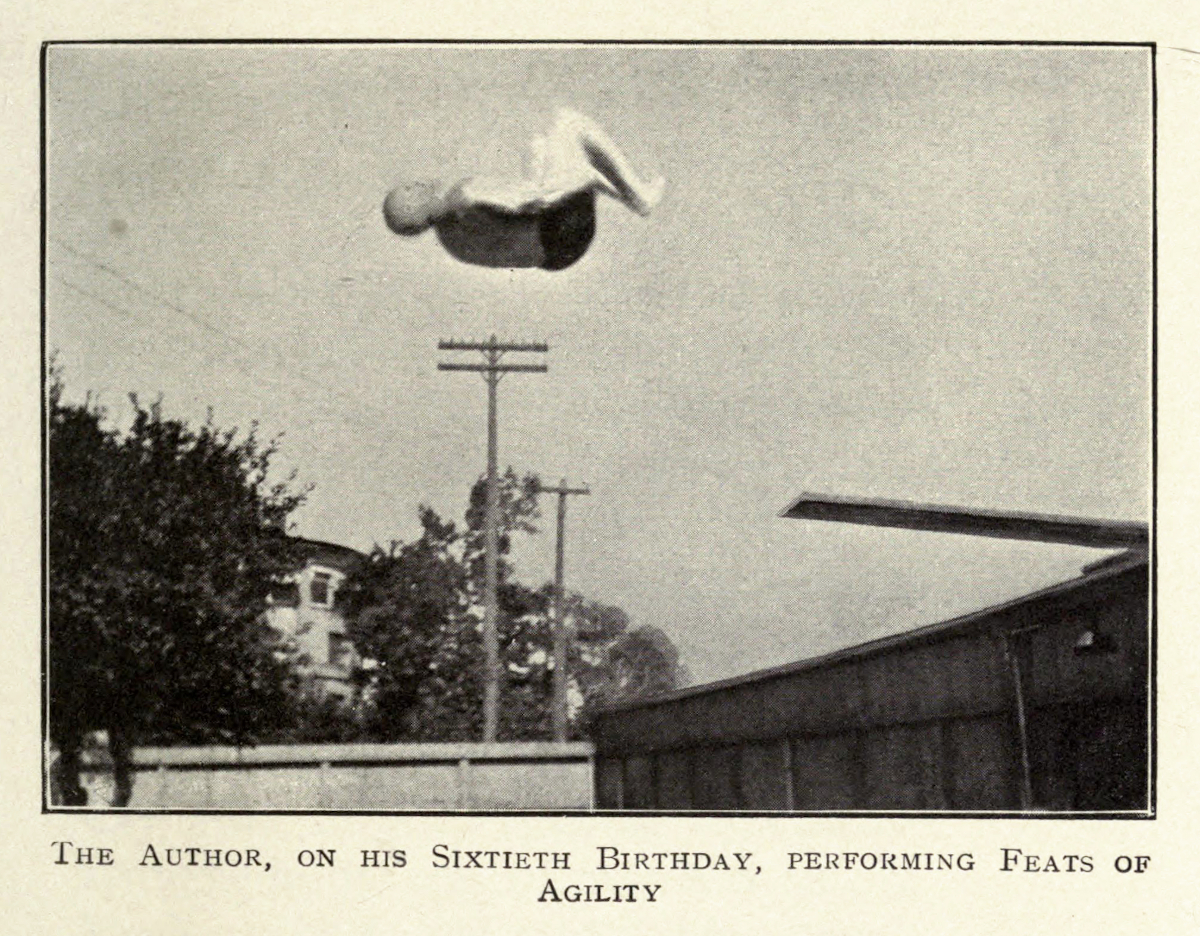
Fletcher, "performing feats of agility"

Fletcher saw many similarities between humans and functioning machines. He posited several analogies between machines and the human body. Just some of the comparisons that Fletcher drew included: fuel to food; steam to blood circulation; steam gauge to human pulse; and engine to heart.

Along with "Fletcherizing", Fletcher and his supporters advocated a low-protein diet as a means to health and well-being.

Fletcher had a special interest in human excreta. He believed that the only true indication of one’s nutrition was evidenced by excreta. Fletcher advocated teaching children to examine their excreta as a means for disease prevention. If one was in good health and maintained proper nutrition then their excreta, or digestive "ash", as Fletcher called it, should be entirely "inoffensive". By inoffensive, Fletcher meant that there was no stench and no evidence of bacterial decomposition.

Fletcher was an avid spokesman for Belgian Relief and a member of the Commission for Relief in Belgium during World War I.

Fletcher died of bronchitis in Copenhagen on January 13, 1919, at the age of 69. His message to humanity – to have an excellent overall health – was to have a holistic approach. The approach has only three steps:

1. Eat only when you have a good appetite.
2. Chew the food like pulp and drink that pulp. Do not swallow food.
3. Drink all the liquids and liquid food sip by sip. Do not drink in gulps.

== Reception ==
Although he acquired many followers, medical experts described Fletcher as a food faddist and promoter of quackery. He was a key figure of the American "Golden Age of Food Faddism". Critics described Fletcherism as a "chew-chew cult". Fletcher's extreme claims about chewing a mouthful of food up to one hundred times until it had no taste in order to avoid illness is not supported by scientific evidence. He also believed that his mastication system could cure alcoholism, anaemia, appendicitis, colitis and insanity.

Fletcher believed that his system could improve bowel movements; however, the bowel must have a certain amount of indigestible bulk to stimulate it to action. Health writer Carl Malmberg noted that Fletcher's extreme diet of chewed food was almost a liquid diet that does not provide "even a minute quantity of th[e] necessary bulk". For this reason, Fletcher's system is potentially dangerous and may be responsible for "constipation of the most serious kind".

Physician Morris Fishbein noted that the result of Fletcher's system was a "thorough disturbance of the entire body and the development of intoxication and general disability."

== Citations ==
- Fletcher, Horace (1913). Fletcherism, What It Is; Or, How I Became Young at Sixty. Harvard: Frederick A. Stokes Company.

== Publications ==
- Menticulture or the A–B–C of True Living (1896)
- Happiness as Found in Forethought Minus Fearthought (1898)
- The Last Waif, or Social Quarantine: A Brief (1898)
- The New Glutton or Epicure (1903)
- The A.B.–Z. of Our Own Nutrition (1903)
- Fletcherism, What It Is; Or, How I Became Young at Sixty (1913)
