= Hurricane (1974 film) =

1974 American television film

- Genre: Drama
- Based on: Hurricane Hunters by William Charles Anderson
- Story by: Jack Turley
- Directed by: Jerry Jameson
- Starring: Larry Hagman; Martin Milner; Jessica Walter; Will Geer; Michael Learned; Barry Sullivan; Frank Sutton
- Music by: Vic Mizzy
- Country of origin: United States
- Original language: English

Production
- Executive producer: Charles W. Fries
- Producer: Edward Montagne
- Cinematography: Matthew F. Leonetti
- Editor: Art Seid
- Running time: 74 min.
- Production companies: Montagne Productions; Metromedia Producers Corporation

Original release
- Network: ABC
- Release: September 10, 1974

Hurricane is a 1974 American TV film. It was an ABC Movie of the Week.

== Plot summary ==
The plot has several different storylines:

Early on in the film the weather designation changes from tropical storm to hurricane.

A married couple sailing on a boat who are caught up in the eye of the hurricane. Their lives are endangered when their boat runs out of fuel but are eventually saved by a surfacing US Navy submarine.

A young married couple who decide to leave their town which is in the hurricane's path. Although not shown it is presumed that they made the right decision and survived.

A pilot who is part of the crew of a military weather bureau storm plane. They are the ones who detect the boat trapped in the eye of the hurricane and relay a message to the submarine giving the boat's location. However the aircraft is destroyed killing all those on board by the high winds when it attempts to leave the hurricane.

A middle-aged married couple who stay put at home celebrating in a hurricane party. The house is later destroyed by a tornado and the wife perishes.

An old man who is rescued at a road in the middle of the storm. It later turns out that he is the father of the pilot of the weather storm plane.

At certain points throughout the film, telegraphic-style subtitles appear at the bottom of the screen showing the hurricane's name (Hilda), its location, wind speed and estimated direction path.

== Cast ==
- Larry Hagman as Paul Damon
- Martin Milner as Major Stoddard
- Jessica Walter as Louise Damon
- Barry Sullivan as Hank Stoddard
- Michael Learned as Lee Jackson
- Frank Sutton as Bert Pearson
- Will Geer as Dr McCutcheon
- Lonny Chapman as Pappy
- Patrick Duffy as Jim

== Reception ==
The Los Angeles Times called it "a mediocre disaster movie".
