= Old Idaho State Penitentiary =

Historical place and former prison in Idaho, United States

- Old Idaho Penitentiary State Historic Site
- U.S. National Register of Historic Places
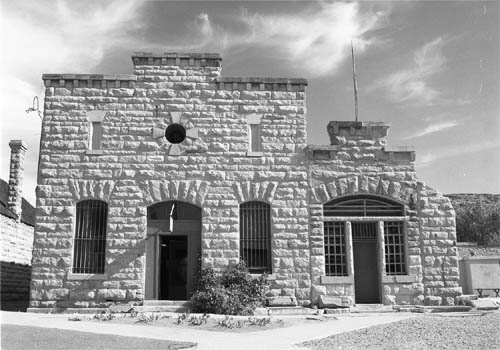
- A facade of the old penitentiary

- Location within the United States Location within Idaho
- Location: 2200 Warm Springs Ave. Boise, Idaho, U.S.
- Coordinates: 43.6027°N 116.162°W
- Area: 510 acres (2.1 km^{2})
- Built: 1870–1872; 154 years ago
- Architect: Inmates
- Architectural style: Romanesque
- NRHP reference No.: 74000729
- Added to NRHP: July 17, 1974

The Old Idaho Penitentiary State Historic Site was a functional prison from 1872 to 1973 in the western United States, east of Boise, Idaho. The first building, also known as the Territorial Prison, was constructed in the Territory of Idaho in 1870; the territory was seven years old when the prison was built, a full two decades before statehood.

From its beginnings as a single cell house, the penitentiary grew to a complex of several distinctive buildings surrounded by a 17-foot-high (5.2 m) sandstone wall. The stone was quarried from the nearby ridges by the resident convicts, who also assisted in later constructions.

Less than two miles (3 km) southeast of downtown Boise and near Table Rock, the Old Idaho Penitentiary is operated by the Idaho State Historical Society; the elevation of the site on Warm Springs Avenue is approximately 2,770 feet (845 m) above sea level.

Dennis, a kitten found in the prison barn by an inmate in 1952 was kept in the penitentiary for sixteen years. Guards allowed him to keep Dennis even though incarcerated men were not allowed pets. Dennis roamed the yard and made friends. The guards and inmates grew to love him. In 1968, Dennis died in his sleep. The inmates performed a funeral in his honor, even providing him a headstone. Dennis is the only "inmate" buried within the prison walls.

== Prison history ==
Over its 101 years of operation, the penitentiary received more than 13,000 inmates, with a maximum population of a little over 600. Two hundred and sixteen of the inmates were women. Two famous inmates were Harry Orchard and Lyda Southard. Orchard assassinated former Governor Frank Steunenberg in 1905; Southard was known as Idaho's Lady Bluebeard for killing several of her husbands to collect upon their life insurance.

Serious riots occurred in 1952 (May 24), 1971 (August 10), and 1973 (March 7–8) over living conditions in the prison. The 416 resident inmates were moved to the new state correctional institution south of Boise and the old penitentiary was closed on December 3, 1973.

Five years earlier in 1968, numerous prison trusties had escaped by walking away.

In 1992, the Idaho State Historical Society recorded oral history interviews with fifteen former prison guards. These tapes and transcripts cover prison operations and remembrances from the 1950s to the closing of the prison. The collection is open for research at the society.

=== Executions ===
The last six executions at this facility were by hanging:

- 1957 – Raymond Snowden (age 35), October 18
- 1951 – Ernest Walrath (20) and Troy Powell (21), April 13
- 1926 – John Jurko (41), July 9
- 1924 – Noah Arnold (32), December 19
- 1909 – Fred Seward (28), May 7

== Prison buildings ==
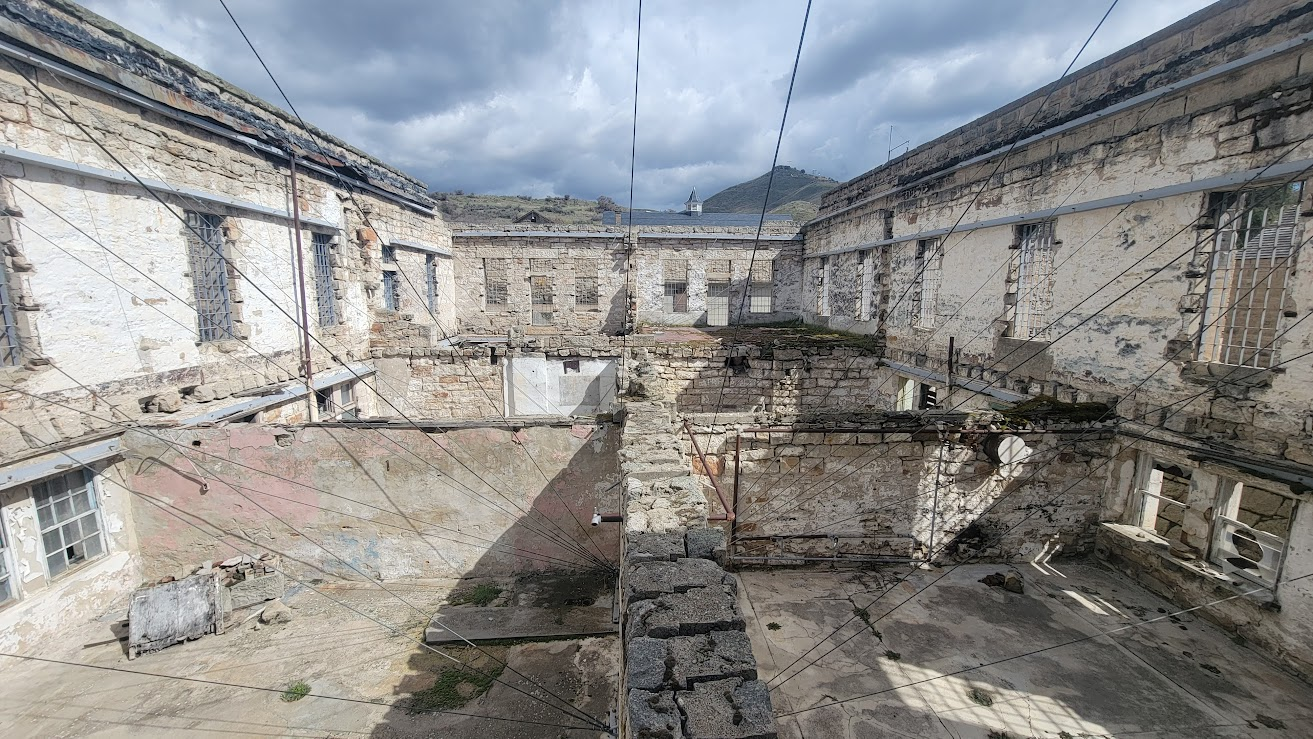
The dining hall of the penitentiary. Much of the building was burned in the riots. The lines in the photograph are cables used to hold the walls up.

The Territorial Prison was completed in 1872 and received its first 11 inmates from the Boise County Jail. This building was converted into a chapel in the 1930s and was destroyed by fire in the 1973 riot.

The New Cell House (1889–1890) consisted of three tiers of 42 steel cells. The third tier closest to the Rose Garden served as "Death Row."

The area now known as the Rose Garden (as this is what it is now) was once used to execute prisoners by hanging. Of the 10 executions in the Old State Penitentiary, six occurred here.

The Administration Building (1893–1894) housed the warden's office, armory, visitation room, control room, and turnkey area.

The False Front Building (1894–1895) held the commissary, trusty dorm, barber shop (1902–the 1960s), and hospital (originally the blacksmith shop, but was remodeled in 1912 and remained the prison hospital until the 1960s). The hospital was then converted into the social services office but burned down in the 1971 riot.

The Dining Hall (1898) was designed by George Hamilton (an inmate at the time) and burned down in the 1973 riot.

Cell House 2 (1899), also known as the North Wing, contained two-man cells. A honey bucket was placed in each cell to serve as a toilet. Inmates burned the building in the 1973 riot.

Cell House 3 (1899) was built the same as Cell House 2. It was eventually condemned for habitation, but in 1921 was converted into a shoe factory. In 1928, this building was remodeled for inmate occupancy and became the first cell house with indoor plumbing.

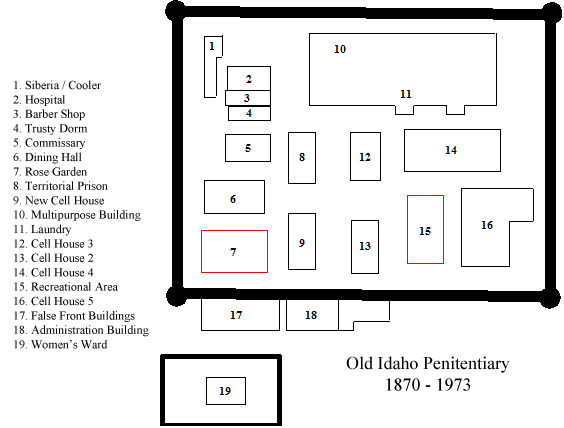
Layout of the penitentiary

The Women's Ward dormitory (1920) was built out of necessity. Prior to its completion, the women moved into the warden's old house in 1905. Previously women did not have separate quarters and several scandals forced their relocation. Male inmates built a wall around the old warden's home in 1906 to serve as a separate facility for women. This building had seven two-person cells, a central day room, kitchen, and bathroom facilities. This building held the infamous Lyda Southard.

Built by inmates, the Multipurpose Building (1923) served as a shirt factory, shoe shop, bakery, license plate shop, laundry, hobby room, loafing room, and housed the communal showers.

Solitary confinement consisted of two sections. The first, built in the early 1920s, was the Cooler. Although built for solitary confinement, each cell contained 4–6 men. The second section, known as Siberia, was built in 1926 and housed twelve 3-by-8-foot (0.9 m × 2.4 m) cells, with one inmate per cell.

Cell House 4 (1952) was the largest and most modern cell house at the penitentiary. Some inmates painted their cells and left drawings on the walls that can be seen today.

Cell House 5 (1954) was maximum security where the most unruly and violent offenders stayed. This building also served as a permanent place of solitary confinement. It includes a built-in gallows and "Death Row."

Although not a building, there is also an outdoor recreational area that is now the Idaho Botanical Gardens where inmates boxed and played baseball, basketball, handball, tennis, horseshoes, and football. The baseball, and later softball, team was named The Outlaws and frequently played teams from across the Treasure Valley. A baseball stadium was located in what is now referred to as "Outlaw Field" where the Botanical Gardens hosts outdoor concerts. The prison cemetery is located in the Botanical Gardens.

== Museum and Historical Society ==
The site was placed on the National Register of Historic Places in 1973 for its significance as a Territorial Prison. The site currently contains the buildings and cell houses with exhibits, the Idaho Merci Train boxcar, and the J. Curtis Earl Memorial Exhibit, all managed by the Idaho State Historical Society.

In late 1999, J.C. Earl donated his personal collection of historic arms and military memorabilia to the state of Idaho. These items were placed on exhibition in 2001 as the J. Curtis Earl Memorial Exhibit at the Old Idaho Penitentiary. They range from the Bronze Age to those used today for sport, law enforcement, and military purposes. The Luristan Bronze collection dates to about 1000–650 BC.

== In popular culture ==
The prison has become a popular site for ghost hunters. The Travel Channel's television show Destination Fear filmed at the location for the thirteenth episode of their second season. Ghost Adventures investigated the Old Idaho State Penitentiary for the eighth episode of their first season.

The Idaho State Historical Society also produces a podcast "Behind Gray Walls," which tells the stories of individual inmates.

== Gallery ==
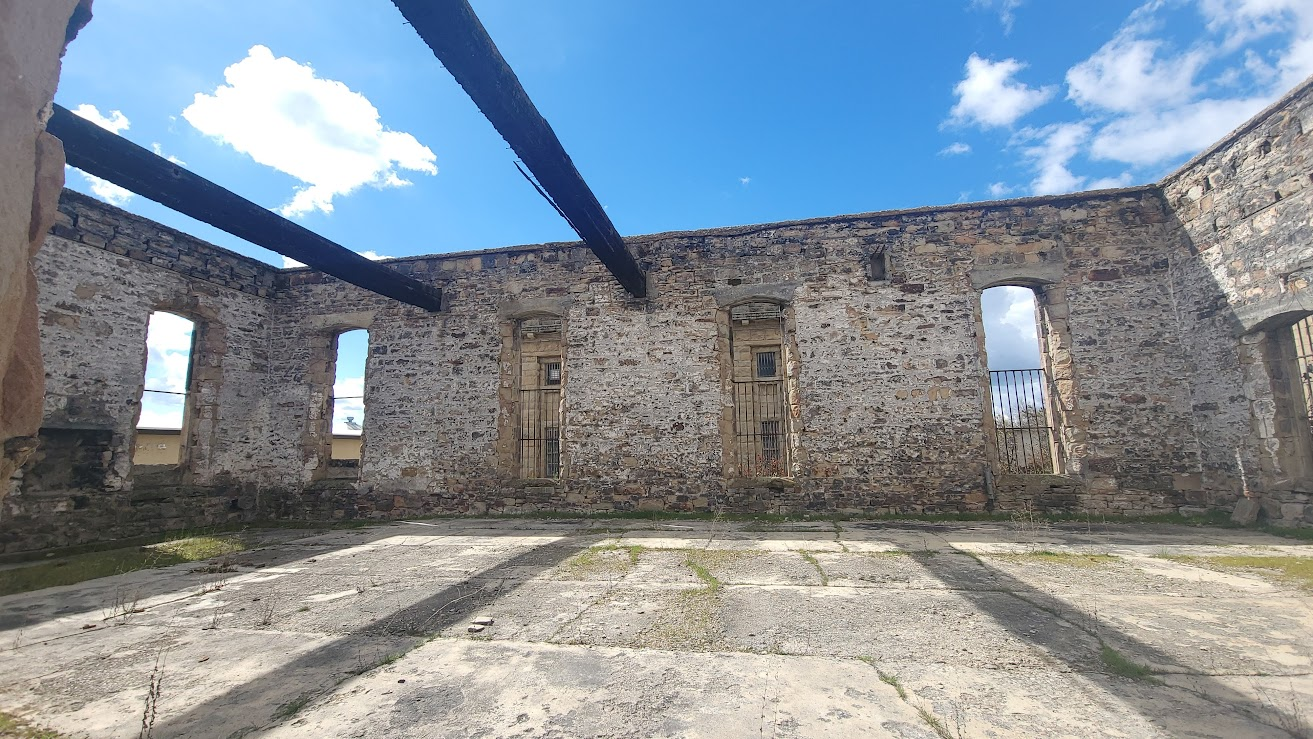
Remnants of the pen's chapel, burned during the riots.

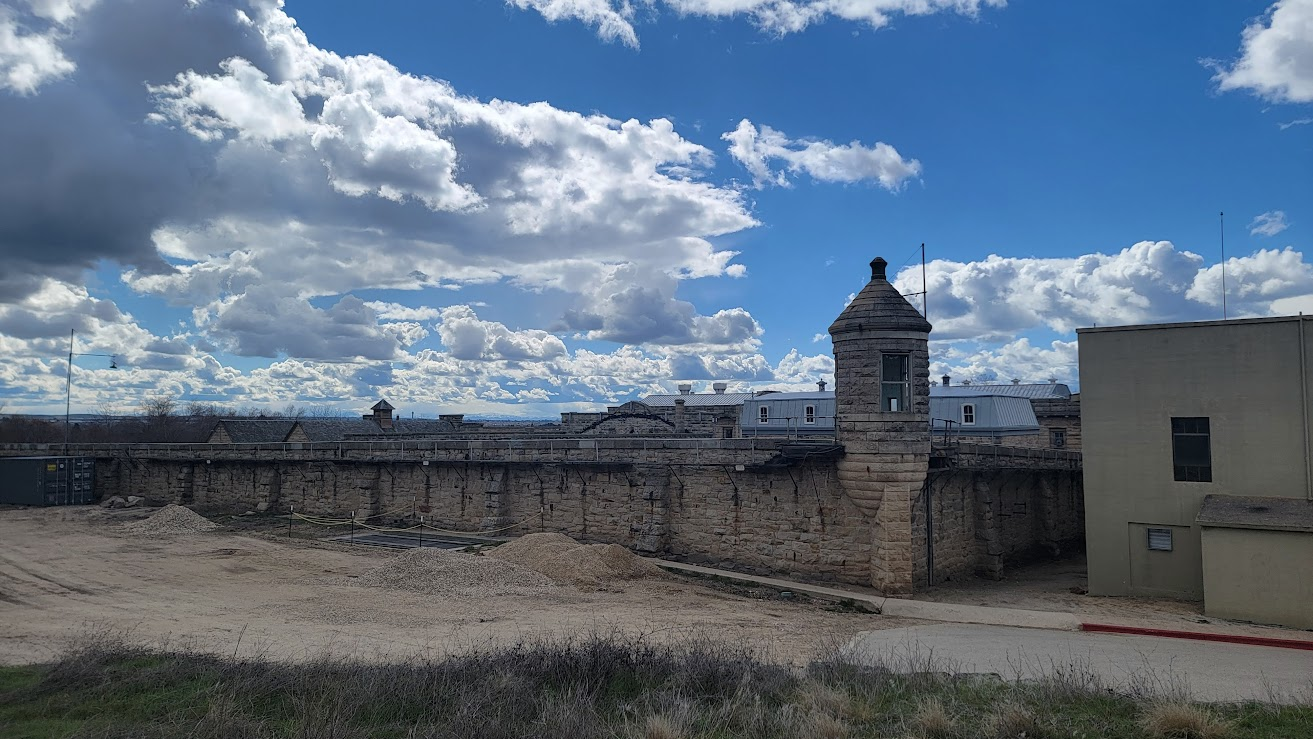
The Northeast corner of the penitentiary.

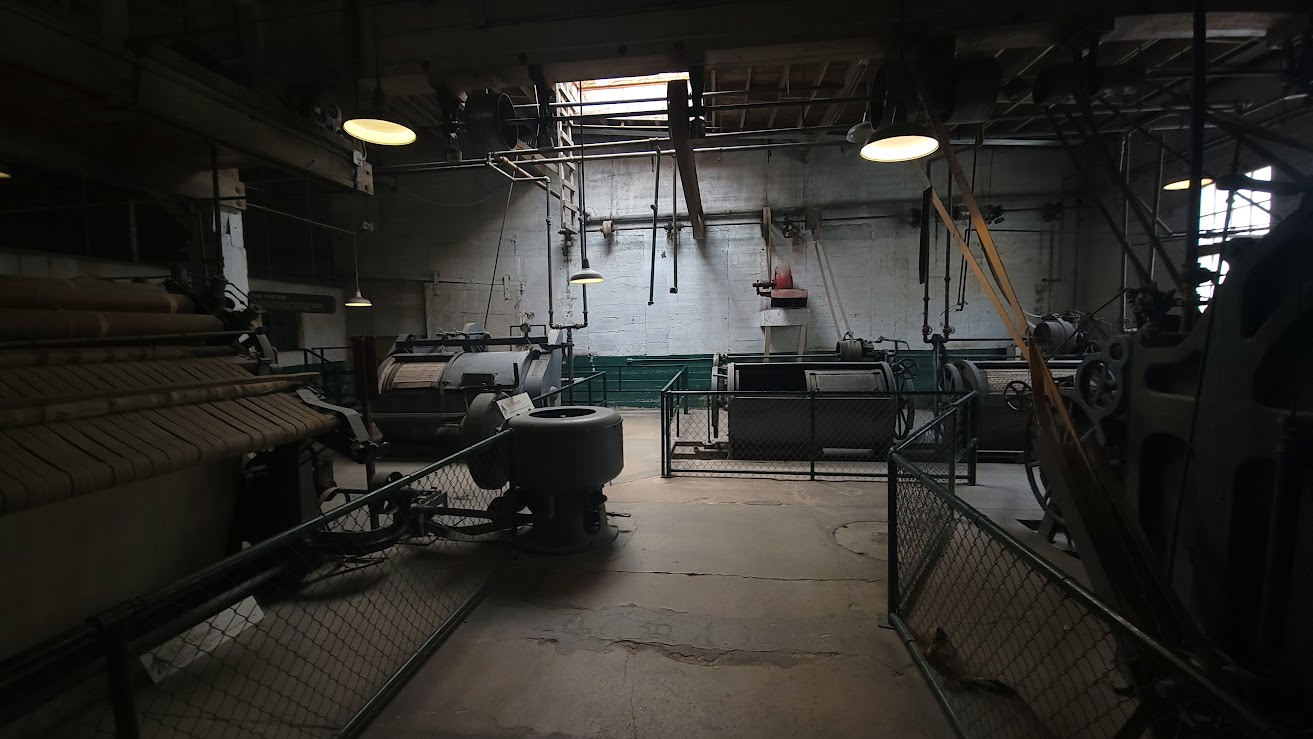
The Penitentiary's Laundry Room

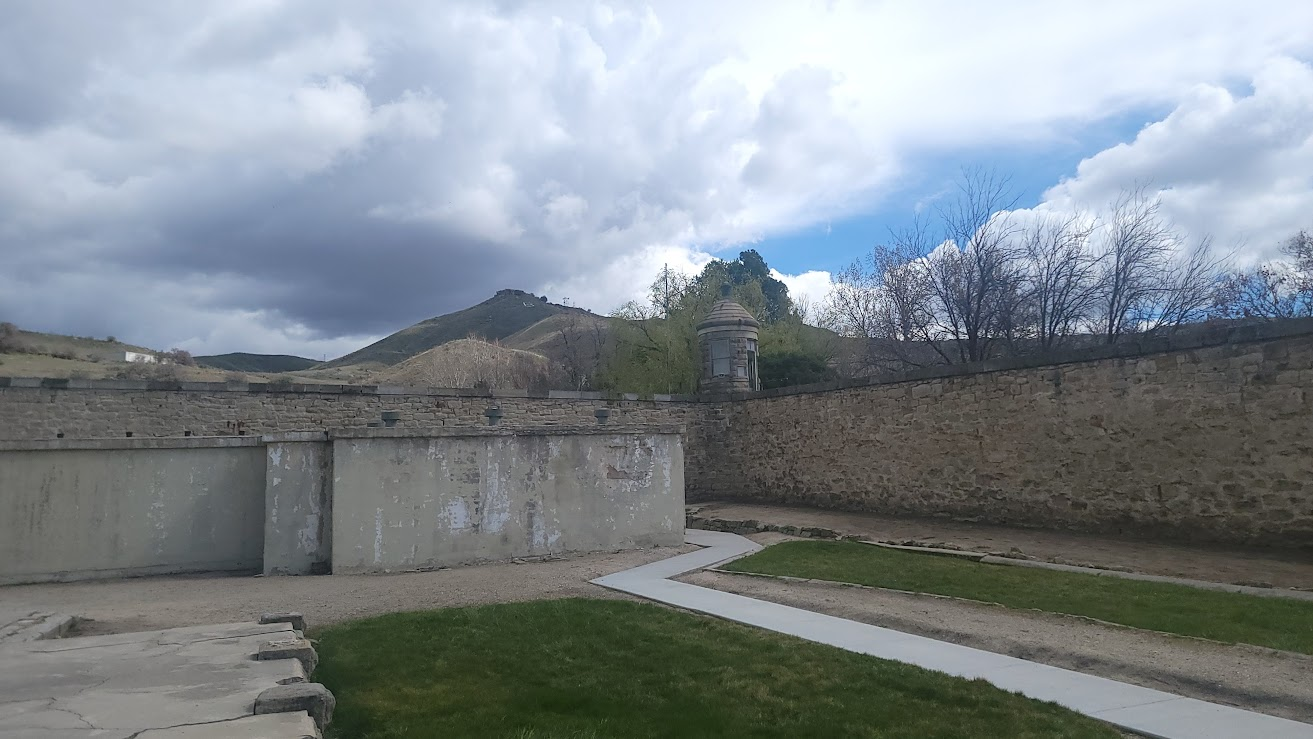
The southeast corner of the penitentiary walls, where the "cooler" is seen in the foreground and Table Rock in the background.

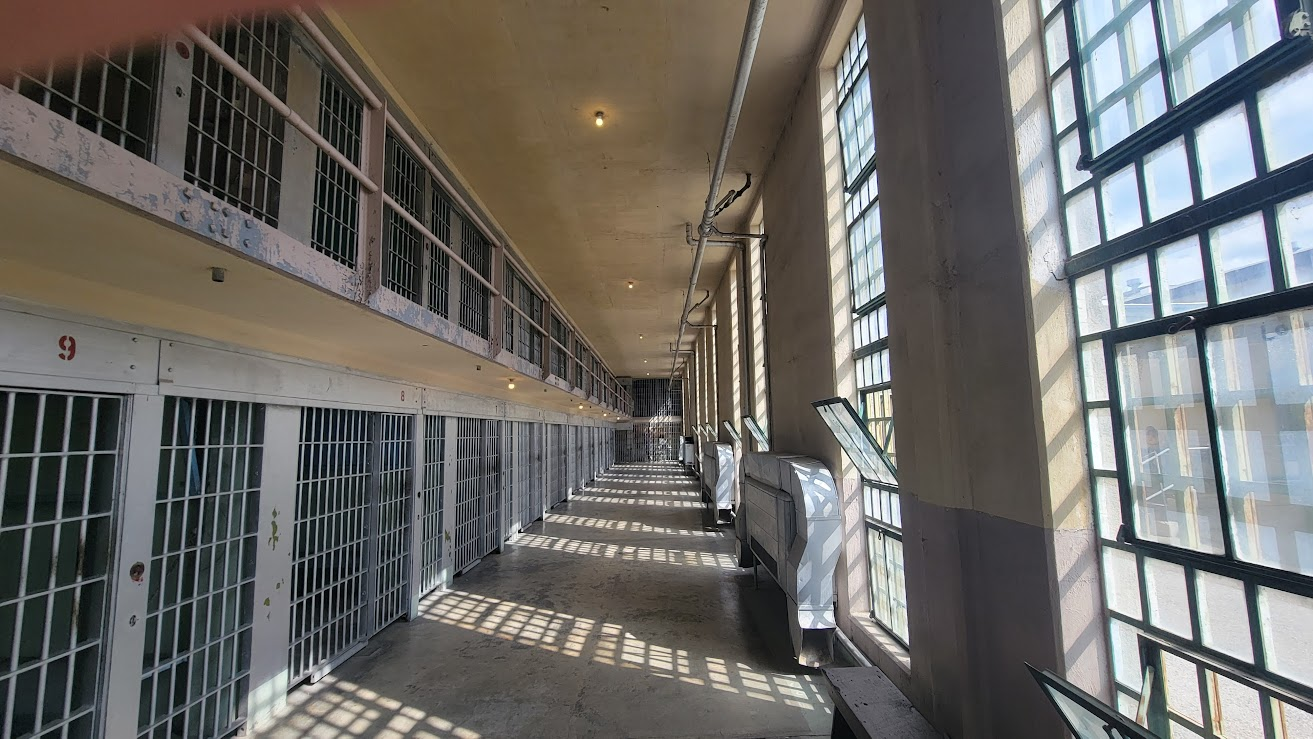
A section of cells at house four

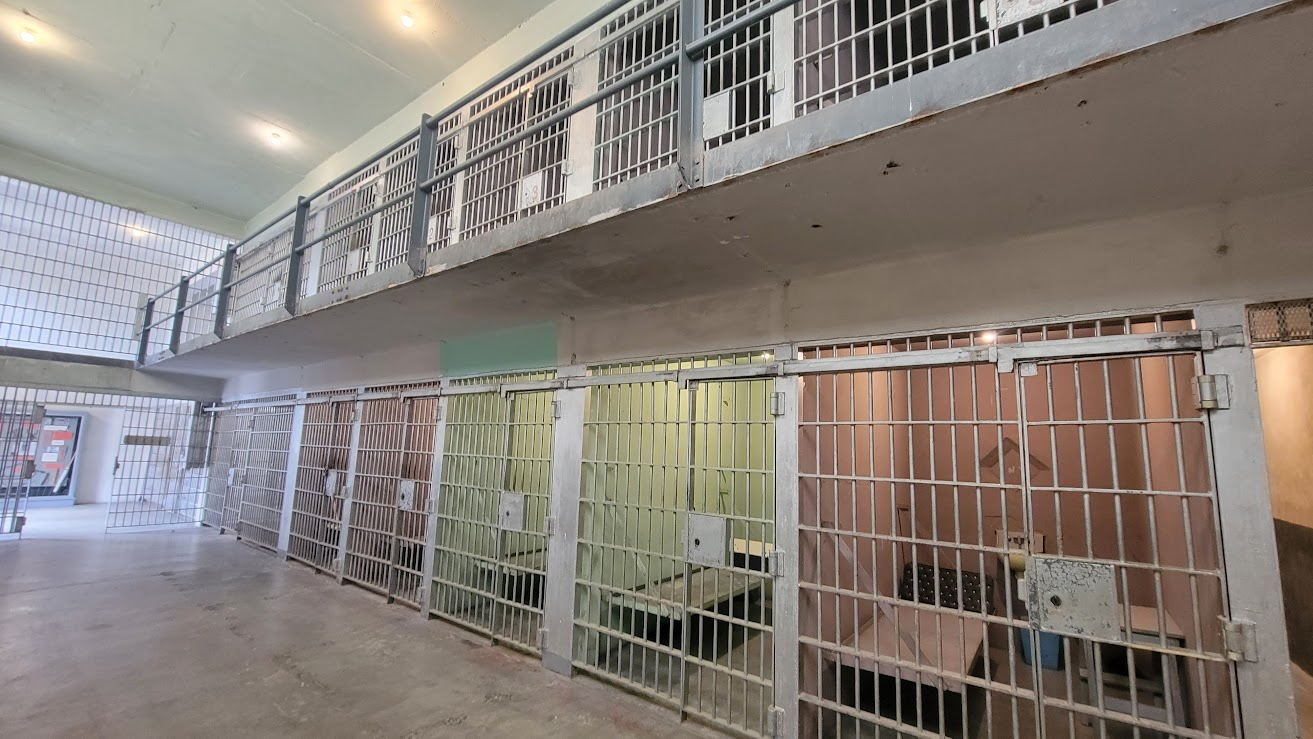
A section of cells at five house (maximum security)

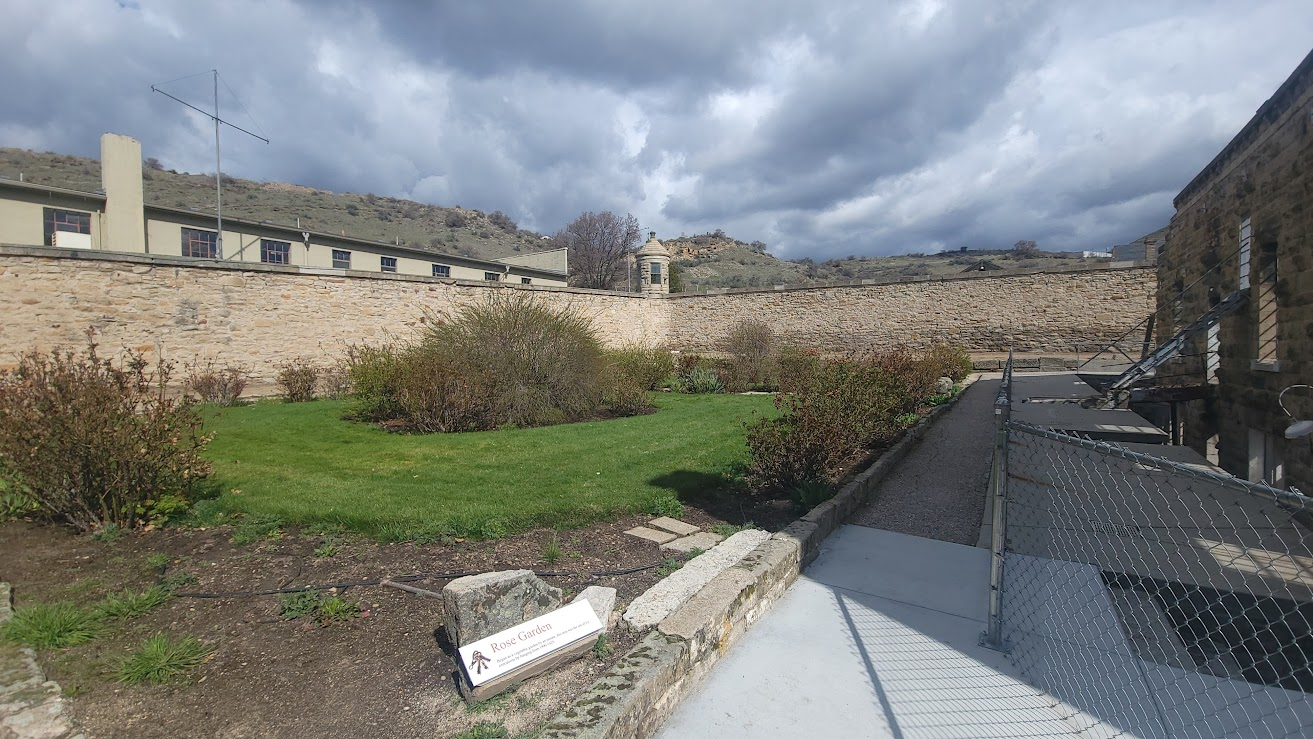
The Rose Garden where six executions took place.

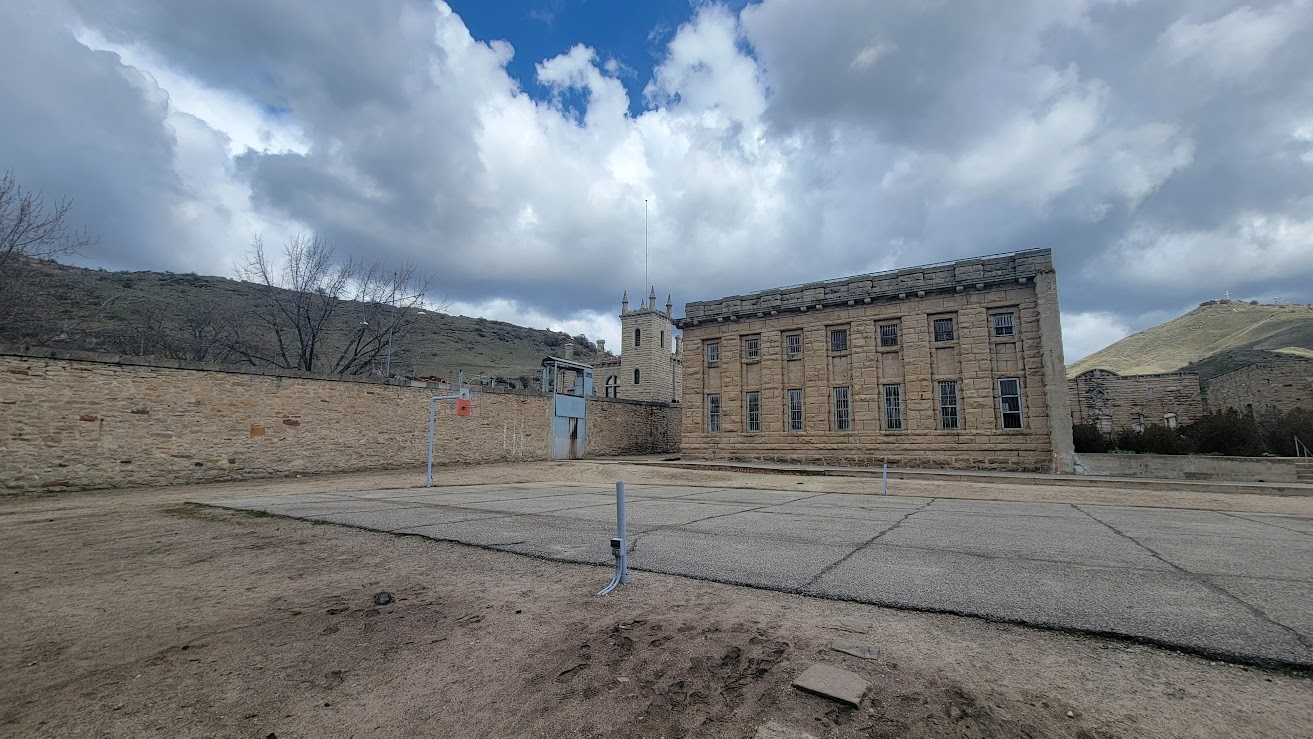
A view of the pen's recreational area and cell house two.

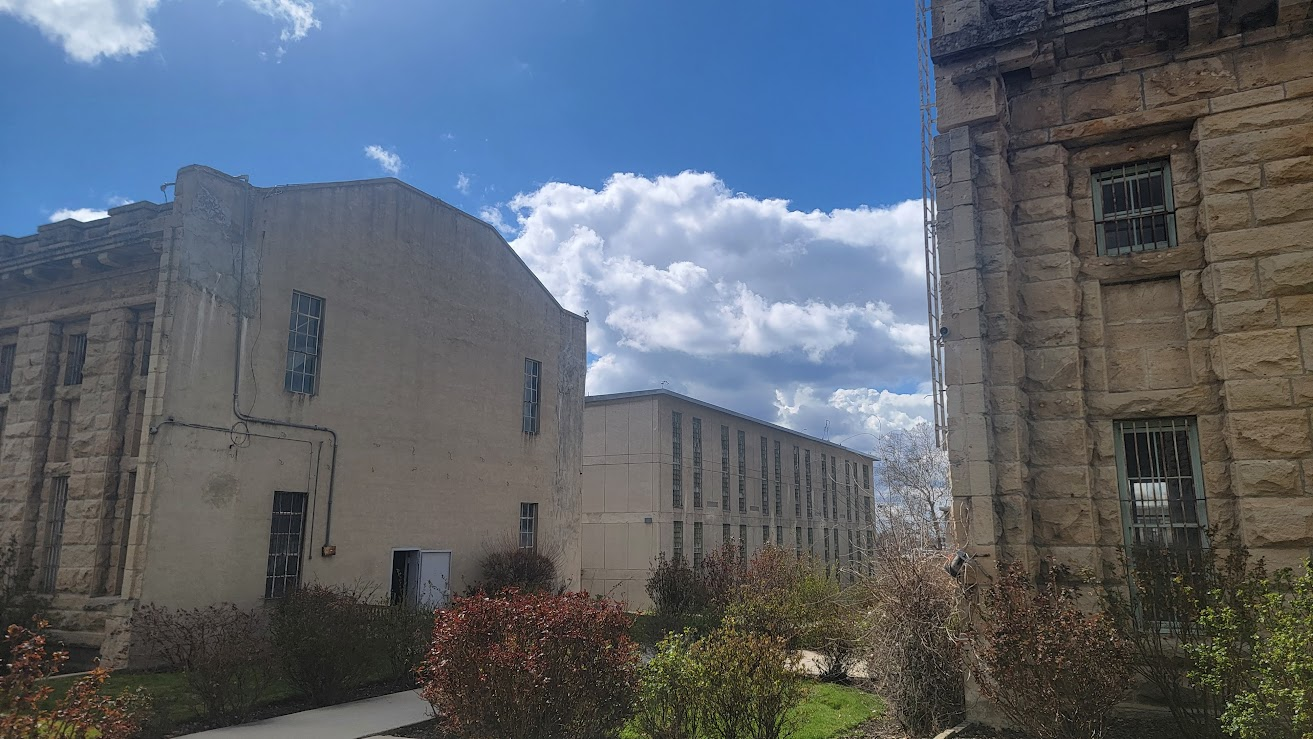
Cell houses three (left) and two (right) with cell house four in the background.

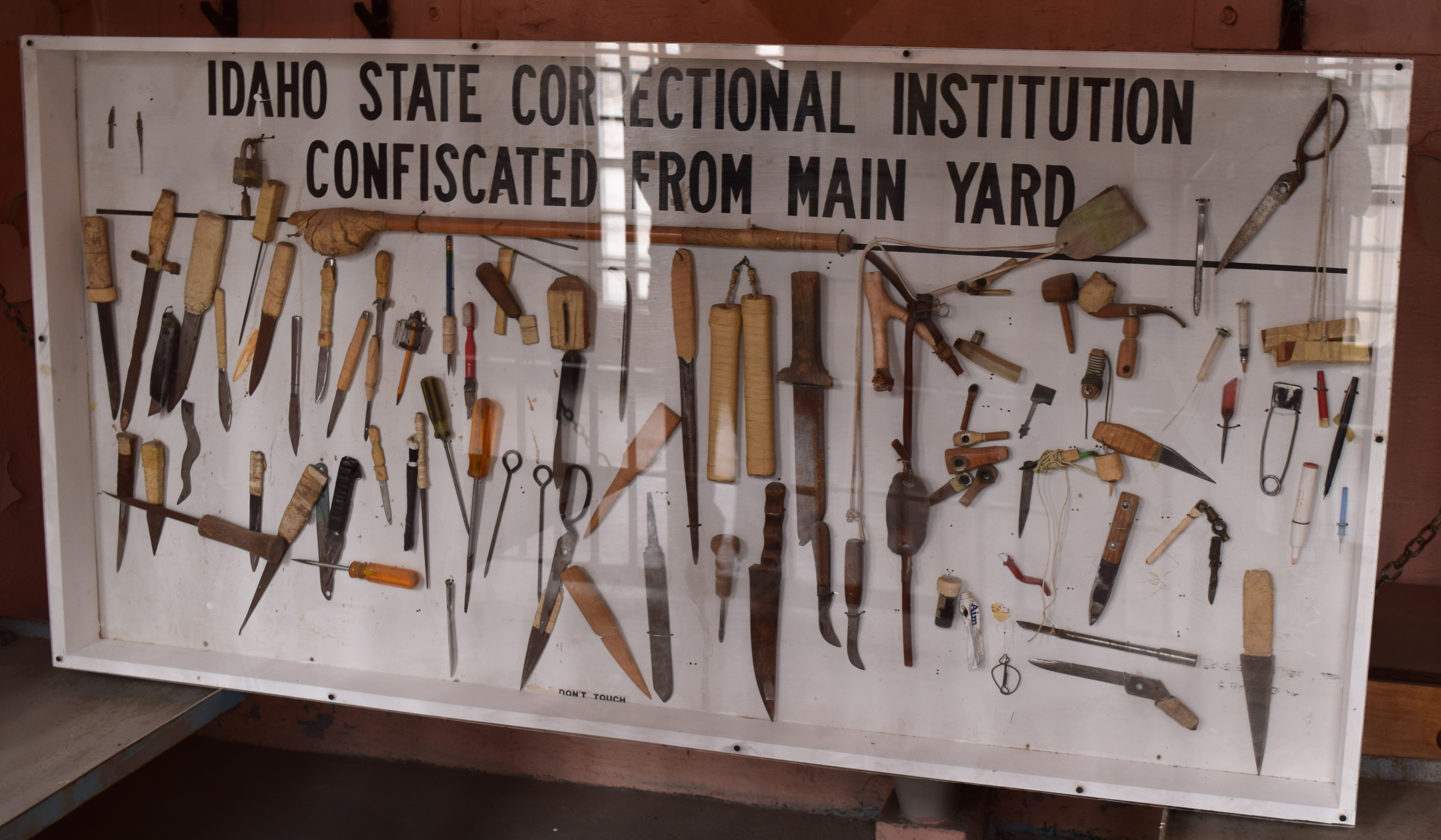
A display of contraband weapons confiscated from prisoners.
