= Willie Anderson =

Willie Anderson may refer to:

- Willie Anderson (offensive tackle) (born 1975), American football offensive tackle
- Flipper Anderson (Willie Lee Anderson Jr., born 1965), American football wide receiver
- Willie Anderson (basketball) (born 1967), American basketball player
- Willie Anderson (footballer) (born 1947), English soccer player
- Willie Anderson (golfer) (1879–1910), Scottish golfer
- Willie Anderson (rugby union, born 1955), Irish rugby union coach and player
- Willie Anderson (rugby union, born 1967), Scottish rugby union player

== See also ==
- William Anderson (disambiguation)
