= Table Rock (Ada County, Idaho) =

Mountain pillar near Boise, Idaho, US

Coordinates: 43.595°N 116.143°W

Location in the United States

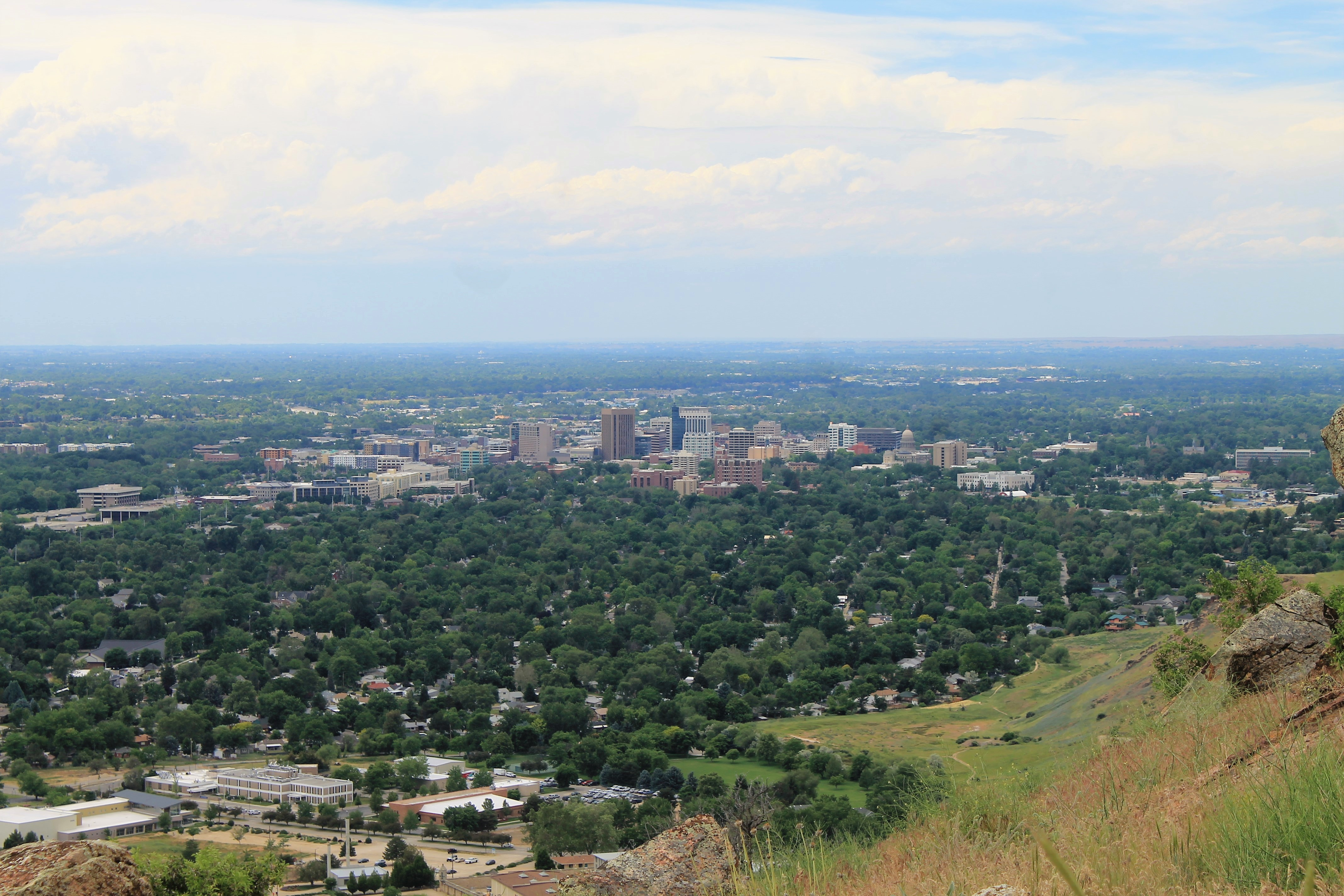
Boise as seen from Table Rock, 2017.

Location in Idaho

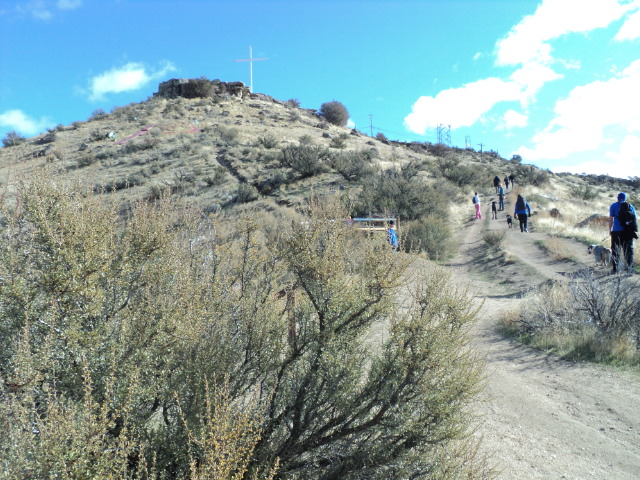
Day hikers approaching the cross

Table Rock is a mountain pillar in the western United States, located just south-east of downtown Boise, Idaho, in the foothills of the Boise Range of the Rocky Mountains. Its summit elevation of 3,650 feet (1,115 m) above sea level is 900 feet (275 m) above the city center.

Located between downtown Boise and the foothills, Table Rock has multiple caves and ledges and overlooks the Treasure Valley.

A prominent local landmark, it is a popular spot for day hiking from the Old State Penitentiary which offers access to views of the Treasure Valley, Owyhee Mountains, and the Boise Foothills themselves. Trailhead access and parking is behind the Bishop's House in the Penitentiary Historic District. The Idaho State Historical Society manages Table Rock Mesa. Table Rock is open to foot and bike traffic from sunrise to sunset. A gate is installed on Table Rock Road to prevent vehicle access.

An illuminated sixty-foot (18 m) white cross at its summit has been the subject of a lawsuit involving the separation of church and state (the cross itself stands on four square feet (0.4 m^{2}) of land sold to the Jaycees for $100 in 1972, hence it stands on private property). The legality of the land sale to the Jaycees is disputed, as the land board meeting minutes, which discuss the sale, indicate that the sale was structured specifically to sell the land to the Jaycees for the purpose of insulating the cross from legal attack. The sale included language that allowed the Land Board to reject any offers, with the stated intent of rejecting offers other than from the Jaycees.

The Table Rock Mesa was first quarried in the 1860s with much of the sandstone around Boise coming from Table Rock, including the Old Idaho Penitentiary. It continues to be an active quarry today.

In 2016, illegal fireworks usage on Table Rock shortly after midnight on June 30 initiated a 2,500-acre (10 km^{2}) wildfire.

== Prehistory ==
Table Rock was sacred to the Northern Shoshone, who used the high plateau, numerous caves, and nearby hot springs as a ceremonial meeting place. Artifacts have been found in the course of the construction of nearby subdivisions, including obsidian bi-face knives of varying sizes.

In 1893, prisoners quarrying stone for the penitentiary discovered Native American remains. In addition to skeletal remains, they also unearthed beads and bracelets, adding evidence that Table Rock is a sacred Native American burial ground.

== The Cross ==
=== Building the Cross ===
The idea for putting the cross on Table Rock came from the TV program This Is Your Life and the Jaycees asked volunteers to build the cross. The Jaycees club's original goal in building the cross was to promote Christianity as well as taking a stand against communism in the mid-1950s, and $880 was raised to fund the project. Dick Wilcolm, Rich Jordan, and Chet Sawyer were the three volunteers that dug the hole and placed the cross in the ground. The original cross required $60 a month to power the lights that illuminated the cross, however in 2011 the lights were changed to LED lights, cutting the price down to $20.

=== Controversy ===
The cross that stands on top of Table Rock has had a volatile history over the last 69 years.

The controversy began in 1956, when the Junior Chamber of Commerce (Jaycees) built the cross on what was then Department of Correction land. At the time, the Department of Correction owned a 109-acre (44 ha) tract that included the bluff of Table Rock.

In 1970, the Jaycees submitted a request to the Board of Correction on June 10 for the purchase a 44-by-70-foot (13 by 21 m) parcel of land that would surround the land around the cross.

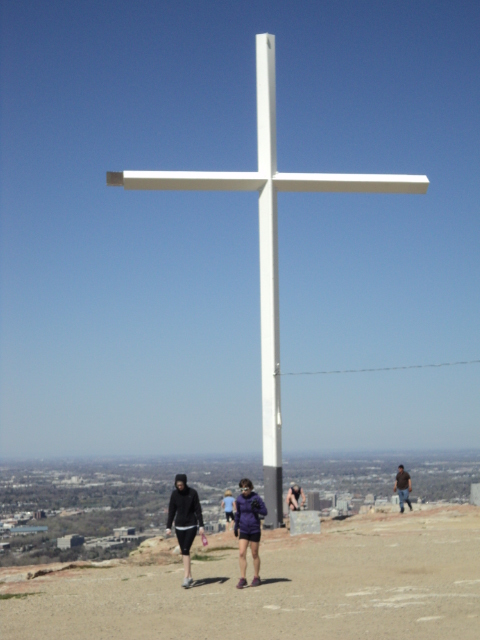
A rear view of the cross, which is illuminated nightly by inset LEDs

On June 25, 1971, the Correction Board deemed the desired land surplus and turned it over to the Idaho Department of Lands. Idaho Board of Land Commissioners records reveal that because the requested land was on the very edge of Table Rock's ledge, the Board of Correction did not feel it would negatively impact the surrounding state owned land.

Sale of the land was the responsibility of the Land Board. In November 1971, an auction was held for the sale of the land with the appraised price of one hundred dollars. The sale of the land was advertised in the Idaho Statesman, Boise's daily newspaper, weekly for six weeks. The Jaycees and a man named Paul Kimball signed up as bidders, though Kimball did not place a bid.

The land was sold to the Jaycees for $100, and the cross has been considered to be on private property.

On December 16, 1994, the American Civil Liberties Union (ACLU) penned a letter to the Land Board asserting the sale of the parcel of land was both unconstitutional and a violation of state law. The letter stated the Land Board had taken the liberty of refusing bids other than the Jaycee's. It also accused the Land Board of restricting media coverage, which they claimed had left the general public in the dark. In March 1995, Land Board members voted and rejected the ACLU's request to void the sale.

Controversy escalated in November 1999, when (self-described) atheist human rights activist Rob Sherman gave a speech at BSU claiming the Jaycees were a “bunch of criminals” and threatened action to bring the cross down. The dispute resulted in over 10,000 participating in a march from the Boise Depot to the Statehouse to save the Table Rock cross.

The final cross is 4,500 pounds, six stories tall, and contains 2,600 LED lights. The cross sits 3,629 feet above sea level.

== Gallery ==
Table Rock
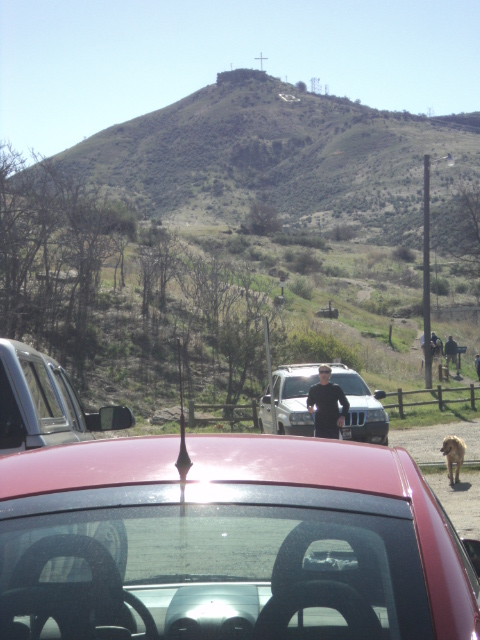
Table Rock from the parking lot of the defunct Idaho State Penitentiary, itself a tourist destination.

The Table Rock Fire at 5:24 a.m. on July 1, 2016 from S. Federal Way just east of the Bunting Memorial Scenic Overlook; Table Rock is burning on the left.

The aftermath of the Table Rock Fire. This video was taken from the Bunting Memorial Scenic Overlook on S. Federal Way the day after the fire.

== See also ==
- List of Landforms in Idaho
