= Lyda Southard =

American serial murderer (1892–1958)

Lyda Trueblood
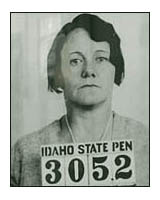
- Born: October 16, 1892; Keytesville, Missouri, U.S.
- Died: February 5, 1958 (aged 65); Salt Lake City, Utah, U.S.
- Other names: Lyda Anna Mae Trueblood; "Flypaper Lyda"; "The Black Widow"
- Status: Deceased
- Motive: Life insurance
- Conviction: Second degree murder
- Penalty: 10 years to life in prison

Details
- Victims: 1–6
- Span of crimes: 1915–1920
- Country: United States
- States: Idaho, Montana
- Weapon: Arsenic poisoning
- Date apprehended: May 1921

Lyda Southard (October 16, 1892 – February 5, 1958), also known as Lyda Anna Mae Trueblood, was an American female suspected serial killer. It was suspected that she had killed four of her husbands, a brother-in-law, and her daughter by arsenic poisoning, using arsenic derived from flypaper, in order to obtain life insurance money.

== Early life ==
Lyda Trueblood was born on October 16, 1892, in Keytesville, Missouri, 60 miles northeast of Kansas City and in the central flatlands of Missouri.

== Marriages ==
Trueblood married Robert Dooley on March 17, 1912. The couple settled with his brother Ed Dooley on a ranch in Twin Falls, Idaho, and had a daughter, Lorraine, in 1913. Lorraine died unexpectedly in 1915, Trueblood claimed, as a result of drinking water from a dirty well. Edward Dooley died soon afterward in August 1915; the cause of death was ruled ptomaine poisoning. Robert Dooley subsequently fell ill and died of typhoid fever on October 12, 1915, leaving Trueblood as the sole survivor in the family. Trueblood collected on the life insurance policies of each person shortly after their death.

Two years after Robert Dooley's death, Trueblood married William G. McHaffle. Shortly afterward, Trueblood's three-year-old daughter fell ill and died, prompting the McHaffles to move to Montana. A year later, McHaffle suddenly fell ill of what was thought to be influenza and died in Montana on October 1, 1918. The death certificate stated the cause of death as influenza and diphtheria.

In March 1919, she married Harlen C. Lewis, an automobile salesman from Billings, Montana. Within four months of their marriage, Lewis fell ill and died from complications of gastroenteritis.

Trueblood married for a fourth time in Pocatello, Idaho, to Edward F. Meyer, a ranch foreman, in August 1920. He mysteriously fell ill of typhoid and died on September 7, 1920.

List of marriages

1. Robert Dooley (March 17, 1912 – October 12, 1915)
2. William G. McHaffle (June 1917-October 1, 1918)
3. Harlen C. Lewis (March 1919-July 1919)
4. Edward F. Meyer (August 1920-September 7, 1920)
5. Paul V. Southard (?, divorced)
6. Harry Whitlock (March 1932-?, divorced)
7. Hal Shaw (possibly divorced)

== Murders ==
Twin Falls chemist Earl Dooley, a relative of Trueblood's first husband, began to study the deaths surrounding her. Along with a physician and another chemist, he soon discovered that Ed and Robert Dooley were murdered by arsenic poisoning. Twin Falls County Prosecutor Frank Stephan began an investigation and had the bodies of three of Lyda Trueblood's husbands, her four-year-old daughter, and her brother-in-law exhumed.

Stephan discovered that some of the bodies contained traces of arsenic, while others were suspected of arsenic poisoning by how well the bodies were preserved, and found her motive in the records of the Idaho State Life Insurance company of Boise. All four of Trueblood's husbands had held a life insurance policy where they listed her as the beneficiary. Trueblood was able to collect over $7,000 over the years from the deaths of her first three husbands.

She was found by law enforcement in Honolulu, married for the fifth time to Navy petty officer Paul Southard. Following extradition to Idaho, she was arraigned on June 11, 1921.

== Prison ==
Lyda [now] Southard was returned to Idaho to face murder charges on Meyer. She pleaded not guilty in court, but was convicted of using arsenic to murder her husbands and taking the money from their life insurance policies. It was determined that her motive for murder was money, since she had taken out, and collected on, life insurance policies for each of her dead husbands.

Following a six-week trial, Southard was convicted of second degree murder and sentenced to ten years to life in the Old Idaho State Penitentiary. She escaped from prison on May 4, 1931 and took up residence in Denver, Colorado, as a housekeeper for Harry Whitlock, whom she married in March 1932, but who ultimately assisted in her arrest in Topeka, Kansas, on July 31, 1932. Southard returned to the penitentiary in August 1932. She was released on probation in October 1941, and received a final pardon.

== Death ==
Lyda Southard died of a heart attack on February 5, 1958, in Salt Lake City, Utah. Her body was interred at Sunset Memorial Park in Twin Falls, Idaho.

== See also ==
- List of serial killers in the United States

== Further reading and other media ==
- Anderson, William C. (1994). Lady Bluebeard: The True Story of Love and Marriage, Death and Flypaper. Fred Pruett Books.
- Episode of the podcast Murderous Roots discussing the murders and Southard's family tree.
- Olsen, Gregg and Morgan Olsen (2026). Ordinary Wife: The True Story America's Forgotten Serial Killer.
