= Bill Anderson (footballer, born 1911) =

Australian rules footballer

Personal information
- Full name: William McKenzie Anderson
- Born: 12 February 1911; Geelong, Victoria
- Died: 15 May 1971 (aged 60); Ivanhoe, Victoria
- Original team: Barwon

Playing career^{1}
Years	Club	Games (Goals)
1932	Geelong	6 (0)
- ^{1} Playing statistics correct to the end of 1932.

William McKenzie Anderson (12 February 1911 – 15 May 1971) was an Australian rules footballer who played with the Geelong Football Club in the Victorian Football League (VFL).

== Family ==
The son of Donald James Anderson (1884–1944), and Ida Anderson (1881–1916), née Charity, William McKenzie Anderson was born at Geelong, Victoria, on 12 February 1911.

He married Dorothy Louisa Jeffreys in 1937. They had two children.

== Death ==
He died at his residence in Ivanhoe, Victoria on 15 May 1971.
