= William Anderson (minister) =

Theological writer and preacher from Scotland

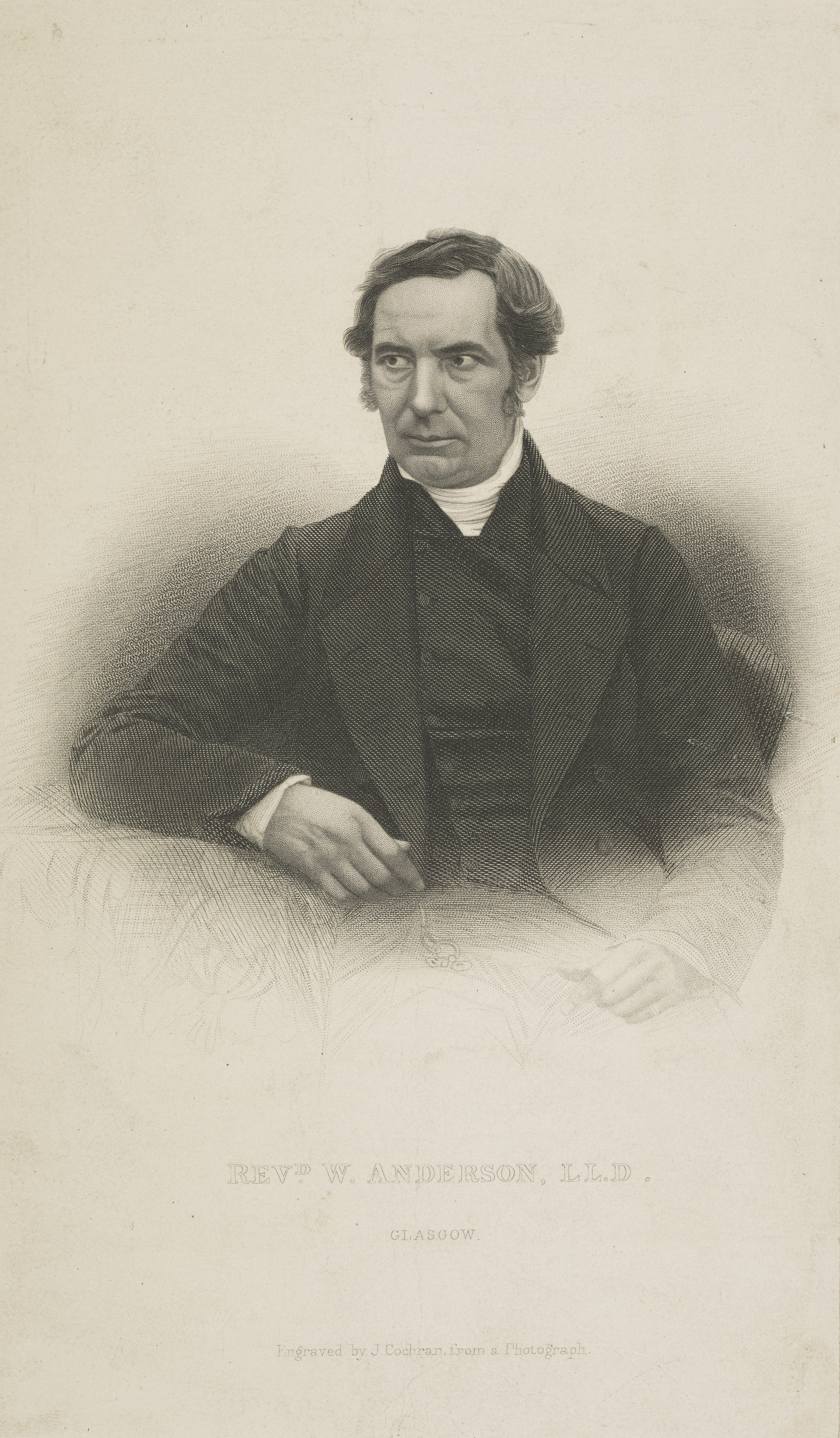
- William Anderson by John Cochran
- Church: Relief Church; United Presbyterian Church

Personal details
- Born: 1799
- Died: 1872 (aged 72–73)

Anderson in the mid 1860s.

William Anderson (1799–1872) was a Scottish theological writer and preacher. He was born at Kilsyth and studied at Glasgow University. He was the Presbyterian minister of John Street Relief Church, Glasgow in 1822. As an author he published The Mass, Penance, Regeneration and other theological works. He died near Glasgow, aged 72.

== Life ==
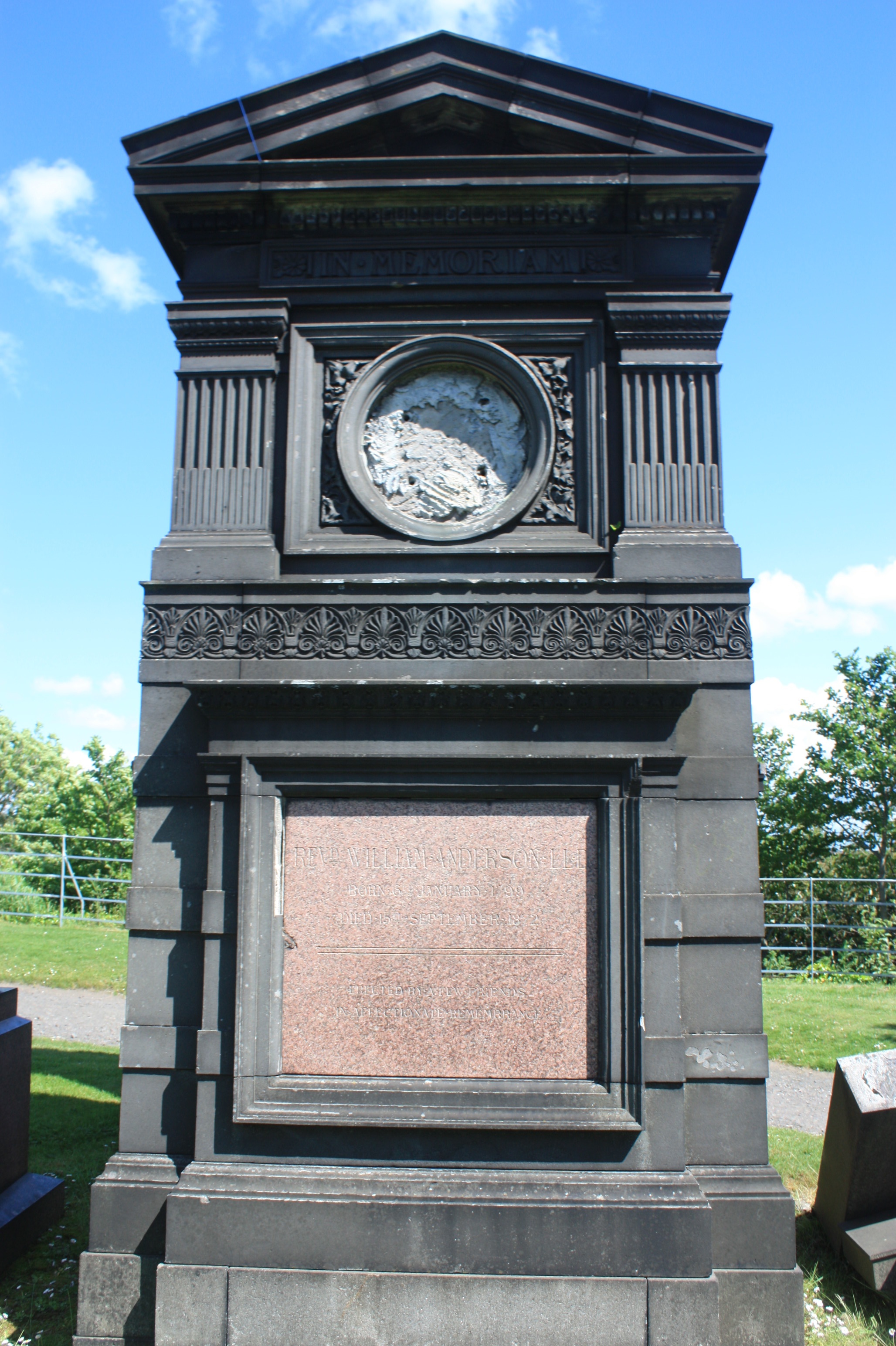
The grave of Rev William Anderson, Glasgow Necropolis

Anderson was born on 6 January 1799, at Kilsyth, near Glasgow, where his father, Rev. John Anderson, was minister of a congregation of what was then called the Relief church, afterwards merged in the United Presbyterian. William Anderson became a minister in the same communion, having been ordained in 1822 pastor of the congregation in John Street, Glasgow, an office which he held till his death, though for some years he had retired from its more active duties. Very early in his career Anderson manifested an eccentricity which procured for him the sobriquet of ‘daft Willie Anderson.’ He showed much resolution in his early youth in insisting on his right to read his discourses in the pulpit from manuscript, and in his vindication of the use of the organ in public worship.

As a preacher he was popular, but his powers were more forcibly displayed on public platforms. He was an uncompromising opponent of slavery, an enthusiastic supporter of oppressed nationalities, an eager advocate of political reforms in the interest of the people, and a cordial supporter of liberal measures generally. He was likewise a strenuous advocate for the separation of church and state. On one occasion in London, in pleading the anti-slavery cause, he appeared on the same platform with Daniel O'Connell, and made so favourable an impression that O'Connell and the audience urged him to continue his speech when the time allotted to him came to an end.

Anderson was a favourite with the community of Glasgow, and, in a sense, held a similar position to that of Dr. Chalmers before him, and that of Norman Macleod after him. He encouraged independence of thought and action, and was a strenuous opponent of the Church of Rome. He was a strong millenarian, and in early life had come under the influence of Edward Irving and Mr. Cunninghame of Lainshaw.

Anderson published many pamphlets and several books. His larger productions were two volumes of sermons, a volume on Regeneration, one on the ‘Filial Honour of God,’ and two volumes on the Mass and Penance. His theological position was that of a moderate Calvinist. In social life his wide general knowledge, his humour, his store of anecdotes and memorable sayings, rendered him singularly attractive. He received an honorary doctorate (LLD) from the University of Glasgow in 1850. He became a Fellow of the Royal Society of Edinburgh in 1870.

He died on 15 September 1872 and was buried in the Glasgow Necropolis. The distinctive grave (though lacking its bronze portrait medallion) stands towards the south-west of the upper section.
