= William Henry Anderson =

American entomologist

- Born: November 21, 1908; Chesterfield, Massachusetts, United States
- Died: November 13, 1997 (aged 88); Snow Hill, Maryland, United States
- Education: University of Maryland
- Scientific career
- Fields: Entomology
- Workplaces: United States Department of Agriculture, Bureau of Entomology, Plant Quarantine, Insect Identification, Parasite Introduction Research Branch

William Henry Anderson (November 21, 1908 – November 13, 1997) was an American entomologist.

== Biography ==
Anderson was born in 1908. He was educated at the University of Maryland, in which he also got his Ph.D. in 1936. During the same year he became a member of the United States Department of Agriculture, his job was there as a field assistant, and at the same time he worked with the Bureau of Entomology and Plant Quarantine. In 1937 he received a promotion as an assistant entomologist, and in 1939 he became the entomologist himself. He was appointed as Chief of Insect Identification and Parasite Introduction Research Branch in 1960, which position he kept till he retired in 1967. He was a specialist on the Coleoptera and its larvae.
