= William Anderson (cricketer, born 1909) =

English cricketer

Personal information
- Full name: William Alexander Anderson
- Born: 28 July 1909; Sandwich, England
- Died: 21 April 1975 (aged 65); Much Hadham, England
- Batting: Left-handed

Domestic team information
- Years: Team
- 1946: Free Foresters

Career statistics
Competition	First-class
Matches	1
Runs scored	14
Batting average	14
100s/50s	0/0
Top score	14
Catches/stumpings	0/–
- Source: CricketArchive, 12 August 2008

William Alexander Anderson (28 July 1909 – 21 April 1975) was an English cricketer who played a single first-class cricket game for Free Foresters against Cambridge University Cricket Club in 1946.
