= William Anderson (bookseller) =

Bookseller and Provost from Stirling, Scotland (1746–1730)

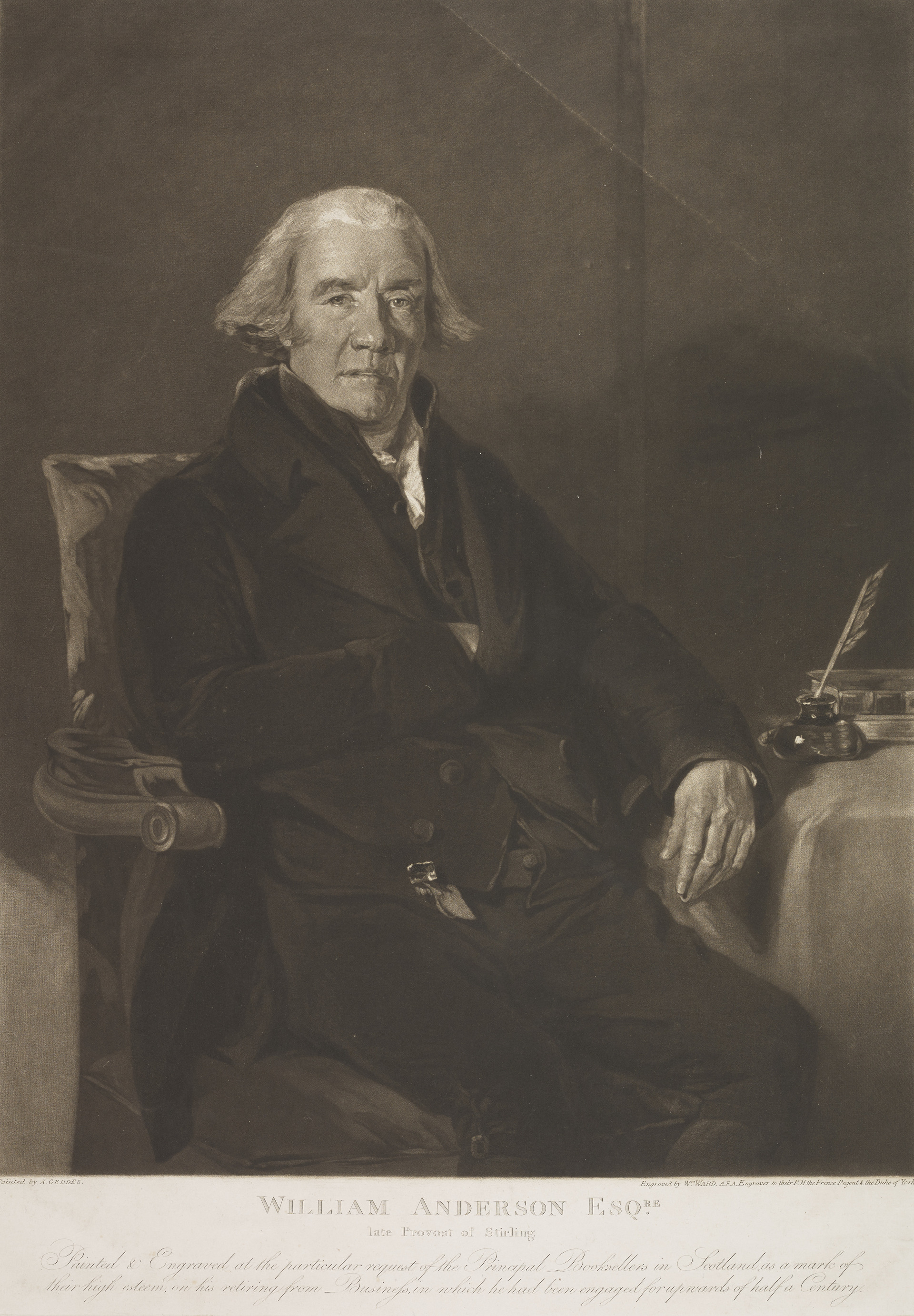
- Born: 1746. Stirling, Scotland
- Died: 1830 (aged 83–84)
- Occupation: Bookseller
- Known for: Provost of Stirling (1793, 1794, 1813, 1814, 1829)

William Anderson (1746-1830) was a bookseller in Stirling, Scotland. He was one of three triplets: himself and two sisters. One of his sisters perished, by accident, when eleven years of age, and the other was still alive when he died. He was elected Provost of Stirling five times in the years 1793, 1794, 1813, 1814, and 1829. He is reported to have had a very lavish funeral which was his long-standing ambition. An engraving was made by William Ward of his portrait which was painted by Andrew Geddes. After his retiral a gilded copy of the engraving is said to have hung in his former bookstore. The British Museum hold a copy of the print. Anderson served for many years as a Justice of the Peace.

== Namesake ==
There is another Provost Anderson (Robert) who traded with James Johnston of Stirling, a timber merchant under the name of Johnston and Anderson.

== Sources ==
- Cook, W. B. (1893). "Reprinted from "The Stirling Sentinel," 1888-1893". The Stirling Antiquary. 1. Stirling: Cook & Wylie: 124.
- Cook, W. B.; Morris, David R, eds. (1916). The Stirling guildry book. Extracts from the records of the merchant guild of Stirling ... 1592–1846. Stirling: Glasgow, Stirlingshire and Sons of the Rock Society. p. 180.
- Cook, W. B. (1879). The "Stirling Sentinel" portrait gallery. Stirling, Scotland: Cook & Wylie. p. 39.
- Drysdale, William (1898). Old faces, old places, and old stories of Stirling. E. Mackay. pp. 58–60.
- Ronald, James (1899). Landmarks of Old Stirling. Stirling: Eneas Mackay. p. 378.
- Shearer, John Elliot (1897). Shearer's Stirling : historical and descriptive, with extracts from Burgh records and Exchequer Roll volumes, 1264 to 1529, view of Stirling in 1620, and an old plan of Stirling. Stirling: R.S. Shearer & Son. p. 50.
- "depicted: William Anderson". National Galleries of Scotland.
- Ward, William (1826). "William Anderson Esqre Late Provost of Stirling". the British Museum.
