= William Charles Anderson =

American novelist

William C. Anderson
- Col. William C. Anderson
- Born: William Charles Anderson; May 7, 1920; La Junta, Colorado, U.S.
- Died: May 16, 2003 (aged 83) Fairfield, California, U.S.
- Allegiance: United States
- Branch: United States Air Force
- Service years: 1943–1963
- Conflicts: World War II; Berlin Airlift - Berlin Blockade; Korean War; Vietnam War
- Other work: Author

William Charles Anderson (better known as William C. Anderson; May 7, 1920, La Junta, Colorado – May 16, 2003, in Fairfield, California) was the author of more than twenty novels, historical and true life stories, and author or coauthor of several screenplays for film and television, including the adaptation of his own Bat*21, which was adapted into a film, starring Gene Hackman and Danny Glover, and Hurricane Hunters, was made into the television film Hurricane, an ABC Movie of the Week starring Martin Milner.

== Life and career ==
The son of Robert Smith Anderson and Fanny (née Holly), Anderson was educated at Boise Junior College, Fort Hays College and the University of Maryland.

He served in the U.S. Air Force during World War II up through the Vietnam War, retiring as a colonel. He began writing in the 1950s, with a series of columns for MATS Flyer, the magazine of the Air Force's Military Air Transport Service (later MAC Flyer, after MATS became the Military Airlift Command).

He wrote short stories and later novels in various genres, including science fiction.

Several of his books were autobiographical accounts of the adventures of Anderson, his wife, Dortha (née Power, m. 1948), and their children, Ann (Ann Kiessling), Scott (Scott Charles Anderson) and Holly.

His fiction books all featured a supporting character named Colonel Cornelius C. (for "Catastrophe") Callaghan. Callaghan, a career Air Force officer, is a wheeler-dealer who uses his detailed knowledge and skill to help the lead characters, often despite regulations or higher authority.

In addition to his books, Anderson wrote a monthly column for Motor Home, under the titles Back Roads and Off Ramp. The last column was published two months before his death.

== Books ==
- Five, Four, Three, Two, One—Pfft (1960)
- Penelope (1963)
- Adam M-1 (1964)
- Pandemonium on the Potomac (1966)
- The Gooney Bird (1968)
- The Two-ton Albatross, or Across a Transcontinental Highway in a Travel Trailer... (1969)
- The Apoplectic Palm Tree (1969)
- Roll up the Wallpaper, We're Moving (1970)
- Hurricane Hunters (1972)
- The Headstrong Houseboat (1972)
- The Great Bicycle Expedition: Freewheeling through Europe... (1973)
- Different Spokes for Different Folks (1973)
- Penelope, the Damp Detective (1974)
- When the Offspring Have Sprung (1978)
- Home Sweet Home Has Wheels, or, Please Don't Tailgate the Real Estate (1979)
- BAT-21 (1980)
- Bomber Crew 369 (1986)
- Taming Mighty Alaska: an RV Odyssey (1990)
- Lady Bluebeard (1994) - the true story of serial killer Lyda Southard
- How to Survive Hospital Care, or "Why They Keep Bedpans in the Freezer" (1996)
