= Billy Anderson (Australian footballer) =

Australian rules footballer

Personal information
- Full name: William John Anderson
- Born: 15 August 1892; Newport, Victoria
- Died: 5 January 1954 (aged 61); Yarraville, Victoria
- Original team: South Yarra

Playing career^{1}
Years	Club	Games (Goals)
1912–13	St Kilda	10 (3)
- ^{1} Playing statistics correct to the end of 1913.

William John Anderson (15 August 1892 – 5 January 1954) was an Australian rules footballer who played with St Kilda in the Victorian Football League (VFL).
