= William J. Anderson =

American enslaved man and author (1811–?)

William J. Anderson (June 2, 1811 – ?) was an American who wrote a narrative describing his life as a slave.

== Early life ==
Anderson is believed to have been born on or around June 2, 1811, to Susan and Lewis Anderson. William's mother was a free woman, but his father was a slave, belonging to a Mr. Shelton. Later in William's life he wrote a narrative about himself that was published by the Chicago Daily Tribune and entitled:

Life and Narrative of William J. Anderson, Twenty-four Years a Slave; Sold Eight Times! In Jail Sixty Times!! Whipped Three Hundred Times!!! or The Dark Deeds of American Slavery Revealed. Containing Scriptural Views of the Origin of the Black and of the White Man. Also, a Simple and Easy Plan to Abolish Slavery in the United States. Together with an Account of the Services of Colored Men in the Revolutionary War–Day and Date, and Interesting Facts.

After the death of his father, his mother Susan sold William to Mr. Vance, who lived about ten miles away from her. William's life with Mr. Vance was not a good one. William was very interested in learning how to read and write and would often secretly steal or borrow books from white boys to practice these skills. Whenever his master discovered what William had been up to, he would whip and kick him. Nevertheless, William remained devoted to learning.

== Religious beliefs ==
William was a devout Christian. He believed that if he was a good Christian, he would go to heaven. He thought that this was important because he had never been treated well on earth, and it would be one place he could be happy and rest. Finally after much practice and determination, William learned how to read. The next thing that he wanted to do was learn how to write. Late at night, when his master was asleep, he would practice his writing by candlelight. He soon took to teaching a short lesson on Sundays to some of the other slaves on the plantation. But soon the white people found out and banned them from meeting again to talk about learning. Anderson was a slave.

== New master ==
William's next master kidnapped him in the night time and handcuffed him to bring him to his plantation. Anderson was not allowed to get any of his belongings or to say anything to friends or family. In Anderson's narrative he describes this master as "one of those cunning, fox-like slaveholders." Next he was brought to a slave market and sold to a southern trader. The trader then on November 6, 1826, tied together sixty to seventy slaves, Anderson included, and made them walk from Eastern to Western Tennessee. The journey took a total of two months. While William and the other slaves walked they sang "Farewell, ye children of the Lord". When they reached their final destination, women and men were separated to stand in lines to be sold.

== Charged with crime ==
On December 12, 1856, William was arrested and charged with helping slaves from Kentucky. On pages 53 and 54 of his narrative he explains how horribly he was treated by the guards. He also explains what it was like to be an African American during those times in jail charged with such a crime. When the day of the trial came, several people testified against him but nevertheless, the court found him a free man. In the Appendix of his narrative it has a plan that he has written for a plan to abolish slavery:

My plan is simply this: Let Congress set apart a territory somewhere in the United States for the colored people, open to the choice of free and slaves to immigrate to, as they may think proper. Then let Congress appropriate several millions of dollars in lands or otherwise, to be paid to the holders of slaves for them, say a stipulated sum on each. Upon the payment of this let the slaveholders give the slaves their liberty. As most of the slave labor will be needed, let their present masters, or others, hire them as they choose, for a small compensation. At the same time let them have the advantages of education. By this arrangement the masters would get three times the work done, and on the whole the master and slave would prove a blessing to each other.

1. Congress is able to donate to Railroad Companies large tracts of land to aid them in the construction of their lines.

2. The United States, with her glorious institutions, rich and plenteous soil, invites all nations to her friendly protection; while at the same time they discourage, or will not set apart a place for colored people, which surely ought to be done. Justice to the colored man demands it, for the profits of the past. We leave the philosopher and scholar to determine, and the Christian Church, both North and South; to pray and think over these matters of great importance. O, may God impress it upon their minds.

3. They all agree that slavery is an evil; they all, with a few exceptions, profess a desire to get rid of it; and by this simple plan the slave will be encouraged to work hard, to maintain and educate his family. A great deal of their labor will be needed where they are to till the lands, and if such an institution were established, things would prosper far better than they do at present. Every servant would work with a glad and cheerful heart. The overseers' wages would be saved, and there would be no requirement for warlike implements.

Let all those who feel so disposed, emigrate to the said territory from either north or south--and many would go with their families and wealth--and there would soon be a large colony established. All this could be as easily done as to grant lands to make railroads and other improvements. I do think this ought to be done, but we wait for our friends to speak, petition and write on this subject, for as a race our hands are tied and mouths stopped. Come, friends, by way of investigation, let us hear from you from all points, both north and south. We say again, that there are large tracts of unbounded territory, then why will not the whites give the blacks a place. We are brought here captives by them from our native country, and have helped to clear and till this, and now to be forced away is more than we can bear.
