= Billy Anderson (halfback) =

American football player (born 1929)

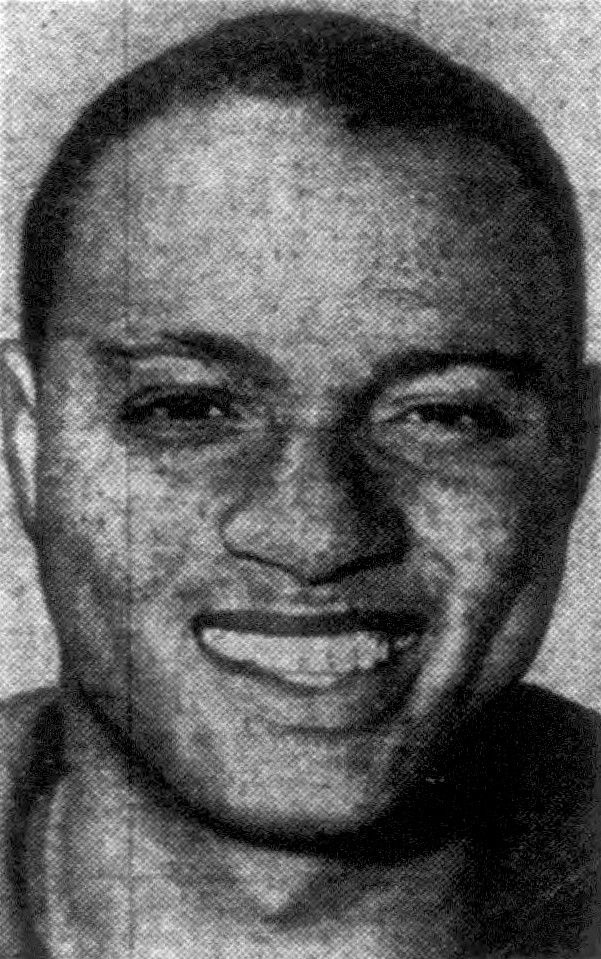
- Anderson, circa 1953

No. 46
- Positions: Halfback, Defensive back

Personal information
- Born: March 3, 1929 (age 97); Los Angeles, California, U.S.
- Listed height: 6 ft 0 in (1.83 m)
- Listed weight: 198 lb (90 kg)

Career information
- High school: Susan Miller Dorsey (Los Angeles)
- College: Compton CC (CA) (1948–1949)
- NFL draft: 1953: 1st round, 6th overall pick

Career history
- Chicago Bears (1953–1954)

Career NFL statistics
- Rushing yards: 8
- Rushing average: 2.7
- Receptions: 3
- Receiving yards: 33
- Stats at Pro Football Reference

William Anderson (born George Billy Nelson; March 3, 1929) is an American former professional football player who played two seasons with the Chicago Bears of the National Football League (NFL). He was selected by the Bears with the sixth pick of the first round of the 1953 NFL draft. He played college football at Compton Community College.

== Early life ==
Williams Anderson was born as George Billy Nelson on March 3, 1929, in Los Angeles, California to Mamie and George Nelson. At some point, Mamie and George separated, and Mamie would marry radio comedian Eddie "Rochester" Anderson in 1939. Both Mamie and Billy would adopt Anderson's surname. He attended Susan Miller Dorsey High School in Los Angeles. He played college football at Compton Junior College from 1948 to 1949. Anderson later served in the United States Army.

== Professional career ==
Anderson was selected by the Chicago Bears in the first round, with the sixth overall pick, of the 1953 NFL draft. He officially signed with the team on April 2, 1953. He played in all 12 games, starting nine, for the Bears during his rookie year in 1953, totaling three receptions for 33 yards, five kick returns for 127 yards, one punt return for seven yards, and one punt for 46 yards. Anderson appeared in seven games, starting one, during the 1954 season, recording three carries for eight yards, one kick return for 15 yards, one fumble, and one fumble recovery. He became a free agent after the 1954 season. He was a listed as a halfback during his time with the Bears and played both offense and defense. He was 6' tall, weighed 198 pounds, and wore jersey number 46.
