= William Gilbert Anderson =

American teacher and author

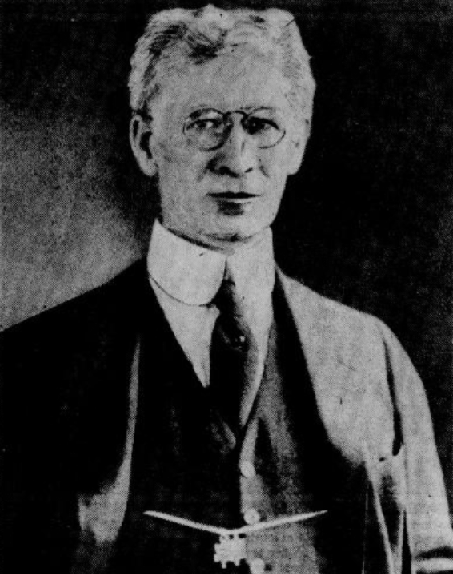
- Born: September 9, 1860; St. Joseph, Michigan
- Died: July 7, 1947 (aged 86)
- Occupations: Physician, writer

William Gilbert Anderson (September 9, 1860 – July 7, 1947) was an American pioneer of physical education, physician and writer.

Anderson was born in St. Joseph, Michigan. He was educated at Amherst College and the University of Wisconsin. He studied at Cleveland Medical College and received his M.D. in 1883. From 1883 to 1892 he worked as a physician at the Adelphi Academy and directed the Brooklyn Normal School for Physical Education (1885–1892). In 1885, he was appointed director of the gymnasium at the Adelphi Academy.

In 1892, he was appointed associate director of Yale University Gymnasium and became its director in 1894. He was the director of physical education at Yale University (1894–1930). He organized the College Physical Education Association in 1897.

Anderson was an organizer for the American Association for the Advancement of Physical Education, founded in 1885. His Normal School of Gymnastics in New Haven, Connecticut became Arnold College and is part of the University of Bridgeport. Dr. Anderson was elected into the National Academy of Kinesiology (née American Academy of Physical Education) in 1938 as Fellow #39.

== Publications ==
- Light Gymnastics: A Guide to Systematic Instruction in Physical Training (1890)
- Methods of Teaching Gymnastics (1896)
- Anderson's Physical Education: Health and Strength, Grace and Symmetry (1897)
- The Making of a Perfect Man (1901)
- Manual of Physical Training (1914)
