= T. Don Hutto Residential Center =

Immigration detention center in Texas, United States

Coordinates: 30°33′53″N 97°25′11″W

The T. Don Hutto Residential Center (formerly known as T. Don Hutto Family Residential Facility, and the T. Don Hutto Family Detention Facility) is a guarded, fenced-in, multi-purpose center currently used to detain foreign nationals awaiting the outcome of their immigration status. The center is located at 1001 Welch Street in the city of Taylor, Texas, within Williamson County. Formerly a medium-security state prison, it is operated by CoreCivic under contract with the U.S. Immigration and Customs Enforcement agency (known as ICE) through an ICE Intergovernmental Service Agreement (IGSA) with Williamson County, Texas. In 2006, Hutto became an immigrant-detention facility detaining immigrant families. The facility was turned into a women's detention center in 2009.

== History ==
In July 1997, the T. Don Hutto Correctional Facility by was opened by CCA as a medium security prison. By 2000, Tennessee-based CCA's stocks hit their lowest, as it suffered from "poor management", prison riots and escapes. It had failed in the 1990s in its "bid to take over the entire prison system of Tennessee." It is named after T. Don Hutto, who along with Robert Crants and Tom Beasley, co-founded CCA on January 28, 1983 in Nashville, Tennessee. In March 2004 CCA announced plans to close the facility, citing low inmate demand.

Immigration detention increased after 9/11. In October 2005, Michael Chertoff, then Secretary of Homeland Security under President George W. Bush, said that DHS would "return every single illegal entrant" apprehended by U.S. authorities without exception and would make use of $90 million in funds appropriated by Congress to add additional beds in immigration detention facilities. By July 2006, Chertoff told a House subcommittee that DHS had "achieved essentially 100 percent catch-and-remove." As a result, by the end of 2006, the number of people in government custody for immigration-law violations increased by 79% from 2005. There were about 14,000 people being detained.

T. Don Hutto re-opened in May 2006 as a "Family Residential Facility" to detain immigrant families. Previously, illegal immigrants with children would be released with a notice to appear before an immigration judge. In some cases, where release was not approved by ICE, children were separated from their parents. Parents were sent to an adult facility while children were released to family, or sent to the Office of Refugee Resettlement.

A 2007 report entitled "Locking Up Family Values" by the Women's Refugee Commission and Lutheran Immigration and Refugee Services documented conditions in the facility. The detainees were women and their children - most of whom appeared to be under the age of 12. The report noted that most of the residents were from Central and South America. However, there were also Africans, Asians, Europeans, and Middle Easterners. Many of the families held at the Hutto facility were awaiting adjudication of their claims for relief or asylum. Many of these families of the families held at the former prison are charged with no offenses other than illegal entry.

The American Civil Liberties Union filed a lawsuit against ICE in March 2007 on behalf of 10 juvenile plaintiffs that were housed in the facility at the time claiming that the standards by which they were housed was not in compliance with the government's detention standards for this population. The claims were, amongst other things, improper educational opportunities, inadequate privacy, and substandard health care. The relief being sought was the release of the plaintiffs. In August 2007, after the plaintiffs were no longer housed at the facility, the ACLU settled the lawsuit claiming that the situations at the facility had "significantly improved".

In 2007, Justice Sam Sparks approved the settlement between the ACLU and ICE that greatly improved conditions for immigrant children and their families who were detained at the facility. Dozens of children were released with their families as a result of the settlement. In response to the harsh treatment of young children in T. Don Hutto, Judge Sparks established "the government would have to establish clear rules for how to detain families safely and humanely. And although officials at Hutto might be making changes now, he noted, didn't Lawrence have a feeling it was merely because the defendants knew, on account of the lawsuit, that 'the hammer was coming down'?" He said that he was beginning to wonder who was in charge "out there, either C.C.A. or the government. It's very troubling to me."

The Least of These is a documentary based on the lawsuit and sub-par conditions.

"[A]fter years of controversy, media exposure, and a lawsuit", in 2009, the Obama Administration closed T. Don Hutto Family Detention Facility, the United States’ "largest family immigration detention facility." "Conditions at the T. Don Hutto Family Detention Facility, and the impact of detention on families and children, proved that family detention could not be carried out humanely." On August 6, 2009, federal officials announced that T. Don Hutto would no longer house immigrant families. Instead, only female detainees will be housed there. ICE and Williamson County entered into a new contract, changing the facility to a non-criminal women's only detention center. In September 2009, the last families left the facility and were moved to the much smaller Berks Family Residential Center in Pennsylvania.

In 2010 a former supervisor at T. Don Hutto was arrested on charges related to alleged sexual assault at the Detention Facility he was convicted of 5 misdemeanor charges.

In 2017 the FBI initiated a civil rights investigation against the center following allegations of guards sexually assaulting and sexually harassing detainees, and retaliation against those who filed complaints about the abuse.

Williamson County commissioners in Taylor voted 4-1 on June 25, 2018, in the wake of a crisis of immigrant detention of children separated from their mothers who had been taken into custody, to end its participation in an Intergovernmental Agreement (IGA) with CoreCivic, in 2019. The facility was holding some of those imprisoned mothers.
