= 2028 United States Senate special election in Tennessee =

- November 7, 2028
Party	Republican	Democratic
Incumbent U.S. senator
TBD

The 2028 United States Senate special election in Tennessee will be held on November 7, 2028, to elect a member of the United States Senate to represent the state of Tennessee. The winner will complete the term won in 2024 by Marsha Blackburn, who will resign to become governor.

This will be the first U.S. Senate special election in Tennessee since 1994. Democrats have not won a U.S. Senate election in Tennessee since 1990.

== Interim appointment ==
After Marsha Blackburn won the 2026 Tennessee gubernatorial election she will be required to resign as a U.S. Senator. On August 7, 2026 Blackburn said if she won the gubernatorial election, she would appoint her successor to the Senate. U.S. Representatives Chuck Fleischmann and Tim Burchett have expressed interest in taking the seat. The appointee will serve until the result of the special election is certified.

A poll by Spry Strategies showed Republican voters preferred Burchett as Blackburn's replacement in the Senate, with 45% of the vote. Other potential candidates named were (in order of popularity) Glenn Jacobs, Chuck Fleischmann, Stuart McWhorter, Cameron Sexton, and Damon Hiniger.

On October 17, 2026, U.S. Secretary of Defense Pete Hegseth attended a University of Tennessee football game alongside Blackburn, fueling speculation that he may be appointed. Later that month, Puck reported that Hegseth has been looking at a Senate appointment amidst a possible firing or impeachment vote following the 2026 midterm elections. However, Hegseth later said that he would fight a possible impeachment and declined to resign from his position.

By November 7, 2026, Blackburn's shortlist had reportedly narrowed to Jacobs, Burchett, Fleischmann, and McWhorter.

== Republican primary ==
On August 6, 2025, Marsha Blackburn declared her bid for governor. Two days later on August 8, 2025, congressmen Chuck Fleischmann and Tim Burchett expressed interest in taking the seat. On June 23, 2026, Damon T. Hininger, the former CEO of private prison company CoreCivic, expressed interest in running for Blackburn's seat if she wins the governorship. Some sources indicate Knox County mayor Glenn Jacobs and Commissioner of Economic and Community Development Stuart McWhorter might be possible contenders for the seat.

=== Candidates ===
==== Declared ====
- Tim Burchett, U.S. representative from Tennessee's 2nd congressional district (2019–present)

==== Publicly expressed interest ====
- Chuck Fleischmann, U.S. representative from Tennessee's 3rd congressional district (2011–present)
- Damon T. Hininger, former CEO of CoreCivic
- Andy Ogles, outgoing U.S. representative from Tennessee's 5th congressional district (2023–present)

==== Potential ====
- Glenn Jacobs, former mayor of Knox County (2018–2026) and former WWE wrestler
- Jack Johnson, majority leader of the Tennessee Senate (2019–present) from the 27th district (2007–present)
- Stuart McWhorter, deputy governor of Tennessee and Tennessee commissioner of economic and community development
- Cameron Sexton, speaker of the Tennessee House of Representatives (2019–present) from the 25th district (2011–present)

==== Declined ====
- Pete Hegseth, U.S. secretary of defense (2025–present)
- Bill Lee, outgoing governor of Tennessee (2019–present)
