= ICLA =

iCLA or ICLA can refer to

- Yamanashi Gakuin University's International College of Liberal Arts
- International Comparative Literature Association
- Instituto Científico y Literario de Toluca
- Information, counselling and legal assistance in Norwegian Refugee Council
- International Cognitive Linguistics Association
- Institute for International and Comparative Law in Africa
- International Civil Liberties Alliance
- Indian Claims Limitations Act
- Initial Custody Level Assessment by Idaho Department of Juvenile Corrections

== Also ==
- Icla Municipality in Bolivia
- Icla Formation
