= List of law enforcement agencies in Idaho =

This is a list of law enforcement agencies in the U.S. state of Idaho.

According to the US Bureau of Justice Statistics' 2008 Census of State and Local Law Enforcement Agencies, the state had 117 law enforcement agencies employing 3,146 sworn police officers, about 206 for each 100,000 residents.

== State agencies ==
- Idaho Department of Correction
- Idaho Department of Juvenile Corrections
- Idaho Fish and Game Commission
  - Idaho Conservation Officers
- Idaho State Police
  - Idaho State Fire Marshal
  - Idaho Weigh Station Division
  - Idaho State Brand Inspector

== County agencies ==
- Ada County Sheriff's Office
- Adams County Sheriff's Office
- Bannock County Sheriff's Office
- Bear Lake County Sheriff's Office
- Benewah County Sheriff's Office
- Bingham County Sheriff's Office
- Blaine County Sheriff's Office
- Boise County Sheriff's Office
- Bonner County Sheriff's Office
- Bonneville County Sheriff's Office
- Boundary County Sheriff's Office
- Butte County Sheriff's Office
- Camas County Sheriff's Office
- Canyon County Sheriff's Office
- Caribou County Sheriff's Office
- Cassia County Sheriff's Office
- Clark County Sheriff's Office
- Clearwater County Sheriff's Office
- Custer County Sheriff's Office
- Elmore County Sheriff's Office
- Franklin County Sheriff's Office
- Fremont County Sheriff's Office
- Gem County Sheriff's Office
- Gooding County Sheriff's Office
- Idaho County Sheriff's Office
- Jefferson County Sheriff's Office
- Jerome County Sheriff's Office
- Kootenai County Sheriff's Office
- Latah County Sheriff's Office
- Lemhi County Sheriff's Office
- Lewis County Sheriff's Office
- Lincoln County Sheriff's Office
- Madison County Sheriff's Office
- Minidoka County Sheriff's Office
- Nez Perce County Sheriff's Office
- Oneida County Sheriff's Office
- Owyhee County Sheriff's Office
- Payette County Sheriff's Office
- Power County Sheriff's Office
- Shoshone County Sheriff's Office
- Teton County Sheriff's Office
- Twin Falls County Sheriff's Office
- Valley County Sheriff's Office
- Washington County Sheriff's Office

== City agencies ==
- Aberdeen Police Department
- Albion Police Department
- American Falls Police Department
- Ashton Police Department
- Blackfoot Police Department
- Boise Police Department
- Bonners Ferry Police Department
- Buhl Police Department
- Caldwell Police Department
- Cascade Police Department
- Chubbuck Police Department
- Coeur d'Alene Police Department
- Coeur d'Alene Tribal Police Department
- Emmett Police Department
- Filer Police Department
- Fort Hall Tribal Police Department
- Fruitland Police Department
- Garden City Police Department
- Gooding Police Department
- Grangeville Police Department
- Hailey Police Department
- Heyburn Police Department
- Homedale Police Department
- Idaho City Police Department
- Idaho Falls Police Department
- Inkom Police Department
- Iona Police Department
- Jerome Police Department
- Kamiah Marshal's Office
- Kellogg Police Department
- Ketchum Police Department
- Kimberly-Hansen Police Department
- Lewiston Police Department
- McCall Police Department
- Meridian Police Department
- Montpelier Police Department
- Moscow Police Department
- Mountain Home Police Department
- Nampa Police Department
- Nez Perce Tribal Police Department
- Orofino Police Department
- Osburn Police Department
- Parma Police Department
- Payette Police Department
- Pinehurst Police Department
- Plummer Police Department
- Pocatello Police Department
- Ponderay Police Department
- Post Falls Police Department
- Preston Police Department
- Priest River Police Department
- Rathdrum Police Department
- Rexburg Police Department
- Rigby Police Department
- Rupert Police Department
- Salmon Police Department
- Sandpoint Police Department
- Shelley Police Department
- Soda Springs Police Department
- Spirit Lake Police Department
- Sun Valley Police Department
- Troy Police Department
- Twin Falls Police Department
- Ucon Police Department
- Weiser Police Department
- Wendell Police Department
- Wilder Police Department

== Tribal agencies ==
- Coeur d’Alene Tribal Police
- Fort Hall Police Department
- Kootenai Tribal Police

== School agencies ==
- Boise State University Security
- College of Western Idaho campus safety and security
- Idaho State University department of public safety
- North Idaho College campus security
- University of Idaho security services

== Defunct agencies ==
- Alameda Village Police Department
- Arco Police Department
- Athol Police Department
- Avery Police Department
- Bellevue Marshal's Office
- Boise Airport Police Department
- Burks Police Department
- Challis Police Department
- Clark Fork Police Department
- Council Police Department
- Deary Police Department
- Declo Police Department
- Elk City Police Department
- Fairfield Police Department
- Glenns Ferry Police Department
- Hagerman Police Department
- Hansen Police Department
- Hayden Police Department
- Hazelton Police Department
- Horseshoe Bend Police Department
- Idaho Falls Airport Police Department
- Juliaetta Police Department
- Ketchum Police Department
- Lapwai Police Department
- Lava Hot Springs Police Department
- Leadore Police Department
- Malad City Police Department
- Malta Police Department
- Murtaugh Police Department
- New Plymouth Police Department
- Nezperce Police Department
- Parker Police Department
- Paul Police Department
- Roberts Police Department
- Smelterville Police Department
- Stanley Police Department
- Stites Police Department
- Tensed Police Department
- Wallace Police Department
- Wardner Police Department
- Warren Police Department
- Winchester Police Department
