= Idaho Department of Correction =

Agency overview
- Employees: 2,000

Jurisdictional structure
- Operations jurisdiction: Idaho, USA
- Map of Idaho Department of Correction's jurisdiction
- General nature: Local civilian police

Operational structure
- Headquarters: Boise, Idaho
- Agency executive: Bree Derrick, Director

Website
- https://www.idoc.idaho.gov/

The Idaho Department of Correction (IDOC) operates ten prisons, five community release centers and 20 probation and parole offices in seven districts located throughout the state of Idaho. The agency has its headquarters in Boise.

IDOC employs about 2,000 people under the leadership of Director Bree Derrick. Most of them are correctional officers and probation and parole officers. They are all certified peace officers and train at the Peace Officer Standards Training Academy in Meridian.

== Private prisons ==
As of 2016, IDOC contracts with one private prison firm, Management and Training Corporation, to run one facility: the Correctional Alternative Placement Program, a 432-bed center focused on treatment programs and inmates with cognitive issues. It opened in the summer of 2010 as Correctional Alternative Placement Program (CAPP). On July 1, 2023, IDOC re-purchased the CAPP facility and renamed it to Mountain View Transformation Center or MVTC.

Idaho entered into its first private prison project in July 2000, opening the Idaho Correctional Center with operator Corrections Corporation of America. The state paid $29 million annually for the mixed-security prison. An increasing number of lawsuits related to violent incidents, chronic understaffing and fraudulent recordkeeping revealed deep operational problems. The Idaho State Police and the FBI launched investigations. IDOC took over the facility in 2014. As part of the long legal aftermath, in July 2015 IDOC itself faced federal court allegations that it had falsified inmate medical records, and was out of compliance with previous court orders.

Idaho has also exported prisoners to private prisons in other states. From roughly 1998 to 2008, Idaho had placed inmates at Prairie Correctional Facility (Appleton, Minnesota), the Newton County Correctional Center (Newton, Texas), Dickens County Correctional Center, (Spur, Texas), Val Verde Correctional Facility (Del Rio, Texas), the Bill Clayton Detention Center (Littlefield, Texas), and the North Fork Correctional Facility (Sayre, Oklahoma). This cycle ended around July 2009.

Once again in July 2012, IDOC exported about 200 prisoners to the Kit Carson Correctional Center in Burlington, Colorado, a contract that ended in mid-2016 and the closure of that prison.

== Private partnerships ==
The department has contracted with JPay, a private firm that provides email and money-transfer services to prisoners. The department receives a commission for these transactions.

== Facilities ==
Idaho Prisons — green=state, red=federal (Hover mouse over pog to popup clickable link)

=== South Boise Prison Complex ===
The South Boise Prison Complex is located in unincorporated Ada County, five miles (8.0 km) south of the Boise Airport and nine miles (14 km) east of Kuna. It has six prison facilities and one community work center.

- Mountain View Transformation Center formerly The Correctional Alternative Placement Program (CAPP) facility (43°27′42″N 116°14′08″W) opened July 1, 2010. Management and Training Corporation of Ogden, Utah built the facility and operates the program. CAPP offers intensive treatment programs for substance abuse and cognitive issues for up to 432 low to moderate risk male offenders needing substance abuse treatment. It houses three different groups of offenders: probationers, parolees and retained jurisdiction. Idaho took over after contract expiration in fall of 2023.
- Idaho State Correctional Center. On 7/1/2014 IDOC took over ownership of the building from Corrections Corporation of America. The warden is Randy Valley.
- Idaho State Correctional Institution
- Idaho Maximum Security Institution (IMSI) (43°28′47″N 116°13′24″W) is a high-security state prison. It opened in November 1989 to confine Idaho's most violent offenders. The compound is located within a double perimeter fence reinforced with razor wire, an electronic detection system and a 24-hour armed perimeter patrol. The offender population includes a large number of mental health offenders, including subjects of civil commitments. Thirty beds are dedicated for prisoners with acute mental illness. IMSI has restrictive housing beds dedicated to administrative segregation, disciplinary detention and death row. The remaining beds are allocated for close-custody general population offenders.
- South Boise Women's Correctional Center (SBWCC) (43°28′54″N 116°13′51″W) opened in March 2002 at the site of a former community work center. It is a program-specific, minimum-custody facility designed for female offenders sentenced to a retained jurisdiction commitment by the court. It provides a sentencing alternative for the courts to target those offenders who might, after a period of programming and evaluation, be viable candidates for probation rather than incarceration. This facility has a safe operating capacity of 248.
- South Idaho Correctional Institution (SICI) (43°28′33″N 116°12′42″W) is a minimum-security prison. It receives mail through a post office box in Boise. SICI is a working facility, which houses male minimum custody offenders in a dormitory setting. Those offenders who choose to work will have to apply for available positions and is expected to work whether inside or outside the facility compound. Sex offenders are not allowed to go off compound for work. Road crews for the Idaho Transportation Department and fire fighting crews for the U.S. Forest Service are located here. SICI also houses offenders who have almost completed their sentence (toppers). Toppers do not have to work if they choose not to. SICI also operates the final pre-release program for about 90 percent of offenders paroling from the system. The Idaho board of correction approved women residents to be housed here to alleviate overcrowding.
- The South Idaho Correctional Institution-Community Work Center (CWC) houses minimum-custody male offenders in a dormitory setting. Most offenders are assigned a job and work inside or outside the facility. Vocational Work Projects include road crews for the Idaho Transportation Department and conservation and fire fighting crews for the U.S. Forest Service. Some offenders serve as workers in the Correctional Industries program. It also operates the pre-release program for the majority of offenders paroling from the system.

=== Idaho Correctional Institution-Orofino ===
Idaho Correctional Institution-Orofino (ICIO) (46°29′31″N 116°15′39″W) is a modified old state school and hospital mental health building in Orofino. A new wing was added in 1988. It is a standard prison designed for male offenders of all custody levels. The facility also houses protective custody offenders. Until April 1994, the state's female offenders were housed in one tier here, but due to litigation, females are now housed at the Pocatello Women's Correctional Center. Offender work programs, including correctional industries, are coordinated with schooling, counseling and recreational opportunities. The facility has a safe operating capacity is 541. The warden is Teresa Hill and the deputy warden of operations is Ken Shriver.

=== North Idaho Correctional Institution ===
North Idaho Correctional Institution (NICI) (46.08°N 116.428°W), northwest of Cottonwood. A former radar station of the U.S. Air Force below Cottonwood Butte, it has been in the state correction system since 1974. It currently houses residents of the retained jurisdiction program. At one time it housed the sex offender treatment program, before it was moved to ICI-O.

=== Pocatello Women's Correctional Center ===
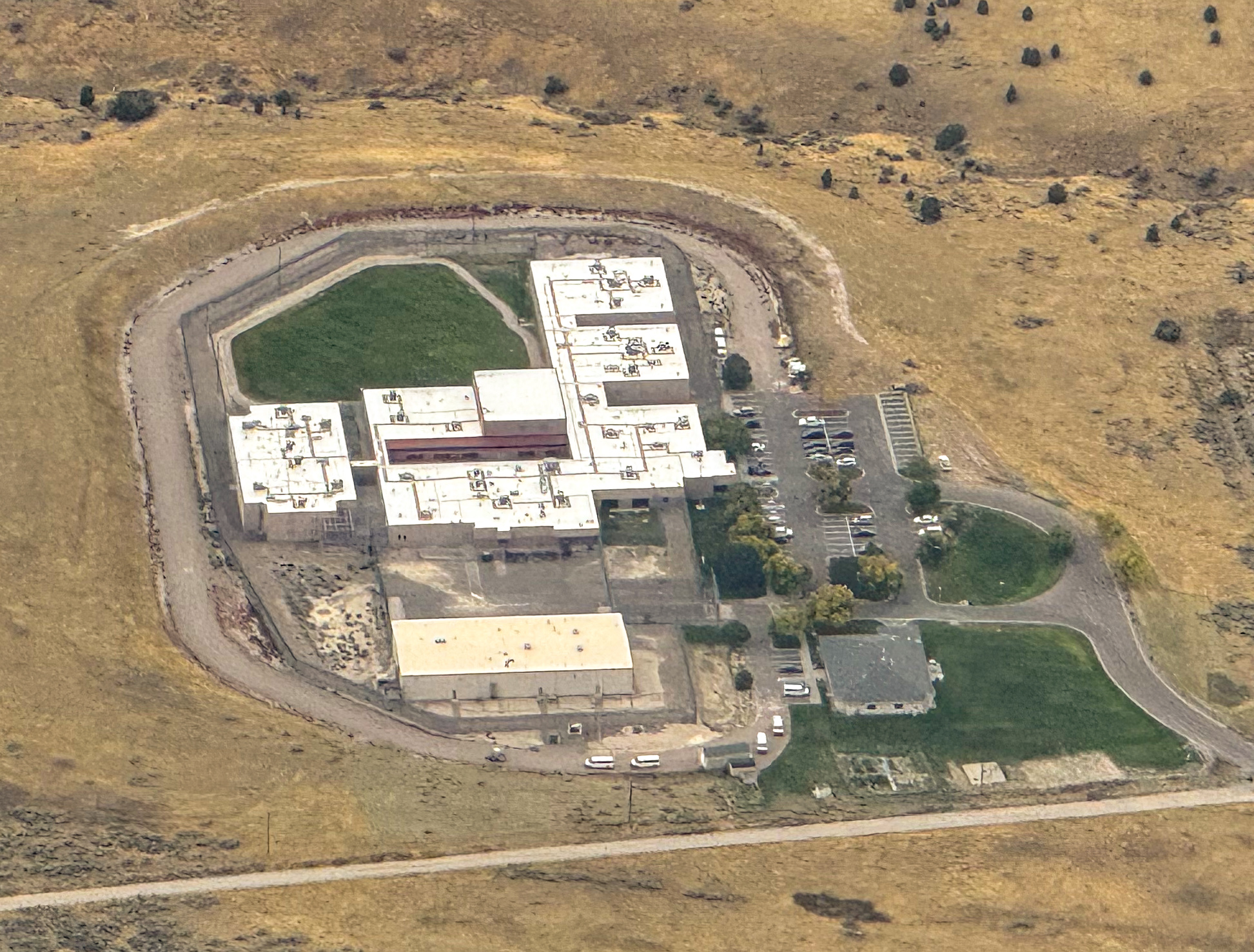
Aerial view of Pocatello Women's Correctional Center

Pocatello Women's Correctional Center (PWCC) (42°50′33″N 112°27′02″W) is a prison for women located in the southwestern portion of Pocatello. It opened in April 1994. It is designed specifically to house all custody levels of female offenders. The facility is the first of its kind for the Department of Corrections, and it is designed specifically to meet the special needs of female offenders and their programs. The facility has an operating capacity of 289 female offenders and houses all custody levels. In 2026, Luke Kormylo was made the new warden. The PWCC houses the female death row prisoners sentenced by the state of Idaho, which currently holds only one prisoner who awaits execution, Robin Lee Row.

=== St. Anthony Work Camp ===
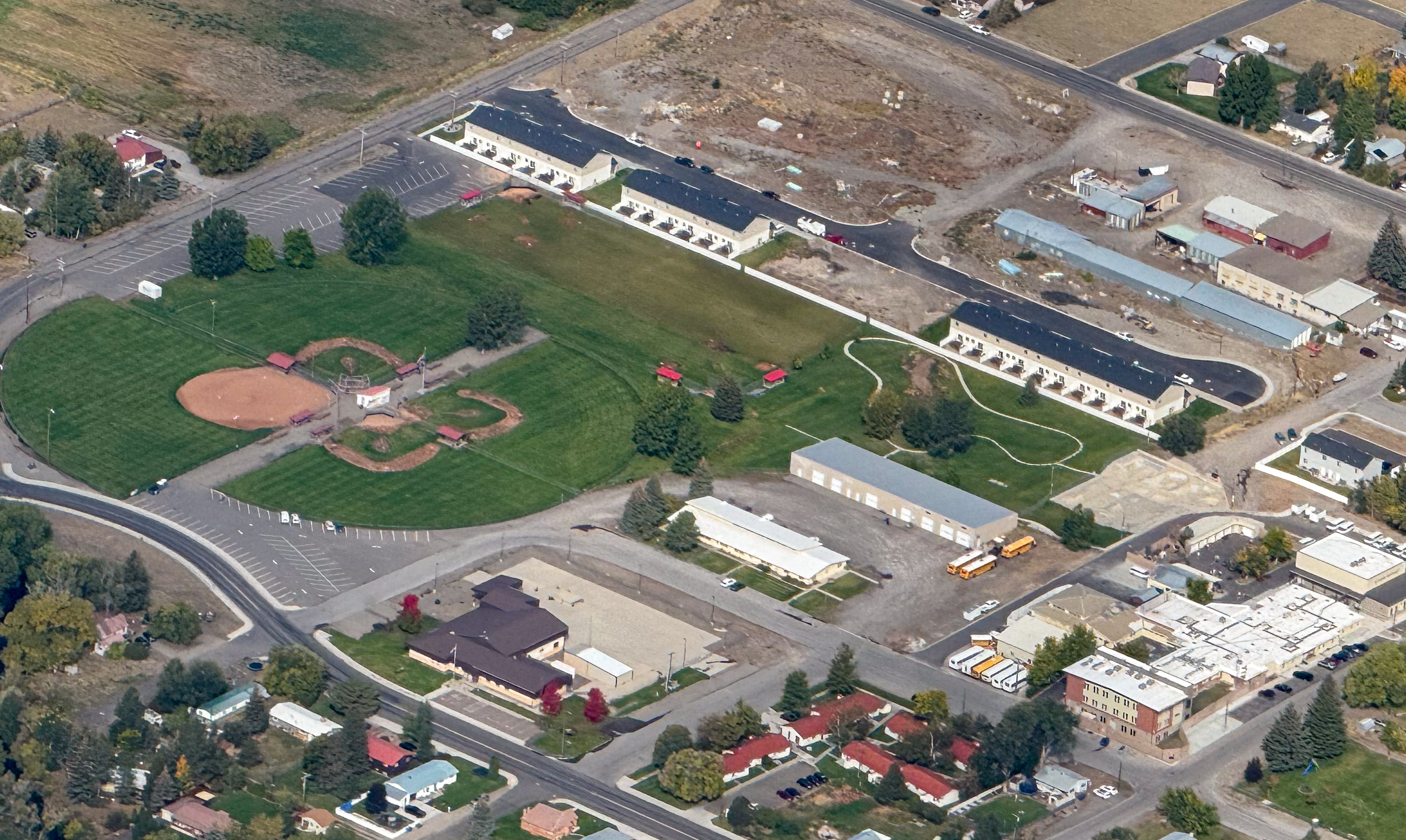
St. Anthony Work Camp aerial view

St. Anthony Work Camp (SAWC) (43°58′05″N 111°41′37″W) is located in St. Anthony. It is designed to house 240 low-risk, minimum-custody male residents. The facility's primary focus is to provide vocational work project opportunities offering full-time, constructive, paid employment to residents. This is accomplished through contracted work and public service projects with government agencies, non-profit organizations and private employers. The program helps residents develop good work habits, a positive work ethic and marketable work skills while providing a financial resource to meet immediate and future needs.

=== Work centers ===
- Nampa Community Work Center
- East Boise Community Work Center
- Twin Falls Community Work Center, closed August 1, 2011.
- Idaho Falls Community Work Center

== See also ==
- List of law enforcement agencies in Idaho
- List of United States state correction agencies
- List of U.S. state prisons
