= Idaho State Correctional Institution =

Prison in Idaho, United States

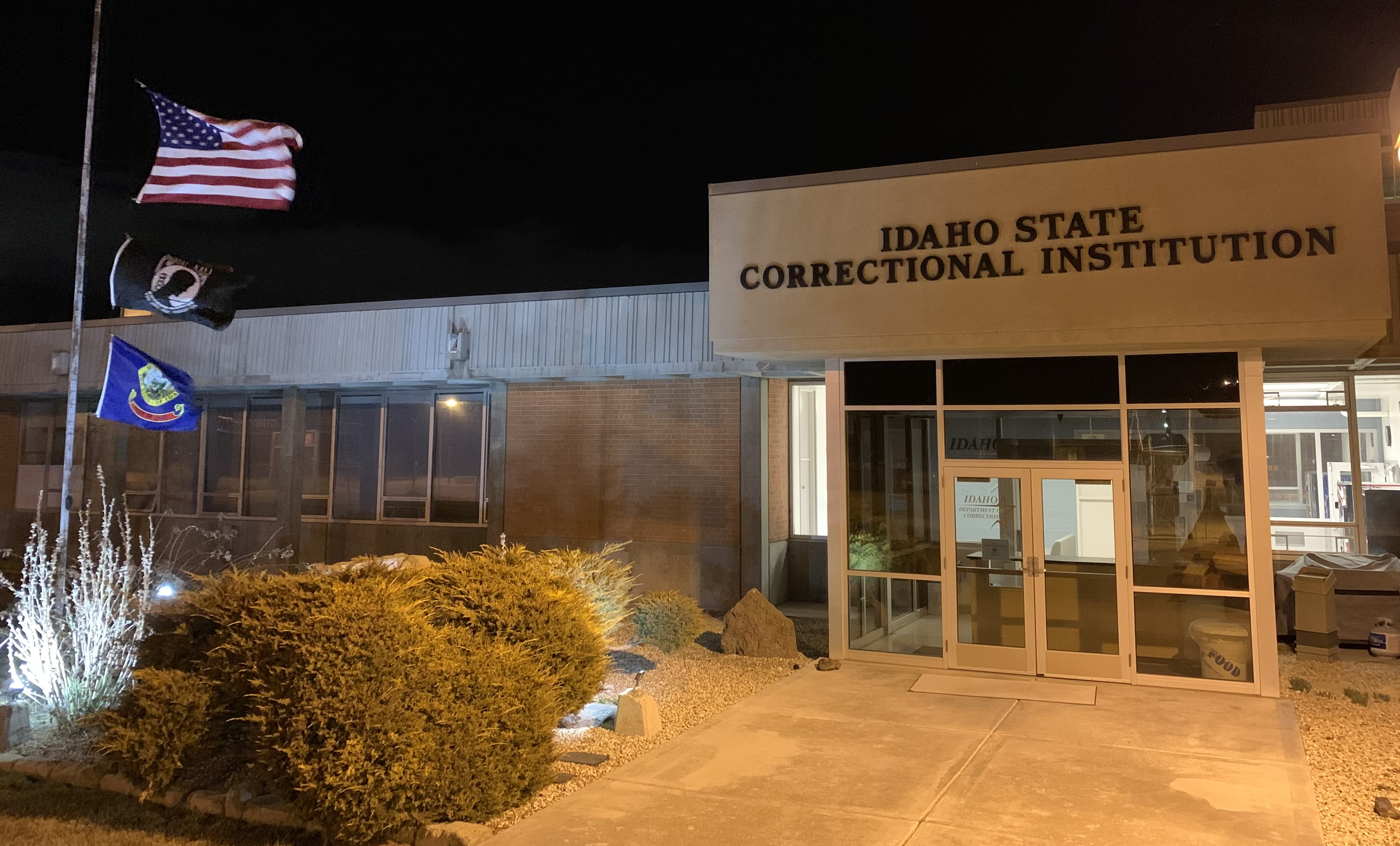
- Entrance to ISCI administration building
- Interactive map of Idaho State Correctional Institution
- Location: 13500 South Pleasant Valley Road east of Kuna, Idaho, U.S.; 43°28′41″N 116°13′12″W
- Security class: medium
- Capacity: 1,446
- Opened: December 1973; 52 years ago
- Managed by: Idaho Department of Correction
- Director: Bree Derrick
- Warden: Nick Baird

Idaho State Correctional Institution (ISCI), also referred to as "The Yard," is an Idaho Department of Correction state prison for men in unincorporated Ada County, Idaho, east of Kuna. Located in the desert five miles (8 km) south of the Boise Airport, it is one of six residential detention facilities of the "South Boise Prison Complex." The others are the Correctional Alternative Placement Program (CAPP), Idaho State Correctional Center (ISCC), Idaho Maximum Security Institution (IMSI), South Boise Women's Correctional Center (SBWCC), and South Idaho Correctional Institution (SICI), also known as "The Farm." At an approximate elevation of 3,050 feet (930 m) above sea level, the complex also includes two community reentry centers.

ISCI is the oldest operating prison in the state, with a capacity of 1,446, with special-use beds for infirmary, outpatient mental health, and geriatric residents. Its reception and diagnostic unit (RDU) serves as the entry point for all men entering Idaho's prison system. ISCI was opened in December 1973 as the state prison, after serious riots in 1971 and 1973 destroyed much of the century-old state penitentiary in east Boise. A riot in the summer of 1980 at the prison caused damages in the millions of dollars, mostly in the maximum security area.

The institution is surrounded by a double fence, patrolled by sentry dogs, with six operational towers to monitor perimeter security and resident movement. The facility includes a religious activities center, a fully-equipped recreation facility with two large tracks and ballfields, an accredited school, a large industrial workspace for vocational rehabilitation and job training programs, and a fully functioning medical clinic with 28 inpatient beds.

ISCI also hosted the Inmate Dog Alliance Program of Idaho (IDAPI). This program takes dogs from the Humane Society, and places them with an inmate. The goal of the program was to prepare the dogs for adoption, as well as providing therapeutic opportunities for the participating residents. This program was retired in 2021 due to COVID.

On Easter Sunday in 1986, convicted felon Claude Dallas escaped from ISCI. Some believe he accomplished this by walking out with a group of visitors, although this remains in dispute. The escape spurred an almost year-long manhunt that ended in suburban southern California.

== Notable Inmates ==
- Brian Draper and Torey Adamcik
- Dan Howard - Former Idaho State trooper who murdered his wife Kendy.
- Ricky Coates Jr.
