= Lake Erie Correctional Institution =

Men's prison in Conneaut, Ohio, United States

- Location within Ohio
- Location: 501 Thompson Road Conneaut, Ohio; 41°56′45.41″N 80°32′16.3″W
- Status: open
- Security class: medium and minimum
- Capacity: 1498
- Opened: 2000; owned by CoreCivic since 2012
- Managed by: CoreCivic

The Lake Erie Correctional Institution is a minimum- and medium-security prison for men located in Conneaut, Ashtabula County, Ohio, owned and operated by CoreCivic under contract with the Ohio Department of Rehabilitation and Correction.

The facility first opened in 2000, has been owned by CCA since 2012, and has a working population of 1750 state inmates.

Lake Erie was the first sale of a state prison in the United States to a private company.

In 2012, Ohio state auditors deducted $500,000 from its contract at Lake Erie for violations such as understaffing, which had given rise to a high rate of violence and smuggled drugs.
