= T. Don Hutto =

American businessman (1935–2021)

Terrell Don Hutto

Director of the Virginia Department of Corrections
- In office 1977–1980
- Governor: Mills Godwin; John N. Dalton

Director of the Arkansas Department of Correction
- In office 1971–1976
- Governor: Dale Bumpers
- Succeeded by: Vernon Housewright

Personal details
- Born: June 8, 1935 Sinton, Texas, U.S.
- Died: October 22, 2021 (aged 86)
- Spouse: Nancy Sue Moore (m. 1960)
- Children: 3 daughters
- Parent(s): Terrell Sanford Hutto and Winnie Elvenia (née Cusler) Hutto
- Education: East Texas State University BA (1958)
- Occupation: Corrections Management executive
- Known for: Co-founder of Corrections Corporation of America (1983)

Terrell Don Hutto (June 8, 1935 – October 22, 2021), was an American businessman and one of the three co-founders of Corrections Corporation of America (CCA), whose establishment marked the beginning of the private prison industry during the era of former President Ronald Reagan. In 1983, Hutto, Robert Crants and Tom Beasley formed CCA and received investments from Jack C. Massey, the founder of Hospital Corporation of America. The T. Don Hutto Residential Center, one of CCA's detention centers, was named after him.

== Parents and family ==
Hutto's parents were Winnie Elvenia Cusler Hutto and Terrell Sanford Hutto, a farmer who died when Hutto was nine years old. Hutto and his wife, Nancy Sue Moore, who were married on June 10, 1960, had three daughters.

== Education ==
Hutto earned his degree in history and sociology at East Texas State University in 1958. He did further studies at the Southern Methodist University (1959), the American University (1964), and Sam Houston State University (1967) but did not earn a master's degree. When he came back to Texas after several years in military service, Hutto passed the prison system accreditation exams and began working in the prison system.

== Ramsey, Texas state prison farm ==
Hutto worked from 1967 to 1971 as a teacher, assistant prison warden and warden at the Ramsey prison farm for African American prisoners in southeastern Texas. The W. F. Ramsey Unit, as it was known then, consisted of five former plantations that used a convict leasing system on working plantations. In 1967 Hutto and his family lived in a plantation home on the prison farm.

While working at Ramsey Unit, Hutto met Bruce Jackson, an ethnographer turned photographer, who was collecting photos as reference material for his research on the songs of African Americans inmates in prisons in Texas. The two became friends, which gave Jackson access to prisons in both Texas and Arkansas.

== Arkansas Department of Corrections ==
Governor of Arkansas Dale Bumpers appointed Hutto as Director of the Arkansas Department of Correction in 1971.

Soon after Winthrop Rockefeller was elected as Arkansas State Governor on January 10, 1967, he received a shocking 67-page report by the Arkansas State Police, that "uncovered systematic corruption and brutality at Tucker farm, where inmates and prison officials alike engaged in torture, beatings and bribery." The report listed the findings of a 1966 State Police investigation ordered by then-Governor Orval Faubus, just before Rockefeller was elected. By 1967, the two male prisons in Arkansas were the smaller Tucker State Prison Farm for younger white prisoners, and the 1,300-inmate Cummins prison, located along the Arkansas River, 75 miles southeast of Little Rock, in Lincoln County for "white and black adult inmates". According to a 1968 Time article entitled "Hell in Arkansas", in the 1960s, the two state penal farms "averaged" profits of "about $1,400,000 over the years..." using prisoners as forced labor.

As part of reform of the Arkansas prison system, Governor Rockefeller created a new Department of Corrections and hired the first professional penologist, Tom Murton, as prison superintendent in 1967. On January 29, 1968, Murton invited the media to witness the unearthing of three decayed skeletal remains in a remote part of the 16,000-acre grounds of the Cummins prison farm. They believed the skeletons were those of prisoners murdered at Cummins, although this was never proven.

According to a March 22, 2018 article in the Arkansas Times, during his short tenure of less than one year, Murton's aggressive approach to uncovering Arkansas' prison scandal with its decades-long systemic corruption, embarrassed Rockefeller and "infuriated conservative politicians". Murton had attracted nationwide media attention and contempt for Arkansas, as news of Bodiesburg, as it was called, spread. Murton's co-authored 1969 book, Accomplices to the Crime: The Arkansas Prison Scandal was the basis for the fictionalized 1980 film Brubaker starring Robert Redford.

As well, in 1969 prisoners, Robert Finney, et al., started a litigation process naming Terrell Don Hutto, et al. The series of cases lasted almost a decade and resulting in the Supreme Court landmark case Hutto v. Finney 437 U.S. 678 (437 U.S. 678 (1978)). It was the first successful lawsuit filed by an inmate against a correctional institution. The case also clarified prison system's unacceptable punitive measures.

Against this backdrop, Hutto was hired by Governor Dale Bumpers in 1971 as the head of the Arkansas Department of Correction, with a mandate of "humanizing" the "convict farms". In 1971, Jackson visited Hutto at Cummins prison. Jackson had gone there to investigate how Hutto was changing Arkansas prisons. However, as he took photos he "found more and more that my interest was in documenting it visually." In 2010, the Albright-Knox Art Gallery and the Center for Documentary Studies at Duke University featured Jackson's Cummins Unit photo collection.

After Bumpers was elected to the United States Senate and David Pryor was elected governor in 1974, Hutto resigned and moved to Virginia in 1976 to become deputy director of the Virginia Department of Corrections.

== American Correctional Association ==
Hutto was president-elect of the American Correctional Association (ACA) from 1984 to 1990. The ACA, which serves as a both the "national regulatory body for prisons" and as a trade association for the American correctional industry, under Hutto's tenure, began to support prison privatization.

== Corrections Corporation of America (CCA) ==
Corrections Corporation of America, (now renamed as CoreCivic), "the world’s first and largest for-profit prison operator", was established by Hutto, Beasley, and Crants in Nashville, Tennessee on January 28, 1983. At the time Beasley served as the chairman of the Tennessee Republican Party, and Crants was the chief financial officer of a real estate company in Nashville. Maurice Sigler, the former chairman of the United States Board of Parole, was a founding member.

In a February 27, 2013 CCA video entitled, "Corrections Corporation of America's Founders Tom Beasley and Don Hutto", Beasley and Hutto said that because of Hutto's reputation through his years of experience in corrections and as president-elect of the American Correctional Association, a first meeting about a potential joint venture to detain undocumented immigrants in Texas, took place between Beasley, Hutto, the Federal Bureau of Prisons and the now defunct Immigration and Naturalization Service (INS) which operated under U.S. Department of Justice from 1933 to 2003. As a result of the initial meeting, CCA were awarded an RFB with INS, which was the "first contract ever to design, build, finance and operate a secure correctional facility." This marked the beginning of the private prison industry. Hutto, described how at the time, INS had "unrealistic expectations" putting pressure on CCA to have the facilities ready by early January, ninety days from the signing of the contract. In a desperate attempt to find a solution, Hutto and Beasley flew to Houston, Texas and after several days managed to negotiate a deal with the owner of Olympic Motel—a "pair of non-descript two-story buildings" on "I-45 North between Tidwell and Parker"—to hire their family and friends to staff the re-purposed motel for four months. On Super Bowl Sunday at the end of January, the first 87 undocumented immigrants were personally processed by Hutto and CCA received their first payment.

By 2016, Corrections Corporation of America (CCA) along with Geo Group were running "more than 170 prisons and detention centres". CCA's revenues in 2015 were $1.79bn.

Hutto died on October 22, 2021, at the age of 86.

== Awards ==
In 1987 Hutto received the American Correctional Association's E.R. Cass Correctional Achievement Award, the ACA's highest professional honor.
