= Damon T. Hininger =

American businessman

Damon Hininger
- Born: Leavenworth, Kansas, U.S.
- Education: Kansas State University (BS); Belmont University (MBA)
- Spouse: Carrie Hininger
- Children: 2

Damon T. Hininger is an American businessman. He is the chief executive officer of CoreCivic, formerly Corrections Corporation of America.

== Education ==
Born in Leavenworth, Kansas, Damon T. Hininger graduated from Kansas State University, where he received a Bachelor of Science degree in sociology with a specialization in criminology. He received a master's degree in business administration from Belmont University in Nashville.

== Career ==
Hininger joined Corrections Corporation of America as a correctional officer at their Leavenworth Detention Center in Leavenworth, Kansas in 1992. Two years later, in 1994, he became a training manager at their Central Arizona Detention Center in Florence, Arizona. By 1995, he joined the corporate headquarters in Nashville. He has served as its chief executive officer since 2009. In 2014, he announced his plan to offer more educational training for prisoners to find employment once their sentence comes to an end.

Under Hininger's leadership, the Corrections Corporation of America rebranded as "CoreCivic" and was sued—along with Hininger personally—by shareholders for inflating its stock price by misrepresenting the quality and value of its services following the federal Bureau of Prisons' decision to phase out CoreCivic's contracts due to outsized safety and security concerns. The suit was settled for $56 million. Hininger's deposition in the case is sealed, and CoreCivic has opposed efforts to unseal it.

He served on the board of directors of the Nashville Area Chamber of Commerce.

== Political activity ==
Hininger donated US$1,500 in political contributions to both Megan Barry and David Fox during the 2015 Nashville mayoral election.

Hininger's company CoreCivic donated $500,000 to the second inauguration of Donald Trump in 2025. CoreCivic was one of the Trump administration's largest donors during the past campaign, surpassing $150 million.

== Belmont University ==
Hininger served on the board of trustees of Belmont University until 2021. In 2018, students at Belmont University called for Hininger's removal from the board of trustees due to CoreCivic's profits from migrant detention.

== Personal life ==
Hininger is married to Carrie Hininger. They have two children. They reside in Brentwood, Tennessee, and attend the First Presbyterian Church of Nashville.
