= Doctor R. Crants =

American businessman (1944–2026)

- Born: Doctor Robert Crants; November 17, 1944; Salamanca, New York, U.S.
- Died: February 22, 2026 (aged 81)
- Education: Lansing Central High School; United States Military Academy; Harvard University
- Occupation: Businessman
- Known for: Co-founder of Corrections Corporation of America
- Spouse: Shirley Crants
- Children: 2 sons, including D. Robert Crants, III, 1 daughter

Doctor Robert Crants (November 17, 1944 – February 22, 2026) was an American businessman. He was a co-founder of the Corrections Corporation of America, and its chairman and chief executive officer from 1994 to 1999.

== Early life ==
Doctor Robert Crants was born in Salamanca, New York, on November 17, 1944. His mother gave him the first name of "Doctor", but he did not generally use it as an adult. He was one quarter Seneca from his maternal side, and he grew up on a Seneca reservation in New York.

He was educated at Lansing Central High School. He graduated from the United States Military Academy in West Point, New York, where he was Thomas W. Beasley's roommate. He served in Vietnam and Southeast Asia. He received a Master of Business Administration degree from Harvard Business School and a Juris Doctor degree from Harvard Law School in 1974.

== Career ==
Crants was chief financial officer of a real estate company in Nashville, Tennessee. Later, he founded Broadcast Management Services, and established several television stations.

In 1983, he co-founded Corrections Corporation of America with his former roommate, Thomas W. Beasley, by then a leader in the Republican Party in Tennessee, and T. Don Hutto, creating a private prison management company. CCA received initial investments from Jack C. Massey, the founder of Hospital Corporation of America, Vanderbilt University, the Tennessee Valley Authority.

He was its treasurer. By 1987, Crants became president. He was chairman and chief executive officer from 1994 to 1999. As of 2015, it is the largest prison management company in the nation. By 2016, Corrections Corporation of America (CCA) along with Geo Group were running "more than 170 prisons and detention centres". CCA's revenues in 2015 were $1.79bn.

Shortly after the September 11 attacks in 2001, Crants co-founded the Homeland Security Corporation with one of his sons, D. Robert Crants, III. Crants was its chief executive officer, while Joseph S. Johnson is president.

== Personal life and death ==
Crants was married to Shirley Crants. They had two sons and a daughter. Crants died on February 22, 2026, at the age of 81.
