= Thomas W. Beasley =

American lawyer and businessman

- Born: January 8, 1943 (age 83); Dixon Springs, Tennessee, U.S.
- Education: Smith County High School; United States Military Academy; Vanderbilt University Law School
- Occupations: Private prisons, lawyer, political activist, businessman
- Known for: Co-founder of Corrections Corporation of America
- Spouse: Wendy Williams
- Children: 3
- Parent(s): Lewis Beasley; Elizabeth Beasley

Thomas Wilson Beasley (born 1943) is an American lawyer, political activist and businessman based in Tennessee. He was chairman of the Tennessee Republican Party from 1977 to 1981.

In 1983, he was a co-founder of CoreCivic, formerly Corrections Corporation of America (CCA), a private prison management company. He was its president and chief executive officer from 1983 to 1987, and its chairman from 1987 to 1994. As of 2015, it has become the largest prison management company in the United States.

== Early life ==
Thomas W. Beasley was born on January 8, 1943, on a farm owned by his family from the late 1790s in Smith County, Tennessee.

He was educated at the Smith County High School in Carthage, Tennessee. He graduated from the United States Military Academy in West Point, New York in 1966. He served in the United States Army in Vietnam, the Panama Canal, and Nicaragua. He was awarded a Silver Star and two Bronze Stars.

Beasley returned to graduate school after the military. He received a juris doctor degree from the Vanderbilt University Law School in 1973. While in law school, he rented a garage apartment from future Tennessee governor and U.S. senator Lamar Alexander. As governor, Alexander supported CCA's takeover of the Tennessee prison system and was also among the top recipients of CCA campaign donations.

== Career ==
Beasley worked as a lawyer for the law firm White, Regen, Burch, and Beasley from 1973 to 1977.

He was chairman of the Tennessee Republican Party from 1977 to 1981. Beasley is credited with getting Robin Beard elected to the United States House of Representatives.

Beasley was chairman of Community Education Partners. He was on the board of directors of the Education Corporation of America and the Horizon Resources Group. He is a member of the American Bar Association and the American Correctional Association.

=== Corrections Corporation of America ===
In the early 1980s, Beasley and his former roommate, Nashville lawyer, businessman and Republican presidential fund-raiser for Reagan, Robert Crants met an executive of the Magic Stove Company who "said he thought it would be a heck of a venture for a young man: To solve the prison problem and make a lot of money at the same time" (CCA Source 2003). On January 28, 1983, Crants, Beasley, who was then Tennessee Republican chairman and T. Don Hutto founded Corrections Corporation of America, a private prison management company. CCA received initial investments from Jack C. Massey, the founder of Hospital Corporation of America, Vanderbilt University, the Tennessee Valley Authority. Beasley served as its president and chief executive officer from 1983 to 1987, and as its chairman from 1987 to 1994.

In 2000, he was appointed as the interim chief executive officer of CCA and Prison Realty Trust, as the latter firm merged with CCA. In the early 21st century, CCA had become the largest private prison management company in the United States. By 2016, Corrections Corporation of America (CCA) along with Geo Group were running "more than 170 prisons and detention centres". CCA's revenues in 2015 were $1.79 billion.

== Philanthropy ==
Beasley was on the Tennessee Board of Regents and the board of trustees of Cumberland University, a private university in Lebanon, Tennessee. In 1997, Beasley endowed the Thomas W. Beasley Scholarship at the Vanderbilt University Law School for United States Army veterans. In 2006, he received the Distinguished Alumnus Award from the law school. The Tom 'Wish' Beasley/Alumni Sports Center at Smith County High School is named in his honor.

Beasley was on the boards of trustees of the Tennessee Nature Conservancy and Leadership Nashville. He is a former member of the Nashville Rotary Club. In 2011, the State of Tennessee passed Resolution 248 in his honor.

== Personal life ==
He married Wendy Williams on December 29, 1973. They have three children Jeb, Matt, and Kristin Beasley.
