= Idaho State Police =

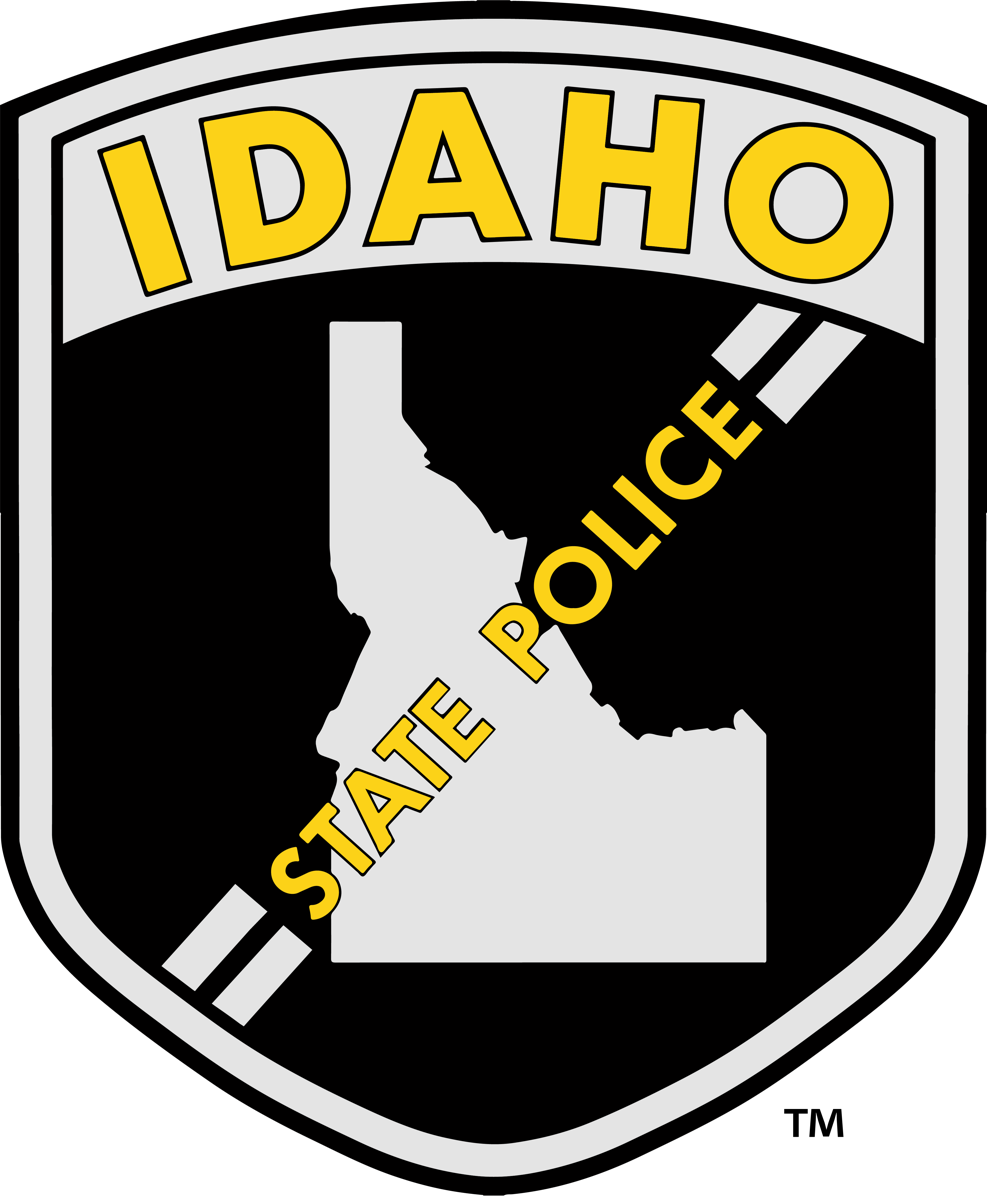
- Abbreviation: ISP
- Motto: Committed to serving and protecting the lives, property, and constitutional rights of people in Idaho.

Agency overview
- Formed: February 20, 1939; 87 years ago
- Preceding agency: Bureau of Constabulary May 18, 1919; 107 years ago (dissolved in 1923)
- Employees: 700+ full and part time

Jurisdictional structure
- Operations jurisdiction: Idaho, US
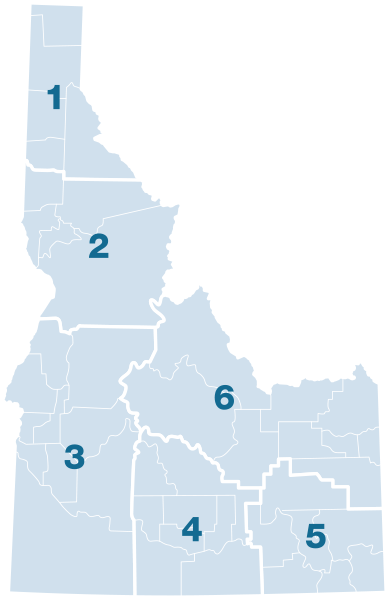
- ISP Patrol Districts
- Area: 83,642 square miles (216,630 km^{2})
- Population: 1,716,943 (2017 est.)
- Constituting instrument: Idaho State Code
- General nature: Civilian police

Operational structure
- Headquarters: Meridian, Idaho
- Commissioned Troopers: 379 (as of 2024)
- Professional Civilian Staffs: 278 full-time (as of 2024)
- Agency executive: Colonel Bill Gardiner, Director
- Child agency: Idaho Peace Officer Standards and Training (POST); Idaho Racing Commission; State Brands Inspector

Facilities
- Districts: 6

Website
- isp.idaho.gov

The Idaho State Police (ISP) is the statewide law enforcement agency for the State of Idaho. It began as the Bureau of Constabulary, created on May 18, 1919, under the new Department of Law Enforcement, to detect and investigate crime, "order abatement of public nuisances and to enforce such orders by appropriate court action, to suppress riots, prevent wrongs to children and animals that are inhibited by law." The state constabulary was also charged with the organization of various state, county and municipal peace officers. The bureau was dissolved by the state legislature in 1923.

The present force, called the Idaho State Police, was formed 87 years ago in 1939, when Governor C. A. Bottolfsen signed the bill creating it on February 20.

== Divisions ==
The Idaho State Police is divided geographically into six districts, with headquarters (and training facility) in Meridian, west of Boise. District offices (1–3) are located in Coeur d'Alene, Lewiston, and Meridian. District offices (4–6) are located in Jerome, Pocatello, and Idaho Falls. Each district has a different captain and command staff, are managed separately and are overseen by a major. Each district has two divisions; patrol and investigations.

=== Patrol ===
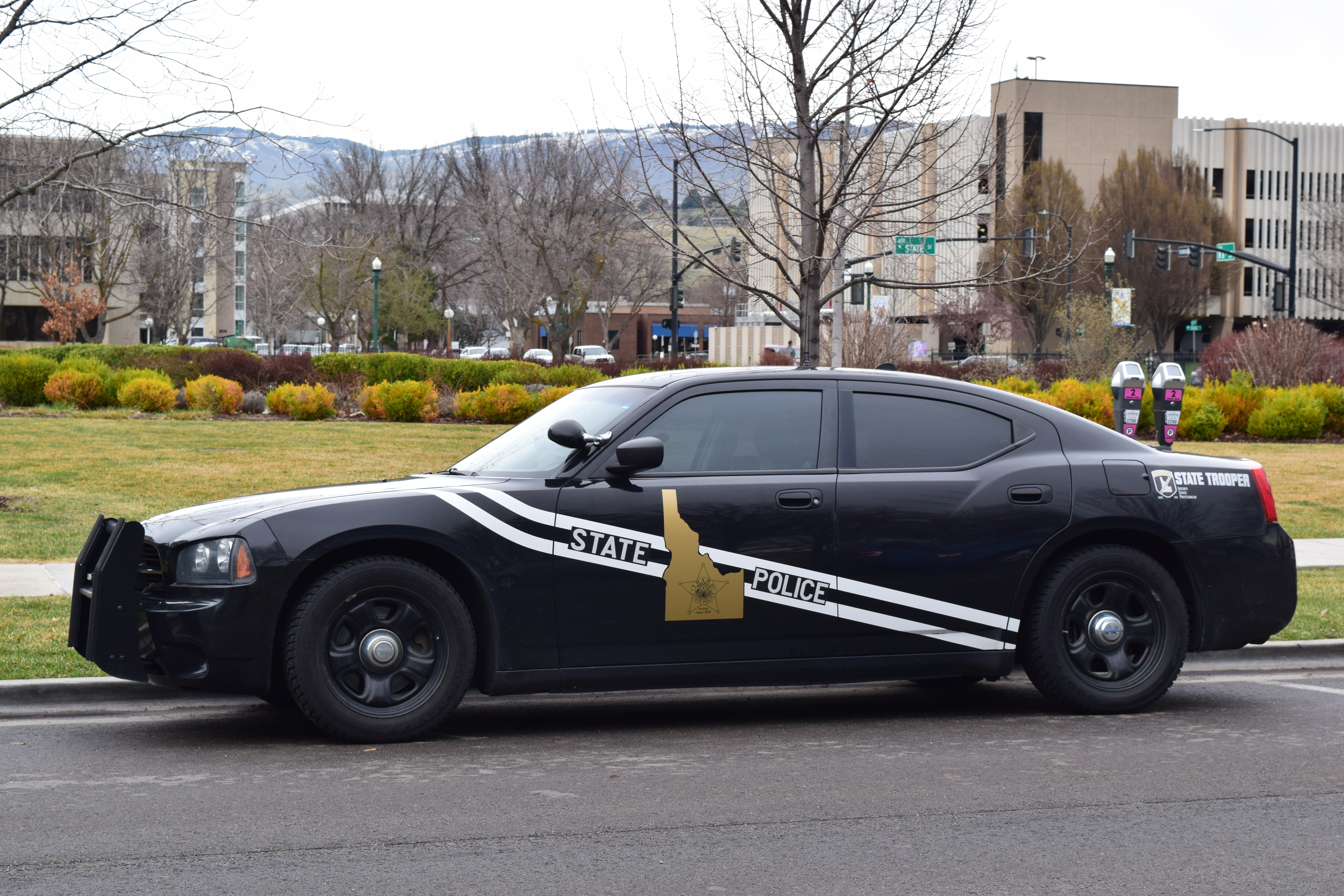
ISP patrol car at the Idaho State Capitol

The patrol division consists of uniformed state troopers who enforce the laws of Idaho. Commonly, a trooper will spend their time enforcing motor vehicle laws while on duty, primarily on state and federal highways.

=== Investigation ===
The investigation division consists of plainclothes detectives who enforce the laws of Idaho. The Idaho State Police detectives investigate major crimes such as homicide and large scale drug-related offenses.

=== Other divisions ===
- The Alcohol Beverage Control division ensures all establishments which sell or produce alcohol are properly licensed and conform to the law. The Idaho State Liquor Dispensary maintains a monopoly on the sale of all alcoholic beverages that exceed 16% alcohol by volume. The ABC enforces Title 23 - Alcoholic Beverages IDAPA 11 Title 05 Chapter 01.
- Commercial Vehicle Specialists are specially trained uniformed officers who enforce federal and state laws pertaining to the safety of commercial trucking.
- The Cyber Crimes Unit specializes in crimes involving computers and the internet.
- The Bureau of Criminal Identification maintains the state's fingerprint database.
- Forensic Services investigates controlled substances, crime scenes, firearms, forensic biology, impression evidence, toxicology, and trace evidence.
- Racing Commission provides oversight for horse racing activities within Idaho.
- Brands Board conducts livestock brand inspection, required for ownership changes, leaving Idaho and slaughter.

== Other duties ==
The Idaho State Police has two regional communications centers staffed with dispatchers who provide support to officers in the field.

The Idaho State Police is tasked with the physical protection of the governor of the state as well as other dignitaries who may need protection.

== Rank structure ==
Title	Insignia
Colonel	
Lieutenant Colonel	
Major	
Captain	
Lieutenant	
Sergeant	
Trooper	No insignia

== See also ==
- List of law enforcement agencies in Idaho
- State police
- State patrol
- Highway patrol
