= Leavenworth Detention Center =

Federal prison in Leavenworth, Kansas, US

Leavenworth Detention Facility
- Interactive map of Leavenworth Detention Facility
- Location: Leavenworth, Kansas, US; 39.2725°N 94.8923°W
- Status: Active
- Security class: Maximum
- Capacity: 1033
- Population: 477 (July 2026)
- Opened: May 1992
- Closed: late 2021; reopened March 2026
- Managed by: CoreCivic

The Leavenworth Detention Center was a privately run maximum-security federal prison located in Leavenworth, Kansas. The facility is owned and was operated by CoreCivic formerly named Corrections Corporation of America under contract with the United States Marshals Service.

The detention center reopened in March 2026 under the new name of Midwest Regional Reception Center, still operated by CoreCivic. In its reopened incarnation, the facility can hold up to 1,033 detained immigrants, and has a staff of 300. On March 19, 2026, the facility was holding 20 detainees; by May, the population rose to 249.

== History ==
When originally constructed as a 460-bed private prison, it was the first correctional facility under direct contract with a U.S. federal agency. In May 2008 the facility underwent its fourth expansion to increase capacity to 1,126 inmates. It held both male and female prisoners.

A 2017 U.S. Department of Justice (DOJ) Office of the Inspector General's report found understaffing and lack of oversight that lead to “issues affecting the safety and security” of the facility.

In January 2021, U.S. President Joe Biden issued Executive Order 14006, which prevented federal agencies from renewing contracts with privately run prisons.

In September 2021, American Civil Liberties Union (ACLU) affiliates and federal public defender offices in Kansas, Missouri, Iowa, and Nebraska sent a joint letter to the White House Domestic Policy Counsel to immediately close the Core Civic Detention Facility in Leavenworth, detailing the numerous reports each office had received about the Leavenworth facility from current and former staff and from residents and their families. CoreCivic's severe understaffing and profit-driven shortcuts ensured that stabbings, suicides, and homicides occurred with alarming frequency. Weapons, drugs, and other contraband were a common occurrence. In addition to all of the violence, CoreCivic neglected basic human needs in its Leavenworth Facility, restricting food, curtailing or cutting off contact with legal counsel and family, limiting medical care and even basic necessities like showers.

The facility's contract was allowed to expire on schedule in December 2021 without renewal. The facility has remained inactive.

In 2024, records produced in a Freedom of Information Act (FOIA) lawsuit filed by the ACLU against Immigration and Customs Enforcement responded to a request for proposal from ICE revealed that the Leavenworth facility, or Midwest Regional Reception Center, was among the CoreCivic facilities submitted for consideration of a contract.

In February 2025, CoreCivic submitted an application to the City of Leavenworth for a special use permit as required by city ordinance, an explicit statement of its purpose of opening the facility for ICE detentions, and followed up by hosting a private event listed as "an informational luncheon" with “a small number of leaders from the city, county and state level as well as multiple tours of the facility describing their intentions for the space as an ICE detention center. The proposal received opposition from the ACLU of Kansas, Advocates for Immigrants Rights and Reconciliation, former employees, and local residents Weeks later in mid-March, CoreCivic withdrew its application for the permit. The city then filed suit over CoreCivic's plan to reopen the facility without going through a permitting process. In March a judge issued a temporary restraining order against CoreCivic opening the facility without a permit from the city.

The dispute with city government continued until March 10, 2026, when the Leavenworth City Council approved permission for the prison to operate. Under terms of an agreement with the city, CoreCivic will pay an immediate $1.5 million fee, followed by $400,000 annually to support additional policing and administrative costs. The approval came despite protests and years of protest campaigns against the facility. Detainees began arriving less than two weeks later, with 20 held at the facility on March 19 and 249 by mid-May. Following its reopening, detainees have reported issues with medical neglect, inadequate food, prolonged lockdowns, inability to communicate with legal teams, and staff shortages. In August 2026, CoreCivic sold the facility to the Department of Homeland Security for $238.4 million.

== Other area facilities ==
The Leavenworth Detention Center was one of five state, federal and military prisons in the Leavenworth / Lansing area. The other four are:

- Lansing Correctional Facility, operated by the Kansas Department of Corrections
- United States Penitentiary, Leavenworth (USP) and its satellite prison camp, operated by the Federal Bureau of Prisons
- United States Disciplinary Barracks, the U.S. military's only maximum-security facility
- Midwest Joint Regional Correctional Facility, another U.S. military facility
