= Idaho State Correctional Center =

Prison in Idaho, United States

- Location in Idaho
- Location: Kuna, Idaho; 43°28′21″N 116°14′12″W
- Security class: Mixed security levels: minimum, medium, and close.
- Capacity: 2128
- Opened: July 2000
- Managed by: Idaho Department of Correction
- Director: Bree Derrick
- Warden: Alicia Carver

Idaho State Correctional Center (ISCC) is a state prison for men located in Kuna, Ada County, Idaho, one of a cluster of seven detention facilities known as the "South Boise Prison Complex". The other prisons in the area are the Correctional Alternative Placement Program, the Idaho State Correctional Institution, the Idaho Maximum Security Institution, the South Boise Women's Correctional Center, the South Idaho Correctional Institution, and the South Idaho Correctional Institution-Community Work Center.

The ISCC opened in July 2000 as the first privately run prison in Idaho, operated by the Corrections Corporation of America. With a capacity of 2,080 inmates, it is also the largest prison in the state, housing maximum, medium, and minimum custody male offenders.

In January 2014, citing a long history of issues, including violence and allegations of understaffing and contract fraud, Governor Butch Otter announced that the state would assume command of the facility when the contract expired in June of that year. Governor Otter himself had been a proponent of privatization.

In 2014, the Federal Bureau of Investigation began an investigation of the CCA management of the prison. The American Civil Liberties Union, which sued on behalf of inmates in 2010, claimed that understaffing resulted in high levels of violence at the facility, which prompted some inmates to refer to it as a "gladiator school."

The ISCC maintains an active branch of the American Legion.
