= Idaho Department of Juvenile Corrections =

American state agency

Coordinates: 43°37′09″N 116°12′11″W

Agency overview
- Formed: 1995
- Jurisdiction: Government of Idaho
- Headquarters: 954 W Jefferson St, Boise, ID 83702
- Agency executive: Monty Prow, Director

The Idaho Department of Juvenile Corrections (IDJC) is a state agency of Idaho that operates three juvenile correction centers and works closely with county probation departments to provide accountability, community protection, and rehabilitation to justice involved juveniles in Idaho. The three facilities are: Juvenile Corrections Center Lewiston (JCC-L), Juvenile Corrections Center Nampa (JCC-N), and Juvenile Corrections Center St. Anthony (JCC-SA). The agency has its headquarters in Boise.

== Facilities ==
=== Juvenile Corrections Center St. Anthony ===
Juvenile Corrections Center Saint Anthony is located in the town of St. Anthony, Idaho. It is the largest state-run juvenile correctional facility in the state of Idaho. The facility sits on about 20 acres one mile west of the city of St. Anthony. It is a large campus like facility that currently houses a maximum of 120 juveniles in a treatment environment plus ten beds utilized for regional observation and assessment and special management. There are six different residential cottages and 15 other buildings that include several educational buildings, a large food service area, gymnasium, administration building, laundry, and a chapel.

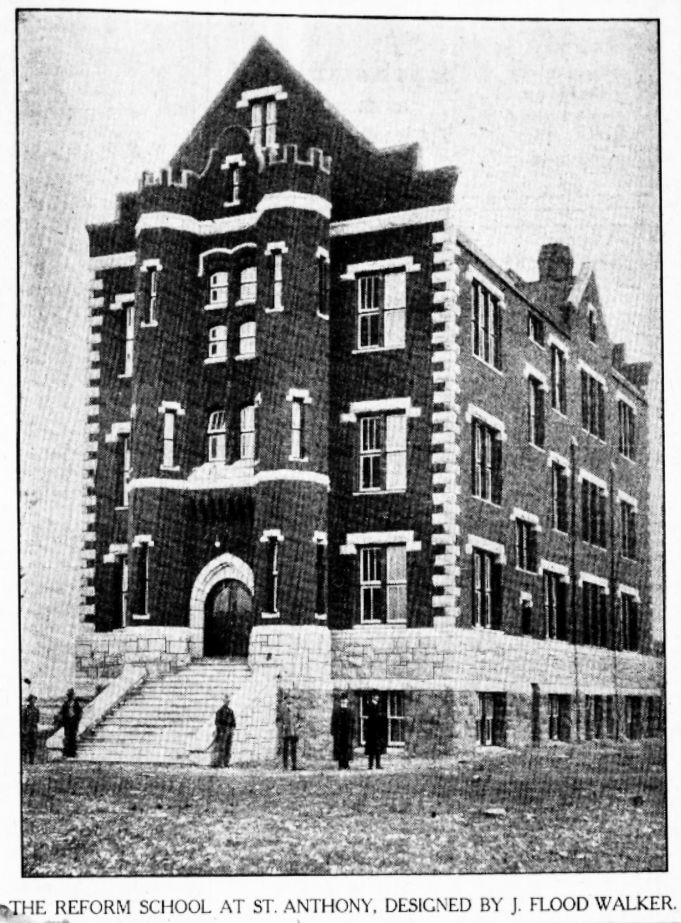
The Idaho Juvenile Corrections Center in St. Anthony, Idaho in 1905

There are many areas dedicated to outdoor recreation such as a large soccer area, softball diamond, outdoor basketball court, and a state-of-the art challenge course, with high and low elements. JCC–St. Anthony provides a highly structured, staff-secure program using a positive peer culture model for the custody and treatment of male and female offenders who have a history of various crimes, and have failed in less secure community-based programs and facilities. The JCC–St. Anthony program focuses juveniles on victim and community restoration related to their crimes. The program also offers cognitive skills building to alter their criminal patterns of thought and requires the juveniles to be accountable daily for their behavior and progress through the program. Employees at JCC–St. Anthony are dedicated to helping each of the juveniles that come to the facility. There are many employees who have been employed at the facility for 10 to 25 years, and their experience working with juveniles is invaluable. Staff and juveniles continually work together to create a safe and secure environment that is conducive to making the changes necessary for juveniles to be able to return to their communities with the skills and values that will give them the opportunity to be successful citizens.

=== Juvenile Corrections Center Nampa ===
==== C.H.O.I.C.E.S. ====
The Juvenile Corrections Center Nampa is located in the city of Nampa, Idaho. It is Idaho's the second largest juvenile corrections facility.

C.H.O.I.C.E.S. (an acronym which stands for Creating, Honest, Open, Individuals, Choosing, Enduring, Solutions) is a program that uses the Balanced Approach and Restorative Justice Model as its primary foundation. The Choices program provides individualized rehabilitative treatment specifically designed to treat juvenile offenders between 14 and 21 years of age who have serious drug and alcohol, sexual offending behaviors as well as other behavioral problems. Exceptions to the age range can be made on a case-by-case basis. The treatment program follows a philosophy that believes effective treatment for juvenile offenders with substance abuse and behavioral disorders involves a holistic approach. This approach includes attention to emotional growth, family relations, academic success, social supports, and cultural diversity along with physical and psychological healing. Credentialed addiction counselors work with other professionals to provide a safe, balanced and flexible treatment environment.

==== Therapeutic Community ====
The Therapeutic Community is the structure utilized in the Choices program. Therapeutic communities produce an environment that is immediately safe and functional, as well as challenging and supportive of meaningful life changes, and sustained sobriety. The T.C. structure generalizes to successful living in society. The Choices program T.C. emphasizes education as a means to rehabilitate juvenile offenders across all disciplines. Highly qualified clinical, educational, medical, and rehabilitation staff all are committed to facilitating the juvenile offender's successful completion of the rehabilitation program and reintegration into the home community. As a team, staff members educate juvenile offenders through direct instruction, role modeling, group processing, individual therapy and group activities that facilitate and provide real opportunities for juvenile offenders to practice and generalize pro-social skills.

==== Solutions program ====
Solutions is a program that is tailored to meet the mental health and substance abuse needs for juveniles. Solutions is a 24-bed program with a 12-bed unit for females and a 12-bed unit for males. Solutions is a therapeutic community that promotes individual change and positive growth. This is accomplished through creating a community of positive peers working together to help themselves and each other. Juveniles learn to become members of the Solutions community and play a role in managing the community and act as positive role models for others. Solutions offers residential dialectical behavior therapy (DBT). DBT is a form of behavioral therapy that teaches juveniles the skills necessary to regulate emotions, avoid self-destructive behaviors, cope with difficult life situations, and improve interpersonal skills.

==== Observation and Assessment Unit ====
The Observation and Assessment Unit is the location that the juvenile is transported to upon commitment (IDJC Region 2 utilize JCC-N and Region 3 utilizes JCC-SA) are first placed in the Observation & Assessment Unit (O&A) to go through a process of being tested, behaviors observed, and placement plan determined. Rehabilitation staff members are committed to stabilizing and preparing juveniles for treatment program participation. Average length of stay in the Observation & Assessment Unit is 30 days.

After being at O&A for about one month, juveniles are given the ICLA or the Initial Custody Level Assessment. Depending on the ICLA level (Level 1–5, 5 being the highest risk to the community) of the juvenile and the needs of the juvenile (as determined by program and clinical staff), the juveniles are then sent to a program where the juvenile has the best chance to succeed.

=== Juvenile Corrections Center Lewiston ===
Juvenile Corrections Center Lewiston is located in the city of Lewiston, Idaho. It is Idaho's the smallest juvenile corrections facility.

==== Milestones program ====
The objective of the Milestones program is to facilitate a transformation in the juvenile offender's behavior from delinquent and addictive to pro-social and healthy. The program staff and treatment team develop individual and community strategies to help eliminate and / or manage undesirable behaviors and reinforce those that are socially acceptable with positive outcomes. The JCC–L program model incorporates mentoring, cognitive restructuring, social learning, and cause and effect reinforcement. JCC-L recognizes that most juvenile offenders, including those who are lower functioning, still possess a level of reasoning, response, and the ability to identify simple patterns. These juvenile offenders also possess the necessary tools to facilitate self-change. Consistent with cognitive theory, the expressed thoughts and beliefs of the juvenile offenders are tracked over time to establish patterns of thinking. Cognitive interventions target both beliefs and thoughts, identify those with positive and negative ultimate outcomes, and subsequently facilitate a change in behavior. In addition to providing alternative coping skills and competencies, the Milestone program also reduces risk levels. Any idea, belief, or circumstance which causes a juvenile to gravitate to inappropriate / illegal behavior is a risk factor.
