= Alamogordo (disambiguation) =

Alamogordo is the seat of Otero County, New Mexico, United States.

Alamogordo may also refer to:

== Education ==
- Alamogordo High School, a high school in Otero County, New Mexico
- Alamogordo Public Schools, the school system for an area of Otero County
- New Mexico State University Alamogordo, a 2-year community college

== Military ==
- Alamogordo Air Force Base, the name of Holloman Air Force Base before 1948
- Alamogordo Army Air Field, or Holloman Air Force Base, home of the 49th Wing of the Air Combat Command
- Alamogordo Guided Missile Test Base, part of the White Sands Missile Range in Southern New Mexico

== Other ==
- Alamogordo Daily News, founded in 1898
- Alamogordo, NM Micropolitan Statistical Area, geographically the same as Otero County, New Mexico
- Alamogordo, NM μSA, a micropolitan area that is geographically the same as Otero County, New Mexico
- Alamogordo–White Sands Regional Airport, a city-owned public-use airport, located 5 mi (8.0 km) from Alamogordo

== See also ==
- USS Alamogordo (ARDM-2)
