= High Rolls Mountain Park, New Mexico =

High Rolls Mountain Park is the designated name for a post office in New Mexico. The post office's name refers to the following communities:

- High Rolls, New Mexico
- Mountain Park, New Mexico
