= New Mexico State Road 506 =

State highway in New Mexico, United States

State Road 506

Route information
- Maintained by NMDOT
- Length: 31.9 mi (51.3 km)

Major junctions
- West end: US 54 near Orogrande
- East end: End of state maintenance at Fort Bliss Military Reservation

Location
- Country: United States
- State: New Mexico
- Counties: Otero

Highway system
- New Mexico State Highway System; Interstate; US; State; Scenic
← NM 505	→ NM 507

State Road 506 (NM 506) is a 31.9-mile-long (51.3 km) state highway in the US state of New Mexico. NM 506's western terminus is at U.S. Route 54 (US 54) north of Orogrande, and the eastern terminus is at the state line with Texas, by Dell City, Texas.

== Major intersections ==
The entire route is in Otero County.

Location	mi	km	Destinations	Notes
	0.000	0.000	US 54	Western terminus
Ancho	31.900	51.338	End of state maintenance at Fort Bliss Military Reservation, unmaintained portion extends to the state line by Dell City, Texas	Eastern terminus
1.000 mi = 1.609 km; 1.000 km = 0.621 mi
