= Dirty Drawers Canyon =

Valley in New Mexico, USA

- Location within New Mexico

Geography
- Location: Otero County, New Mexico U.S.
- Coordinates: 32°51′30″N 105°46′54″W

Location
- Interactive map of Dirty Drawers Canyon

Dirty Drawers Canyon [elevation: 9,035 feet (2,754 m)] is a valley in Otero County, New Mexico, in the United States.

According to local history, Dirty Drawers Canyon was named for a woman whose personal hygiene was in question, like her reputation.
