= Piñon, New Mexico =

Unincorporated community in New Mexico, United States

Piñon
- Unincorporated community & Census-designated places
- Location within the state of New Mexico Piñon (the United States)
- Coordinates: 32°37′05″N 105°23′12″W
- Country: United States
- State: New Mexico
- County: Otero

Area
  - Total: 5.17 sq mi (13.38 km^{2})
  - Land: 5.16 sq mi (13.37 km^{2})
  - Water: 0.0039 sq mi (0.01 km^{2})
- Elevation: 6,011 ft (1,832 m)

Population (2020)
  - Total: 24
  - Density: 4.7/sq mi (1.8/km^{2})
- Time zone: UTC-7 (Mountain (MST))
  - Summer (DST): UTC-6 (MDT)
- ZIP codes: 88344
- Area code: 575
- FIPS code: 35-57440
- GNIS feature ID: 2584178

Piñon is an unincorporated ranching community in Otero County in southern New Mexico, in the southwestern United States. It is in the pinyon-juniper woodland habitat with an altitude of 6,060 feet and is located at the intersection of NM Route 24 and NM Route 506.

The area is arid and subject to forest fires. In June 2011, the lightning-caused Gage Fire burned 1385 acres just to the west of town.

== History ==
The area was originally settled by the agricultural and hunter gatherer Jornada Mogollon people, circa 200 CE, whose suzerainty ended with the influx of the Apache and other plains raiders in approximately 1450.

The community was named in 1907 by the local school teacher John W. Nations after the piñon pine trees in the area. The postoffice in Piñon opened in 1907. In 2014, Piñon was ranked as the most politically conservative town in New Mexico.

== Economy ==
The last gas station in Piñon closed in 2004.

== Demographics ==
Historical population
Census	Pop.	Note	%±
2020	24		—
U.S. Decennial Census

== Education ==
It is within Cloudcroft Municipal Schools.

In 1958 the Piñon area joined the Alamogordo Public Schools school district instead of the Cloudcroft district. The Cloudcroft school board disliked the decision and in 1958 passed a motion stating that the district should not accept Pinon or Weed students even if their respective areas offered to pay tuition to Cloudcroft schools. At the time area students went to elementary school in Piñon and high school in Weed. In 1959 the Alamogordo board decided to have a school in Piñon closed. In August 1959, Piñon residents filed an injunction against board members to stop the closure. The board upheld the closure in December 1959.

In November 1992 the Cloudcroft district's board passed a resolution to annex portions of the Alamogordo district, including Piñon. In a separate motion the district drew new electoral boundaries with the annexed area effective the approval of said annexation. By then the Alamogordo district had closed both schools in Weed and sent students to Cloudcroft schools.
