= Timberon, New Mexico =

- CDP
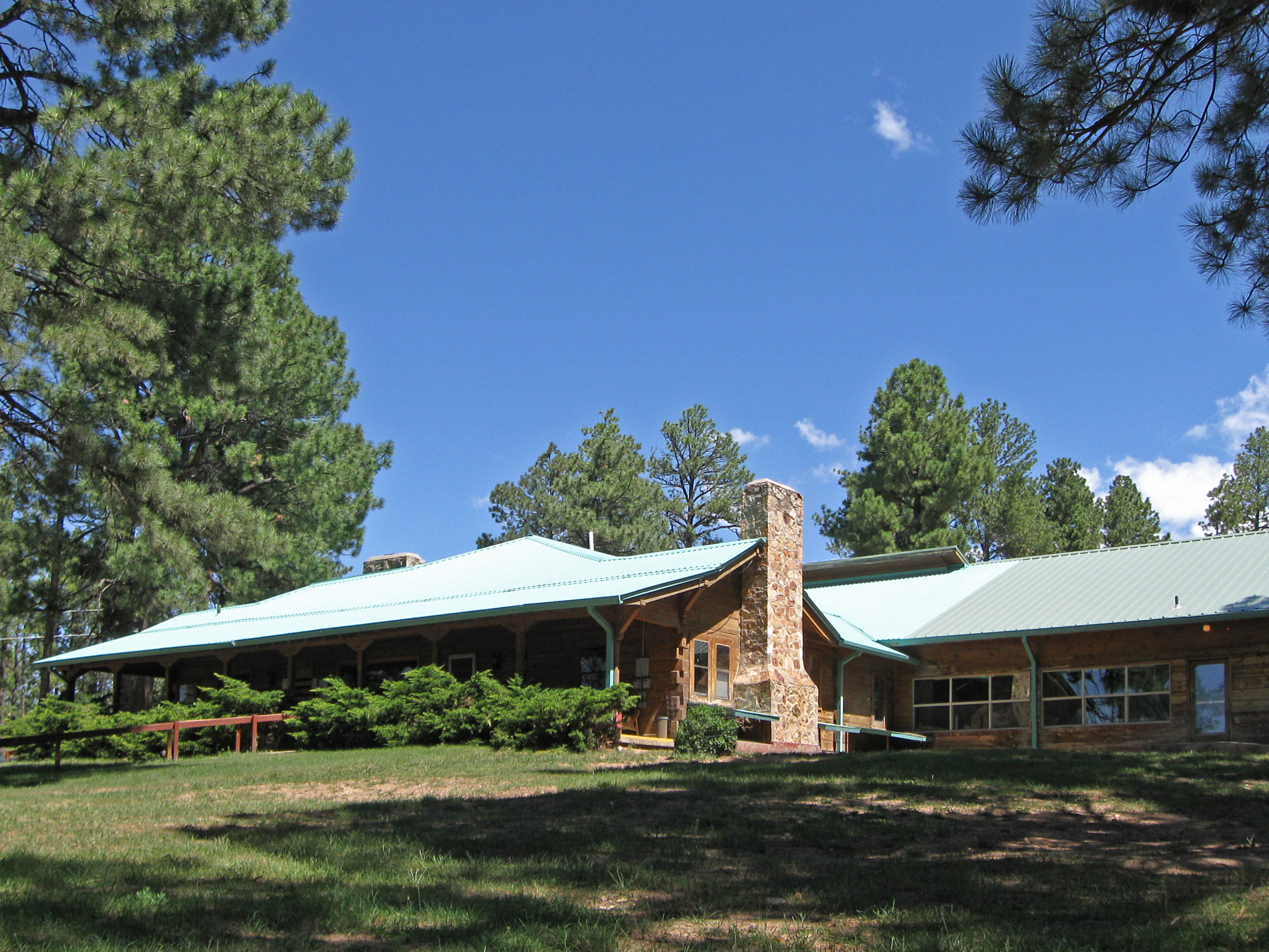
- Timberon Lodge

- Location of Timberon, New Mexico

- Location in the United States
- Coordinates: 32°37′54″N 105°41′32″W
- Country: United States
- State: New Mexico
- County: Otero

Area
  - Total: 20.31 sq mi (52.61 km^{2})
  - Land: 20.29 sq mi (52.55 km^{2})
  - Water: 0.023 sq mi (0.06 km^{2})
- Elevation: 6,975 ft (2,126 m)

Population (2020)
  - Total: 345
  - Density: 17.0/sq mi (6.57/km^{2})
- Time zone: UTC-7 (Mountain (MST))
  - Summer (DST): UTC-6 (MDT)
- ZIP code: 88350
- Area code: 575
- FIPS code: 35-77950
- GNIS feature ID: 2409323

Timberon is a census-designated place (CDP) in Otero County, New Mexico, United States, and is within the Sacramento Mountains at the southern edge of the Lincoln National Forest. The population was 345 at the 2020 census.

Timberon has a nine-hole golf course, as well as a lodge, a pool, a church, an airstrip and a volunteer fire department. The residents consider it a retirement and resort community. Children are bussed into Cloudcroft for public school.

== Geography ==
Timberon is located in a forested valley, known as Sacramento Canyon, on the southern slopes of the Sacramento Mountains. The Sacramento Creek, an intermittent creek, flows southeast through the valley. The community extends up several crosscutting canyons including Arkansas Canyon, Graveyard Canyon and Carrisa Canyon. The elevation in Timberon varies from 6,900 to 7,200 feet. Jefferies Peak at 8,501 feet (2,591 m) is located directly to the east of the valley, and Culp Peak at 7,280 feet (2,219 m) lies to the west.

According to the United States Census Bureau, the CDP has a total area of 20.2 square miles (52 km^{2}), all land.

== History ==
The land that now constitutes the community of Timberon was purchased from the State of New Mexico in 1933 by Judge Paul Moss. Moss had a hunting lodge there and cut some timber. In the 1960s the land was owned by Willie Farah, of El Paso, Texas who built an airstrip there. Development of the community really began when the property was sold to the North American Land Development Corporation in March 1969. The volunteer fire department was begun in 1974, the firehouse was completed in 1981 and the post office opened that same year. In 1976 a missile from White Sands Missile Range went awry and landed in the middle of the community. The road into Timberon was paved in 2005.

In July 2016 a fire destroyed almost eighty structures, including forty-four homes in Timberon.

== Demographics ==
Historical population
Census	Pop.	Note	%±
2020	345		—
U.S. Decennial Census

As of the census of 2000, there were 309 people, 145 households, and 98 families residing in the CDP. The population density was 15.3 people per square mile (5.9/km^{2}). There were 458 housing units at an average density of 22.7 per square mile (8.7/km^{2}). The racial makeup of the CDP was 91.59% White, 0.32% Native American, 0.32% Asian, 4.21% from other races, and 3.56% from two or more races. Hispanic or Latino of any race were 12.62% of the population.

There were 145 households, out of which 14.5% had children under the age of 18 living with them, 63.4% were married couples living together, 2.1% had a female householder with no husband present, and 32.4% were non-families. One person households made up 29.7% of all households with 14.5% of all households being someone living alone who was over 65 years of age. The average household size was 2.13 and the average family size was 2.52.

In the CDP, the population was spread out, with 16.2% under the age of 18, 3.6% from 18 to 24, 15.2% from 25 to 44, 36.6% from 45 to 64, and 28.5% who were 65 years of age or older. The median age was 54 years. For every 100 females, there were 114.6 males. For every 100 females age 18 and over, there were 100.8 males.

The median income for a household in the CDP was $24,519, and the median income for a family was $25,804. Males had a median income of $13,000 versus $25,278 for females. The per capita income for the CDP was $11,743. About 2.9% of families and 9.5% of the population were below the poverty line, including none of those under the age of eighteen and 4.9% of those 65 or over.

== Education ==
It is within Cloudcroft Municipal Schools.

In the 1970s children were bussed to the elementary school in Weed, New Mexico, but because of the difficulties of winter travel, an elementary school was established in December 1980 that operated just during the three winter months. The school building, known as the Little Red School House, offered Kindergarten through Sixth Grade instruction under the Alamogordo School District. By 1992 it became a year-round school. The projected enrollment for the 1992-1993 school year was around 9, but because multiple Weed parents decided to send their children to Timberon instead, the actual enrolled student count that year was 18. Weed Elementary School closed in August 1992 as the enrollment count was zero despite a projected enrollment of 18.

In November 1992 the Cloudcroft district's board passed a resolution to annex portions of the Alamogordo district, including Timberon. In a separate motion the district drew new electoral boundaries with the annexed area effective the approval of said annexation.

The Little Red Schoolhouse continued under the administration of the Cloudcroft School District until May 2002, after which students were bussed to Cloudcroft.

== See also ==
- Lincoln National Forest
