= Alamogordo Public Library =

Public library in Alamogordo, New Mexico, US

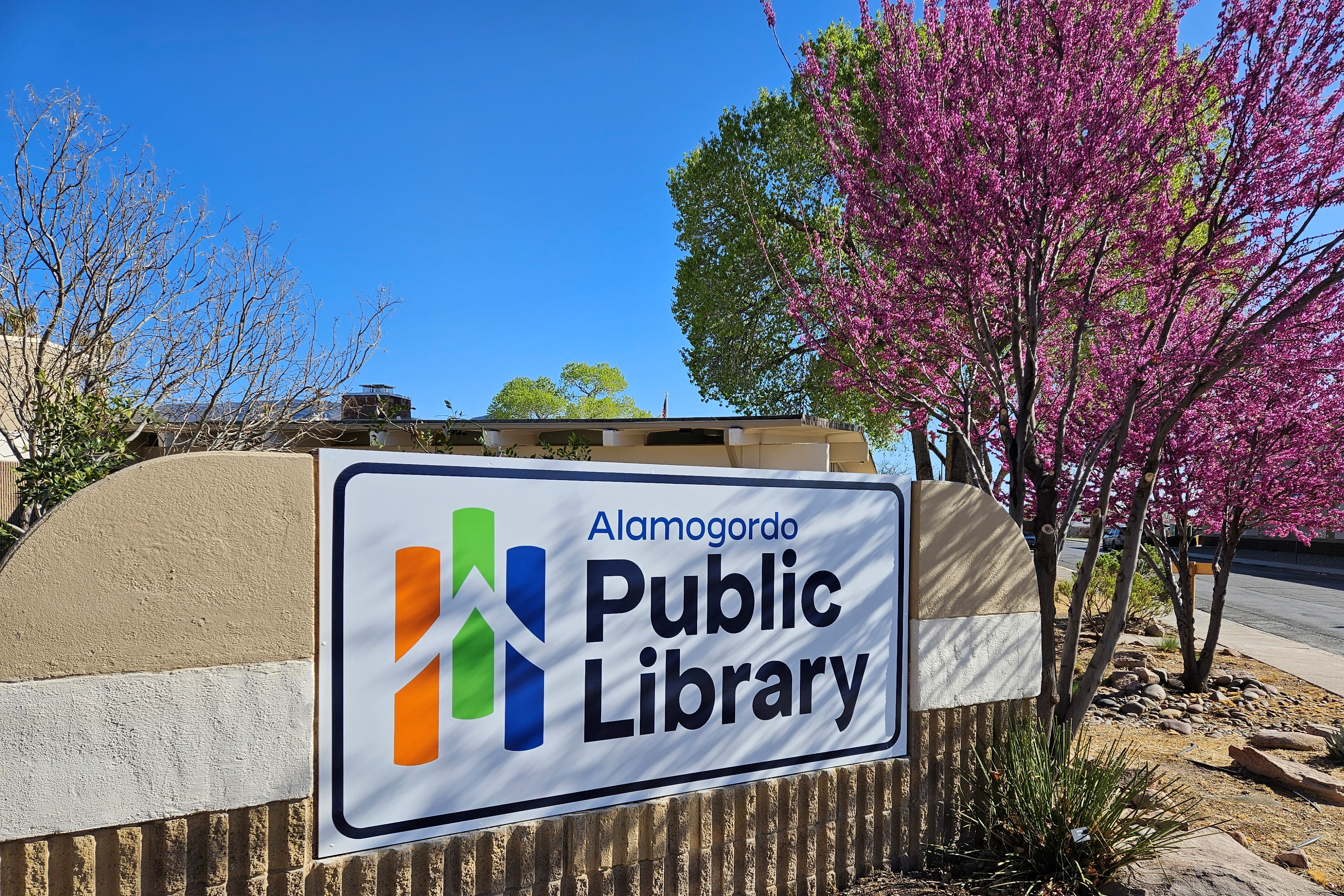
- 32°53′56.59″N 105°56′40.33″W
- Location: 920 Oregon Avenue, Alamogordo, New Mexico 88310
- Established: 1900

Collection
- Size: 75,094 (2024)

Access and use
- Circulation: 134,828 (2024)
- Population served: 31,667 (2024)
- Members: 16,654 (2024)

Other information
- Budget: $1,082,729<https://nmstatelibrary.org/services-for-new-mexico-libraries/statistical-reports/ref name="Budget 2024" />
- Director: Kim Underwood
- Employees: 11 FTE
- Website: www.ci.alamogordo.nm.us/815/Alamogordo-Public-Library

The Alamogordo Public Library is the public library serving Alamogordo, New Mexico and Otero County, New Mexico. The library has extensive collections of Spanish-language and German-language books and of materials related to the Western writer Eugene Manlove Rhodes.

== History ==
The Alamogordo Public Library first opened on March 1, 1900. Alamogordo was unusual for a Southwestern town at the time in that it was a planned community, the planning being carried out by Charles Bishop Eddy's and John Arthur Eddy's Alamogordo Improvement Company. The Eddy brothers saw a library as being necessary for their community and they gave financial support to the Alamogordo Woman's Club to start the library. Ownership passed to an offshoot, the Alamogordo Library Association, and then to the Civic League. The Civic League retained ownership of the library until 1958 when it was sold for one dollar to the City of Alamogordo.

The library had resided in a series of rented rooms until 1962 when a library building was constructed at 920 Oregon Avenue. The building was 10,280 square feet (955 m^{2}) and cost $175,000. John Reed of Albuquerque was the architect. The library building was doubled in size in 1987 to 20,764 square feet (1,929.0 m^{2}) at a cost of $871,042. The architect was again John Reed.

In 2001 a block of land next to the current library was donated to the city to be the site of a new library building, planned at 40,000 square feet (3,700 m^{2}). Bond elections in 2005 and 2009 to fund construction of the new building failed.

Alamogordo Public Library is a city-owned library, but library cards are free to all residents of Otero County. (County government pays a yearly subsidy to the city for this service; in FY 2023/2024 the subsidy was $50,000.) The Alamogordo Public Library offers a variety of library cards, including regular cards with material checkout and digital collections access, digital access only cards, internet use only cards, and nonresident cards.

The Alamogordo Public Library installed a system for automating collection and catalog records in 1995,^{: 20} and the catalog became available over the Internet in 2004. The library catalog is run by Syndetics Unbound™. Syndetics Unbound™ is a powerful service for digital reader's advisory assistance with interactive exploration and serendipitous discovery tool. Options like “Summary” and “Author Bios” provide in-depth details on the collection's titles. “Reading Level” and “Book Profiles” also give further insight into the context of titles to assist in selection, and elements such as “You May Also Like,” “Look Inside,” “Reviews,” “Related,” and “More Information” aid in book selection.

Collections

The Alamogordo Public Library has 16,400,395 items available to patrons in its collections, including audiobooks, books in print, compact disks, digital audiobooks, digital books, digital and DVD movies, digital and CD music, as well as digital and print magazines and newspapers.

24 Hour Library (Digital Collection)

The Alamogordo Public Library's digital collection, the 24 Hour Library, offers more than 16,000,000 resources available to patrons at any time. The digital repository includes:

Acceda Noticias (NewsBank) Acceda Noticias provides convenient access to the complete electronic editions of more than 90 Spanish-language sources published in major U.S. cities. It contains tens of thousands of current and archived full-text articles from around the world.

Access Military, Government & Defense (NewsBank) Access Military, Government & Defense features current and archived full-text content from key military publications.

America's News (NewsBank) Current and archived articles from local, regional, and national sources. Includes access to more than 2,000 newspapers.

Black Freedom Struggle The Black Freedom Struggle website includes more than 2,000 documents curated around six crucial phases of the U.S. Black freedom struggle: Resistance to slavery by enslaved persons and the abolitionist movement of the 19th century; the end of slavery during the Civil War and the Reconstruction Era; the fight against Jim Crow segregation; the New Deal and World War II; the Civil Rights Movement and Black Power Movement from 1946 to 1975; and the contemporary Black experience since 1976.

Blackstone Unlimited Blackstone Unlimited is a groundbreaking platform that revolutionizes access to audiobooks for libraries with the largest always-available collection of downloadable audiobooks.

BlueCareer BlueCareer offers detailed information on over 150 skilled trades, links people with hundreds of career schools and vocational programs throughout the United States and Canada, and offers training for those who want to expand their knowledge and expertise in the Skilled Trades.

Comics Plus®, Comics Plus offers readers unlimited access to thousands of digital comics, manga, and picture books from popular publishers.

El Portal The New Mexico State Library offers free access for all New Mexico residents to a collection of databases available online 24/7. The collection includes newspapers, magazines, journal articles, and books such as encyclopedias. El Portal also features auto repair manuals via ChiltonLibrary.com and HelpNow and JobNow resources from Brain Fuse. Digital materials are available for all age ranges and interests.

Fiero Code Fiero Code, a learn-to-code software, teaches users computer programming skills through a series of tutorials and projects.

Freegal Music+ Freegal Music+ offers access to about 16 million songs, including Sony Music's catalog of legendary artists.

GetSetUp GetSetUp and the New Mexico State Library are partnering to help older adults age well by providing programming, experiences, and connections. These free online classes will help users gain confidence with technology, learn new skills with senior specific class content, and share interests with like-minded peers.

Heritage Quest Online Heritage Quest Online is a comprehensive resource for genealogical research.

Hispanic Life in America (NewsBank) Hispanic Life in America provides comprehensive coverage of the Hispanic American experience from the early 18th century to present day.

Kanopy Kanopy is a video streaming service for movies, documentaries, foreign films, classic cinema, independent films, educational videos and children's programming.

Mango Languages® - Learn a foreign language on-line, at home, or in the car. Mango has over 70 foreign languages, English as a Second Language programs in 15 languages, and American Sign Language (ASL.)

New Mexico State News Source (NewsBank) - Research diverse perspectives, topics and trends that align with curricular areas such as Political Science, English, Sociology, Humanities, Business, International Studies and more. Features reliable, credible information from a wide variety of local and regional news sources. Also available remotely 24/7 on any device.

OverDrive (Libby app) - Download and enjoy eBooks and Digital Audio Books on your computer, smart phone, tablet, or eBook reader. Download the Libby app .

In-House Collections

Audiobooks The Alamogordo Public Library has two in-house collections of audiobooks. The collections contain more than 1,500 audiobooks on CD and 300 audiobooks on Playaway.

Braille The Alamogordo Public Library houses braille books for adults and children that are available for checkout.

Children's The Alamogordo Public Library's Children's collection contains more than 20,000 books, including board books, braille books, audio books on CD, biographies, fiction, graphic novels, nonfiction, oversized, reference, Spanish, and juvenile DVDs.

Closed Stacks The Alamogordo Public Library's Closed Stacks collection holds more than 600 items, the majority of which can only be viewed within the library and are not available for checkout.

Compact Discs The Alamogordo Public Library has more than 1,500 Compact Disks available for checkout in numerous genres, including: Bluegrass, Blues, Children's, Christian, Classical, Comedy, Country, Folk, Gospel, Hispanic, Holiday, Jazz, Karaoke, New Age, Pop, Punk, R&B, Rock, and Soundtracks.

DVDs The Alamogordo Public Library has more than 5,000 nonfiction, fiction, and foreign movies available on DVDs for checkout.

Fiction The Alamogordo Public Library houses more than 16,500 fiction books, including: Mystery, Large Type Fiction, Large Type Mystery, and Large Type Western.

Genealogy The Alamogordo Public Library's Genealogy collection contains more than 200 books and early records, including: early census records, gravesite records, New Mexico DAR lineage, and Otero County Pioneer Family records, as well as numerous genealogy instruction books available for checkout.

Graphic Novels The Alamogordo Public Library holds more than 2,000 Graphic Novels in multiple genres, including: biography, fantasy, history, horror, manga, and superhero.

Library of Things The Alamogordo Public Library has a Library of Things collection with a total of 139 items that include: interactive learning kits; board, carnival and outdoor games; character, novelty and specialty cake pans; as well as miscellaneous items such as kitchen equipment, household items, technology items, tools, toys, Wi-Fi hotspots, and so much more.

Local History The Alamogordo Public Library holds a Local History Collection of vertical files for both Alamogordo and Otero County.

Microfilm The Alamogordo Public Library has 19 newspapers in its Microfilm Collection. The newspapers within the collection include: Alamogordo News (1899 – 1913), Alamogordo Journal (1903 – 1905), Alamogordo News Advertiser (1912 – 1914), Alamogordo Cloudcrofter (1920 – 1922), Alamogordo Weekly News (1920 - 1954), Alamogordo Advertiser (1929 – 1951), Alamogordo Daily News (1954 – 2004), Cloudcroft Silver Lining (1904 – 1909), The New York Times (1961 – 1965), Orogrande Times 1906 – 1907), Otero County News (1914 – 1920), Otero County Times (1947 – 1953), Otero County Star (1961 – 1970), Sacramento Chief (1899), Southwestern Baptist (1901), Tularosa Democrat (1903 – 1904), Tularosa Reporter (1905), Tularosa Valley Tribune (1969 – 1972), and The Weekly Cloudcrofter (1913 – 1920).

New Mexico FamilyPass The Alamogordo Public Library offers New Mexico FamilyPass available for checkout. FamilyPass provides free admission (up to 6 people) to 15 state museums and historic sites.

FamilyPass may be used at the following locations:

- 7 New Mexico Historic Sites, Statewide
- New Mexico History Museum, Santa Fe
- New Mexico Museum of Art on the Plaza and New Mexico Museum of Art Vladem Contemporary in the Railyard, Santa Fe
- Museum of International Folk Art, Santa Fe
- Museum of Indian Arts & Culture, Santa Fe
- New Mexico Museum of Space History, Alamogordo
- New Mexico Museum of Natural History and Science, Albuquerque
- New Mexico Farm & Ranch Heritage Museum, Las Cruces
- National Hispanic Cultural Center, Albuquerque

New Mexico Law The Alamogordo Public Library holds a comprehensive collection of over 200 New Mexico Law books. The collection includes New Mexico Code of Ordinances, New Mexico Criminal and Traffic Law, New Mexico Digest, Laws of New Mexico, New Mexico Reports, New Mexico Rules of Court, and New Mexico Statutes Annotated.

Nonfiction The Alamogordo Public Library has over 14,000 Adult Nonfiction books available for checkout.

Oral History The Alamogordo Public Library has over 550 hours of recorded Oral History interviews regarding notable and notorious locals, farm and ranching life, early businesses and enterprises, major historical events, and civil and social changes. The Oral History collection is available in CD checkout, as well as audio play in the catalogue.

Periodicals The Alamogordo Public Library has a wide selection of available periodicals including: Alamogordo News, Albuquerque Journal, El Paso Times, USA Today, World Tribune, Mountain Monthly, El Palacio, El Periodico, Enchantment, New Mexico Historical Review, New Mexico, Think New Mexico, True West, American Spirit, Astronomy, The Atlantic, Better Homes and Gardens, Car and Driver, Consumer Reports, Dwell, Essence, Food Network Magazine, Harpers, Kiplinger, Liberty, Living Buddhism, Mother Earth News, Mother Jones, Motocross, The Nation, National Geographic, People, Poetry, Popular Mechanics, Psychology Today, Real Simple, Rolling Stone, Smithsonian, Soaring, Sports Illustrated, and Time Magazine.

Reference The Alamogordo Public Library has more than 1,000 Reference books available for in-house use only. Different types of reference materials available include atlases; dictionaries; encyclopedias; ancient, social, and world history; anatomy and medicine; legal statutes; and historical statistics.

Rhodes In 1958 the Civic League purchased W. H. Hutchinson's collection of Eugene Manlove Rhodes materials and donated them to the Alamogordo Public Library.^{: 8} The collection consists of books, correspondence, clippings, some magazines, and a few original manuscripts. These items, and some other Rhodes-related items collected by past Library Director June Harwell, have been photocopied, cataloged, and scanned into computer files and are available to researchers.

Southwest The Eugene Manlove Rhodes Room houses the Alamogordo Public Library's Southwest Collection. The shelves are filled with local history books and papers, biographies of New Mexico's finest and most notorious citizens, and hundreds of volumes of celebrated New Mexico fiction.

Young Adult The Alamogordo Public Library has more than 1,500 nonfiction and fiction books in its Young Adult collection.

Current Services

[edit]

Book Club The Alamogordo Public Library hosts a Book Club that meets the first Saturday of every month, excluding holiday weekends. The Book Club is group-directed; members decide what books/genres will be discussed month to month.

Children's Programing The Alamogordo Public Library provides numerous children's programs, including weekly programs like Story Time and Baby Lapsit, as well as monthly programs like Builder's Club.

Computer Education Classes The Alamogordo Public Library offers Computer Literacy Education Classes. Classes are by appointment only, and can be offered as a one-on-one class, or in a small group setting.

Computers and Technology The Alamogordo Public Library has 15 adult computers, 2 student computers, and 6 children's computers for library patrons and visitors. All computers provide Internet access and Microsoft Office programs; the children's computers have some educational programs. The library also offers free wireless Internet (WiFi) access, as well as copying, printing, and scanning services.

Curbside Service The Alamogordo Public Library offers curbside pickup service Fridays and Saturdays, 10:00 A.M. to 11:45 A.M.

Homebound A homebound delivery program at the Alamogordo Public Library offers free selection and delivery of books to patrons who find it difficult to come into the library. The program operates in cooperation with the Alamogordo Senior Center's Retired Senior and Volunteer Program.

Interlibrary Loan The Alamogordo Public Library offers Interlibrary loan services for patrons with an Alamogordo Public Library card in good standing. Through the Alamogordo Public Library's inter-library loan service, patrons can request printed materials to be borrowed from outside libraries.

Notary Public Services The Alamogordo Public Library offers free notary services to the public.

Puzzle Group The Alamogordo Public Library hosts an adult puzzle group, with multiple tables always dedicated to jigsaw puzzle building and dozens of puzzles available to choose from. Previously built puzzles are available for sale for a one-dollar donation.

Summer Reading Program The Alamogordo Public Library hosts an Adults’ and Children's Summer Reading Program every year. There are entertainment programs throughout the summer, and prizes given to all readers. In 2025 there were 793 children in the program, and 123 adults in the program with more than 3,000 prizes awarded to readers.

[edit]

== Notable features and collections ==
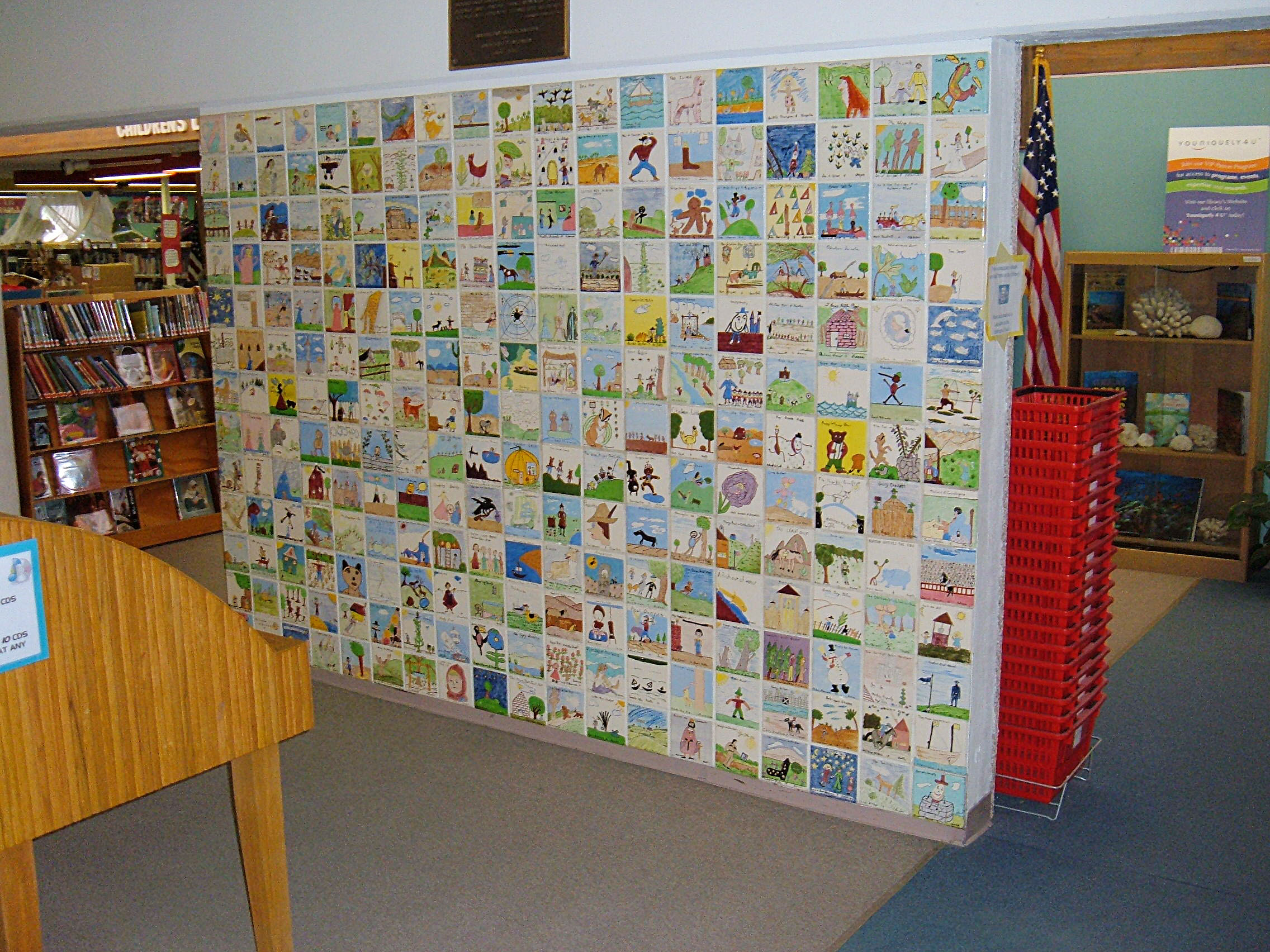
Story Book Wall, created in 1963

The Story Book Wall is a collection of 247 tiles illustrating children's books and installed on the wall near the Children's Library. Drawings were created by local schoolchildren in 1963 and copied onto tiles. The project was carried out by the local chapter of American Association of University Women.

The Eugene Manlove Rhodes Room, constructed as part of the 1987 expansion, holds the library's collection of Southwest books and materials. Within the room are a bank teller wall rescued from a bank in Vaughn, New Mexico and desks and other pieces of furniture from the early 1900s. In 1958 the Civic League purchased W. H. Hutchinson's collection of Eugene Manlove Rhodes materials and donated them to the library. The collection consists of books, correspondence, clippings, some magazines, and a few original manuscripts. These items and some other Rhodes-related items collected by past library director June Harwell have been photocopied, cataloged, and scanned into computer files and are available to researchers.
