= Alamogordo High School =

Location
- 103 Cuba Avenue; Alamogordo, New Mexico 88310; United States; 32°53′34″N 105°56′52″W

Information
- Type: Public High School
- School district: Alamogordo Public Schools
- Principal: April Shay
- Teaching staff: 89.50 (on an FTE basis)
- Grades: 9-12
- Enrollment: 1,527 (2023-2024)
- Student to teacher ratio: 17.06
- Website: ahs.alamogordoschools.org

Alamogordo High School is a public high school in Alamogordo, New Mexico. It is a part of Alamogordo Public Schools.

== History ==
Alamogordo High was established in 1919 in a 13–classroom facility made of brick, which had two floors.

In 1949 the high school admitted its first student with African descent, who was mixed African/German American, just to play sports, although he had to take classes at the all-black Delaware School for Negro Children. When the personnel at Holloman Air Force Base asked for the school district to completely desegregate for the benefit of its black employees, the school system did so. In 1968 the current high school facility, which had Phase I constructed, opened while the junior high school moved into the former high school building. In 1969 Alamogordo Mid High School opened, so only grades 11-12 were at Alamogordo High while grades 9-10 went to the new school.

In 1968 there was a student strike at Alamogordo High School, headed by 12 and involving about 300, which demanded improved conditions for teachers and students.

== Areas served ==
In addition to Alamogordo, the school serves Boles Acres, High Rolls, Holloman Air Force Base, La Luz, and Orogrande.

The area around the former Cienega School is about 100 miles (160 km) from Alamogordo and 20 miles (32 km) from Dell City, Texas; while it is in the Alamogordo district boundaries, due to the respective distances the Alamogordo district has an agreement with Dell City Independent School District so that district could educate high school students in that area.

== Notable alumni ==
- Rachel Black - former member of the New Mexico House of Representatives
- Eric Dorton - Professional baseball coach
- Conrad Hamilton - former NFL cornerback
- Alan Hale - Co-discovery of Comet Hale–Bopp
