= Weed, New Mexico =

- Census-designated place
- Location within New Mexico
- Coordinates: 32°48′09″N 105°31′29″W
- Country: United States
- State: New Mexico
- County: Otero

Area
  - Total: 8.98 sq mi (23.25 km^{2})
  - Land: 8.97 sq mi (23.24 km^{2})
  - Water: 0.0039 sq mi (0.01 km^{2})
- Elevation: 7,215 ft (2,199 m)

Population (2020)
  - Total: 67
  - Density: 7.5/sq mi (2.88/km^{2})
- Time zone: UTC-7 (Mountain (MST))
  - Summer (DST): UTC-6 (MDT)
- Area code: 575
- GNIS feature ID: 2584235
- Website: www.weednm.org

Weed is a hamlet and a census-designated place in Otero County, New Mexico, United States. It lies alongside New Mexico State Road 24 on the southeastern slopes of the Sacramento Mountains at an elevation of 7,215 ft. It has had a Post Office since 1885. As of the 2020 census, Weed had a population of 67.

== History ==
Weed was founded in 1884 by George and Elizabeth Lewis. It was named after William H. Weed, who opened a branch store there.

== Economy ==
The Weed Store Llc. is owned and operated by Mike and Anna Jones. The store was purchased in 2014 by the family and continued to provide gas and supplies to residents and tourists after the last general store and gas station closed in 2008.

== Education ==
It is within Cloudcroft Municipal Schools.

Previously Alamogordo Public Schools operated Weed Elementary School and Weed High School. Weed High School opened circa 1885. Previously Weed schools were under the Otero County Board of Education. Weed residents believed the Alamogordo district would be more likely to keep their schools open if there was an enrollment decrease, so they opted for Alamogordo schools instead of Cloudcroft schools. The Cloudcroft school board disliked the decision and in 1958 passed a motion stating that the district should not accept Weed or Piñon students even if their respective areas offered to pay tuition to Cloudcroft schools. Weed Schools consolidated into the Alamogordo district on July 1, 1959.

In 1970 the State of New Mexico funded the Weed School with $69,000 for one year, arguing that the school's continued operation was a necessity. Weed High School had grades 7-12. In 1991 the Weed schools had 50 students, with 25 each in elementary and secondary levels, and five secondary teachers. On April 15 of that year Alamogordo board voted 4-0 to close Weed High, citing operating expenses as the annual Weed High expenses were $247,000 while it collected $147,000 that year from Weed residents. It made a deal with Cloudcroft schools to have the children sent there. Some Weed residents did not like the deal as they perceived Cloudcroft schools to be too large and because the Cloudcroft area catered to tourists. The Weed secondary teachers had the option of taking jobs in Alamogordo schools. Because Weed Elementary remained as a part of the Alamogordo district, it meant that the elementary and high school students had different scheduling. Weed residents did not believe the Alamogordo operation figures, but felt they had no recourse as they believed they could not afford to hire adequate legal representation. The Cloudcroft district did not begin charging tuition to Alamogordo schools and relied on increased funding from its higher enrollment.

In the 1991-1992 school year Weed Elementary had 18 students, and two teachers. In 1991-1992 various Weed parents told the Alamogordo district that a teacher they disliked should be moved from the school or they would not move their children to other schools. The district chose not to remove the teacher. For the 1992-1993 school year the projected enrollment was 24. By August 1992 the teacher criticized by Weed parents remained while the other teacher did not go back to Weed Elementary. The parents opposed to the remaining teacher withdrew 20 of the children. By August 29, 1992 no students showed up to Weed Elementary. Area parents sent them to the Timberon school or to Cloudcroft Schools. The Cloudcroft district chose to accept the Weed students. Under New Mexico law a school with less than eight students should not operate, so the Alamogordo district decided to close Weed Elementary. The Alamogordo district offered jobs in Alamogordo schools to the Weed elementary employees, including the only remaining teacher. The district still chose to employ the teacher instead of keeping the school open. At that point all grade levels K-12 were officially designated to Cloudcroft schools. By October 1992 Weed area parents were campaigning to have the elementary school reopened. In November 1992 the Cloudcroft district's board passed a resolution to annex portions of the Alamogordo district, including Weed. In a separate motion the district drew new electoral boundaries with the annexed area effective the approval of said annexation.

== Demographics ==
Historical population
Census	Pop.	Note	%±
2020	67		—
U.S. Decennial Census

== Notable people ==
- Glenn Strange, actor
