= Bent, New Mexico =

- Census-designated place
- Location within New Mexico
- Coordinates: 33°08′35″N 105°52′55″W
- Country: United States
- State: New Mexico
- County: Otero

Area
  - Total: 6.14 sq mi (15.90 km^{2})
  - Land: 6.14 sq mi (15.89 km^{2})
  - Water: 0.0039 sq mi (0.01 km^{2})
- Elevation: 6,001 ft (1,829 m)

Population (2020)
  - Total: 150
  - Density: 24.4/sq mi (9.44/km^{2})
- Time zone: UTC-7 (Mountain (MST))
  - Summer (DST): UTC-6 (MDT)
- ZIP code: 88314
- Area code: 575
- GNIS feature ID: 2584054

Bent is a census-designated place in Otero County, New Mexico, United States. Its population was 150 as of the 2020 census. Bent has a post office with ZIP code 88314. U.S. Route 70 passes through the community.

== History ==
A post office called Bent has been in operation since 1906. The community has the name of George Bent, a businessperson in the local mining industry.

== Demographics ==
Historical population
Census	Pop.	Note	%±
2010	119		—
2020	150		26.1%
U.S. Decennial Census

== Education ==
Bent is within the Tularosa Municipal Schools district.

== Notable people ==
- Myrtle Scharrer Betz (1895-1992), Florida conservationist, fisherwoman, and author, whose family, from 1946 to 1954, spent summers at an orchard they owned in Bent.
