= White Sands Ranch =

White Sands Ranch (32°44′50″N 106°08′35″W) is a locale of private land in Otero County, New Mexico, near federal lands of the Tularosa Basin acquired during World War II. Located on the border of the White Sands Missile Range on census block 1168 between Las Cruces and Alamogordo, the site is about 40 mi (64 km) northeast of the White Sands Census Designated Place. Part of the White Sands Ranchers of New Mexico vs. United States legal case denied additional Takings Clause remuneration, the ranch includes numerous buildings and a pond on Wsmr S Rt 250.
