= Newman, New Mexico =

Unincorporated community in New Mexico, US

Coordinates: 32°00′12″N 106°19′23″W

Newman is an unincorporated community in Otero County, New Mexico, United States.
