= Hortonville, New Mexico =

- Unincorporated community
- Location within New Mexico
- Coordinates: 32°54′41″N 105°32′09″W
- Country: United States
- State: New Mexico
- County: Otero
- Elevation: 7,067 ft (2,154 m)
- Time zone: UTC-7 (Mountain (MST))
  - Summer (DST): UTC-6 (MDT)
- Area code: 575
- GNIS feature ID: 1987529

Hortonville is an unincorporated community in Otero County, New Mexico, United States.
