= Paulville =

Planned community in Hudspeth County, Texas

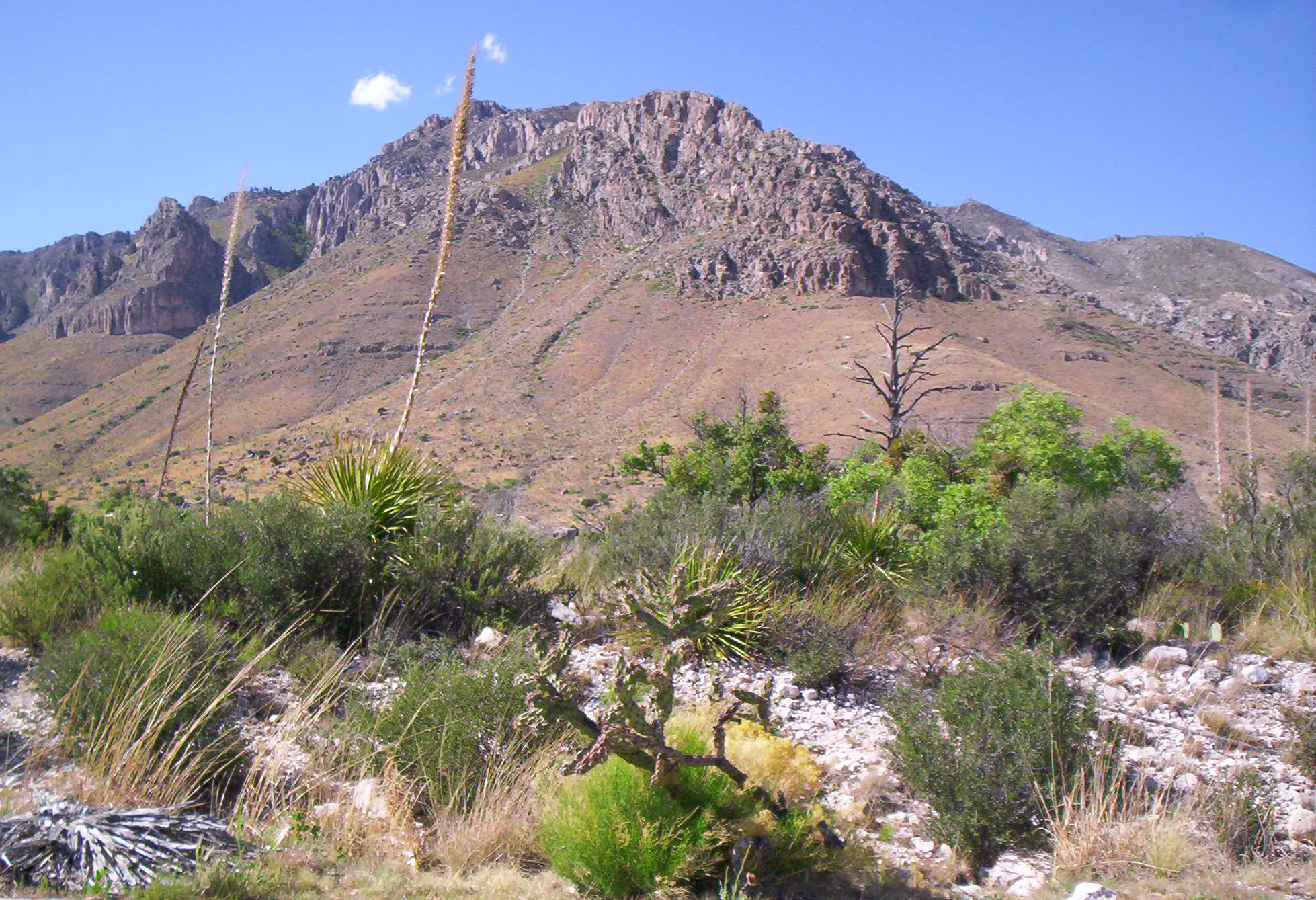
One view of the local Guadalupe Mountains.

Paulville, Texas, was an American cooperative organization as well as the site and planned community under its development in the salt flats of north Hudspeth County, intended to consist exclusively of Ron Paul supporters. The Paulville community was named after the U.S. Congressman and established in January 2008 following the rise in popularity of his 2008 campaign (and retained attention through his equally-popular 2012 campaign). The cooperative was modeled on Paul's often libertarian ideas. The site was never developed, and the organization is now inactive.

== Location ==
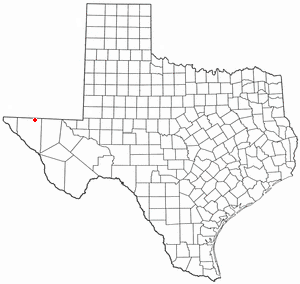
Location of nearby Dell City, Texas.

The Paulville site was located in the undeveloped salt flats outside of city limits, located south-southwest of rural Dell City, Texas (population 365 in 2010), north of U.S. Route 180, and an hour east of El Paso. It was also 770 miles (1,240 km) from Paul's East Texas office of Lake Jackson. The organizers said 50 acres (20 ha) had been purchased. Photos reveal the range of the Guadalupe Mountains 15 miles (24 km) east, and the local area has occasional deer and tumbleweeds. The mountain area is also noted for elk, coyotes, jack rabbits, desert cottontails, ring-tailed ground squirrels, and gray foxes. Another mountain range looms just west.

The site is located within Texas's 23rd Congressional district and is represented by Republican Tony Gonzales.

== Organization ==
The property became available to the community when offered for sale on eBay by its original owner. The cooperative was also called "Paulville.org", after its website, which is now inactive, and was established on January 27, 2008, by Ron Paul meetup organizer Jason Ebacher of Farwell, Minnesota. It was held by a cooperative of shareholders, who held a first organizational meeting in April 2008 and who vote on essentials such as utilities. Ebacher appeared in a one-hour conceptual video, created for Ron Paul Television prior to the purchase; captioned "Television for the revolution", it was carried by The New York Times, which meanwhile chided the website for a libertarian "view of the laws of grammar, spelling and punctuation" and noted its lack of contact information. On May 12, 2008, web content formerly at Paulville.org became unavailable, which Politico considered as possibly suggesting "a perilous time for the infant community." The website and organization have remained inactive since.

== Development ==
Planners claimed to metaphorically raise the Paulville town sign and planned to establish septic and electrical systems on an opt-out basis reflective of principles of individualism: citizens would not be required to use the cooperative's water and energy supplies and may choose to live off-grid. Members say they chose the West Texas plot for its high amount of sunshine, favoring off-grid solar panels. Buying in and homesteading the land from scratch was expected to take significant work, which the organizers warned is "not for the faint of heart". In his conceptual video, Ebacher described the ease of raising sheep and chickens, and the relative merits of energy from solar power, wind, water, and biodiesel fuels. Members also discussed alternatives for conveniences like cell phones and internet connections. Little to none of this infrastructure was ever built, and the site remains empty and uninhabited as of 2021.

A gated community unhindered by planning regulations was intended, followed by additional communities in sites like New Hampshire, South Dakota, Wyoming, Alaska, or Montana;. Members' beliefs that ideologically like-minded individuals can form a detached, thriving community have been echoed by experiments such as the Free State Project in New Hampshire, New Australia in Paraguay, the Findhorn Foundation community in Scotland, and Celebration and Ave Maria in Florida. Ideology-based communities have ranged from communism to environmentalism. Jonathan Dawson, an educator based at Findhorn, questions the point of inward-facing micro-communities, but talks about "providing an example" to others: "It's not useful to retreat just for the sake of it."

== Reaction ==
The site was chosen by and for the large market of "100% Ron Paul supporters and or people that live by the ideals of freedom and liberty"; motivated followers of Paul have been estimated to number several hundred thousand, have had fundraising history that suggests "seemingly bottomless bank accounts", and appear not to be giving up in pursuing his 2008 and 2012 campaign goals. Paulville has attracted mixed reviews. The alternative Seattle Stranger found it suitable for those who have "the covenant of freedom espoused by Ron Paul guiding their every decision". The Houston-based Lone Star Times referred to founding members as "Paulvillains" and as creating "an insane asylum", and presented diverse posts from forum members, while Philly.com and Reason anticipated other "dusty exurbs" named after presidential candidates, both citing "Bidentown" as an imaginary example. The Guardian expects shareholders to be interested in libertarian views like "the right to wield semi-automatic weapons and the abolition of income tax", and the Economist wonders whether the new town constituted "a framework for utopia, or just a hilarious catastrophe".

Paul himself was ambivalent about Paulville: "You want to spread out and be as pervasive as possible .... I don’t see [Paulville] as a solution, but it can't hurt anything either." He believes that "it shows how desperate people are for freedom." He found the prospects for additional communities entertaining, but said, "I don't know how much [Paulvilles] would do." Andrew Sullivan of the Atlantic said, "Who wants to live around people who agree with you on everything? Not my kind of libertarian"; he was echoed by Jesse Walker of Reason. The Libertarian Party of Texas believed Paulville had potential for demonstrating practical libertarianism in action.

== See also ==
- Free State Project
- Meadeau View Institute
