= Alamogordo Public Schools =

School district in New Mexico, US

Address
- 1211 Hawaii Avenue Alamogordo, New Mexico, 88310; United States
- Coordinates: 32°54′9″N 105°57′2″W

District information
- Type: Public school district
- Grades: P–12
- Superintendent: Michael Crabtree
- Schools: 15
- NCES District ID: 3500030

Students and staff
- Students: 5,572 (2020–2021)
- Teachers: 322.42 (on an FTE basis)
- Student–teacher ratio: 17.28 (on an FTE basis)

Other information
- Website: www.alamogordoschools.org

The Alamogordo Municipal School District No. 1, also the Alamogordo Public School District or Alamogordo Public Schools (APS), is a school district that serves the communities of Alamogordo, High Rolls, Holloman Air Force Base, Mountain Park, and La Luz and portions of unincorporated Otero County in the state of New Mexico.

== History ==
The first school in the city opened in 1898, originally using a tent, although the school district itself was organized in 1914. The district considers 1898 as its year of establishment.

Enrollment around World War II increased with the opening of Alamogordo Army Air Field (now Holloman Air Force Base), causing a previously stable student population to increase. In 1947 it had 1,500 students and 53 teachers. In 1949 Alamogordo High School began admitting African-American students, and by 1951 the school district was racially integrated. When the personnel at the base asked for the school district to completely desegregate for the benefit of its black employees, the school system did so.

On July 1, 1959 the following school areas consolidated into Alamogordo schools: Cienega, High Rolls, La Luz, Orogrande, Piñon, and Weed. 325 total students were in these schools. Previously Weed schools were under the Otero County Board of Education. Weed residents believed the Alamogordo district would be more likely to keep their schools open if there was an enrollment decrease, so in 1958 they decided to join Alamogordo schools instead of Cloudcroft Municipal Schools. The Cloudcroft school board disliked the decision and in 1958 passed a motion stating that the district should not accept Weed or Pinon students even if their respective areas offered to pay tuition to Cloudcroft schools. Upon obtaining the areas, the Alamogordo school board closed the elementary schools in Orogrande and Piñon. The Piñon community appealed, but in December 1959 the board upheld its decision.

In 1967 it had 8,900 students and 415 teachers. In May 1970 it had 9,947 students.

In November 1992 the Cloudcroft district's board passed a resolution to annex portions of the Alamogordo district, including Piñon, Timberon, and Weed, as well as several ranches. By that time all Alamogordo district facilities in Weed had closed.

== Attendance area ==
In addition to Alamogordo it serves Boles Acres, High Rolls, Holloman Air Force Base, La Luz, and Orogrande. It also includes the Mountain Park area.

The area around the former Cienega School is about 100 miles (160 km) from Alamogordo and 20 miles (32 km) from Dell City, Texas; while it is in the Alamogordo district boundaries, due to the respective distances, the Alamogordo district has an agreement with Dell City Independent School District, so that district could educate students from the Cienega area. Dell City ISD served grades 9-12 from that area after the opening of Alamogordo district's grade 1-8 Cienega School in 1965. In 1967 the eighth grade was moved to Dell City ISD. In 1970, all grades K-12 were and are sent to Dell City ISD as Cienega School closed.

== Schools ==
There are fifteen schools in Alamogordo Public Schools, including one standalone preschool program, nine elementary schools, three middle schools, one regular high school, and one alternative high school.

School name	Grades	Enrollment (2020–2021)	Website
Academy Del Sol	10–12	84	
Alamogordo High School	9–12	1,516	
Buena Vista Elementary	K–5	189	
Chaparral Middle School	6–8	600	
Desert Star Elementary	K–5	499	
High Rolls Mountain Park Elementary	K–5	21	
Holloman Elementary	P–5	429	
Holloman Middle School	6–8	176	
La Luz Elementary	K–5	211	
Mountain View Middle School	6–8	533	
North Elementary	K–5	233	
Sierra Elementary	K–5	295	
Stepping Stone Preschool	Preschool	128	
Sunset Hills Elementary	K–5	394	
Yucca Elementary	K–5	264	

=== Former schools ===
- Alamogordo Mid-High School - Established in 1969 in the former Central Junior High
- Central Junior High School - In 1968 the school district sold its campus to the city government, so it moved into the former Alamogordo High, which moved into another building. It changed into Alamogordo Mid-High School in 1969
- Central Building - It had eight classrooms on two stories and opened in 1910. In 1953 it was demolished.
- Cienega School - Initially having grades 1-8, it opened in 1965. It became a grade 1-7 school in 1967, and it closed in 1971. In 1970 there was a closing review as Cienega area residents stated that bus rides to/from Dell City would take 2 1/2 hours per direction. In 1970 the Cienega area had 14 elementary students at Cienega School and 24 junior and senior high school students attending Dell City schools. The cost of sending one student to Dell City was $450 while the Cienega School had a per student cost of $1,400.
- Delaware School for Negro Students
- Dudley School - It had four classrooms and opened in 1914, with the school housing first graders. Circa the 1950s/1960s it became a special education facility.
- East Building - It had six classrooms on two stories and opened in 1900. In 1954 it was demolished.
- Heights Elementary School - It opened in 1957. In 1960 an addition opened.
- Indiana Elementary School - It opened in 1947 with the first grade in a former mortuary purchased by the school district. It became the district headquarters in 1958.
- Little Red School House (Timberon) - It was a winter-only elementary school facility that opened in December 1980. By 1992 it became a year-round school. The projected enrollment for the 1992-1993 school year was around 9, but because multiple Weed parents decided to send their children to Timberon instead, the actual enrolled student count that year was 18. The school was acquired by the Cloudcroft district in 1992 and continued operating until May 26, 2002.
- South Elementary School - It opened in 1956. In 1965 it became a special education school. In 1972 it became the Alamogordo Center for Exceptional Students.
- Weed High School (Weed) Weed High School opened circa 1885. The school served Piñon secondary students even before it joined to Alamogordo district, which the school did in 1959. In 1970 the State of New Mexico funded the Weed School with $69,000 for one year, arguing that the school's continued operation was a necessity. Weed High School had grades 7-12. In 1991 the Weed schools had 50 students, with 25 each in elementary and secondary levels, and five secondary teachers. On April 15 of that year Alamogordo board voted 4-0 to close Weed High, citing operating expenses as the annual Weed High expenses were $247,000 while it collected $147,000 that year from Weed residents. It made a deal with Cloudcroft schools to have the children sent there. Some Weed residents did not like the deal as they perceived Cloudcroft schools to be too large and because the Cloudcroft area catered to tourists. The Weed secondary teachers had the option of taking jobs in Alamogordo schools. Because Weed Elementary remained as a part of the Alamogordo district, it meant that the elementary and high school students had different scheduling. Weed residents did not believe the Alamogordo operation figures, but felt they had no recourse as they believed they could not afford to hire adequate legal representation. The Cloudcroft district did not begin charging tuition to Alamogordo schools and relied on increased funding from its higher enrollment.
- Weed Elementary School (Weed) - It joined Alamogordo Schools in 1959. That year the Alamogordo board began sending Piñon students to Weed Elementary. In the 1991-1992 school year Weed Elementary had 18 students, and two teachers. In 1991-1992 various Weed parents told the Alamogordo district that a teacher they disliked should be moved from the school or they would not move their children to other schools. The district chose not to remove the teacher. For the 1992-1993 school year the projected enrollment was 24. By August 1992 the teacher criticized by Weed parents remained while the other teacher did not go back to Weed Elementary. The parents opposed to the remaining teacher withdrew 20 of the children. By August 29, 1992 no students showed up to Weed Elementary. Area parents sent them to the Timberon school or to Cloudcroft Schools. The Cloudcroft district chose to accept the Weed students. Under New Mexico law a school with less than eight students should not operate, so the Alamogordo district decided to close Weed Elementary. The Alamogordo district offered jobs in Alamogordo schools to the Weed elementary employees, including the only remaining teacher. The district still chose to employ the teacher instead of keeping the school open. At that point all grade levels K-12 were officially designated to Cloudcroft schools. By October 1992 Weed area parents were campaigning to have the elementary school reopened. In November 1992 the Cloudcroft district's board passed a resolution to annex portions of the Alamogordo district, including Weed. In a separate motion the district drew new electoral boundaries with the annexed area effective the approval of said annexation.

== Other facilities ==
The district headquarters, the former Indiana Elementary School, became used for the purpose in 1958.

The lighted athletic field, which had 4,500-seat bleacher facilities, a .25 miles (0.40 km) cinder running track, opened in 1957, with a concession stand/field house opening in 1965.
