= Boles Acres, New Mexico =

- CDP
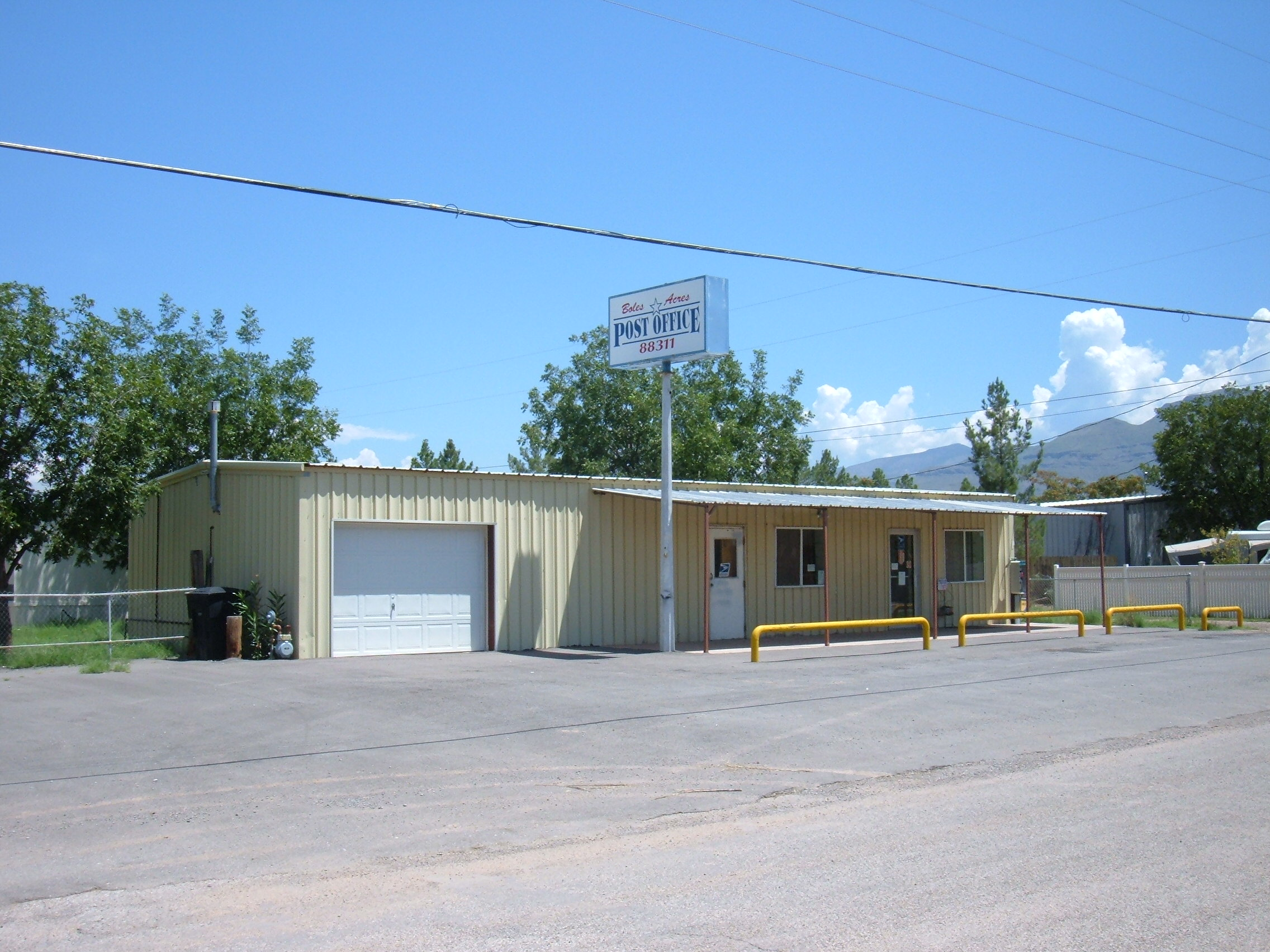
- Boles Acres Post Office

- Location of Boles Acres, New Mexico

- Location in the United States
- Coordinates: 32°49′11″N 105°58′41″W
- Country: United States
- State: New Mexico
- County: Otero

Area
  - Total: 12.24 sq mi (31.70 km^{2})
  - Land: 12.24 sq mi (31.70 km^{2})
  - Water: 0 sq mi (0.00 km^{2})
- Elevation: 4,137 ft (1,261 m)

Population (2020)
  - Total: 1,788
  - Density: 146/sq mi (56.4/km^{2})
- Time zone: UTC-7 (Mountain (MST))
  - Summer (DST): UTC-6 (MDT)
- Area code: 575
- FIPS code: 35-08440
- GNIS feature ID: 2407874

Boles Acres is a census-designated place (CDP) in Otero County, New Mexico, United States. As of the 2020 census, Boles Acres had a population of 1,788.

== Geography ==
The community is on US Route 54 approximately five miles south of Alamogordo and adjacent to the Alamogordo-White Sands Regional Airport.

According to the United States Census Bureau, the CDP has a total area of 12.2 square miles (32 km^{2}), all land.

== Demographics ==
Historical population
Census	Pop.	Note	%±
2020	1,788		—
U.S. Decennial Census

As of the census of 2000, there were 1,172 people, 463 households, and 355 families residing in the CDP. The population density was 90.8 inhabitants per square mile (35.1/km^{2}). There were 562 housing units at an average density of 43.6 per square mile (16.8/km^{2}). The racial makeup of the CDP was 86.86% White, 1.28% African American, 0.34% Native American, 1.11% Asian, 0.17% Pacific Islander, 6.91% from other races, and 3.33% from two or more races. Hispanic or Latino of any race were 15.44% of the population.

There were 463 households, out of which 30.5% had children under the age of 18 living with them, 66.1% were married couples living together, 6.5% had a female householder with no husband present, and 23.3% were non-families. 20.5% of all households were made up of individuals, and 6.5% had someone living alone who was 65 years of age or older. The average household size was 2.53 and the average family size was 2.91.

In the CDP, the population was spread out, with 24.4% under the age of 18, 6.4% from 18 to 24, 25.8% from 25 to 44, 28.6% from 45 to 64, and 14.8% who were 65 years of age or older. The median age was 41 years. For every 100 females, there were 99.3 males. For every 100 females age 18 and over, there were 101.8 males.

The median income for a household in the CDP was $39,048, and the median income for a family was $51,029. Males had a median income of $32,656 versus $19,779 for females. The per capita income for the CDP was $18,207. About 9.4% of families and 13.3% of the population were below the poverty line, including 20.0% of those under age 18 and 13.5% of those age 65 or over.

== Education ==
It is zoned to Alamogordo Public Schools. Sierra Elementary School and Yucca Elementary School serve sections of Boles Acres. Mountain View Middle School is the zoned middle school for all of Boles Acres. Alamogordo High School is the district's comprehensive high school.

== See also ==
- List of census-designated places in New Mexico
