= Eric Dorton =

American baseball coach

Texas Rangers – No. 82
- Coach
- Born: 1990 (age 35–36)
- Bats: Right Throws: Right
- Stats at Baseball Reference

Teams
- Texas Rangers (2026–present)

Eric Dorton (born January, 1990) is an American professional baseball coach who currently serves as the assistant hitting coach for the Texas Rangers of Major League Baseball (MLB).

== Career ==
Dorton grew up in Alamogordo, New Mexico and attended Alamogordo High School. Dorton attended University of New Mexico in 2008 after high school, but refused to redshirt and was released without playing for the school. He then played college baseball at Eastern Arizona College, Lamar Community College, and West Texas A&M University.

From 2013 through 2018, Dorton spent time as a coach at West Texas A&M, Cloud County Community College, Tarleton State University, and Lamar Community College.

He joined the Texas Rangers organization in 2019, serving as the hitting coach for the Arizona League Rangers. He spent the 2021 season as the Down East Wood Ducks hitting coach and the 2022 season as the Frisco Roughriders hitting coach. Dorton spent the 2023 through 2025 seasons as the Rangers' minor league hitting coordinator.

Dorton received his first major league job, serving as the Texas Rangers assistant hitting coach in 2026.
