= Twin Forks, New Mexico =

- Census-designated place
- Location within New Mexico
- Coordinates: 32°56′47″N 105°38′15″W
- Country: United States
- State: New Mexico
- County: Otero

Area
  - Total: 4.13 sq mi (10.70 km^{2})
  - Land: 4.13 sq mi (10.69 km^{2})
  - Water: 0 sq mi (0.00 km^{2})
- Elevation: 8,137 ft (2,480 m)

Population (2020)
  - Total: 228
  - Density: 55.2/sq mi (21.32/km^{2})
- Time zone: UTC-7 (Mountain (MST))
  - Summer (DST): UTC-6 (MDT)
- Area code: 575
- GNIS feature ID: 2584228

Twin Forks is a census-designated place in Otero County, New Mexico, United States. As of the 2020 census, Twin Forks had a population of 228. U.S. Route 82 passes through the community.

== Demographics ==
Historical population
Census	Pop.	Note	%±
2020	228		—
U.S. Decennial Census

== Education ==
It is in Cloudcroft Municipal Schools.
