= Mountain Park, New Mexico =

Unincorporated community in New Mexico, US

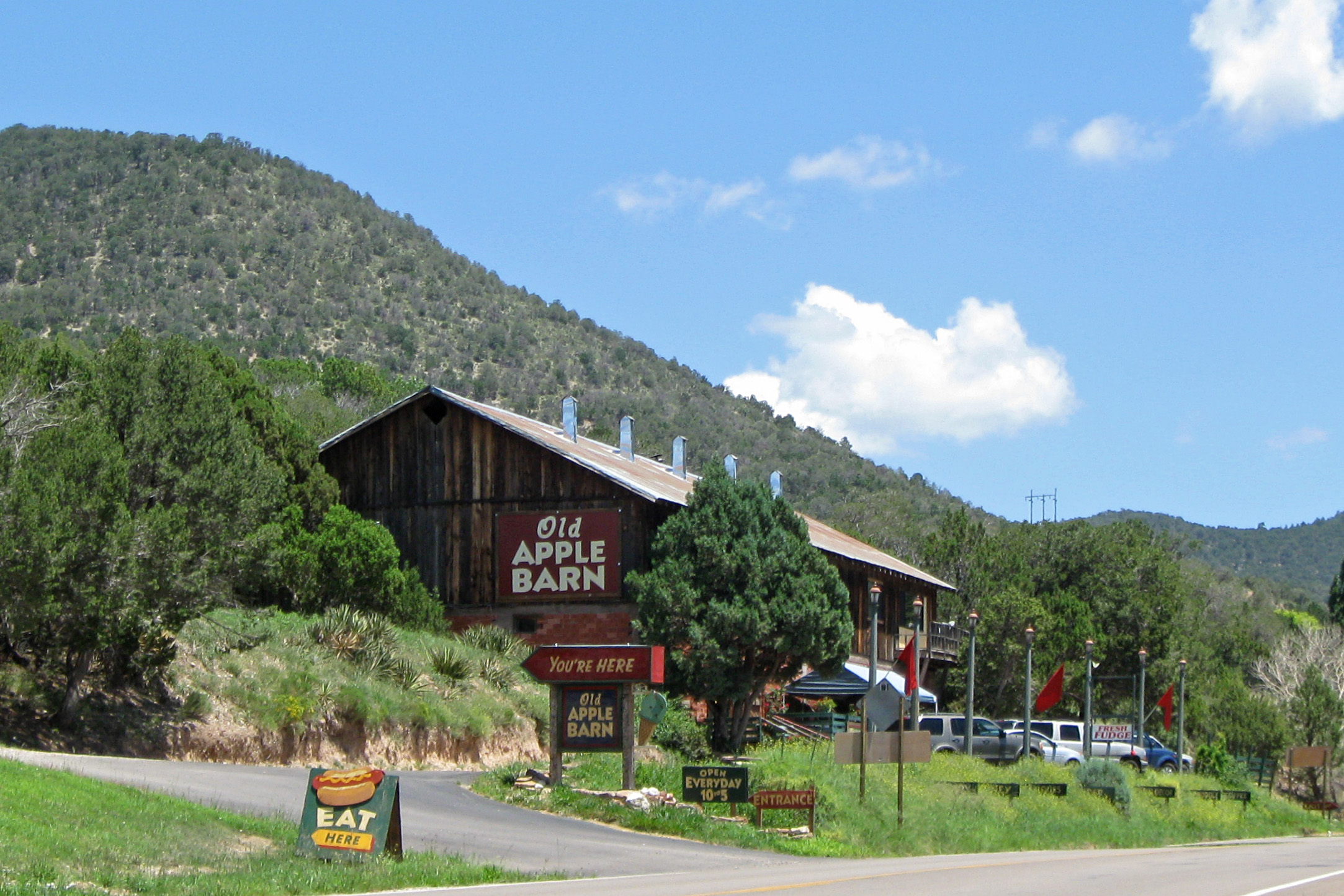
Old Apple Barn, a store in Mountain Park

Mountain Park is an unincorporated community in Otero County, New Mexico, United States. It is located at 32.951°N, 105.824°W, and its elevation is 6710 feet.

It is the birthplace of Bill Mauldin, an American editorial cartoonist and two-time winner of the Pulitzer Prize.

== Education ==
It is zoned to Alamogordo Public Schools. High Rolls/Mount Park Elementary is the zoned elementary school, while Chaparral Middle School is the zoned middle school. Alamogordo High School is the district's comprehensive high school.
