= Tularosa Municipal Schools =

School district in New Mexico, United States

Address
- 504 First Street Tularosa, New Mexico, 88352; United States

District information
- Grades: Pre-Kindergarten - 12
- Superintendent: Brenda Vigil
- NCES District ID: 3502670

Students and staff
- Enrollment: 812 (2020-2021)
- Faculty: 120
- Student–teacher ratio: 12.60
- District mascot: Wildcat

Other information
- Telephone: (575) 585-8800
- Website: www.tularosak12.us

Tularosa Municipal Schools is a public school district in Otero County, New Mexico, United States.

In addition to Tularosa its boundary includes Bent and Mescalero.

== Schools ==
The Tularosa Municipal Schools School District has two elementary schools, one middle school and one high school.

Elementary schools

- Tularosa Elementary School
- Tularosa Inter Elementary School

Middle schools

- Tullarosa Middle School

High schools

- Tularosa High School
