= Otero County, New Mexico =

County in New Mexico, United States

- County
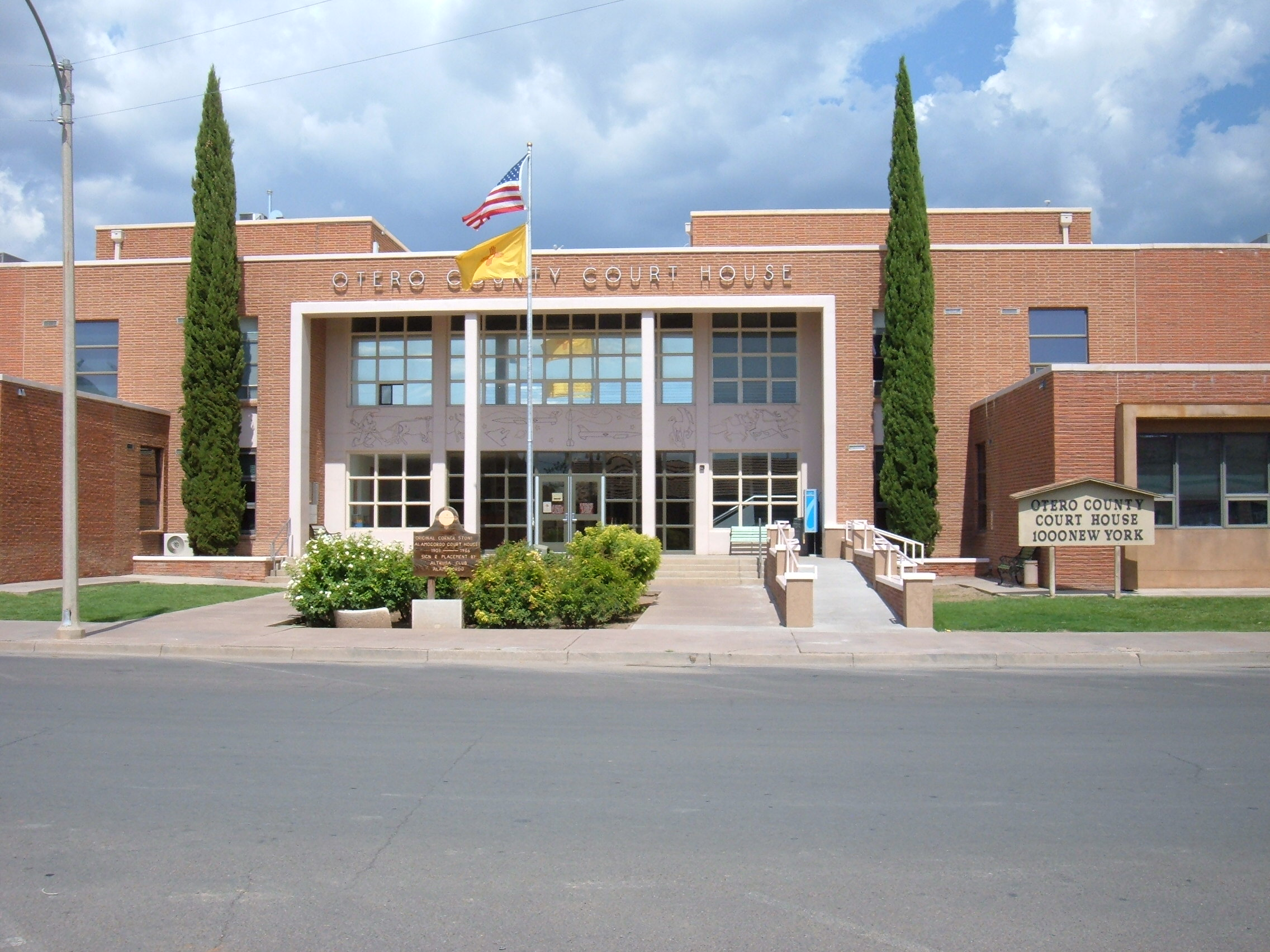
- Otero County courthouse in Alamogordo

- Flag

- Location within the U.S. state of New Mexico
- Coordinates: 32°37′N 105°44′W
- Country: United States
- State: New Mexico
- Founded: January 30, 1899
- Named for: Miguel Antonio Otero
- Seat: Alamogordo
- Largest city: Alamogordo

Area
  - Total: 6,628 sq mi (17,170 km^{2})
  - Land: 6,613 sq mi (17,130 km^{2})
  - Water: 14 sq mi (36 km^{2}) 0.2%

Population (2020)
  - Total: 67,839
  - Estimate (2025): 70,368 ▲
  - Density: 10.26/sq mi (3.961/km^{2})
- Time zone: UTC−7 (Mountain)
  - Summer (DST): UTC−6 (MDT)
- Congressional districts: 1st, 2nd
- Website: co.otero.nm.us

Otero County (Spanish: Condado de Otero) is a county located in the U.S. state of New Mexico. As of the 2020 census, the population was 67,839. Its county seat is Alamogordo. Its southern boundary is the Texas state line. It is named for Miguel Antonio Otero, the territorial governor when the county was created.

Otero County includes the Alamogordo Micropolitan Statistical Area.

== History ==
The western part of Otero County was handed over to the United States Army as the US was preparing to enter World War II and eventually became part of White Sands Missile Range. This did not significantly hinder the growth of the county, whose population more than doubled in the 1950s.

The county declared a state of emergency in April 2019 when the federal inspection stations on U.S. Route 70 and U.S. Route 54 were left unstaffed by U.S. Customs and Border Protection as part of the temporary closure of all six checkpoints in the El Paso Sector, which covers West Texas and New Mexico. The county was concerned about the possibility of illegal narcotics flowing north unchecked since the checkpoint agents had been shifted to the border to help process migrant asylum-seekers. The inspection stations reopened August 5, 2019.

On Monday June 13, 2022, the county commissioners attracted nationwide attention by refusing to certify the results of the local 2022 primary election on June 7, 2022. In response, the New Mexico Secretary of State filed a lawsuit and writ of mandamus against the commissioners for their refusal. By Friday June 17, 2022, two of the three commissioners agreed to certify the election results, which defused the crisis.

== Geography ==
According to the U.S. Census Bureau, the county has a total area of 6,628 square miles (17,170 km^{2}), of which 6,613 square miles (17,130 km^{2}) is land and 14 square miles (36 km^{2}) (0.2%) is water. It is the third-largest county in New Mexico by area.

=== Adjacent counties ===
- Doña Ana County – west
- Sierra County – northwest
- Lincoln County – north
- Chaves County – east
- Eddy County – east
- Culberson County, Texas – southeast
- Hudspeth County, Texas – south
- El Paso County, Texas – southwest

=== National protected areas ===
- Lincoln National Forest (part)
- White Sands National Park (part)

== Demographics ==
Historical population
Census	Pop.	Note	%±
1900	4,791		—
1910	7,069		47.5%
1920	7,902		11.8%
1930	9,779		23.8%
1940	10,522		7.6%
1950	14,909		41.7%
1960	36,976		148.0%
1970	41,097		11.1%
1980	44,665		8.7%
1990	51,928		16.3%
2000	62,298		20.0%
2010	63,797		2.4%
2020	67,839		6.3%
2025 (est.)	70,368	▲	3.7%
U.S. Decennial Census; 1790-1960 1900-1990; 1990-2000 2010

=== 2020 census ===
As of the 2020 census, the county had a population of 67,839, and the median age was 37.0 years; 23.0% of residents were under the age of 18 and 18.0% were 65 years of age or older. For every 100 females there were 105.5 males, and for every 100 females age 18 and over there were 106.3 males.

Otero County, New Mexico – Racial and ethnic composition Note: the US Census treats Hispanic/Latino as an ethnic category. This table excludes Latinos from the racial categories and assigns them to a separate category. Hispanics/Latinos may be of any race.
Race / Ethnicity (NH = Non-Hispanic)	Pop 2000	Pop 2010	Pop 2020	% 2000	% 2010	% 2020
White alone (NH)	34,728	33,716	30,931	55.74%	52.85%	45.60%
Black or African American alone (NH)	2,285	2,048	2,299	3.67%	3.21%	3.39%
Native American or Alaska Native alone (NH)	3,152	3,737	4,173	5.06%	5.86%	6.15%
Asian alone (NH)	685	716	1,001	1.10%	1.12%	1.48%
Pacific Islander alone (NH)	68	131	145	0.11%	0.21%	0.21%
Other race alone (NH)	105	78	377	0.17%	0.12%	0.56%
Mixed race or Multiracial (NH)	1,242	1,345	2,761	1.99%	2.11%	4.07%
Hispanic or Latino (any race)	20,033	22,026	26,152	32.16%	34.53%	38.55%
Total	62,298	63,797	67,839	100.00%	100.00%	100.00%

The racial makeup of the county was 56.3% White, 3.9% Black or African American, 7.3% American Indian and Alaska Native, 1.6% Asian, 0.3% Native Hawaiian and Pacific Islander, 12.3% from some other race, and 18.3% from two or more races; Hispanic or Latino residents of any race comprised 38.6% of the population.

According to the 2020 Demographic and Housing Characteristics (DHC) data, 45.4% of residents lived in urban areas while 54.6% lived in rural areas.

There were 25,932 households in the county, of which 29.5% had children under the age of 18 living with them and 26.8% had a female householder with no spouse or partner present. About 30.2% of all households were made up of individuals and 12.7% had someone living alone who was 65 years of age or older.

There were 32,210 housing units, of which 19.5% were vacant. Among occupied housing units, 67.4% were owner-occupied and 32.6% were renter-occupied. The homeowner vacancy rate was 2.9% and the rental vacancy rate was 9.8%.

=== 2010 census ===
As of the 2010 census, there were 63,797 people, 24,464 households, and 16,641 families living in the county. The population density was 9.6 inhabitants per square mile (3.7/km^{2}). There were 30,992 housing units at an average density of 4.7 per square mile (1.8/km^{2}). The racial makeup of the county was 70.7% white, 6.7% American Indian, 3.5% black or African American, 1.2% Asian, 0.2% Pacific islander, 11.5% from other races, and 4.2% from two or more races. Those of Hispanic or Latino origin made up 34.5% of the population. In terms of ancestry, 13.4% were German, 8.1% were English, 8.0% were Irish, and 4.4% were American.

Of the 24,464 households, 33.3% had children under the age of 18 living with them, 50.2% were married couples living together, 12.7% had a female householder with no husband present, 32.0% were non-families, and 27.1% of all households were made up of individuals. The average household size was 2.51 and the average family size was 3.05. The median age was 36.5 years.

The median income for a household in the county was $39,615 and the median income for a family was $46,210. Males had a median income of $32,939 versus $25,965 for females. The per capita income for the county was $19,255. About 15.2% of families and 20.0% of the population were below the poverty line, including 28.0% of those under age 18 and 13.5% of those age 65 or over.

=== 2000 census ===
As of the 2000 census, there were 62,298 people, 22,984 households, and 16,801 families living in the county. The population density was 9 people per square mile (3.5 people/km^{2}). There were 29,272 housing units at an average density of 4 per square mile (1.5/km^{2}). The racial makeup of the county was 71.73% White, 3.92% Black or African American, 5.80% Native American, 1.17% Asian, 0.13% Pacific Islander, 11.67% from other races, and 3.60% from two or more races. 32.16% of the population were Hispanic or Latino of any race.

There were 22,984 households, out of which 37.10% had children under the age of 18 living with them, 57.50% were married couples living together, 11.80% had a female householder with no husband present, and 26.90% were non-families. 23.30% of all households were made up of individuals, and 8.10% had someone living alone who was 65 years of age or older. The average household size was 2.66 and the average family size was 3.14.

In the county, the population was spread out, with 29.50% under the age of 18, 9.30% from 18 to 24, 28.60% from 25 to 44, 21.00% from 45 to 64, and 11.70% who were 65 years of age or older. The median age was 34 years. For every 100 females there were 99.00 males. For every 100 females age 18 and over, there were 96.80 males.

The median income for a household in the county was $30,861, and the median income for a family was $34,781. Males had a median income of $27,657 versus $18,470 for females. The per capita income for the county was $14,345. About 15.60% of families and 19.30% of the population were below the poverty line, including 27.90% of those under age 18 and 12.80% of those age 65 or over.

== Education ==
School districts in the county include:

- Alamogordo Public Schools
- Cloudcroft Municipal Schools
- Gadsden Independent Schools
- Tularosa Municipal Schools

While the southeast portion of the county is in the Alamogordo district, that district contracts education of residents there to the Dell City Independent School District of Dell City, Texas, due to the distances involved, as the mileage to Alamogordo from the former Cienega School was 100 miles (160 km) while the distance to Dell City is 20 miles (32 km).

Tribal schools affiliated with the Bureau of Indian Education (BIE):

- Mescalero Apache Schools

State-operated schools:

- New Mexico School for the Blind and Visually Impaired

Schools operated by foreign governments:

- Deutsche Schule Alamogordo (closed)

Tertiary:

- New Mexico State University Alamogordo

Public libraries:

- Alamogordo Public Library

== Communities ==
=== City ===
- Alamogordo (county seat)

=== Villages ===
- Cloudcroft
- Tularosa

=== Census-designated places ===
- Bent
- Boles Acres
- Chaparral
- High Rolls
- Holloman AFB
- La Luz
- Mayhill
- Mescalero
- Orogrande
- Piñon
- Sacramento
- Timberon
- Twin Forks
- Weed

=== Unincorporated communities ===
- Hortonville
- Mountain Park
- Newman
- Sunspot
- Three Rivers

== Other places ==
- Mescalero Apache Indian Reservation
- National Solar Observatory
- Otero County Prison Facility
- White Sands National Park
- White Sands Ranch (private land)

== Politics and government ==
Otero County is a Republican stronghold, having last voted for a Democratic candidate in 1964. Governance of the county is under a three-member county commission.

United States presidential election results for Otero County, New Mexico
Year	Republican		Democratic		Third party(ies)	
Year	No.	%	No.	%	No.	%
1912	220	21.87%	420	41.75%	366	36.38%
1916	561	37.03%	824	54.39%	130	8.58%
1920	1,229	51.36%	1,095	45.76%	69	2.88%
1924	832	41.17%	886	43.84%	303	14.99%
1928	1,250	51.91%	1,148	47.67%	10	0.42%
1932	969	30.99%	2,091	66.87%	67	2.14%
1936	1,333	39.73%	1,989	59.28%	33	0.98%
1940	1,596	47.09%	1,788	52.76%	5	0.15%
1944	1,467	43.63%	1,892	56.28%	3	0.09%
1948	1,354	36.27%	2,361	63.25%	18	0.48%
1952	2,456	53.16%	2,162	46.80%	2	0.04%
1956	3,919	60.45%	2,558	39.46%	6	0.09%
1960	4,507	47.81%	4,916	52.15%	3	0.03%
1964	3,498	36.59%	6,035	63.13%	27	0.28%
1968	4,475	43.77%	3,978	38.91%	1,771	17.32%
1972	7,033	65.91%	2,981	27.94%	656	6.15%
1976	5,914	52.10%	5,333	46.98%	105	0.92%
1980	7,210	60.26%	4,111	34.36%	644	5.38%
1984	9,751	69.22%	4,167	29.58%	169	1.20%
1988	9,984	64.50%	5,284	34.14%	210	1.36%
1992	7,481	46.17%	5,377	33.19%	3,345	20.64%
1996	9,065	55.49%	5,938	36.35%	1,334	8.17%
2000	10,258	63.31%	5,465	33.73%	481	2.97%
2004	14,066	67.74%	6,433	30.98%	265	1.28%
2008	12,806	58.83%	8,610	39.56%	350	1.61%
2012	12,451	62.22%	6,829	34.12%	732	3.66%
2016	11,887	59.26%	6,124	30.53%	2,049	10.21%
2020	14,521	61.61%	8,485	36.00%	565	2.40%
2024	15,117	62.36%	8,582	35.40%	543	2.24%

== Transportation ==
=== Major highways ===
- US 54
- US 70
- US 82
- NM 24
- NM 130
- NM 244
- NM 506
- NM 545
- NM 6563

== See also ==
- National Register of Historic Places listings in Otero County, New Mexico
- South Central Regional Transit District
