= High Rolls, New Mexico =

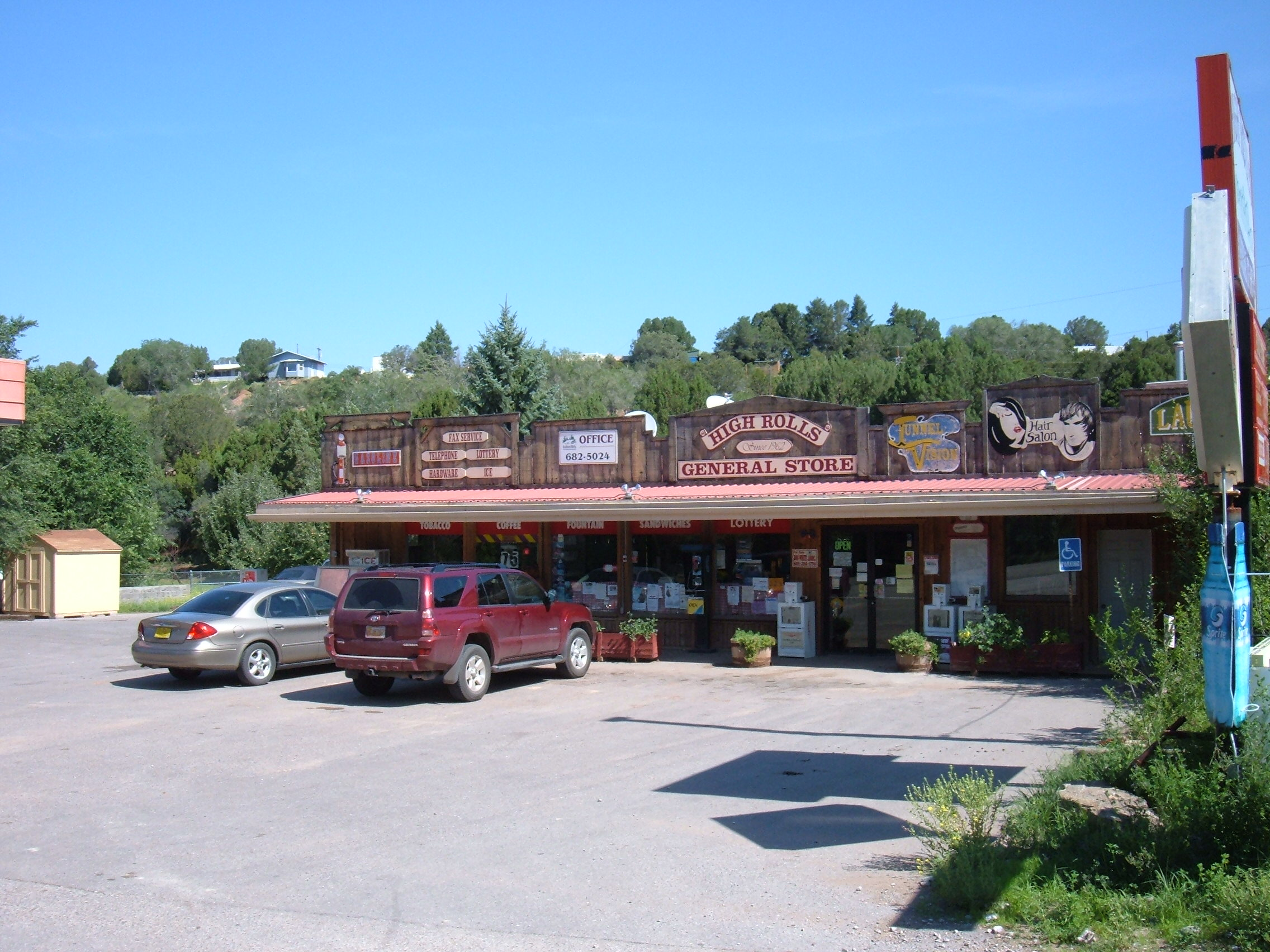
- High Rolls General Store

- Location within the state of New Mexico
- Coordinates: 32°56′20″N 105°49′17″W
- Country: United States
- State: New Mexico
- County: Otero
- Elevation: 6,750 ft (2,060 m)
- Time zone: UTC-7 (MST)
  - Summer (DST): UTC-6 (MDT)
- GNIS feature ID: 2584111

High Rolls is an unincorporated community and census-designated place in Otero County, New Mexico, United States. It is nestled within the Lincoln National Forest at the southernmost tip of the Sacramento Mountains. As of the 2020 census, High Rolls had a population of 862.

== History ==
Mexicans who settled in the Tularosa Basin in the mid-1880s obtained water rights to graze cattle in the fertile canyons of the Sacramento Mountains. By the 1880s, homesteaders discovered the area, bought the water rights and began establishing farms.

David M. Sutherland located in the High Rolls area in 1883 and was soon followed by Francisco Maes and Cipriano Tefoya, who came up from La Luz in 1884 and settled in the Mountain Park area. P.M. “Uncle Button” Nelson, Jack Tucker and William Karr married sisters and moved into the region in 1885. Other early settlers included I.Q. Snow, Hamilton Kimberlin, Michael Mulchay, George Van Sickle, Eugene Sullivan, Fletcher and James Thompson, J.M. Bennett, Venturo Giron, George Wofford, Charlie McClure, Antonio Vargas and Ben Wooten.

They built and maintained ditches to divert the Fresnal Canyon water to their crops and built the first dirt road from Fresnal to La Luz. Fresnal, later known as Wooten, had the first post office in the area, established in 1894.

The coming of the railroad in 1898 opened up the area for the shipment of goods to market and development of the tourist trade. By 1899, trains went as far as Toboggan Canyon, where passengers were transferred to stagecoaches for the final miles to Cloudcroft. Freight depots and Wells Fargo offices were built in both High Rolls and Mountain Park. The railroad operated on a regular basis until World War II. It finally ceased operation in 1948.

The first official use of the High Rolls name was in 1901, when the post office was moved from Fresnal (Wooten) to High Rolls. The name, which was sometimes spelled as one word, Highrolls, supposedly came from the shape and elevation of the area as compared to the sharper peaks higher up.

Mountain Park received its name from Edgar Cadwallader, who came there in 1903 with the intent to grow fruit and vegetables. Others settled in the area and the resulting orchards produced apples, cherries, peaches, pears, cauliflower, and cabbage. It became so successful that the post office was moved there from High Rolls in 1904.

The first store was the High Rolls Mercantile Store, built in 1905, and it is still standing on Railroad Drive in High Rolls to this day. The original area school was a log cabin built in 1889. A school in Haynes Canyon was built in 1908 and the rock school in Karr Canyon was built in 1922 using some of the lumber from the old Haynes Canyon school. Although designed for indoor plumbing none was installed until 1944, because some school board members believed it was unnecessary.

The first church building was constructed of logs in 1888. In 1906, the Fresnal Baptist Church was built in Haynes Canyon. It then became the High Rolls/Mountain Park United Methodist Church, and is currently Mountain Bible Fellowship, now a state historical site.

The High Rolls Development Company was formed in 1909 and built a three-story hotel with 25 rooms, which opened in 1912. The company also constructed about 50 guest cottages for summer visitors. Over the years, the hotel served as a tuberculosis sanitarium and later as a retreat for Jesuit priests. Finally, the hotel was dismantled, with part staying and becoming a private residence while other parts became homes in Alamogordo. Of the 50 cottages, only about six remain, all remodeled and added to, on what was known as Cottage Row. The 160 acre Skyline Ranch of the YMCA was a well-known feature of the region from its start in 1908 as Camp Mescalero until it was sold and became private property in the 1980s.

Probably the best known native of the area is Bill Mauldin, nationally syndicated cartoonist, Pulitzer Prize winner known for his wartime cartoons often featuring Willie and Joe. Mauldin was born and raised in Mountain Park and his first cartoon appeared in the Alamogordo High School newspaper.

The two communities have grown over the years. In 1956, the High Rolls/Mountain Park Post Office was established.

== Education ==
It is zoned to Alamogordo Public Schools. High Rolls/Mount Park Elementary is the zoned elementary school, while Chaparral Middle School is the zoned middle school. Alamogordo High School is the district's comprehensive high school.

La Luz School District consolidated into the Alamogordo district on July 1, 1959.
