= Dell City Independent School District =

School district in Texas

Dell City School
- Dell City School
- Texas; United States

Information
- School type: Public K-12 school
- School district: Dell City Independent School District
- Grades: K-12
- Colors: Royal Blue & White
- Athletics conference: UIL Class A
- Mascot: Cougars/Lady Cougars
- Communities served: Dell City and northeastern Hudspeth County, Texas, and southeastern Otero County, New Mexico (the through an agreement with Alamogordo Public Schools)
- Website: Dell City School

Dell City Independent School District (DCISD) is a public school district based in Dell City, Texas (USA). The district operates Dell City School, which covers grades Kindergarten through 12 and serves students in northern Hudspeth County. Dell City School is classified as a 1A school by the UIL. In 2016, the school was rated "Improvement Required" by the Texas Education Agency. In addition to northern Hudspeth County, it also serves areas of southeast Otero County, New Mexico as part of an inter-district agreement with Alamogordo Public Schools due to the area's lack of proximity to the Alamogordo district's schools.

As of 2007, the Texas State Energy Conservation Office awards Dell City ISD money due to the colonias served by the district.

The district operates Grace Grebing Public Library which also serves as a community library for Dell City. It was named after a longtime teacher (born August 17, 1899 in San Saba, Texas) who became superintendent and principal at the same time while also teaching the 5th grade. She retired in 1973.

== History ==
The first teacher in Dell City, established in 1948, was sent by the Sierra Blanca Independent School District on the request by Dell City area parents. The initial enrollment was 25. Grebing arrived in Dell City on January 1, 1950 and began teaching the population since Sierra Blanca decided not to send another teacher there. The proposed district was to, in addition to a portion of Sierra Blanca ISD, also take a portion of the Allamoore Common School District. The movement to form a Dell City district caused turmoil in board members of Sierra Blanca as they were afraid the loss of population would mean the district would no longer be accredited to teach high school, and the El Paso Times wrote that Sierra Blanca ISD superintendent William F. Wallace "was reported to have resigned because of the controversy." Sierra Blanca ISD officials wanted to bus Dell City students to Sierra Blanca, something the Dell City residents did not want. Dell City residents also stated that Sierra Blanca offered the Dell City ISD an area that was not self-sustaining. In 1951 Sierra Blanca ISD's board voted to have Dell City students sent to Sierra Blanca on a 6-1 basis, prompting Dell City parents to state that they will not send their children to Sierra Blanca.

A three-room facility was built in Dell City after enough money was generated in 1950. A new eight classroom school building, with three wings, was dedicated in 1953. It had a cost of $150,000. Grebing served as the first superintendent until she retired in 1973.

Fabian Gomez, an alumnus of Dell City School, returned to Dell City in 2013 and became its superintendent. He instituted tracking teacher performance and purchased technology to enhance classroom instruction. Jessica Onsurez of the Carlsbad Current-Argus interviewed a town resident who felt that Gomez should not have replaced older teachers with newer ones. Circa 2018 Ruben Cervantes became superintendent. As of the same year Carlos Contreras served as the principal.

== Student body ==
In 2000 the district had 236 students.

Circa 2016 the district had an average of 70 students per year. In 2019 the district had 76 students. In 2016 39% of the students were studying English as a second language and 79% were categorized as economically disadvantaged.

Mallory Falk of KUT 90.5 stated that the district has a "sense of family" compared to other districts.

== Operations ==
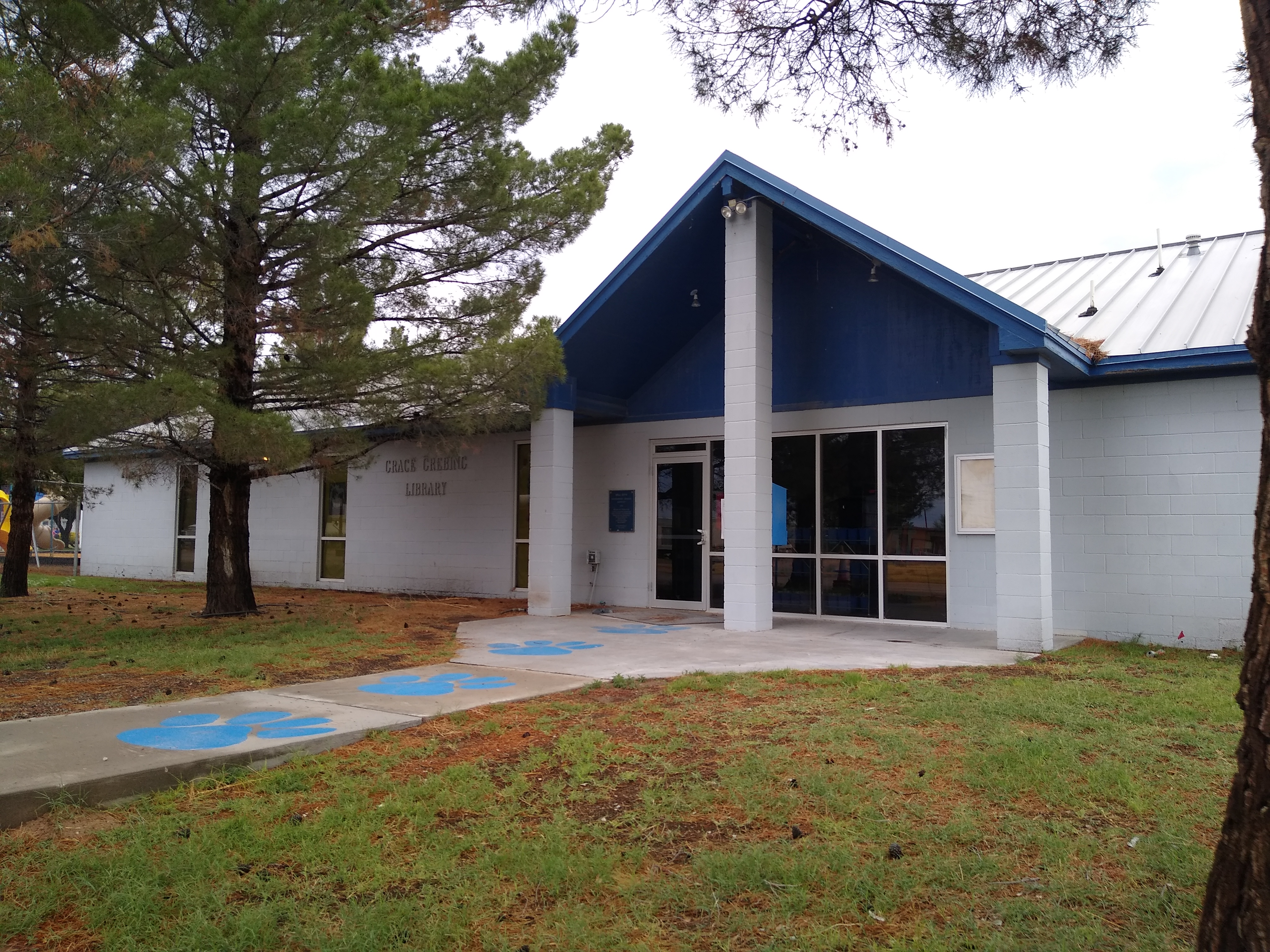
Grace Grebing Library

Typical teachers who are hired are new teachers trying to gain experience, and by the time they have obtained such, due to the relative isolation of Dell City and low pay of Dell City ISD, they move back to their hometowns, most often El Paso, to be hired there. Gomez stated in 2016 that there was only one teacher who had been teaching at Dell City in 2013. Circa 2019, annually about 40% of the teaching staff leaves. The low tax base and enrollment means the district has less money to pay salaries, and teachers hired are often asked to take multiple roles. When the district does not have staff to cover a subject area, students take classes online. The Texas Virtual School Network provides online classes, such as circa 2016 when there was no secondary science teacher.

By 2016 the decreasing student population meant that students rotate between teachers who specialize in particular subjects. Additionally the school combined classes together.

The area of the former Cienega School in unincorporated Otero County, New Mexico is about 20 miles (32 km) from Dell City and about 100 miles (160 km) from Alamogordo, New Mexico; while it is in the Alamogordo Public Schools district boundaries, due to the respective distances the Alamogordo district has an agreement with Dell City ISD so the Dell City district could educate students from the Cienega area. Dell City ISD served grades 9-12 from that area after the opening of Alamogordo district's grade 1-8 Cienega School in 1965. In 1967 the eighth grade was moved to Dell City ISD. In 1970, all grades K-12 were sent to Dell City ISD as Cienega School closed. As of 2020 the agreement is still in place.

== Campus ==
The superintendent's office is located in a former kindergarten classroom.

The district has a residence provided for the superintendent. Additionally by 2018 the district was allowing other teachers to temporarily live in the superintendent's residence while it established dedicated housing for other teachers in unused cottages. By 2019 the district installed additional teacher housing in former portable classrooms; such housing is an effort to retain teachers.

== Athletics ==
Dell City High School competes in these sports -

6-Man Football, Basketball, Tennis, Track and Field, and Volleyball

It had full sized American football teams until around 1989.

Dell City holds the distinction of being the smallest school in Texas that plays football (as of 2021)

== See also ==
- List of school districts in Texas
