= Orogrande, New Mexico =

Orogrande
- CDP
- Location in the United States
- Coordinates: 32°23′15″N 106°06′01″W
- Country: United States
- State: New Mexico
- County: Otero

Area
  - Total: 5.68 sq mi (14.71 km^{2})
  - Land: 5.68 sq mi (14.71 km^{2})
  - Water: 0 sq mi (0.00 km^{2})
- Elevation: 4,282 ft (1,305 m)

Population (2020)
  - Total: 35
  - Density: 6.2/sq mi (2.38/km^{2})
- Time zone: UTC-7
  - Summer (DST): UTC-6 (MDT)
- FIPS code: 35-54500
- GNIS feature ID: 2584170

Orogrande is an unincorporated community in Otero County, New Mexico, United States, located in the Jarilla Mountains of the Tularosa Basin on U.S. 54 between El Paso, Texas and Alamogordo. As of the 2020 census, Orogrande had a population of 35.

== History ==
Originally a mining town named Jarilla Junction due to its proximity to the Jarilla Mountains, established in 1905, the town was renamed Orogrande (Spanish for big gold) in 1906 and is not far from similar mining towns (now completely abandoned ghost towns) named Brice and Ohaysi. The population soared to approximately 2000 as the result of a gold rush that occurred in 1905, but quickly collapsed almost to the point of depopulation when the gold deposits proved much less abundant than expected. There are still numerous abandoned mines in the area which fall under the jurisdiction of the Bureau of Land Management. Other land around Orogrande is part of a military reservation under the control of Fort Bliss.

The town holds the record high temperature in New Mexico, at 116 °F (47 °C).

== Geography ==
=== Climate ===
Climate data for Orogrande, New Mexico (1991–2020)
Month	Jan	Feb	Mar	Apr	May	Jun	Jul	Aug	Sep	Oct	Nov	Dec	Year
Mean daily maximum °F (°C)	59.0 (15.0)	64.4 (18.0)	72.5 (22.5)	79.9 (26.6)	88.3 (31.3)	97.2 (36.2)	96.1 (35.6)	94.3 (34.6)	88.5 (31.4)	79.9 (26.6)	66.2 (19.0)	57.5 (14.2)	78.6 (25.9)
Daily mean °F (°C)	43.9 (6.6)	49.2 (9.6)	56.0 (13.3)	63.1 (17.3)	71.1 (21.7)	80.5 (26.9)	81.6 (27.6)	80.2 (26.8)	74.6 (23.7)	64.2 (17.9)	51.3 (10.7)	43.1 (6.2)	63.2 (17.4)
Mean daily minimum °F (°C)	28.8 (−1.8)	34.0 (1.1)	39.5 (4.2)	46.3 (7.9)	53.9 (12.2)	63.7 (17.6)	67.1 (19.5)	66.0 (18.9)	60.7 (15.9)	48.5 (9.2)	36.5 (2.5)	28.7 (−1.8)	47.8 (8.8)
Average precipitation inches (mm)	0.47 (12)	0.44 (11)	0.28 (7.1)	0.15 (3.8)	0.53 (13)	1.00 (25)	2.45 (62)	2.02 (51)	1.89 (48)	1.00 (25)	0.49 (12)	1.67 (42)	12.39 (311.9)
Average snowfall inches (cm)	0.9 (2.3)	0.1 (0.25)	0.0 (0.0)	0.0 (0.0)	0.0 (0.0)	0.0 (0.0)	0.0 (0.0)	0.0 (0.0)	0.0 (0.0)	0.1 (0.25)	0.0 (0.0)	0.8 (2.0)	1.9 (4.8)
Source: NOAA

== Demographics ==
Historical population
Census	Pop.	Note	%±
2020	35		—
U.S. Decennial Census

== Education ==
It is zoned to Alamogordo Public Schools. Yucca Elementary School is the zoned elementary school, and Mountain View Middle School is the zoned middle school. Alamogordo High School is the district's comprehensive high school.

On July 1, 1959 Orogrande became a part of the Alamogordo school district. At that time elementary students went to school in Orogrande while high school students attended school in Alamogordo. In July 1959 the school district closed the Orogrande school as it felt all students could come to Alamogordo and the district could save money.
