= Cloudcroft Municipal Schools =

School district in New Mexico, United States

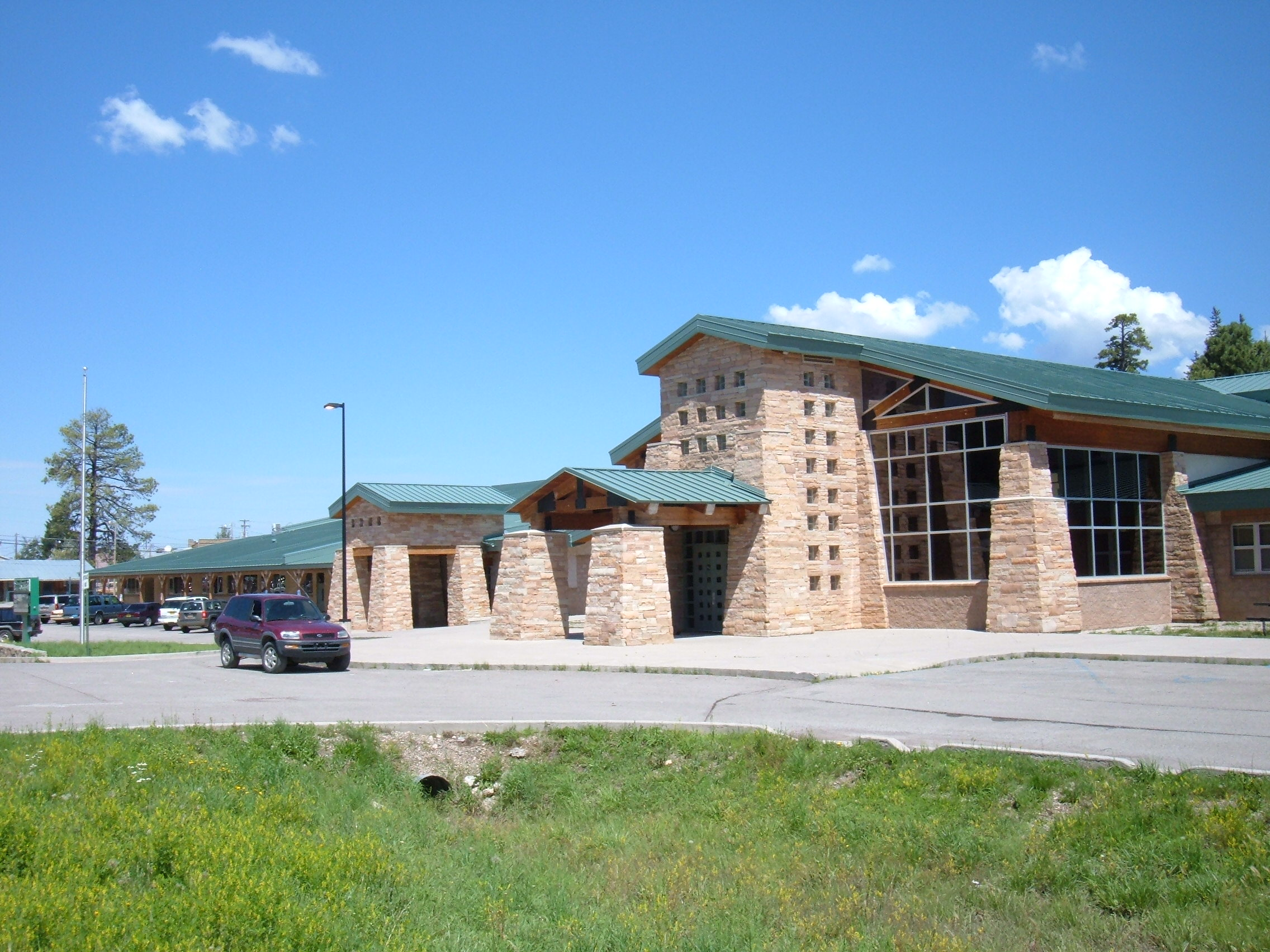
School facility

Cloudcroft Municipal Schools is a school district headquartered in Cloudcroft, New Mexico. It includes Cloudcroft Elementary/Middle School and Cloudcroft High School.

In addition to Cloudcroft it serves Mayhill, Piñon, Sacramento, Timberon, Twin Forks, and Weed. It also serves Duncan, Elk, and Sunspot.

== History ==
In 1958 the Weed and Pinon communities, being moved out of the Otero County Board of Education, chose to join the Alamogordo Public Schools school district. Weed residents believed the Alamogordo district would be more likely to keep their schools open if there was an enrollment decrease, so they opted for Alamogordo schools instead of Cloudcroft schools. The Cloudcroft school board disliked the decision and in 1958 passed a motion stating that the district should not accept Weed or Piñon students even if their respective areas offered to pay tuition to Cloudcroft schools.

In 1991 the Alamogordo board voted to close Weed High School. It made a deal with Cloudcroft schools to have the Weed High children sent to Cloudcroft Schools. Some Weed residents did not like the deal as they perceived Cloudcroft schools to be too large and because the Cloudcroft area catered to tourists. Because Weed Elementary remained as a part of the Alamogordo district, it meant that the elementary and high school students had different scheduling. The Cloudcroft district did not begin charging tuition to Alamogordo schools and relied on increased funding from its higher enrollment. The Cloudcroft board in 1991 ignored the 1958 resolution that stated the district should not accept Weed and Piñon students.

In August 1992 Weed Elementary parents protesting the retention of a teacher they disliked chose to enroll their children in Cloudcroft schools instead as a form of protest, and the Cloudcroft district accepted them. In fall 1992 Weed Elementary officially closed, and at that point all grade levels K-12 in the Weed area were officially to be sent to Cloudcroft schools.

In November 1992 the Cloudcroft district's board passed a resolution to annex portions of the Alamogordo district, including Pinon, Timberon, and Weed, as well as several ranches. In a separate motion the district drew new electoral boundaries with the annexed area effective the approval of said annexation.

Upon receiving the Timberon area, the Cloudcroft district continued to operate the Little Red School House, a winter-only elementary facility in Timberon which it acquired from the Alamogordo district, until May 26, 2002.
