= Dell City, Texas =

- City
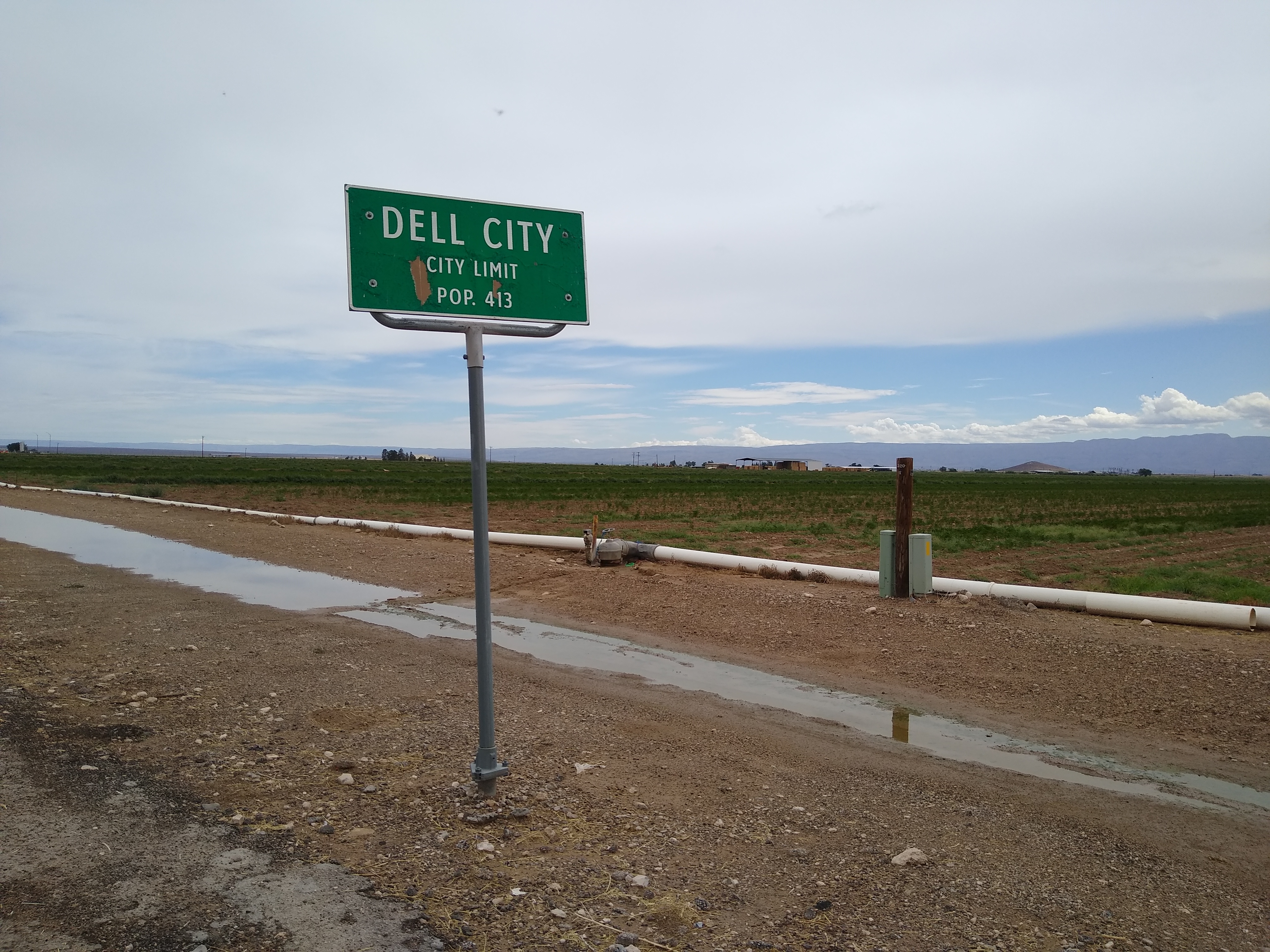
- Sign indicating the city limits

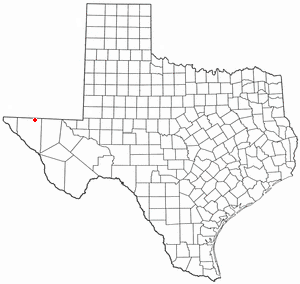
- Location of Dell City, Texas

- Coordinates: 31°56′06″N 105°11′59″W
- Country: United States
- State: Texas
- County: Hudspeth

Area
  - Total: 1.67 sq mi (4.32 km^{2})
  - Land: 1.67 sq mi (4.32 km^{2})
  - Water: 0 sq mi (0.00 km^{2})
- Elevation: 3,698 ft (1,127 m)

Population (2020)
  - Total: 245
  - Density: 147/sq mi (56.7/km^{2})
- Time zone: UTC-7 (Mountain (MST))
  - Summer (DST): UTC-6 (MDT)
- ZIP code: 79837
- Area code: 915
- FIPS code: 48-19708
- GNIS feature ID: 2410318
- Website: www.dellcity.com

Dell City is a city in Hudspeth County, Texas, United States. The population was 365 at the time of the 2010 census, down from 413 at the time of the 2000 census. The population is now at 245 by the 2020 census. It is near the former location of Paulville, a failed Ron Paul-inspired Libertarian cooperative and planned community.

The city was incorporated in 1948, shortly after the discovery of an underground water supply by oil prospectors, which attracted farmers to the area. Its name is a reference to the nursery rhyme "The Farmer in the Dell."

== History ==
Dell City was established in 1948, as an aquifer had been found in the area. Settlers came from other areas of Texas and New Mexico. It developed into being a farming town. The community had about 500 people in the 1950s.

In 2012, Jeanne Catsoulis of The New York Times described Dell City as "a borderline ghost town". In 2014, there were 336 people, according to the United States Census Bureau, with 50 being the average age. In 2016, Jessica Onsurez wrote that residents in the town, which had a decline in the number of businesses, are divided over whether the town is "dying", in her words, or whether it will rebound. Residents rejected proposals to establish a prison and a manufacturing plant.

== Geography ==
Dell City is located in northeastern Hudspeth County in West Texas. It is 13 miles (21 km) north of U.S. Routes 62 and 180, and 4 miles (6 km) south of the New Mexico border. The Guadalupe Mountains are visible to the east.

According to the United States Census Bureau, the city has a total area of 1.7 square miles (4.3 km^{2}), all land.

It is approximately 90 miles (140 km) from El Paso, which is west of Dell City. Carlsbad, New Mexico, to the northeast, is 90 miles (140 km) away.

It is about 20 miles (32 km) west of the Guadalupe Mountains National Park. Texas Highways states that it is about 45 minutes' travel time away.

=== Climate ===
Climate data for Dell City, Texas
| Month | Jan | Feb | Mar | Apr | May | Jun | Jul | Aug | Sep | Oct | Nov | Dec | Year |
|---|---|---|---|---|---|---|---|---|---|---|---|---|---|
| Record high °F (°C) | 81 (27) | 87 (31) | 93 (34) | 101 (38) | 108 (42) | 115 (46) | 112 (44) | 108 (42) | 105 (41) | 101 (38) | 90 (32) | 79 (26) | 115 (46) |
| Mean daily maximum °F (°C) | 60.0 (15.6) | 64.8 (18.2) | 72.7 (22.6) | 80.8 (27.1) | 89.4 (31.9) | 97.6 (36.4) | 97.3 (36.3) | 94.9 (34.9) | 88.8 (31.6) | 80.5 (26.9) | 68.4 (20.2) | 59.3 (15.2) | 79.5 (26.4) |
| Mean daily minimum °F (°C) | 25.4 (−3.7) | 30.0 (−1.1) | 35.6 (2.0) | 42.9 (6.1) | 52.6 (11.4) | 60.9 (16.1) | 64.8 (18.2) | 63.5 (17.5) | 56.2 (13.4) | 44.4 (6.9) | 32.2 (0.1) | 25.6 (−3.6) | 44.5 (6.9) |
| Record low °F (°C) | 3 (−16) | −9 (−23) | 11 (−12) | 20 (−7) | 32 (0) | 44 (7) | 53 (12) | 50 (10) | 34 (1) | 21 (−6) | 9 (−13) | −5 (−21) | −9 (−23) |
| Average precipitation inches (mm) | 0.43 (11) | 0.59 (15) | 0.28 (7.1) | 0.27 (6.9) | 0.89 (23) | 0.94 (24) | 1.48 (38) | 1.89 (48) | 1.74 (44) | 0.99 (25) | 0.54 (14) | 0.52 (13) | 10.55 (268) |
Source: The Western Regional Climate Center

== Economy ==
As of 2019, the major sectors were farming and ranching. There were multiple farms owned by families and two cotton gins that provided employment. By 2016, the number of farms had declined. By 2019, several alfalfa growing operations were established and several persons from the Mesilla Valley and the area around Hatch, New Mexico began growing chile peppers on leased land around Dell City.

In 1979, there were three grocery stores and four bars. By 1989, there was only one grocery and general store, Dell City Mercantile, which had burned down in a fire that year. There were also three bars, two gas stations, two restaurants, a hardware store, and a video rental business. In 2016, the city had one grocery store, Two T's Grocery, in a former bar, and one multipurpose store, the Dell City Mercantile. Additionally as of that year there were two restaurants, Spanish Angel Cafe, and Rosita's Cafe.

By 2019, a business owner began operating an Airbnb from several previously disused buildings.

== Healthcare ==
In 1989, there was one doctor who had office hours on Wednesdays in Dell City, but otherwise townfolk had to travel to El Paso to get medical appointments. As of 1989, the closest hospital was in El Paso. As of now there is only an Emergency Services District tasked with dealing with medical emergencies.

== Townscape ==
There are no traffic lights in town. Several of the buildings are in an adobe style. As it was established in the 20th century, it lacks prior architecture found in other small towns in Texas. The late Laura Lynch, a member of the original Dixie Chicks, tasked herself with rehabilitating historical architecture.

== Education ==
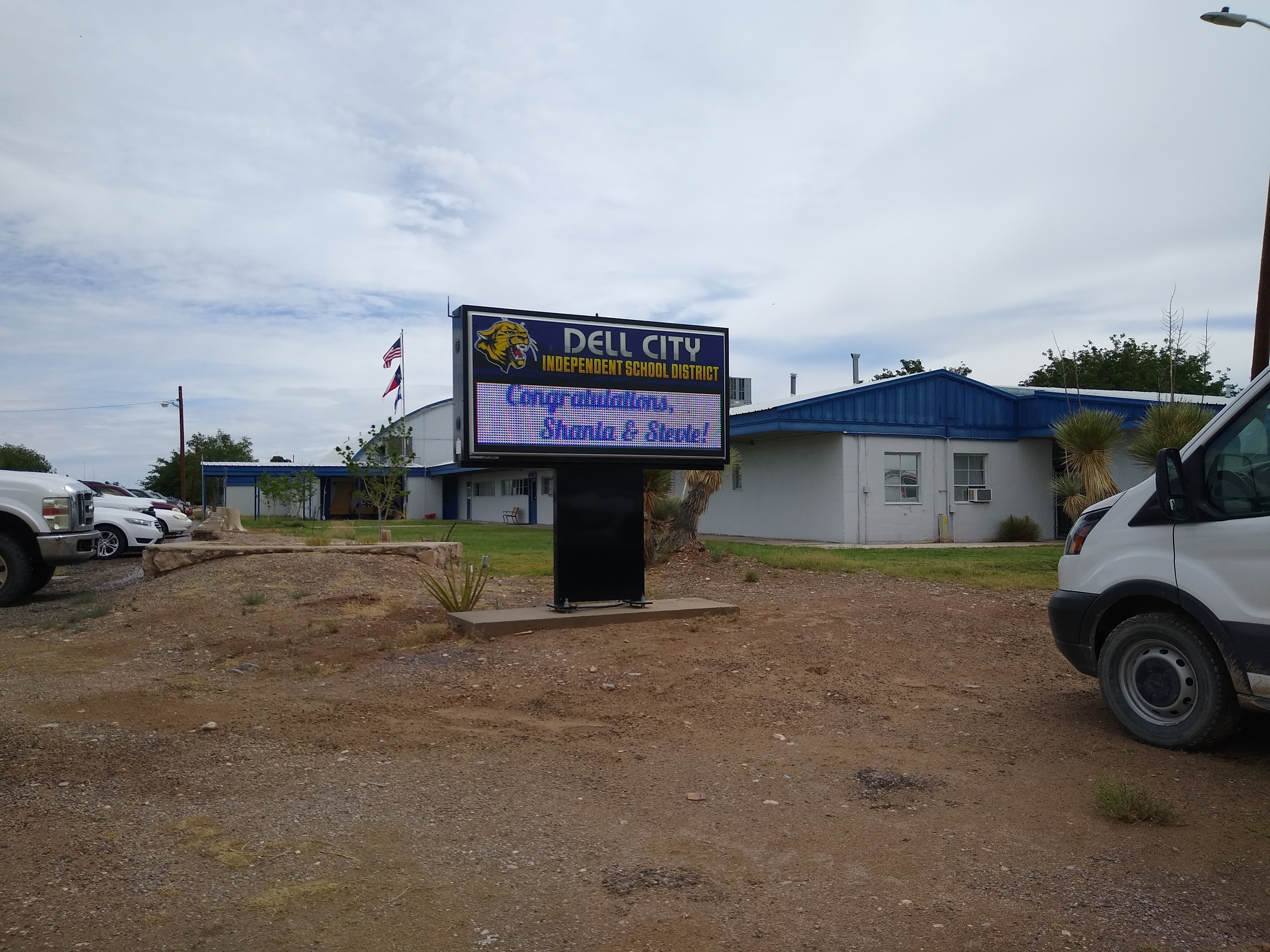
Dell City School

The area is served by the Dell City Independent School District, one of the smallest school districts in the state. The district has just one school, covering grades kindergarten through 12. In 1949, a teacher from Sierra Blanca Independent School District was sent to Dell City on request by Dell City residents, and another teacher, Grace Grebing, took over the role in 1950; she became the first superintendent of Dell City ISD.

The district operates Grace Grebing Public Library, which also serves as a community library for Dell City. It was named after a longtime teacher.

Hudspeth County is within the official service area of El Paso Community College.

== Demographics ==
Historical population
| Census | Pop. | Note | %± |
|---|---|---|---|
| 1970 | 383 | | — |
| 1980 | 495 | | 29.2% |
| 1990 | 569 | | 14.9% |
| 2000 | 413 | | −27.4% |
| 2010 | 365 | | −11.6% |
| 2020 | 245 | | −32.9% |
U.S. Decennial Census

=== 2020 census ===
As of the 2020 census, Dell City had a population of 245. The median age was 50.5 years. 11.0% of residents were under the age of 18 and 25.3% of residents were 65 years of age or older. For every 100 females there were 118.8 males, and for every 100 females age 18 and over there were 107.6 males age 18 and over.

0.0% of residents lived in urban areas, while 100.0% lived in rural areas.

There were 108 households in Dell City, of which 32.4% had children under the age of 18 living in them. Of all households, 43.5% were married-couple households, 25.0% were households with a male householder and no spouse or partner present, and 28.7% were households with a female householder and no spouse or partner present. About 26.9% of all households were made up of individuals and 12.0% had someone living alone who was 65 years of age or older.

There were 165 housing units, of which 34.5% were vacant. The homeowner vacancy rate was 9.2% and the rental vacancy rate was 0.0%.

Racial composition as of the 2020 census
| Race | Number | Percent |
|---|---|---|
| White | 130 | 53.1% |
| Black or African American | 1 | 0.4% |
| American Indian and Alaska Native | 8 | 3.3% |
| Asian | 0 | 0.0% |
| Native Hawaiian and Other Pacific Islander | 0 | 0.0% |
| Some other race | 56 | 22.9% |
| Two or more races | 50 | 20.4% |
| Hispanic or Latino (of any race) | 149 | 60.8% |

=== 2000 census ===
As of the census of 2000, 413 people, 155 households, and 119 families resided in the city. The population density was 250.1 inhabitants per square mile (96.6/km^{2}). The 226 housing units averaged 136.9 per square mile (52.9/km^{2}). The racial makeup of the city was 61.50% White, 1.45% African American, 1.94% Native American, 0.24% Asian, 32.69% from other races, and 2.18% from two or more races. Hispanic or Latinos of any race were 69.25% of the population.

Of the 155 households, 36.8% had children under the age of 18 living with them, 63.9% were married couples living together, 11.6% had a female householder with no husband present, and 22.6% were not families. About 20.6% of all households were made up of individuals, and 7.7% had someone living alone who was 65 years of age or older. The average household size was 2.66 and the average family size was 3.11.

In the city, the population was distributed as 30.5% under the age of 18, 6.3% from 18 to 24, 21.8% from 25 to 44, 28.1% from 45 to 64, and 13.3% who were 65 years of age or older. The median age was 37 years. For every 100 females, there were 105.5 males. For every 100 females age 18 and over, there were 95.2 males.

The median income for a household in the city was $19,602, and for a family was $21,667. Males had a median income of $24,135 versus $18,571 for females. The per capita income for the city was $9,580. About 26.4% of families and 29.4% of the population were below the poverty line, including 33.1% of those under age 18 and 38.6% of those age 65 or over.

== Media ==
The Dell Valley Review began publication in Dell City in 1956. It became known as the Hudspeth County Herald in 1964. Its offices are now in Odessa. The publication maintains a mailing address PO Box in Fort Hancock. The full name is Hudspeth County Herald and Dell Valley Review. In 2012 the newspaper had one employee, who served as the editor.

== In culture ==
The filmmaker Josh Carter, beginning in 2002, assisted the creation of four films created by natives of Dell City, and he spliced them into a single work called Tales from Dell City, Texas, released in 2012. Catsoulis wrote that the film "immortalizes a dusty slice of vanishing Americana, delivering a parched ode to hard work, endurance and desert dreams."

== Notable people ==
- Laura Lynch, founder and member of the original Dixie Chicks

== Gallery ==
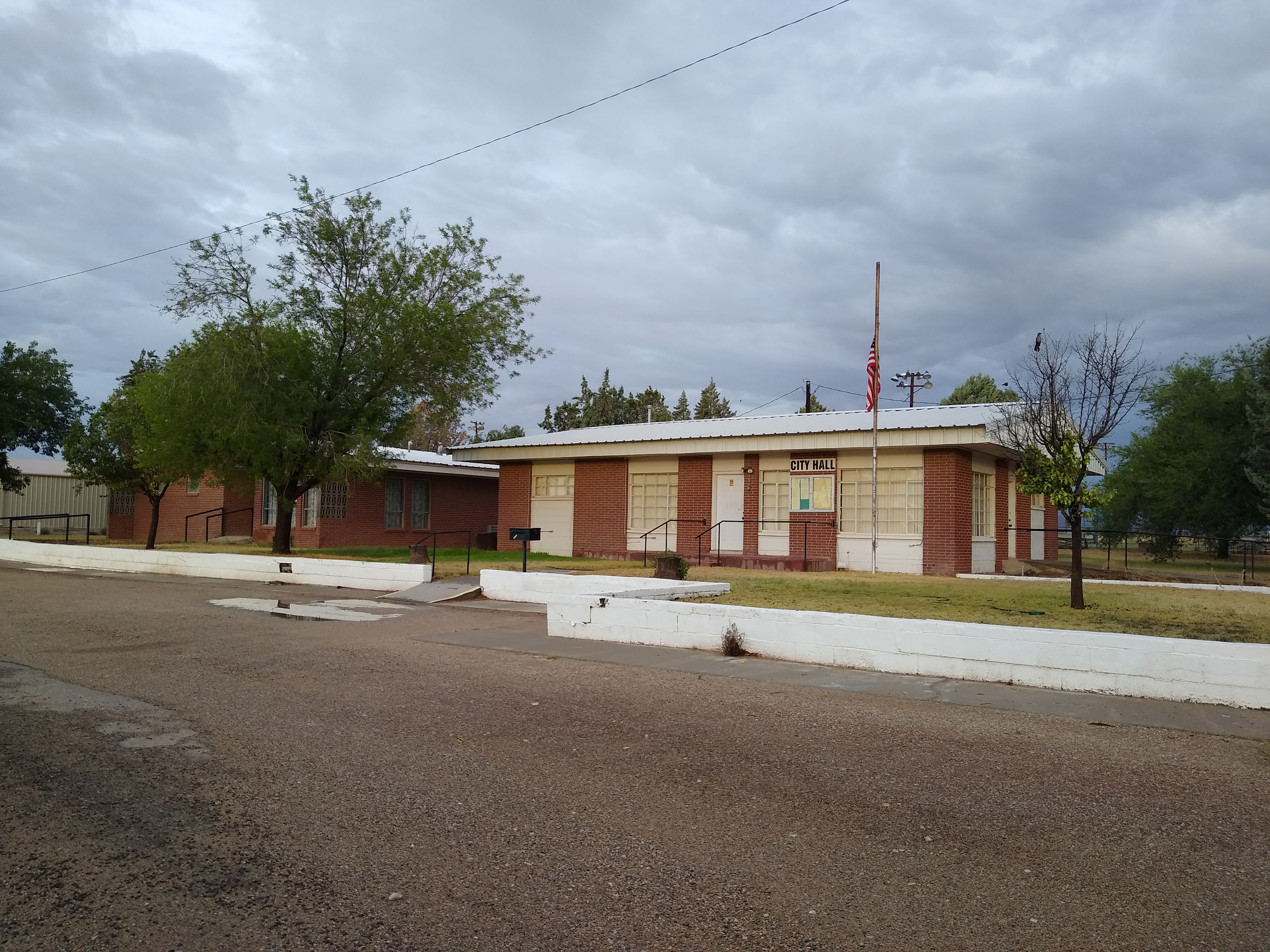
City hall

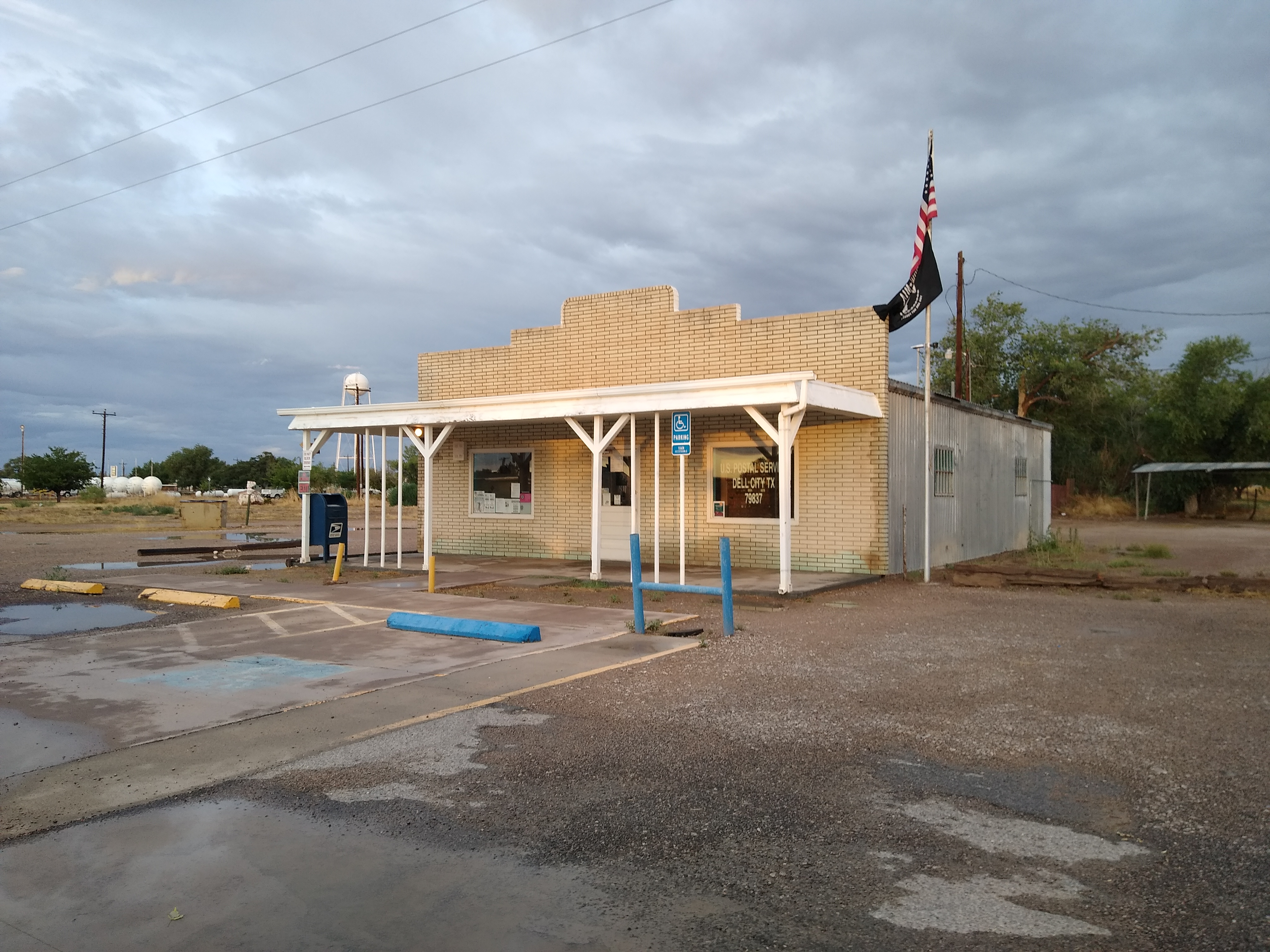
Post office

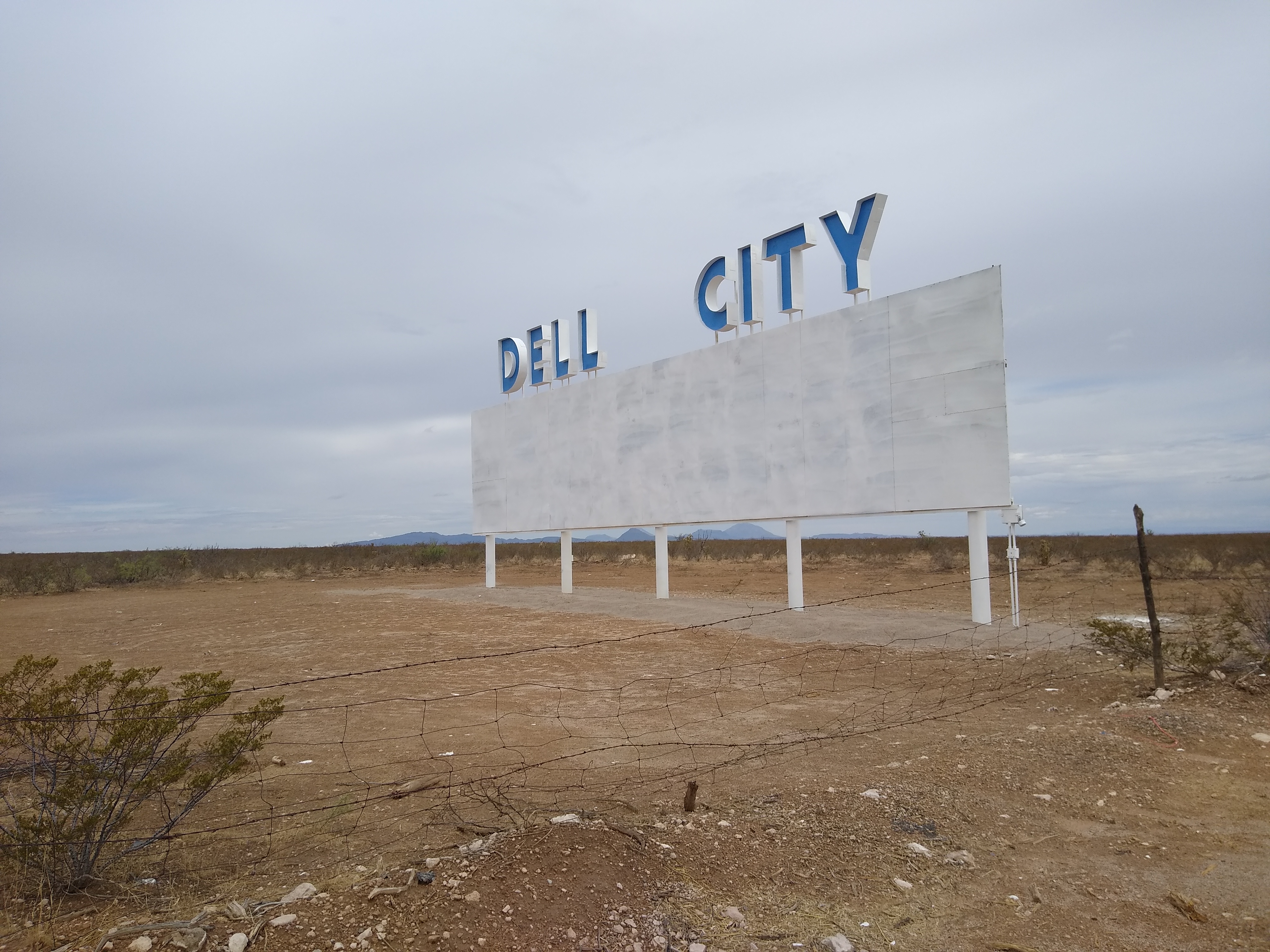
Sign for Dell City at Dell City Junction (south of Dell City, U.S. Highway 62 at FM 1437)
