= List of bridges on the National Register of Historic Places in New Mexico =

See also List of bridges in New Mexico

This is a list of bridges and tunnels on the National Register of Historic Places in the U.S. state of New Mexico.

Name	Image	Built	Listed	Location	County	Type
Apache Canyon Railroad Bridge		1892	1979-04-27	Lamy	Santa Fe	Deck Plate Girder Bridge
Bridge A 249		1899	2015-12-29	Cloudcroft; 32°57′35.6″N 105°44′55.5″W	Otero	Wooden trestle
Delgado Street Bridge		1927, 1928	2015-08-03	Santa Fe; 35°41′04.0″N 105°55′52.1″W	Santa Fe	Reinforced concrete deck-girder
Don Gaspar Bridge		1934	2002-10-16	Santa Fe; 35°41′6″N 105°56′22″W	Santa Fe	
El Puente de Los Hidalgos		1920	2001-07-25	Santa Fe; 35°41′34.2″N 105°56′22.1″W	Santa Fe	Concrete tied-arch
Fort Sumner Railroad Bridge		1905, 1906	1979-03-21	Fort Sumner; 34°29′6″N 104°15′31″W	De Baca	Plate-girder design
Green Bridge		1943	2008-08-21	Las Cruces	Doña Ana County	Pratt through truss
Mexican Canyon Trestle	Mexican Canyon Trestle	1899	1979-05-07	Cloudcroft; 32.963734°N 105.747675°W	Otero	
Otowi Suspension Bridge	Otowi Suspension Bridge	1924, 1948	1997-07-15	San Ildefonso; 35°52′29″N 106°8′29″W	Santa Fe	suspension bridge
Pecos River Bridge at Terrero		1921, 1944	1997-07-15	Terrero; 35°44′26″N 105°40′40″W	San Miguel	Howe type timber truss
Percha Creek Bridge	Percha Creek Bridge	1927	1997-07-15	Hillsboro; 32°55′00″N 107°36′21″W	Sierra	Warren type steel deck truss bridge, removed from service in 1995 but preserved
Felix Bridge at Hagerman		1926	1997-07-15	Hagerman; 33°7′51″N 104°20′9″W	Chaves	Pratt through truss bridge
Rio Grande Bridge at Radium Springs	Rio Grande Bridge at Radium Springs	1933	1997-07-15	Radium Springs; 32°29′9″N 106°55′28″W	Doña Ana	timber beam bridge
Rio Grande Bridge at San Juan Pueblo		1925	1997-08-14	Alcalde; 36°3′22″N 106°5′35″W	Rio Arriba	Parker pony truss
Rio Grande Gorge Bridge		1965	1997-07-15	Taos; 36°28′34″N 105°43′56″W	Taos	steel deck truss
Rio Puerco Bridge		1933	1997-07-15	Albuquerque; 35°2′0″N 106°56′29″W	Bernalillo	Parker through truss bridge
San Juan River Bridge at Shiprock		1937	1997-07-15	Shiprock; 36.781277°N 108.692046°W	San Juan	Six-span Parker through truss bridge
Variadero Bridge		ca. 1915	1997-07-22	Variadero; 35°23′21″N 104°27′33″W	San Miguel	Concrete pony truss bridge
Wills Canyon Spur Trestle			1991-12-31	Cloudcroft	Otero	

== See also ==
- List of bridges in New Mexico
