= Alamogordo and Sacramento Mountain Railway =

Railway line in New Mexico, United States

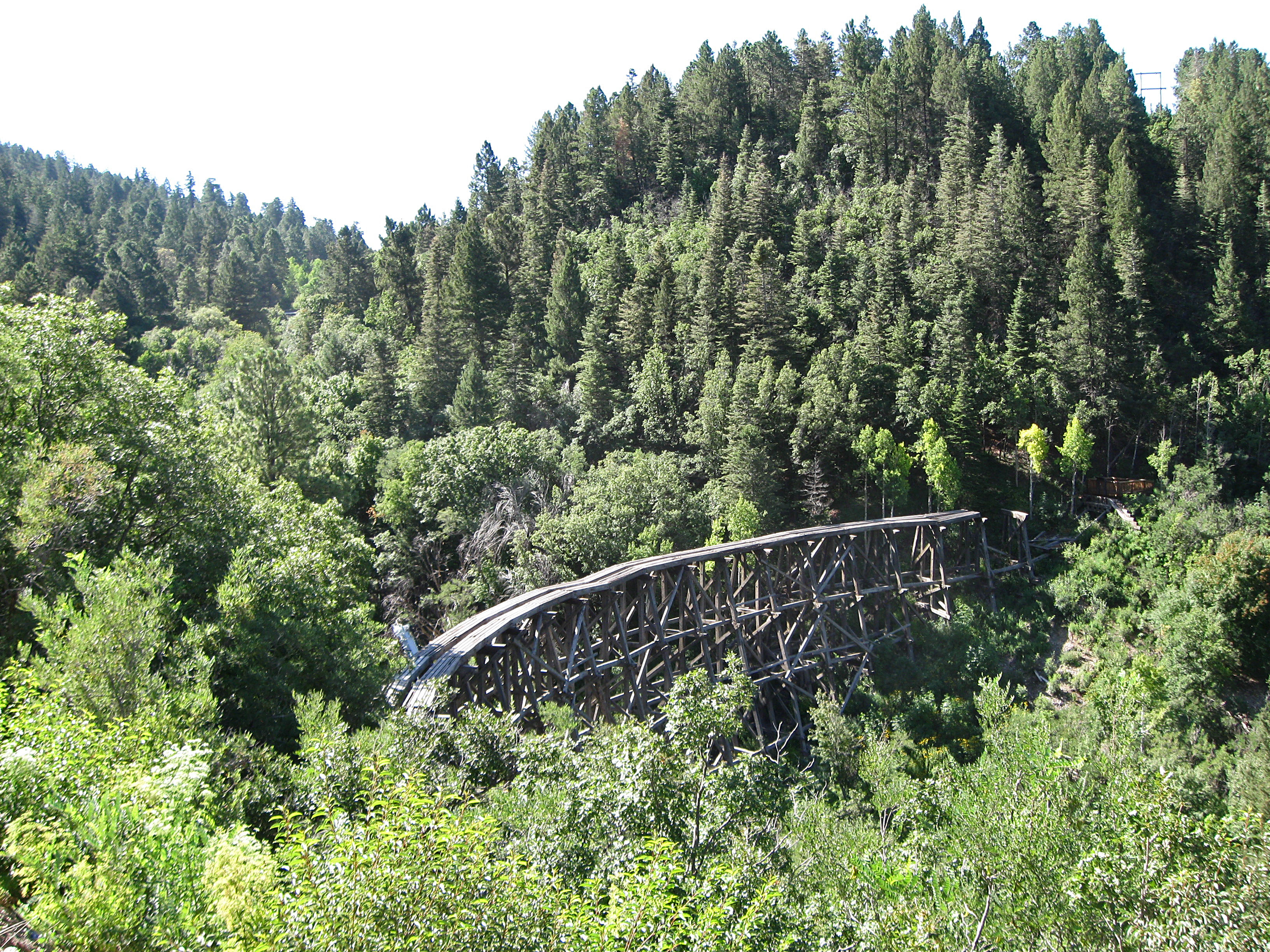
- The Mexican Canyon Trestle near Cloudcroft

Overview
- Locale: Territory of New Mexico
- Dates of operation: 1898–1948
- Successor: El Paso and Southwestern Railroad; Phelps Dodge El Paso and Southwestern Railroad (1905); Southern Pacific Railroad (1924)

Technical
- Track gauge: 4 ft 8 1/2 in (1,435 mm) standard gauge
- Length: 32 mi (51 km)

The Alamogordo and Sacramento Mountain Railway was built as a branch line for the El Paso and Northeastern Railway (EP&NE). Construction began from the EP&NE connection at Alamogordo, New Mexico, in 1898 to reach the Sacramento Mountain fir and spruce forests to the east. Sawmills were built in Alamogordo to mill lumber for extension of the EP&NE to reach the Chicago, Rock Island and Pacific Railroad. The railroad reached Cloudcroft, New Mexico, in 1900, where a lodge was built for summer tourists to enjoy the cool mountain air. Cloudcroft was laid out in several villages so tourists might avoid associating too closely with loggers and railway workers. The railway was extended from Cloudcroft to the small community of Russia, New Mexico, in 1903; and several branches were built to reach timber for the Alamogordo Lumber Company.

Climbing from the Tularosa Basin of the later Trinity Test Site and White Sands Missile Range into the Sacramento Mountain fault block escarpments required numerous trestles, switchbacks and grades as steep as 6.4 %. The work was supervised by Horace Sumner, whose experience in Colorado included construction of the Denver and Rio Grande Western Railroad and the Florence and Cripple Creek Railroad. The result has been described as a standard gauge railroad built to narrow gauge standards. It was one of the most spectacular railroads of the American west.

Milepost	Station	Elevation
0	Alamogordo	4,320 feet (1,320 m)
6	La Luz	4,836 feet (1,474 m)
15.8	High Rolls	6,550 feet (2,000 m)
	Wooten	7,111 feet (2,167 m)
20.6	Toboggan	7,728 feet (2,355 m)
26.2	Cloudcroft	8,600 feet (2,600 m)
32	Russia	9,076 feet (2,766 m)

The climb began in La Luz Canyon and reached Fresnel Canyon using trestles and two 36-degree curves. It climbed into Salado Canyon through a double horseshoe of 30-degree curves on a 4.2 percent grade to reach High Rolls. From Toboggan the line used a switchback with two trestles on a 22-degree curve with a 6 percent grade. The first trestle was 108 feet (33 m) and the second was 200 feet (61 m). The line then crossed Bailey's Canyon over a 30-degree curve on a 198 feet (60 m) trestle and a 28-degree curve on a 261-foot (80 m) trestle. The following 323-foot (98 m) trestle 52 feet (16 m) over Mexican Canyon still stands as a historic landmark. The final canyon before Cloudcroft required a 338-foot (103 m) trestle 41 feet (12 m) high supporting two 30-degree reverse curves. The climb to Cloudcroft was scheduled to take 2 hours and 50 minutes, and the descent back to Alamogordo took 2 hours and 25 minutes. As many as five daily excursion trains from El Paso, Texas, (with a $3 fare in 1907) were scheduled through the summer months, and one or two daily round trips provided passenger and mail service through the winter.

The line became part of the Phelps Dodge El Paso and Southwestern Railroad in 1905 and was leased by Southern Pacific Railroad in 1924. Summer excursions from El Paso were discontinued in 1930 and passenger and mail service ended in 1938. Freight service ended in 1947 and the line was dismantled through the summer of 1948, one half century after it had been built. The railroad owned one combine car, four open-sided excursion cars, and five cabooses in addition to the five wood-burning locomotives listed below. Additional 2-8-0s were used during Phelps Dodge control; and the Southern Pacific roster included 107 logging flatcars formerly owned by the lumber companies.

== Locomotives ==
Number	Type	Builder	Works number	Date	Notes
99	4-truck Shay locomotive	Lima	1893	8/1907	Built as Norfolk and Western #1 renumbered # 56. To EP&SW 5 April 1917. Too large for track. Sold to Red River Lumber Company, California in 1920
101	2-8-2 Tank locomotive	Baldwin	16103	8/1898	rebuilt as Southern Pacific class SE-1 0-8-0 # 1300; scrapped 1934
102	2-4-2 Tank locomotive	Baldwin	13361	3/1893	built for the World's Columbian Exposition; became Phelps Dodge subsidiary Ferrocarril Nacozari # 25 in 1906
103	2-8-0	Baldwin	16494	3/1899	sold as Cloudcroft Lumber and Land Company # 1 in 1924 and became George E. Breece Lumber Company # 1 in 1926
104	2-8-0	Baldwin	17107	11/1899	became Southern Pacific class C-14 # 2504; scrapped 1935
105	4-truck Shay locomotive	Lima	673	3/1902	sold as Ferrocarril Mexicano # 110 in 1905

In addition to the above-listed locomotives owned by the Alamogordo and Sacramento Mountain Railway main line, the following lumber company Shay locomotives operated over logging branches:

Number	Owner	Builder	Works number	Date	Notes
1	Alamogordo Lumber Company	Lima	483	4/1895	built for C.M. Carrier of Pennsylvania; became Sacramento Mountain Lumber Company # 1 in 1918 and Southwest Lumber Company # 2 in 1920
2	Alamogordo Lumber Company	Lima	568	3/1899	became Sacramento Mountain Lumber Company # 2 in 1918 and Southwest Lumber Company # 3 in 1920
3	Alamogordo Lumber Company	Lima	580	9/1899	became Sacramento Mountain Lumber Company # 3 in 1918 and Southwest Lumber Company # 4 in 1920
4	Alamogordo Lumber Company	Lima	587	11/1899	became Sacramento Mountain Lumber Company # 4 in 1918 and was scrapped following a boiler explosion
5	Alamogordo Lumber Company	Lima	700	6/1902	became Sacramento Mountain Lumber Company # 5 in 1918 and Southwest Lumber Company # 5 in 1920
1	Southwest Lumber Company	Lima	3155	9/1921	
3	George E. Breece Lumber Company	Lima	2321	5/1910	built as Zuni Mountain # 3; moved from Thoreau, New Mexico, in 1929
10	George E. Breece Lumber Company	Lima	2027	12/1907	built as Zuni Mountain # 10; moved from Thoreau in 1929
	George E. Breece Lumber Company	Lima	2611	1/1913	built for Grayling Lumber Company of Arkansas
