= Bridge A 249 =

- Bridge A 249-Cloudcroft, New Mexico
- U.S. National Register of Historic Places
- Location within New Mexico
- Nearest city: 65 E. Little Mexican Ave., near Cloudcroft, New Mexico
- Coordinates: 32°57′35.6″N 105°44′55.5″W
- Area: less than one acre
- Architectural style: Trestle bridge
- MPS: Historic Highway Bridges of New Mexico MPS
- NRHP reference No.: 15000948
- Added to NRHP: December 29, 2015

Bridge A 249 is a historic wooden trestle bridge in New Mexico's Sacramento Mountains, Otero County, New Mexico, just outside Cloudcroft, New Mexico. It was listed on the National Register of Historic Places in 2015 as Bridge A 249-Cloudcroft, New Mexico.

It is a very small trestle bridge, relative to the Mexico Canyon Railroad Trestle a short ways away, which has a viewpoint from the highway. This one has just three small spans: a central span resting on wooden supports and two approach spans.

It is a single-tier wood-frame trestle which was part of the Alamogordo & Sacramento Mountains Railroad, a railroad that operated from 1899 to 1947. The railroad had about 26 miles (42 km) of track connecting Alamogordo, New Mexico to spruce and fir timber areas in the Sacramento Mountains.

This trestle is one of seven trestles surviving out of 51 built by the railroad. It was deemed significant "in the area of engineering because it is a representative design by Chief Engineer H. A. Sumner of small trestles required to continue the rail line over small drainages in the upper elevations of the A&SM Railroad."

It is located west of U.S. Route 82, northwest of Cloudcroft, New Mexico
