= United States Post Office and Customs House–Douglas Main =

- US Post Office and Customs House--Douglas Main
- U.S. National Register of Historic Places
- U.S. Historic district – Contributing property
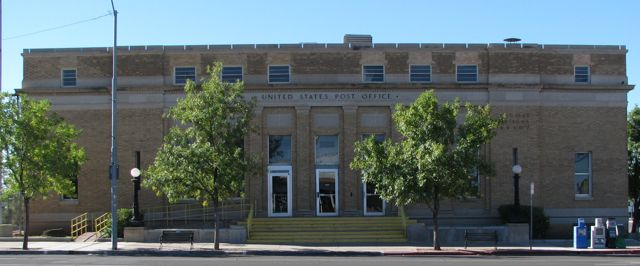

- Location within Arizona Location within the United States
- Location: 601 Tenth St., Douglas, Arizona
- Coordinates: 31°20′41″N 109°33′10″W
- Area: 0.5 acres (0.20 ha)
- Built: 1915
- Built by: Grant Fee
- Architect: Wetmore, James A.
- Architectural style: Beaux Arts
- Part of: Douglas Historic District (ID85000146)
- MPS: Historic US Post Offices in Arizona, 1900--1941, TR
- NRHP reference No.: 85003104

Significant dates
- Added to NRHP: December 3, 1985
- Designated {{{NRHP_TYPE}}}: January 31, 1985

The U.S. Post Office and Customs House-Douglas Main, also known as Douglas Post Office and Customs House or Douglas Main Post Office, is a Beaux-Arts building in Douglas, Arizona that was designed in 1912 and built in 1915. The building provided spaces for a post office, a custom house and Federal offices.

It was listed on the National Register of Historic Places (NRHP) in 1985. The NRHP nomination reports that the building is the most important example of Neo-Classical design in Douglas, and that the town's obtaining this as its first Federal building was important to the city. The securing of funding for the building, its site selection, and its completion were major local events.

It is a contributing building in the Douglas Historic District.

== See also ==
- List of United States post offices
