= El Paso and Southwestern Railroad Passenger Depot-Douglas =

- U.S. National Register of Historic Places
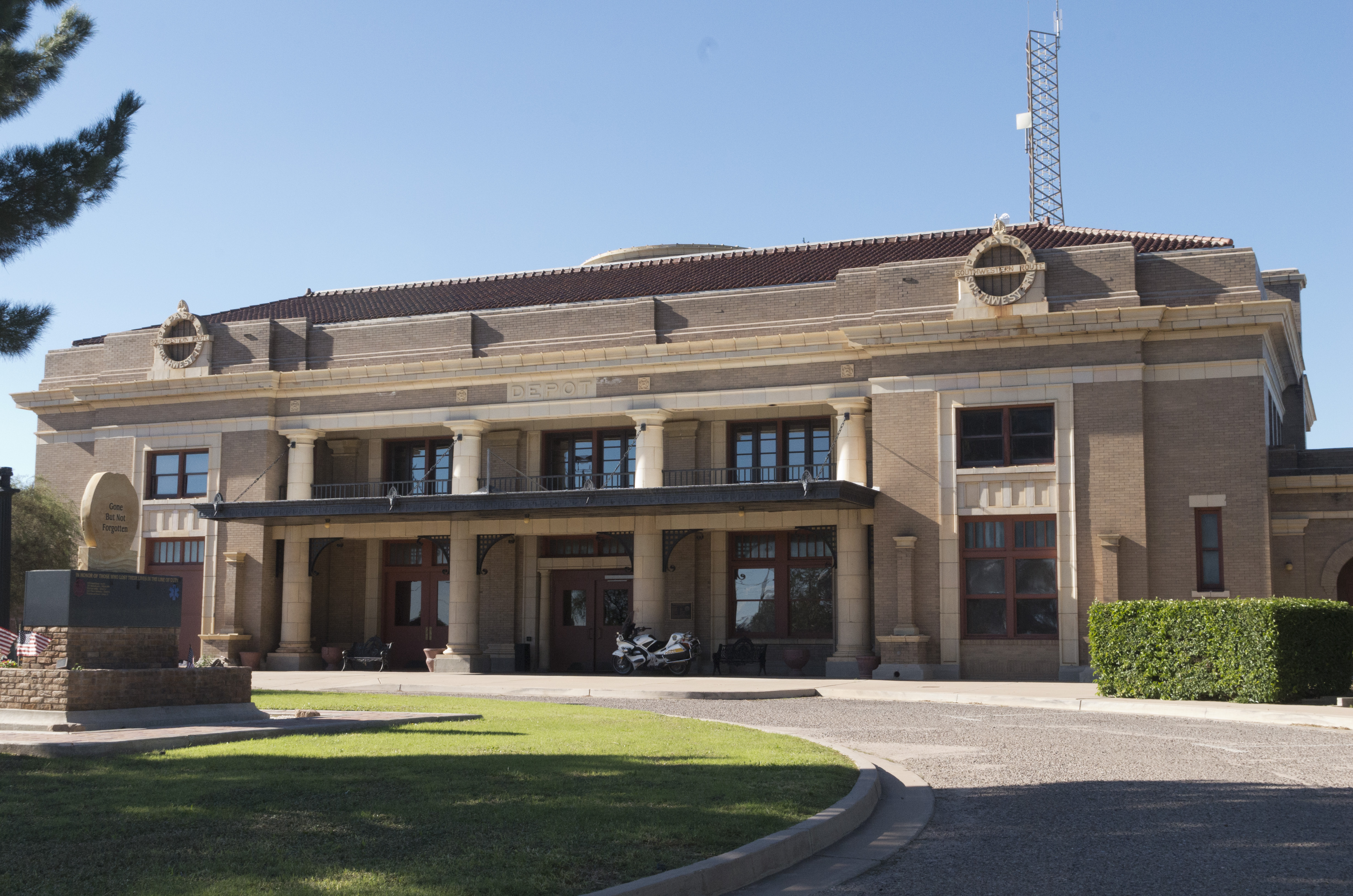

- Location within Arizona Location within the United States
- Location: 300 14th Street, Douglas, Arizona
- Coordinates: 31°20′58″N 109°33′21″W
- NRHP reference No.: 86000792
- Added to NRHP: April 16, 1986

The El Paso and Southwestern Railroad Depot is a Beaux Arts building constructed in 1913 in Douglas, Arizona. Two-stories tall, it was a major station on the El Paso and Southwestern Railroad line. It is slightly to the northwest of the Douglas Historic District, sitting on a 3.2331 acre parcel. Its grounds include fountains and a period taxi stand.

== History ==
With the expansion of the mining industry in Arizona in the 1880s, there became a need to transport the ore to markets more efficiently. After the town of Douglas, Arizona was formed in 1900 by the Phelps-Dodge Corporation, the company also established the El Paso and Southwestern Railroad (E.P.S.W.) to handle the shipment of their ore. The new rail line was expanded throughout southwest Arizona, and in 1913 the new depot at Douglas was opened. During the 1910s, 1920s and 1930s, the depot was the focal point for passenger traffic along the United States-Mexico border. The passenger service served the public of all social/economic classes.

The railroad had a large impact on Douglas' development. In addition to mineral ore, which accounted for the vast majority of the freight of the line, the rail also carried cattle from many of the ranches in the area. It also established a connection between Douglas and El Paso, Texas. In 1924 Phelps Dodge sold the railway to the Southern Pacific Railroad, which subsequently abandoned large portions of the E.P.S.W. The onset of the Great Depression, as well as the establishment of an interstate highway between Douglas and El Paso, reduced the importance of the rail connection. In World War II, the depot served as a major stopping point for troop trains making cross-country trips. However, after the war, passenger traffic fell off, and the depot was little used. Southern Pacific sold the depot to the city of Douglas on October 24, 1985. It was entered into the National Register of Historic Places on April 16, 1986.

== Architecture ==
=== Exterior ===
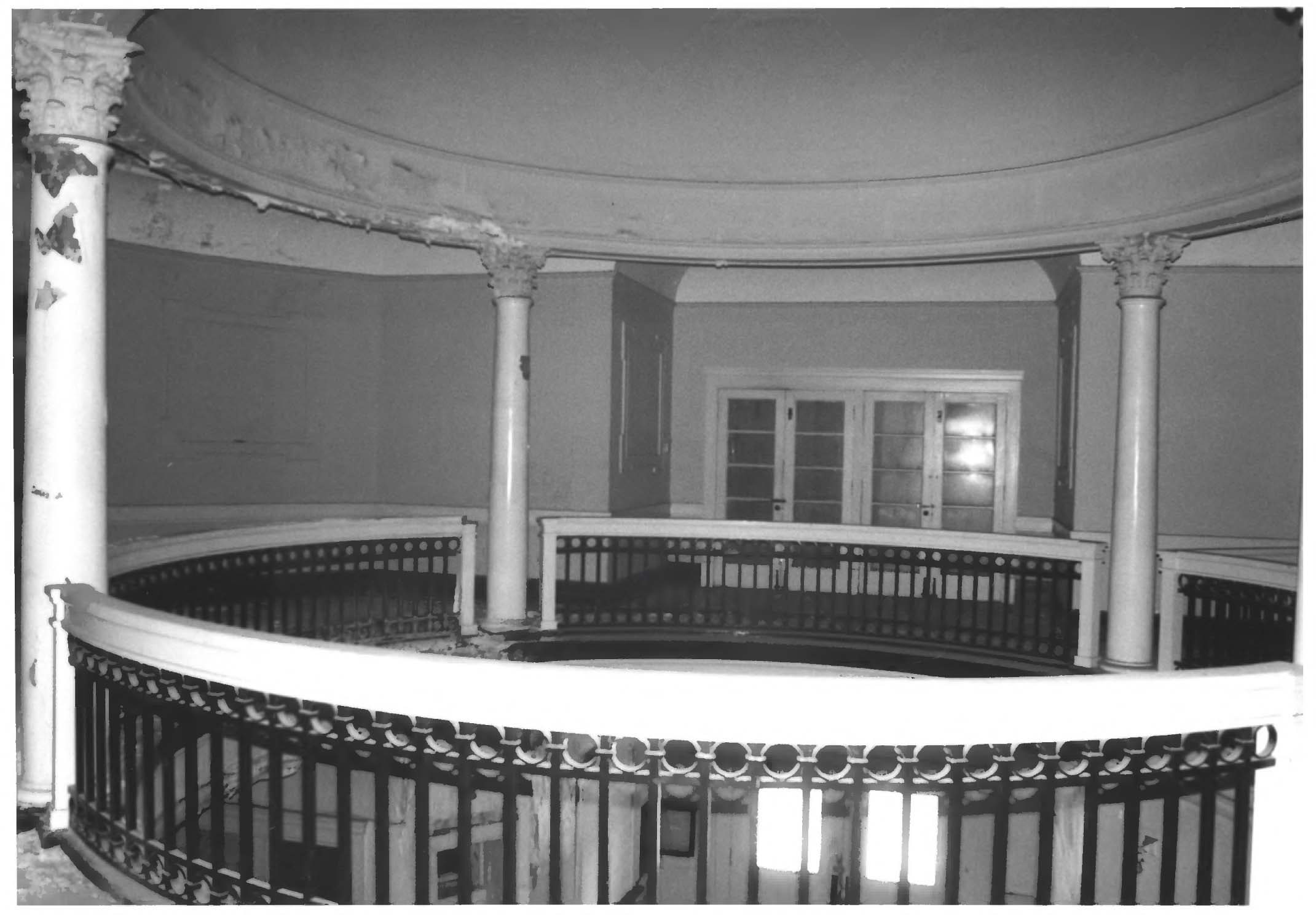
2nd floor balcony

The central, two-story portion of the depot measures 59' x 112', while the porticos at each end of the building measure 52' x 57'. Thus the total dimensions of the first story are 52' x 225'. The building rests on a solid concrete foundation, and the interior floors are polished concrete. The walls of the structure consist of brick and terra cotta. The roof trusses of the main structure are made of steel, While the portico roofs are concrete covered with poured asphalt. The roof on the main structure is a truncated hip-type covered with clay tiles, which surrounds a flat tin plate section in the center of the building.

This structure is architecturally unusual and significant because of its Beaux Arts style, designed with a large rectilinear mass in the center and smaller open porticos attached to each end of the building. An attic story completes the main portico, while parquet roofs top the porticos. The whole is symmetrical in appearance, and the depot's design is of colossal order because the two stories are meant to appear as one, stressing the monumentality of the structure. The recessed main entrances on both sides of the structure are accented with four Tuscan columns extending the entire two stories. .A large, flat covered porch projects from each recessed entry point on the first floor level. On either side of the central entries are floor to ceiling windows, trimmed in terra cotta, that create a unified, pleasing ground to roofline appearance.

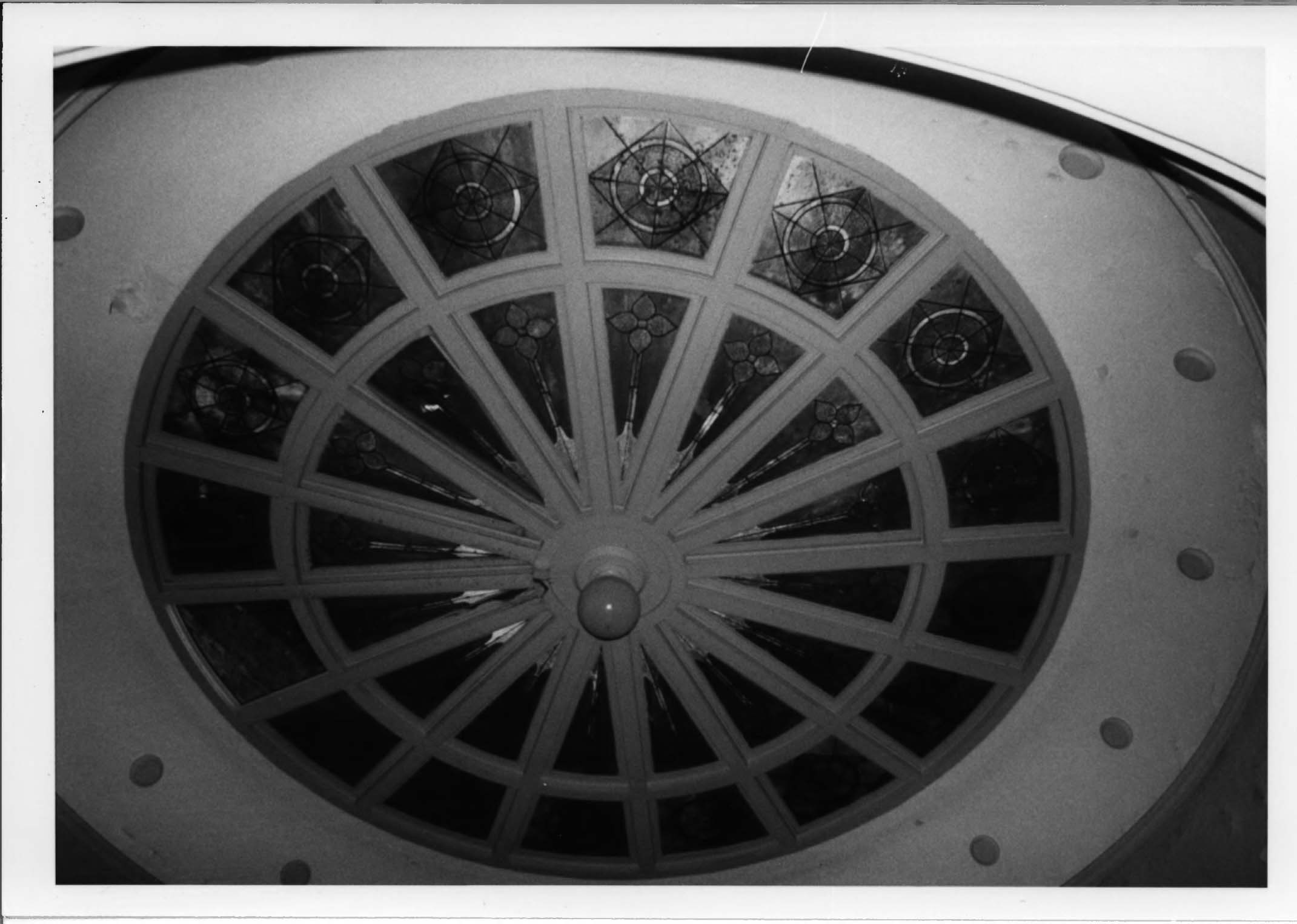
Circular skylight over rotunda

Crowning the second story is an entablature topped by an extension of the brick facade which leads to the roof. The truncated hip-type roof blends into a flat, rectangular, central portion that is occupied by a large hemispherical dome. This dome consists of a stained glass inner panel covered by a plaster and lath protective shell. The porticos exhibit a simpler design, being almost square. These covered porticos are attached to each end of the large building. Each portico's wall consists of a simple three-arch arcade, thus giving each portico nine arches, each of which is a simple elliptical arch with a keystone. Pilasters that run through an entablature and culminate in a capped parapet divide the arches. The entire structure is finished in a high quality beige brick, and the clay roof tiles are a typical mission tile red.

=== Interior ===
The interior of the building is two stories high with wooden steps leading to the upper floors. Construction is mainly concrete plaster walls with concrete floors. The center of the building is graced by a three-story rotunda with ornate stained glass at the top. On the second floor is a circular balcony that overlooks the main floor lobby and provides a beautiful view of the stained glass ceiling. There are many side rooms on all the floors with many exterior windows that provide a panoramic view of the building grounds and the surrounding area. In addition, French style doors lead from the second floor onto balconies on the north and south sides of the building.
