= El Paso and Southwestern Railroad =

Defunct American short-line railroad

Overview
- Locale: Arizona, New Mexico, Texas; Sonora, Mexico
- Dates of operation: 1888–1961
- Successor: Southern Pacific

Technical
- Track gauge: 4 ft 8 1/2 in (1,435 mm) standard gauge

The El Paso and Southwestern Railroad began in 1888 as the Arizona and South Eastern Railroad, a short line serving copper mines in southern Arizona. Over the next few decades, it grew into a 1200-mile system that stretched from Tucumcari, New Mexico, southward to El Paso, Texas, and westward to Tucson, Arizona, with several branch lines, including one to Nacozari, Mexico. The railroad was bought by the Southern Pacific Railroad in 1924 and fully merged into its parent company in 1955. The EP&SW was a major link in the transcontinental route of the Golden State Limited.

== Founding ==
James Douglas was a former professor of chemistry working for William E. Dodge Jr. and Daniel Willis James, majority co-owners of the trading firm Phelps, Dodge and Co. Phelps Dodge was interested in entering the copper mining industry, and hired Douglas to make an inspection of mining claims in the Southwestern United States. Douglas suggested that the two men invest in the Detroit Copper Mining Company of Arizona, which owned a copper mining claim in Morenci, Arizona Territory, as well as purchase the Atlanta claim, adjoining the Copper Queen Mine, in Bisbee, Arizona Territory. In 1881, Phelps Dodge followed both recommendations, taking an interest in the Detroit Copper Mining Company, and purchasing a controlling interest in the Atlanta mine. After the Copper Queen and Atlanta mines both struck the Atlanta ore body in 1884, Phelps Dodge merged with the Copper Queen, to avoid litigation sparked by the "law of the apex". The company merged its various mining interests into the Copper Queen Consolidated Mining Company in 1885, and installed Douglas as president and part-owner.

With production in the Bisbee area expanding, Douglas formed the Arizona and South Eastern Railroad in 1888. The railroad ran on a short spur of track from Bisbee to Fairbank, Arizona, where it met the mainline of the Atchison, Topeka and Santa Fe Railway's New Mexico and Arizona Railroad. Shortly thereafter and unhappy with AT&SF rates, the line was extended to Benson, Arizona, to connect with the Southern Pacific Railroad. In 1900, Copper Queen Consolidated built a new smelter at the newly built town of Douglas, Arizona (named for James Douglas), to which the railroad was extended again. The line was renamed the El Paso and Southwestern Railroad on June 25, 1901, to reflect its larger scope (even though it did not yet extend to El Paso, Texas).

After the deaths of Dodge in 1903 and James in 1907, the various Phelps Dodge railroads, mining companies, real estate firms, as well as other subsidiaries and divisions were all merged into Phelps Dodge and Company. In 1915, Phelps Dodge and Company went public as Phelps-Dodge.

== Expansion ==
=== Nacozari Railroad ===
James and Dodge had acquired the Moctezuma Copper Company in the state of Sonora in Mexico, and in 1902 the El Paso and Southwestern line was extended south from Douglas to the Mexican town of Nacozari de García. The Nacozari Railroad, owned by Moctezuma Copper Co. and used to transport ore to the Moctezuma smelter at Nacozari, was incorporated into the El Paso and Southwestern.

=== Morenci Southern Railroad ===
Phelps Dodge continued to expand, and purchased other mines surrounding their Detroit Copper Company mine near Morenci, Arizona. An eventual subsidiary of the El Paso and Southwestern—the Morenci Southern—was incorporated on June 6, 1902, and its roadbed connected the Morenci mines to the Arizona and New Mexico Railway (a subsidiary of the Arizona Copper Co., Ltd) at Guthrie, Arizona.

The Morenci Southern Railroad was a 18.4 miles (29.6 km) long 3 ft (914 mm) narrow-gauge railway. The line overcame an elevation difference of 1,400 feet (430 m) by means of five circular loops. Consequently, the railway earned the nickname "The Corkscrew Railroad of America." In 1914, some of the trestle bridges were declared at risk of collapse, leading to the replacement of some of the loops with a series of switchbacks (zig-zags) to navigate the change in elevation.

At its peak, the railway operated two round trips per day, carrying both passengers and freight. A one-way journey took approximately two hours.

=== El Paso and Northeastern Railway ===
In 1903, the terminus of the El Paso and Southwestern was extended from Douglas to El Paso by building new track as well as purchasing track from the El Paso and Northeastern Railway, adding over 200 miles (320 km) of roadway to the line, also extending its reach to Tucumcari, New Mexico. The purchase of the Dawson Railway in 1905 extended the railroad to Dawson, New Mexico, where Phelps Dodge had recently acquired coal mines to feed its smelting operations Near Deming, New Mexico, the new track had to cross the line of the Southern Pacific Railroad. Aware that the Southern Pacific had only two watchmen on the route, the El Paso and Southwestern stopped all SP trains on either side of the junction and laid its new track across that of the Southern Pacific. In one day, the El Paso and Southwestern ran more than 500 fully laden hopper cars across the new junction to establish a right-of-way. The Southern Pacific sued and won a temporary injunction, but the injunction was never enforced and the El Paso and Southwestern continued to cross the Southern Pacific's line.

=== Extension to Tucson ===
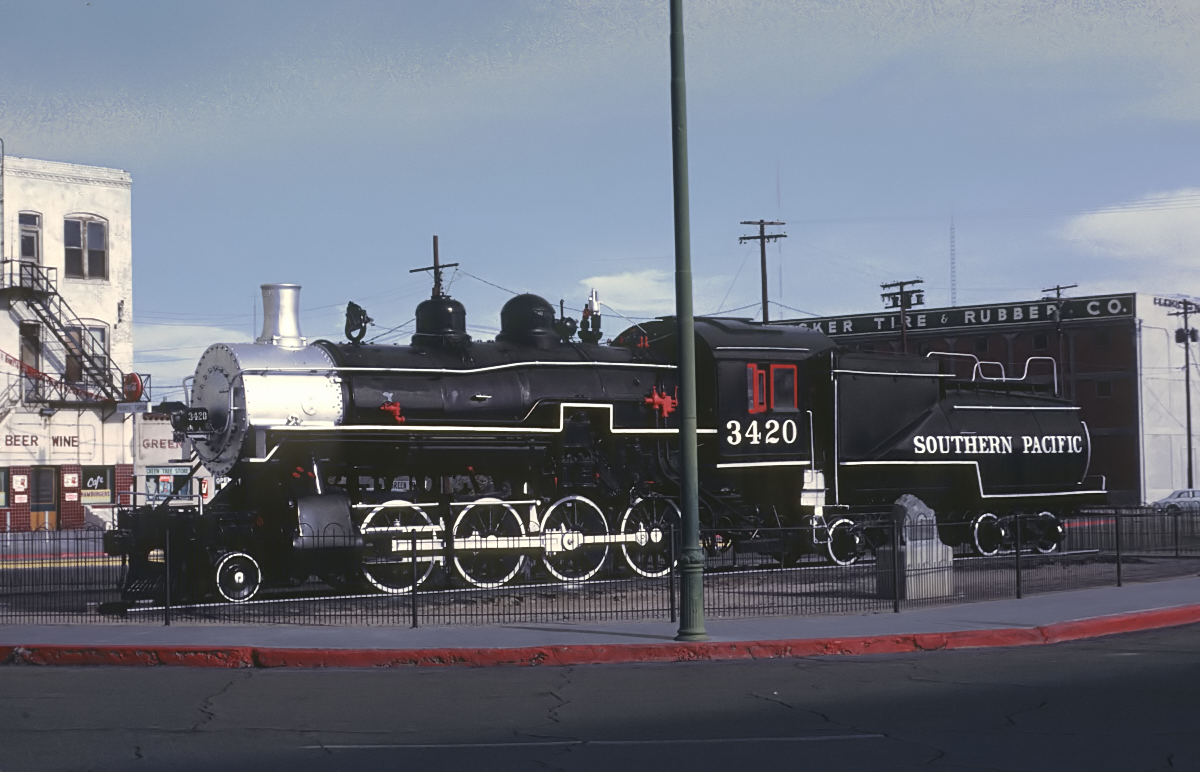
Southern Pacific No. 3420, an ex-EP&SW steam locomotive, on static display at El Paso in 1967

Historian David Leighton wrote, that in February 1910, James Douglas, head of the Phelps Dodge Corporation, announced his plan to make Tucson the western terminus of the El Paso and Southwestern Railroad. Up to that point, Benson had that honor. The board of directors for the company would later that year approve Douglas's plan, making it official. The extension was from Fairbank, Arizona, (now a ghost town about 10 miles west of Tombstone) to Tucson, which had beat out Florence and Phoenix for this honor.

By October 1911, there were forty camps of railroad workers between Fairbank and the Vail train station, with another one in the plans, within six miles of Tucson. In March 1912, the railroad executives chose a classical design, for its new passenger and freight depots which included a baggage room, ticket office, waiting rooms, operator's office and a rotunda that was 30 feet in diameter. The roof was to be made of red tile and four Tuscan columns would be by the main entrance. On Oct. 31, 1912, F.L Hunter, manager of the E.P. & S.W. purchasing department, drove in the last spike to complete the rail line, a ceremony witnessed by many Tucsonans. This was followed by the first scheduled train arriving on November 20, 1912, with a crowd of 3,000 people gathered around the temporary depot to greet it and celebrate the official arrival of the El Paso & Southwestern Railroad.

The passenger depot was finished the following year and served travelers until 1924, when the railroad merged with the Southern Pacific Railroad. Two years later, the building was to become the headquarters for the U.S. Border Patrol's Tucson Sector. More recently it was home to two Mexican restaurants, Carlos Murphy's and Garcia's.

=== Bisbee deportation ===
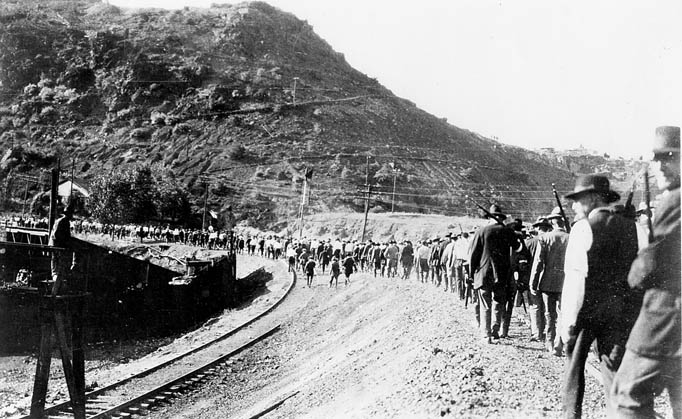
Deportation of striking miners from Bisbee, Arizona, on July 12, 1917. Striking miners and others are marched from Warren Ballpark along railroad tracks toward cattle cars belonging to the El Paso and Southwestern Railroad.

The railroad's expansion continued gradually, and by 1917 the El Paso and Southwestern Railroad had more than 1,000 miles (1,600 km) of track in operation. However, the same year saw the railroad involved in a significant labor dispute. During the Bisbee Deportation, railroad officials collaborated with their counterparts in the Phelps Dodge mining subsidiaries to deport more than 1,300 striking mine workers, their supporters, and even innocent citizen bystanders from the town of Bisbee more than 200 miles (320 km) to the town of Hermanas, New Mexico.

== Demise ==
The worldwide collapse of copper prices after World War I severely affected not only the railroad's financial fortunes but those of the mining companies it served. In 1924, the Southern Pacific leased the entire El Paso and Southwest Railroad from Phelps Dodge, assuming the operation on either October 31 or November 1. In 1929, the ICC authorized abandonment of the Deming Branch. In November 1937, the railroad purchased the outstanding interest in the El Paso and Northeastern Railroad. It acquired the El Paso Southern Railway Company in December 1954.

The El Paso and Southwestern Railroad was purchased from Phelps Dodge and merged into the Southern Pacific in 1955; the Texas subsidiary remained until 1961. Southern Pacific sold the line from Benson to Douglas to Kyle Railroads as the San Pedro & Southwestern Railway in 1992.

== Route and notable buildings ==
=== Route ===
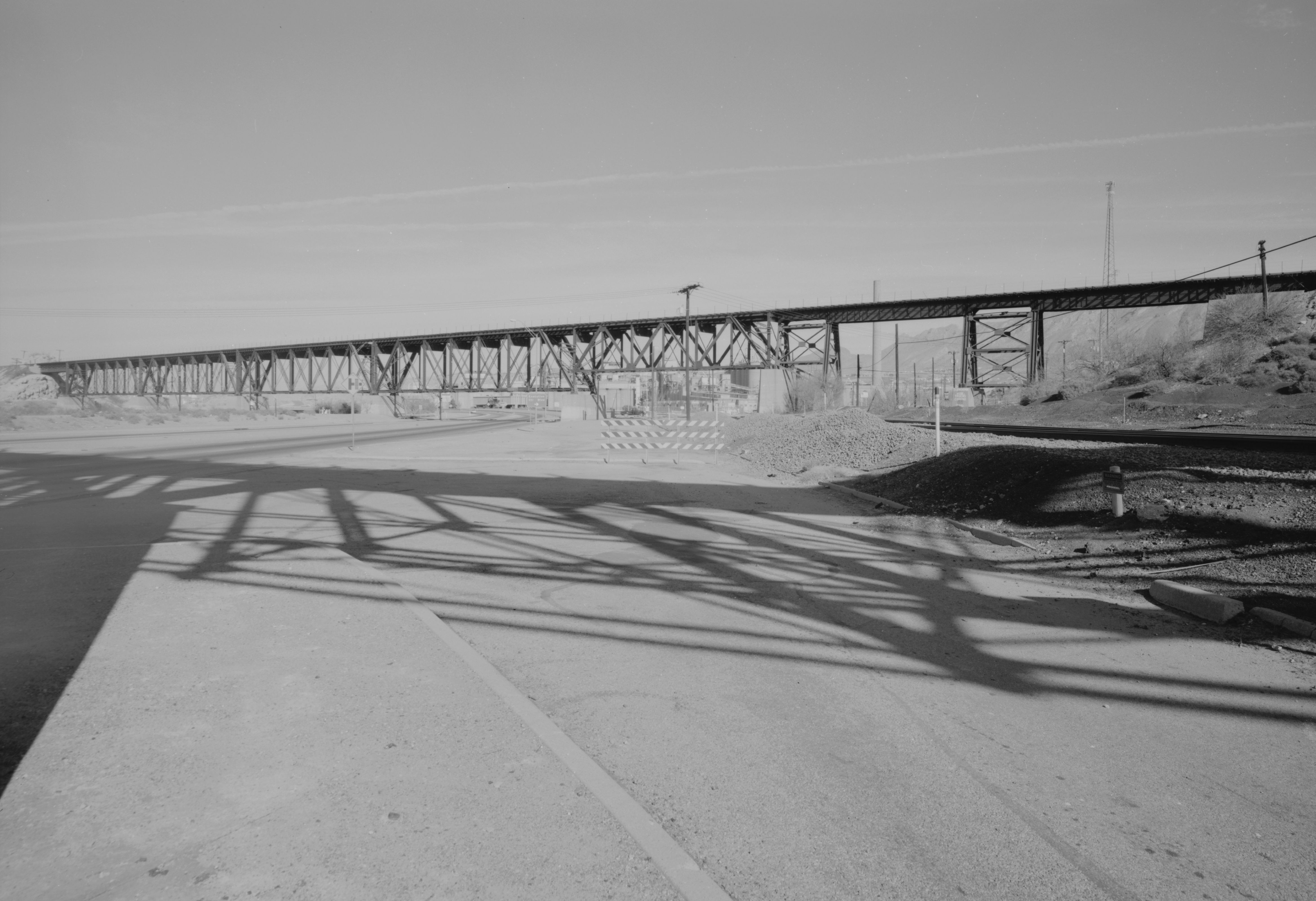
El Paso and Southwestern Railroad bridge over the Rio Grande near El Paso, Texas, circa 1968

Highways follow most of the route of the El Paso and Southwestern Railroad. Beginning in Tucson, Arizona, Arizona State Route 80 (formerly U.S. Route 80) largely parallels the railroad grade south to Douglas. State Route 80 then follows the old tracks northeast to Rodeo, New Mexico. The tracks diverge from the highway here, and largely follow Gas Line Road until it intersects with New Mexico State Road 9 near Animas, New Mexico. State Road 9 runs next to or on top of the old railroad grade until it reaches El Paso, Texas.

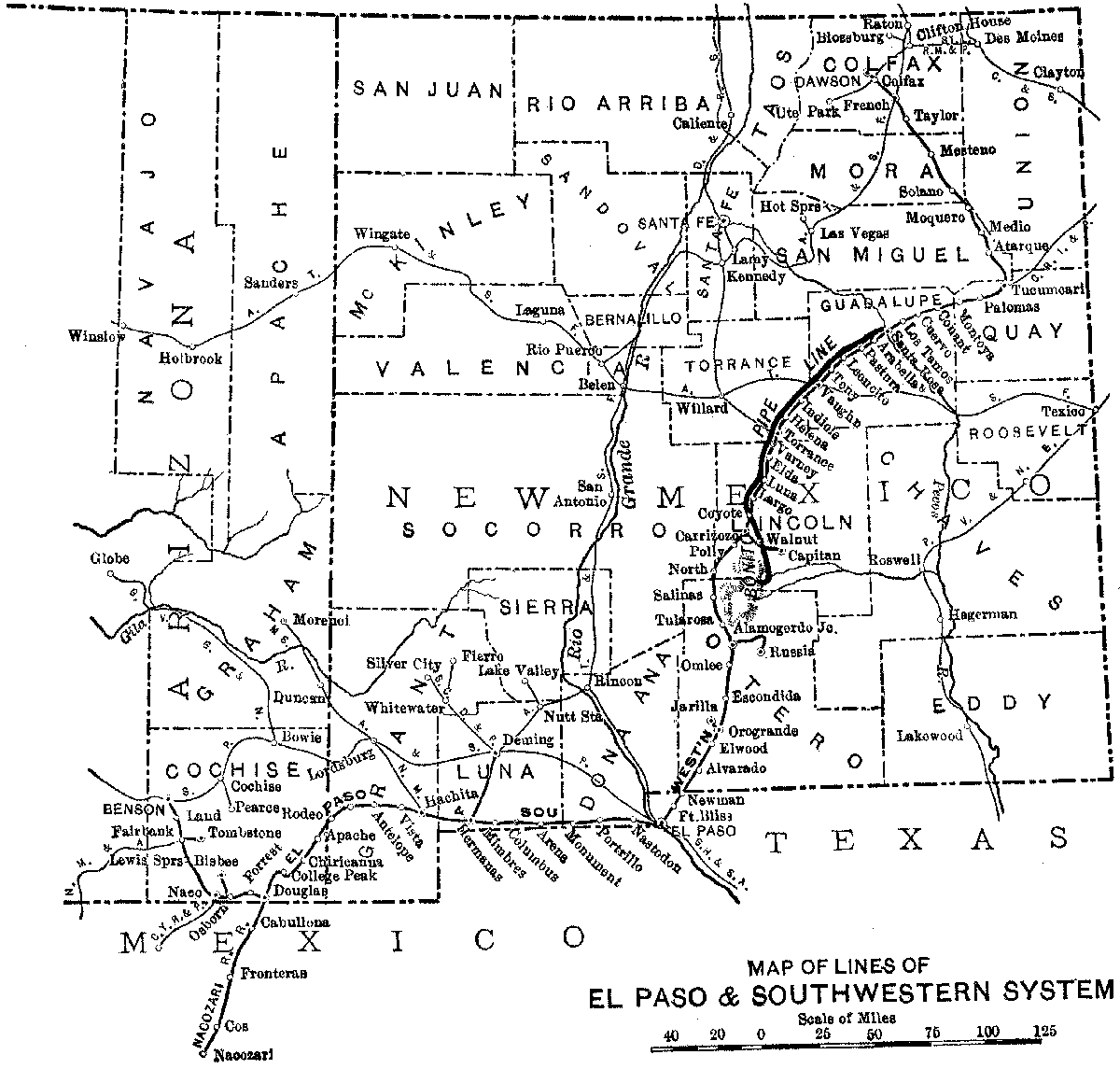
System map circa 1910

The Arizona & New Mexico spur of the railroad may be traced by following U.S. Route 70 west from Lordsburg to its Junction with U.S. Route 191, then north to Morenci, Arizona. The Mexican spur may be followed by beginning in Douglas, crossing the international border into Mexico, and following Mexican Federal Highway 14 to Nacozari de García.

The New Mexico & Northeastern parallels or is underneath U.S. Route 54 from El Paso to Santa Rosa. The line then follows Interstate 40 into Tucumcari NM and a connection to Chicago through the Rock Island. The Dawson line can be followed on U.S. 54 to Logan NM, then on NM 39 to Abbott. 39 ends and the tracks continue northwesterly at U.S. Route 412. By turning left onto 412, the driver follows that route into Springer NM to join I-25 N. to Maxwell. Take New Mexico State Road 505 (which intersects Interstate 25 at Maxwell, New Mexico) to Colfax, New Mexico. The Dawson Road travels the remainder of the spur from Colfax to the ghost town of Dawson. As of 1905, the El Paso and Southwestern Railroad had a route that connected from Dawson through Roy, Tucumcari, Santa Rosa, Vaughn, Carrizozo, Tularosa and Alamogordo, New Mexico to El Paso, Texas and Douglas, Arizona, with spurs to Deming and Lordsburg. that later all became part of the Southern Pacific.

=== Historic buildings ===
==== National ====
Several El Paso and Southwestern buildings are on the National Register of Historic Places. Among these are:

- El Paso and Southwestern Railroad Depot at 419 W. Congress Street in Tucson, Arizona (built 1912–1913)
- El Paso and Southwestern Railroad Passenger Depot-Douglas (also known as the Southern Pacific Railroad Passenger Depot) at 14th Street and H Avenue in Douglas, Arizona;
- El Paso and Southwestern Railroad YMCA (also known as the Douglas YMCA) at 1000 Pan American Avenue in Douglas; and the Columbus, NM Museum at the intersection of NM State Routes 9 & 11.

==== Texas ====
In 2006, the El Paso and Southwestern Freight Depot in El Paso, Texas, built in 1903 and designed by Daniel Burnham, was placed on Preservation Texas's Most Endangered Places list.

Historic El Paso and South Western Railroad Depot in Tucson, Arizona

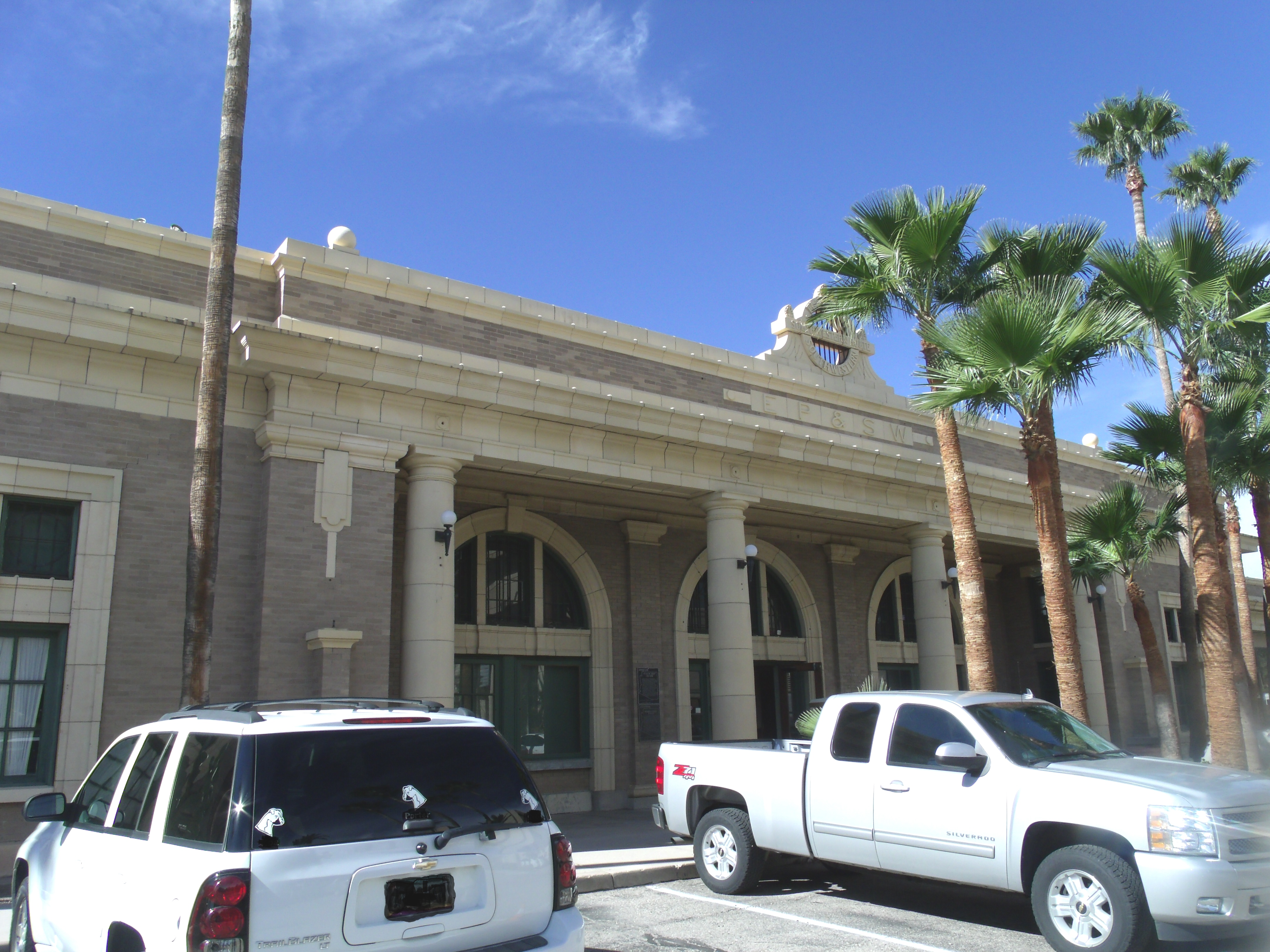
Exterior

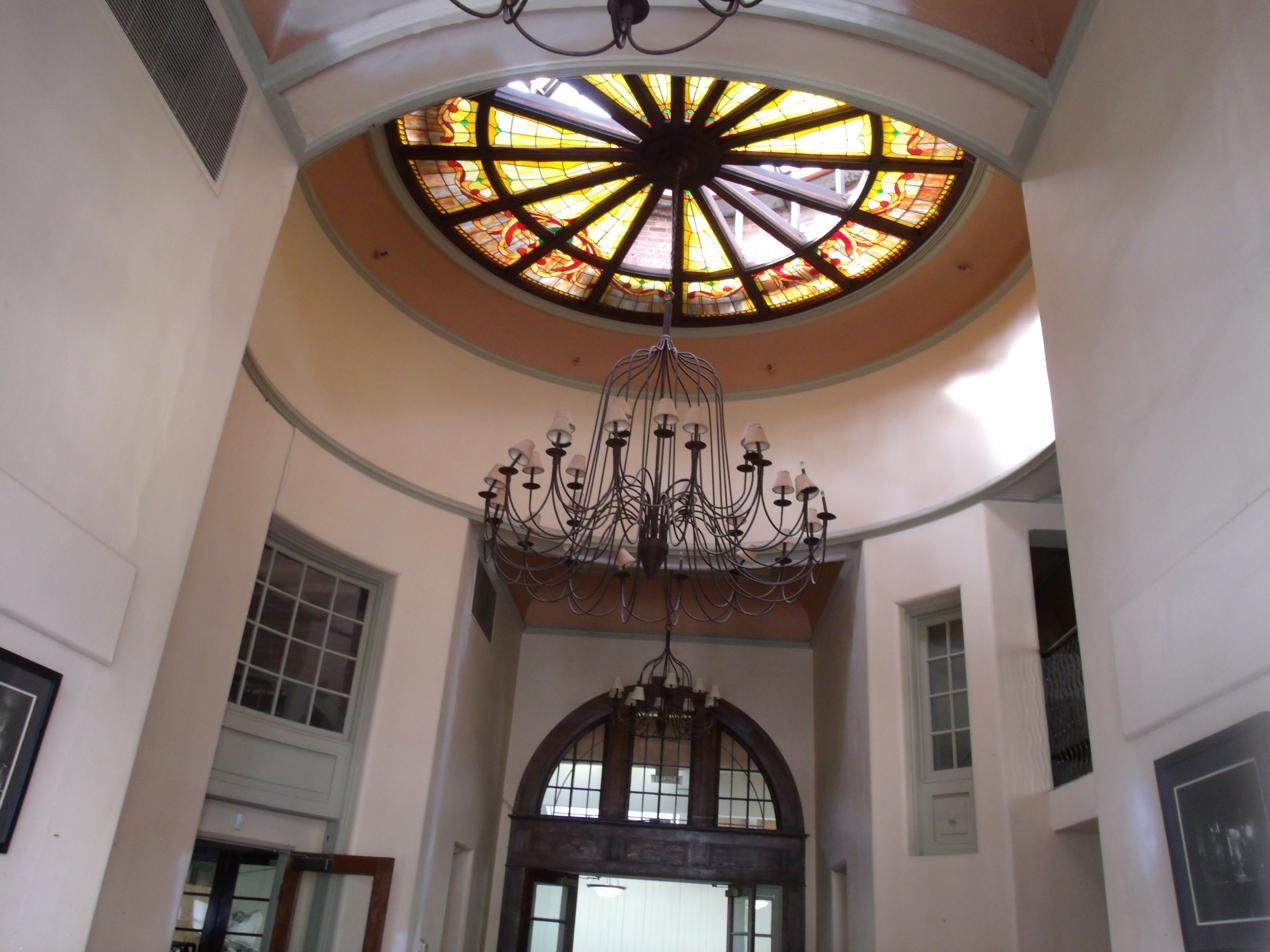
Interior

== Preserved and surviving locomotives ==
El Paso & Southwestern Railroad No. 1 locomotive is preserved at El Paso, Texas. Southern Pacific 3420, a Baldwin 2-8-0 light consolidation, oil burning, former EP&SW engine, is stored at the Phelps Dodge copper refinery in El Paso, Texas.

== See also ==
- Mexico North Western Railway
