= Apache Canyon Railroad Bridge =

- U.S. National Register of Historic Places
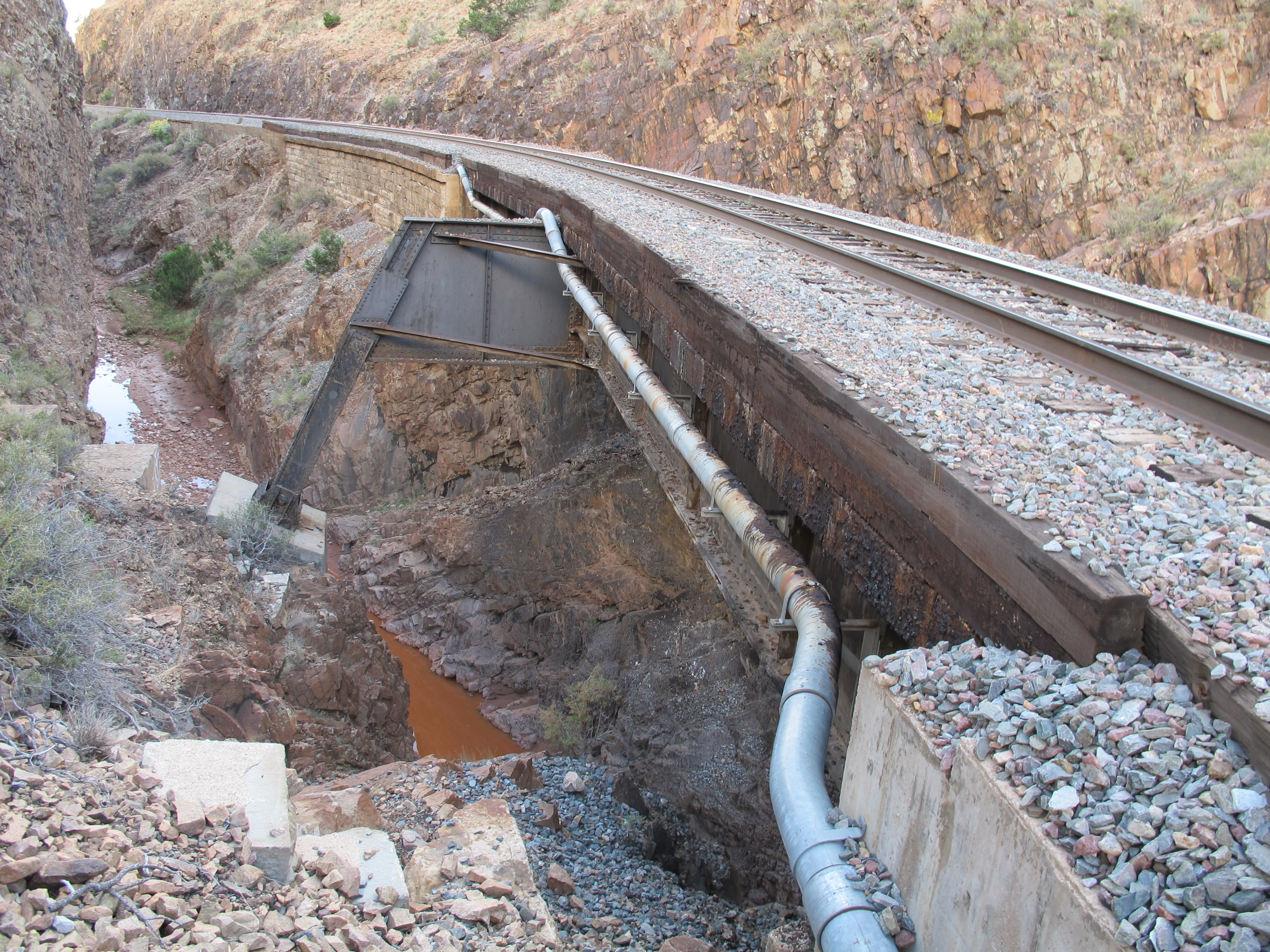

- Location within New Mexico Location within the United States
- Nearest city: Lamy, New Mexico
- Coordinates: 35°30′49″N 105°51′17″W
- Area: 27 acres (11 ha)
- Built: 1908
- Architectural style: deck plate girder bridge
- NRHP reference No.: 79001553
- Added to NRHP: April 27, 1979

The Apache Canyon Railroad Bridge, located 3 miles (4.8 km) northeast of Lamy in Santa Fe County, New Mexico, is a deck plate girder bridge built in 1908 by the American Bridge Co.of New York, per a manufacturers plaque on the eastern side of the cross girder, though the NRHP form erroneous states a build date of 1892. It was listed on the National Register of Historic Places in 1979.

It crosses over Galisteo Creek diagonally, with girders 105 feet (32 m) long.
