= Don Gaspar Bridge =

- U.S. National Register of Historic Places
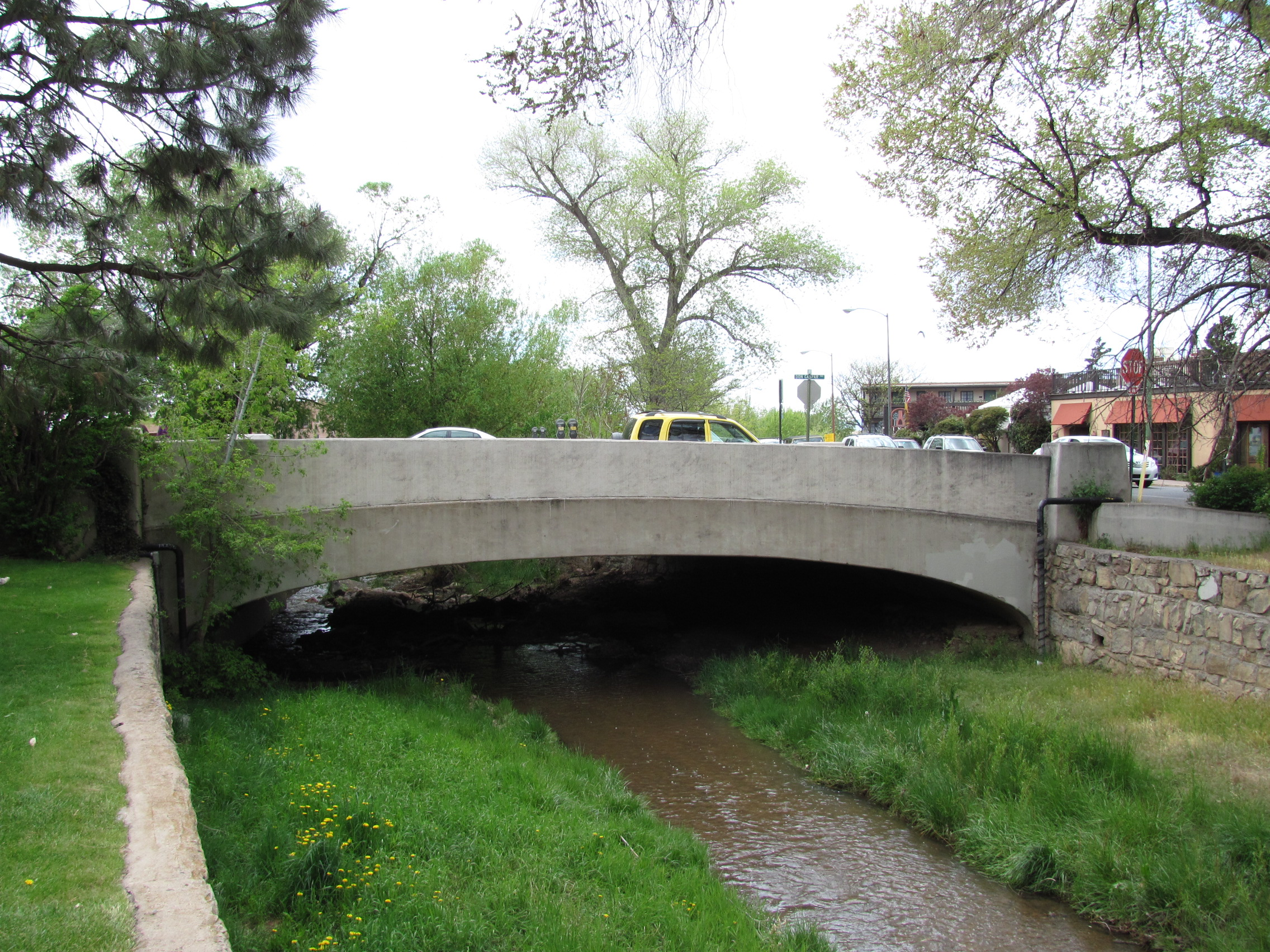

- Location within New Mexico
- Location: Don Gaspar Ave. crossing over the Santa Fe R. bet. Alameda and E. De Vargas Sts., Santa Fe, New Mexico
- Coordinates: 35°41′06″N 105°56′22″W
- Area: less than one acre
- Built: 1934
- Engineer: E.B. Van de Greyn
- Architectural style: Pueblo
- NRHP reference No.: 02001163
- Added to NRHP: October 16, 2002

The Don Gaspar Bridge, in Santa Fe, New Mexico, brings Don Gaspar Avenue over the Santa Fe River, between Alameda and E. De Vargas Streets. It was built in 1934. It was listed on the National Register of Historic Places in 2002.

The bridge's design introduced, to the area, use of reinforced concrete to make a thinner, more appealing appearance. Its layout was designed by state bridge engineer E.B. Van de Greyn.

It has also been known as El Puente de Los Conquistadores.
