= Mexican Canyon Trestle =

- U.S. National Register of Historic Places
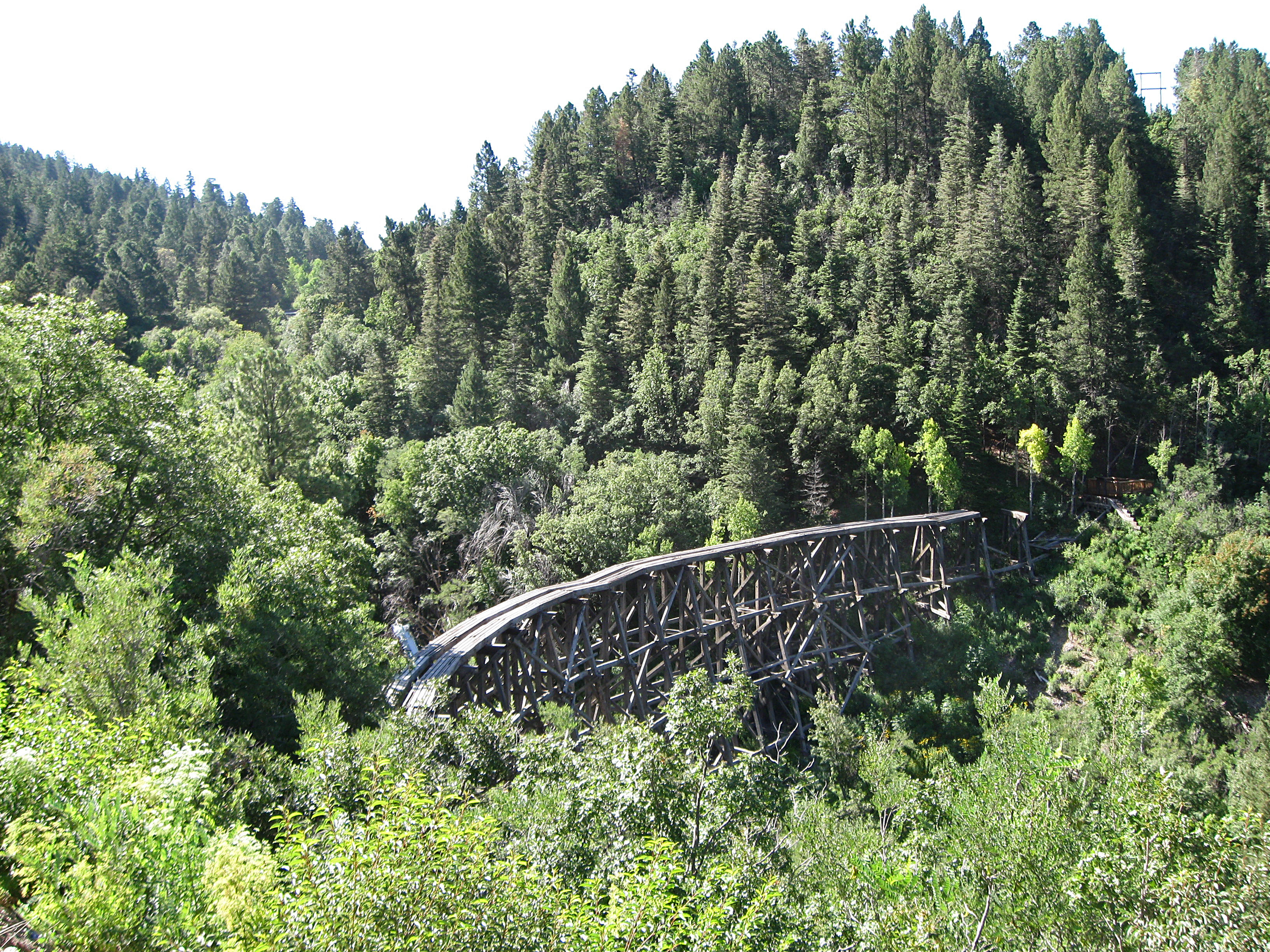

- Location within New Mexico
- Nearest city: Cloudcroft, New Mexico
- Coordinates: 32.963734°N 105.747675°W
- Area: 1 acre (0.40 ha)
- Built: 1899
- Built by: Alamogordo & Sacramento Mountains Railroad
- Architectural style: Trestle bridge
- MPS: Historic Highway Bridges of New Mexico MPS
- NRHP reference No.: 79001543
- Added to NRHP: May 7, 1979

Mexican Canyon Trestle is an historic wooden trestle bridge in New Mexico's Sacramento Mountains, Otero County, New Mexico, just outside Cloudcroft, New Mexico. It was listed on the National Register of Historic Places in 1979.

It is located about .5 miles (0.80 km) northwest of Cloudcroft off US 82. It can be seen from a viewpoint, off the highway, with a historical plaque describing "The Cloud Climbing Railroad".

It is the most prominent remaining structure of the Alamogordo and Sacramento Mountain Railway which operated under various names from 1899 to 1947.

Built in 1899, the curved trestle has an overall length of 323 feet and rises 52 feet above the canyon floor. Vertical supports spaced 15 feet apart consist of 12" x 12" timbers. The rails (removed in 1948) and crossties were placed on 8"x16" stringers held together with three-quarter-inch bolts and cast iron spacers. In order to form the curve, the top part was built in 21 sections with 8"x16" timbers. There are 10 main timbers 15 feet in length in each of the 21 sections resting on footing blocks set 4 to 8 feet underground. Lateral, longitudinal, and diagonal wooden braces prevented sway and shifting of the trestle. A wooden guard rail ran along the track to keep the ties from bunching. Metal guard rails running outside the standard gauge rails prevented derailed trains from falling off the trestle.

This structure was one of 58 trestles built on the mountainous 32-mile route which also required a switchback and numerous sharp curves. After the route was abandoned in 1947, the rails were taken up and salvagers removed a few of the timbers. The trestle is still essentially intact, however, and is a striking feature of the landscape near Cloudcroft.

It is a large trestle bridge, in fact huge relative to the size of the single-tier Bridge A 249 a short ways away.

It is a multi-tier wood-frame trestle which was part of the Alamogordo & Sacramento Mountains Railroad, a railroad that operated from 1899 to 1947. The railroad had about 26 miles (42 km) of track connecting Alamogordo, New Mexico to spruce and fir timber areas in the Sacramento Mountains.

This trestle is one of seven trestles surviving out of 51 built by the railroad. It was deemed significant as "the most prominent remaining structure of the Alamogordo and Sacramento Mountain Railway" and as a largely well-preserved, prominent landmark. It is located at an elevation of 8,450 feet.
