= El Paso and Southwestern Railroad YMCA =

- U.S. National Register of Historic Places
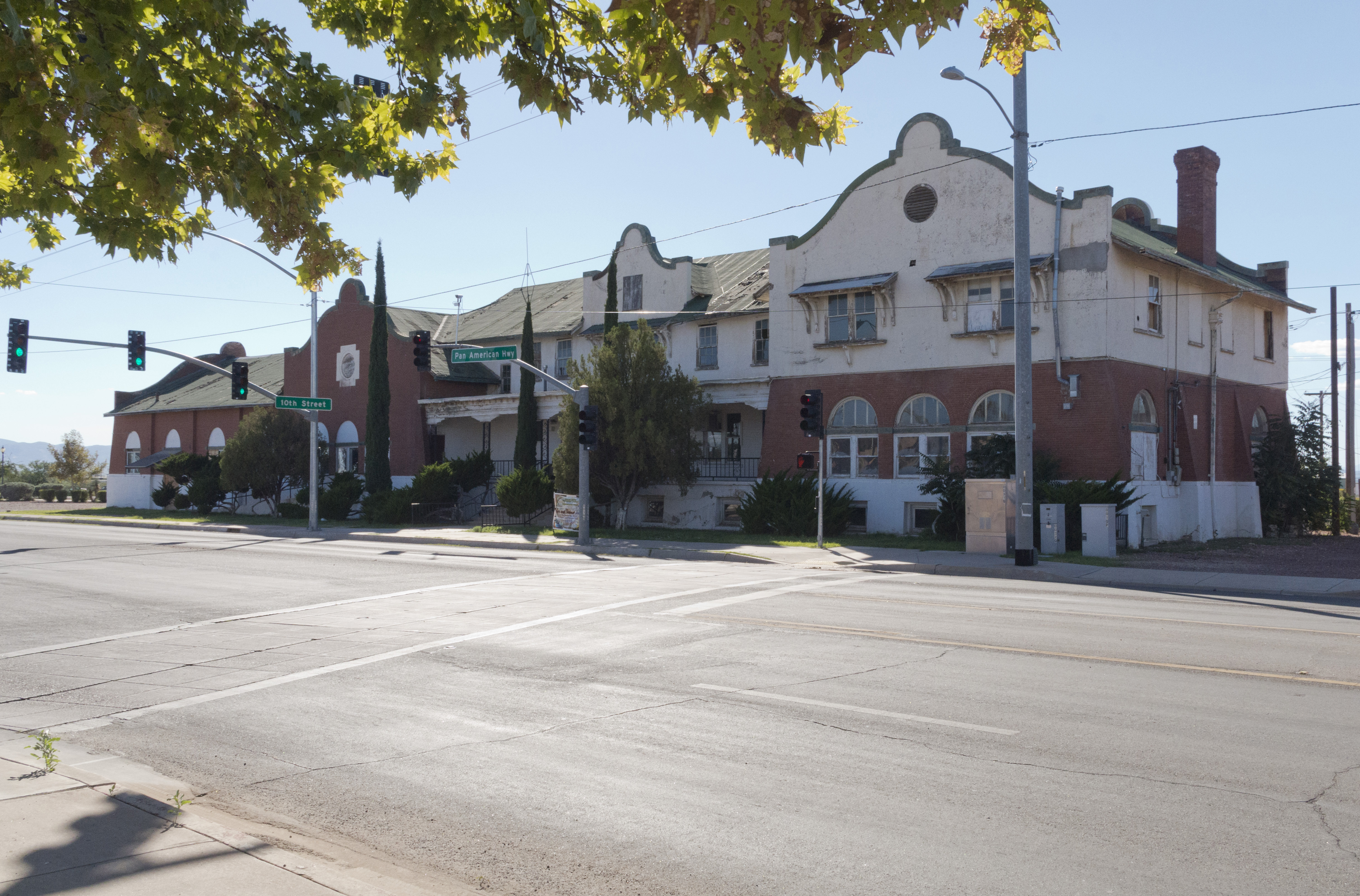

- Location within Arizona Location within the United States
- Location: 1000 Pan American Ave., Douglas, Arizona
- Coordinates: 31°20′40″N 109°33′24″W
- Area: 0.3 acres (0.12 ha)
- Built: 1905; 1918
- Architect: Theodore C. Link
- Architectural style: Mission/Spanish Revival
- NRHP reference No.: 84000647
- Added to NRHP: March 1, 1984

The El Paso and Southwestern Railroad YMCA, also known as the Douglas YMCA, is a large brick building in Douglas, Arizona. It was listed on the National Register of Historic Places in 1984.

It is a Mission Revival style building designed by architect Theodore C. Link. Its two-story main portion was built in 1905 and is 53 feet (16 m) by 150 feet (46 m). It has a 1918 one-story addition.
