= Delgado Street Bridge =

- U.S. National Register of Historic Places
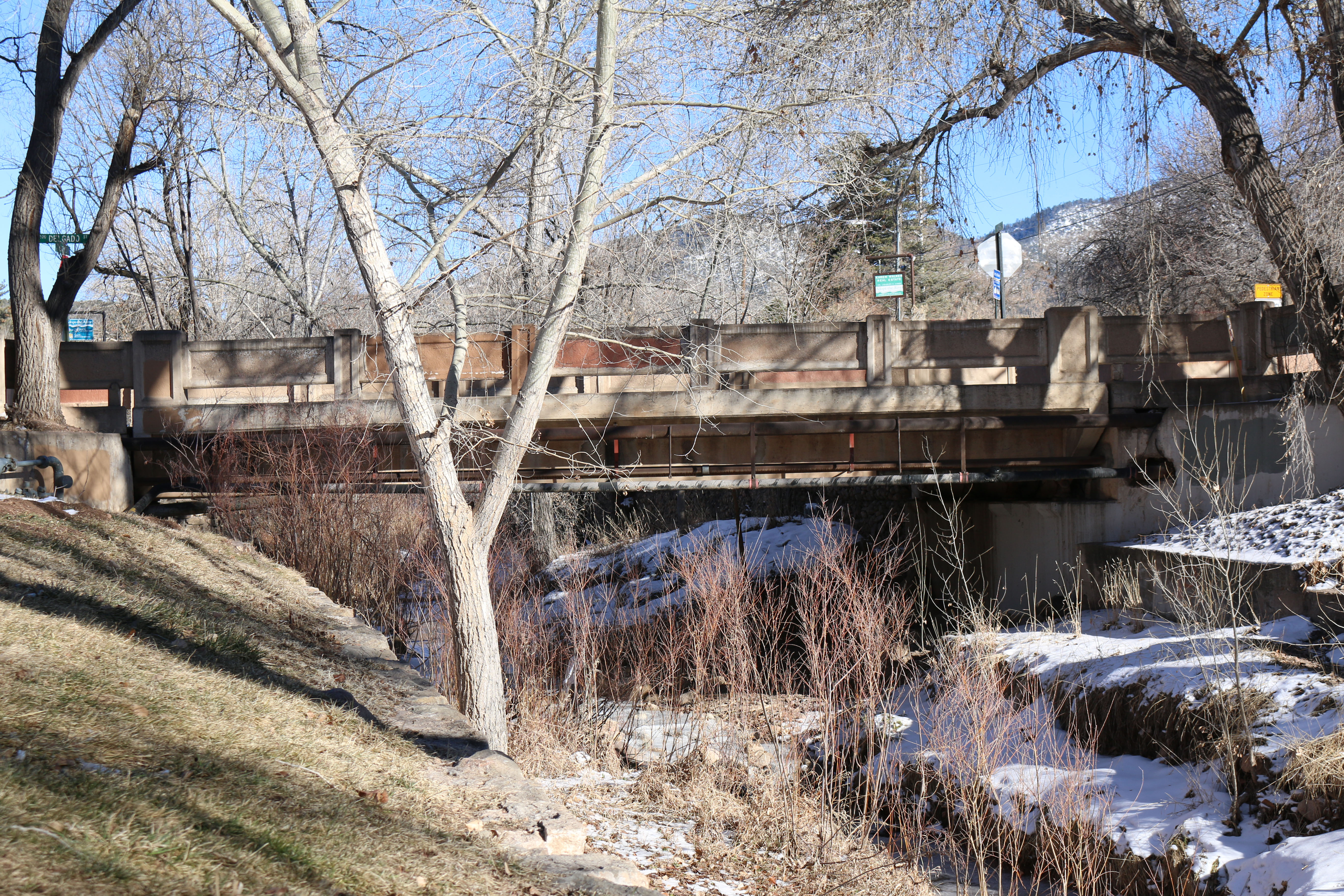
- Bridge in 2014

- Location within New Mexico
- Location: Delgado St. over the Santa Fe River, Santa Fe, New Mexico
- Coordinates: 35°41′04″N 105°55′52″W
- Built: 1927-28
- Built by: Levy Construction Company
- Architectural style: Reinforced concrete deck-girder design
- NRHP reference No.: 15000494
- Added to NRHP: August 3, 2015

The Delgado Street Bridge, across the Santa Fe River in Santa Fe, New Mexico, was listed on the National Register of Historic Places in 2015. It is the oldest motor vehicle bridge in Santa Fe.

== History ==
The bridge was built in 1927–28. A prior bridge on the site was torn away by floodwaters on September 30, 1904. Prior to the flood, the city had raised concern about flooding and scouring of the banks. A 1903 ordinance directed adjacent property owners to build breakwaters to protect the river bank, but not everyone complied. After the flood, the city directed its resources to building the breakwaters. A project was planned in 1905 to build the breakwater, but the city council only had $500 available to do the work, which was not nearly enough. They appealed to the county, but the county didn't have enough money either. Since New Mexico was still a territory at that time, there was a paucity of taxable property and no federal aid.

When New Mexico became a state in 1912, the city formed a planning commission with the vision of a "city different" emphasizing its traditional architecture and preserving its historic meandering streets. The plan included a park along the river and landscaped boulevards on both sides. This plan was not fully realized until the 1920s and 1930s. The Federal Aid Road Act of 1916 finally provided some federal government aid, and the State Highway Department was formed to supervise the construction, maintenance, and repair of bridges. Unfortunately, this aid was only available for state and federal highways, and was not available for local streets.

The county was able to build a new bridge, the Bridge of Hidalgos at Grant Street, with the availability of federal aid in 1919, but this depleted the county's funding. During the 1920s, the city started to grow rapidly through migration and annexation, with its population doubling from 1910 to 1930, and the city began a program of beautification and infrastructure development. In 1926, residents petitioned the county commissioners to build a new bridge, and the board finally approved $15,000 to build three bridges over the Santa Fe River. On October 11, 1927, the board approved a bid of $6136.20 from the Levy Construction Company to build the bridge.

The bridge was designed as a reinforced concrete deck girder bridge, which was suitable for 25 feet (7.6 m) to 45 feet (14 m) unsupported spans. The lack of a supporting pier meant that debris would not be caught during flooding. It was given distinctive panelled railings, creating a gateway-like appearance as the railings wrapped away from the entrances.
