= Douglas Historic District =

- U.S. National Register of Historic Places
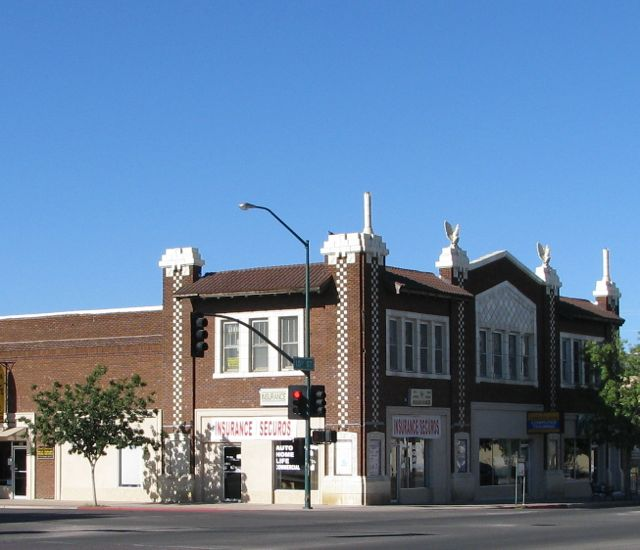
- Airdome Theatre (aka Leggett Building), 2013

- Location within Arizona Location within the United States
- Location: Douglas, Arizona
- Coordinates: 31°20′43″N 109°33′13″W
- NRHP reference No.: 85000146
- Added to NRHP: January 13, 1985

The Douglas Historic District includes the commercial area of Douglas, Arizona, a mining company town established in 1901. The dates of the buildings' construction range from 1901 to 1935. The district is bordered on the south by the buildings on G and H Avenues between 15th and 8th Street, and lie only eight blocks from the United States - Mexico border. The District includes architectural styles ranging from Queen Anne to Bungalow to Period Revival. One of the most interesting features is Church Square, which contains four churches in a single block. In 1930 the square was featured in Ripley's Believe It or Not, as the only block in the world which contained four churches: Grace Methodist (built 1902), St. Stephen's Episcopal (built 1903), First Baptist (built 1904), and First Presbyterian (built 1907).

== Description of the district ==
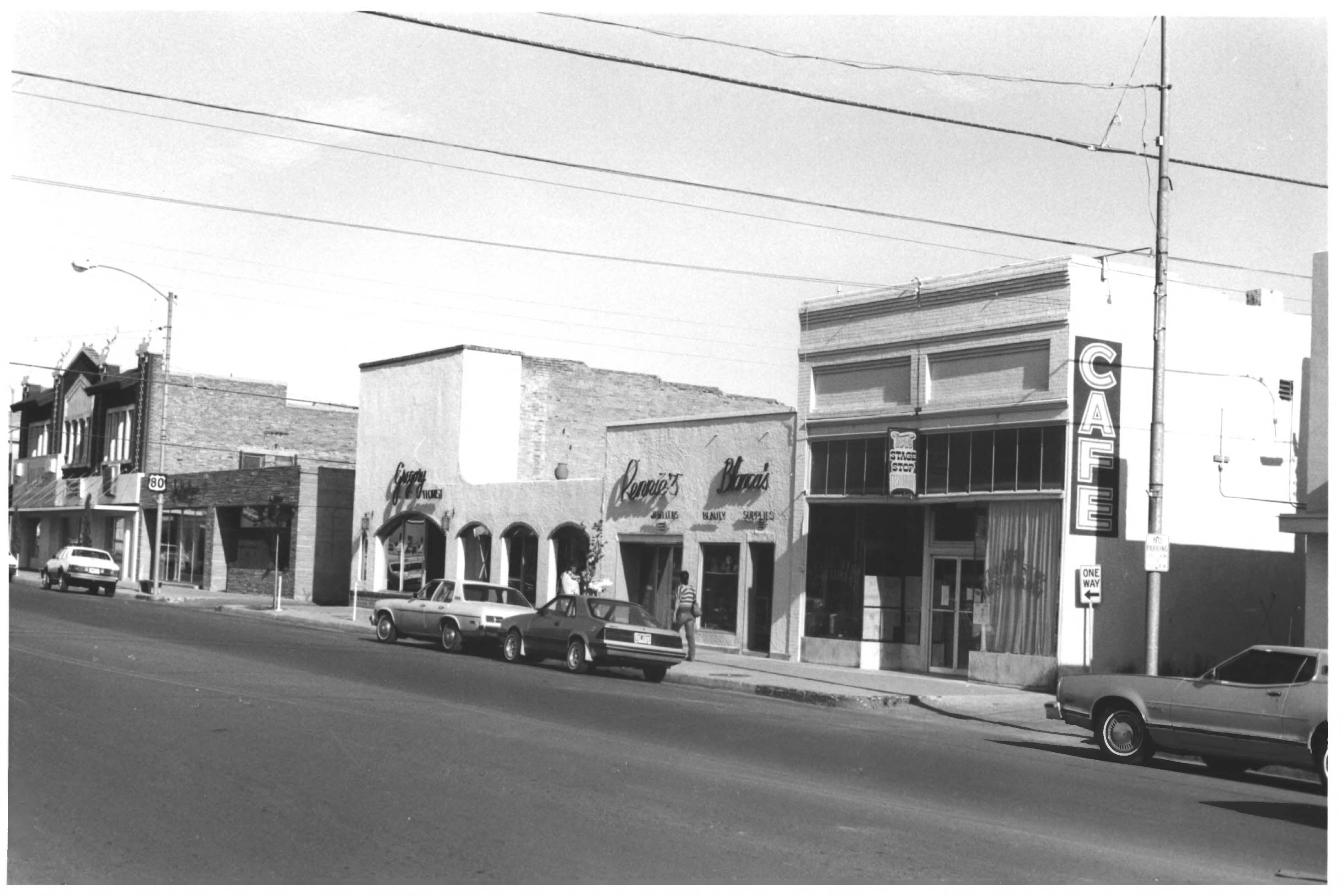
Douglas Historic District, 1984

The majority of the buildings in the district are one or two story, rectangular, commercial blocks. The Spanish Colonial Revival Gadsden Hotel, the Art Deco Airdome Theatre, the Bakery Building, the Neo-Classic Revival Post Office, and the Grand Theatre stand out as major architectural resources. The Gadsden Hotel and Grand Theatre are both individually listed on the National Register of Historic Places. Most buildings are either solid masonry or brick veneer, while others are adobe, reinforced concrete, or cast stone (rusticated concrete block). Several structures display elaborate terra cotta stone or brick ornamentation; others exhibit pressed metal ornamentation. Luxfer Prisms are utilized for transom lighting on some buildings, whereas newer 1930s and 1940s structures use glass block to a great extent.

Interspersed among the major buildings are one and two story buildings incorporating several construction techniques and exhibiting a variety of ornamental materials. The smaller and older buildings of the district, particularly the early hotels, are of adobe construction. The Samson Hotel is the district's prime example of an early adobe hotel. Solid brick, or brick veneer, over a reinforced concrete or concrete block interior wall is the most common mode of construction in the district. Terra cotta is used on several commercial buildings, particularly on the east side of the 1100 block of G Avenue. Another material common in Douglas' residential areas, but rather uncommon in the District, is rusticated concrete block, or cast stone. The Watts Hotel (D-3), the Southwestern Hotel (D-4), the Kline Block (D-33), and the Irene Building (D-34b) are the most noteworthy examples of cast stone construction in the district.

Typically, Douglas's commercial district grew with little thought of compatible land uses or visual cohesiveness, but the resulting streetscape displays an overall visual continuity. In general, smaller structures are found in the south end of the district, the 800 and 900 blocks, and in the northern portion of the linear district, the 1200, 1300, and 1400 blocks of G Avenue. The center of the district is the 1100 block dominated by the Gadsden Hotel and the Grand Theatre, which are the major visual elements of the streetscape along G Avenue. Other key structures throughout the district range widely in size, age, and design. Buildings such as the Art Deco style Bakery Building (D-58), the Neo-Classic style Brophy Building, designed by architects Trost and Trost, the Masonic Temple, Marlin's Saddle Shop built in 1905, the Hotel Douglas-Arizona Club, and the Irene Building are the major commercial structures which illustrate Douglas's historical development as well as its architectural evolution during the district's significant growth period from 1910 through 1935.

Complementing these significant buildings are numerous contributing structures, lesser in size, significance, and detail, yet still essential to the overall impact and appearance of the district. These brick, stucco, or frame buildings retain most of their original architectural characteristics with few modifications, and possess enough integrity to contribute to the overall character of the district. Of particular note throughout the district is the comparatively substantial use of sculpted terra cotta for facade ornamentation. The Grand Theatre is the dominant example due to its terra cotta facade. The 1917 date of the Grand Theatre predates the widespread use of terra cotta in the Southwest. There is also extensive terra cotta on the Airdome Theatre, designed by Trost and Trost and built circa 1925, and on the Neo-Classic style storefront of the Bank of Commerce Building at 1129 G Avenue.

Isolated throughout the district are structures which date from the historic period but which have been extensively modified or covered by contemporary sheathing. In many instances, facade restoration appears feasible, but the buildings are still considered non-contributing. The Phelps Dodge Mercantile, built in 1902-1903 and one of Douglas's most historically and architecturally significant buildings, has been encased in a modern shell; however, the interior remains largely intact, complete with pressed tin ceilings, stained wood wainscoting and balustrades, and highly polished wooden floors. Leaded and stained glass transom windows remain above the storefront entrances.

== Contributing properties ==
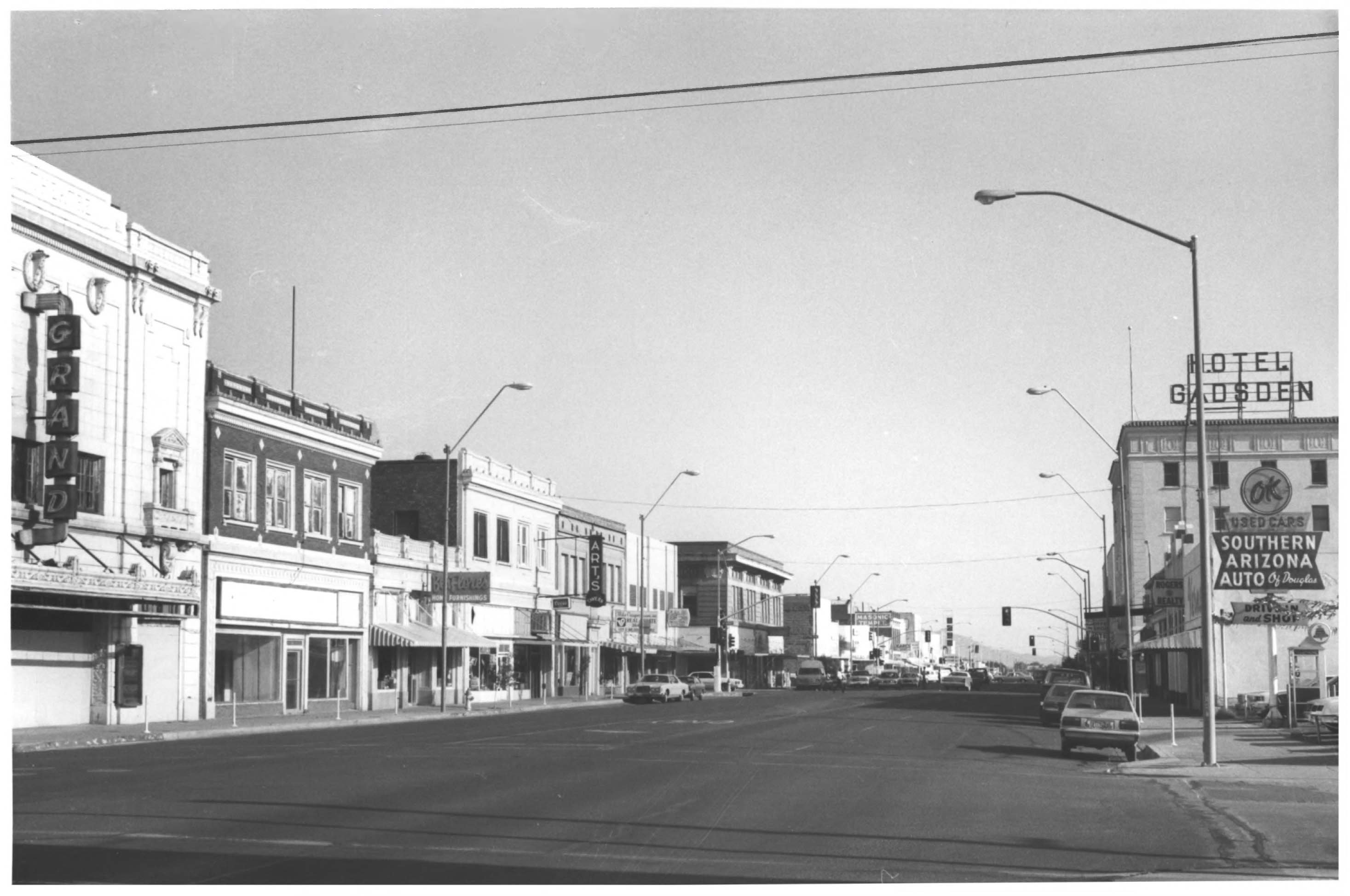
G Avenue in Douglas Historic District, 1984

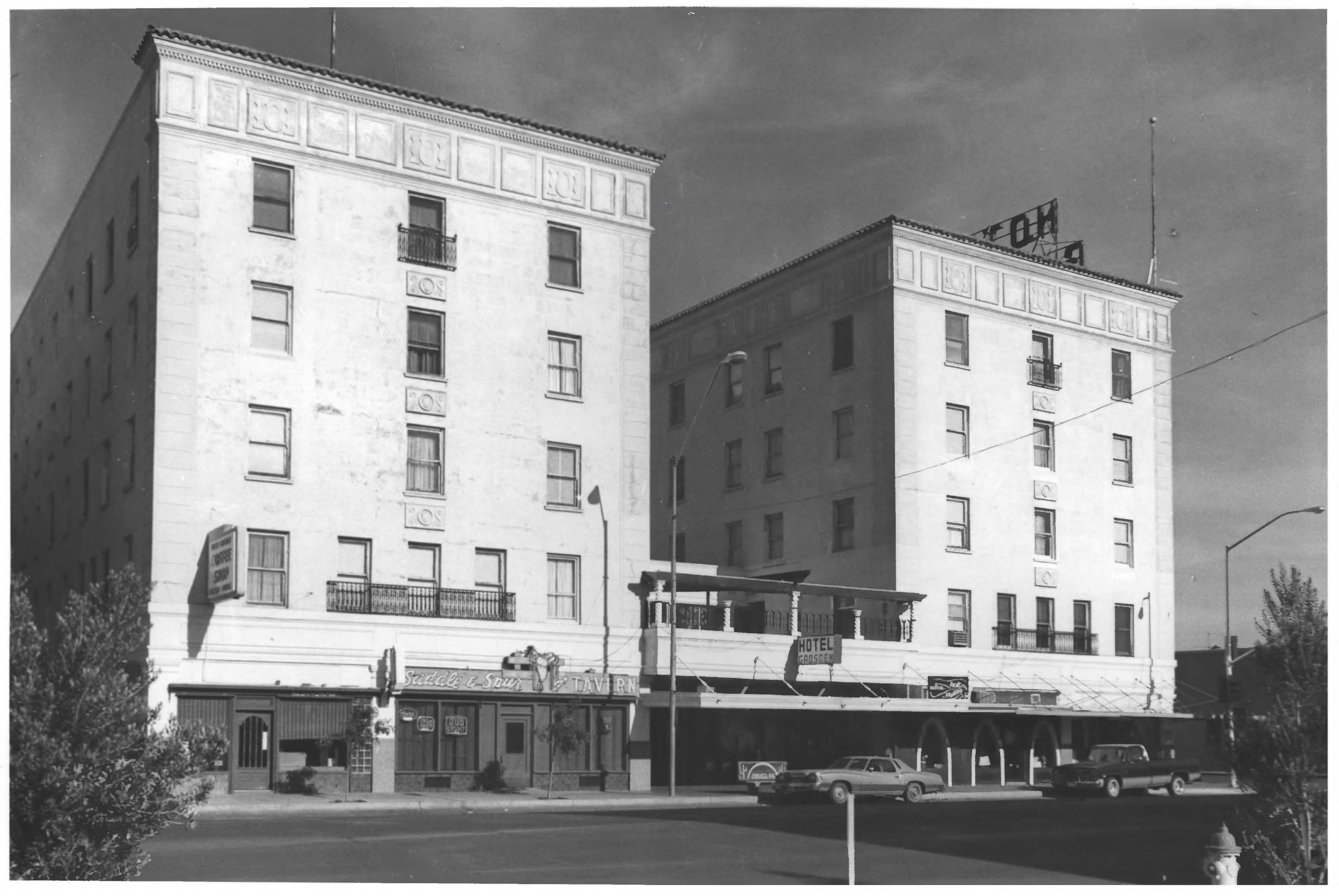
Gadsden Hotel, Douglas, Arizona 1984

Below is a table of the structures which contribute to the significance of the district.

Number	Name	Address	Construction/Modification date	Notes
1	Sociedad Mutualista de Obrera	406 8th Street	1904–9	
2	Douglas Lumber Company	450 8th Street	c. 1926	
3	Watts Hotel	516 8th Street	1906	
4	Southwestern Hotel	401 9th Street	1904–9	
8	Unknown	425 9th Street	1901–4	
9	Owl Drug Company	525 10th Street	1901–4	
13	Airdome Theatre (aka Leggett Building)	555-559 10th Street	c. 1925	
14	Douglas Post Office	601 10th Street	1915	
15	Douglas Municipal Water Department	340 llth Street	1912	
16	Odd Fellows Hall	520 llth Street	1904–9	
17	Unknown	529 llth Street	1909–14	
18	Douglas Daily Dispatch Building	530-535 llth Street	1901–4	
19	City Loan Building	531 llth Street	1909-14/1930s	
20	Vermont Hotel	536 llth Street	1914–18	
21	Unknown	416 12th Street	c. 1930	
22	Purity Ice Cream Company	420 12th Street	1904–9	
23	International Commission Company	430 12th Street	1918–20	
24	International Steam Laundry	433 12th Street	1905	
25	Buxton Smith Company	434 13th Street	1914–18	
26	Cochise Overland Auto	936 F Avenue	1914–18	
28	Unknown	809 G Avenue	1904–9	
29	Newport Hotel/Douglas Hotel	802-806 G Avenue	1904–9	
30	Unknown	812 G Avenue	1904–9	
33	Kline Block	833 G Avenue	c. 1904	
34-a	Douglas Furniture and Outfitting	818 G Avenue	1904–9	
34-b	Irene Building	834 G Avenue	c. 1904–5	
35	Unknown	836 G Avenue	1901–9	
36	Post Office Block	842-844 G Avenue	1901–4	
37-b	Unknown	919 G Avenue	1904–9	
39	Unknown	919 G Avenue	c. 1925	
40	Unknown	922 G Avenue	1920s	
41	Unknown	924 G Avenue	c. 1904/1930s	
42	Masonic Lodge	925-931 G Avenue	1907	
43	Unknown	930 G Avenue	1905	
49	Unknown	1009 G Avenue	1904–9	
52	Brophy Building	1033-1055 G Avenue	1906–7	
53	Hotel Gadsden	1046 G Avenue	1929	
55	Unknown	1106-1110 G Avenue	1901–4	
57	Hotel Hadden	1109-1113 G Avenue	c. 1906	
58	Unknown	1116 G Avenue	c. 1930	
59	Unknown	1119 G Avenue	c. 1920	
61	Bank of Commerce	1129 G Avenue	c. 1920	
63	Unknown	1133 G Avenue	1915–29	
64	Grand Theatre	1145 G Avenue	1919	
65	Southern Arizona Auto Company	1200 G Avenue	c. 1925	
66	Winton Hotel	1201 G Avenue	c. 1919	
68	Unknown	1225 G Avenue	1909-14/1930s	
70	Unknown	1237 G Avenue	1909–14	
72	Reay Transfer	1320 G Avenue	1914–18	
75	Copper Cities Motor Company	1341 G Avenue	c. 1926	
76	Samson Hotel	1401 G Avenue	1901–4	
77-a,b	Avenue Hotel	1415 G Avenue	1904–9	
79	Arizona Edison Company Ice House	12th Street & Pan American Ave	1914–29	
