= Cloudcroft, New Mexico =

Village in Otero County, New Mexico, United States

- Village
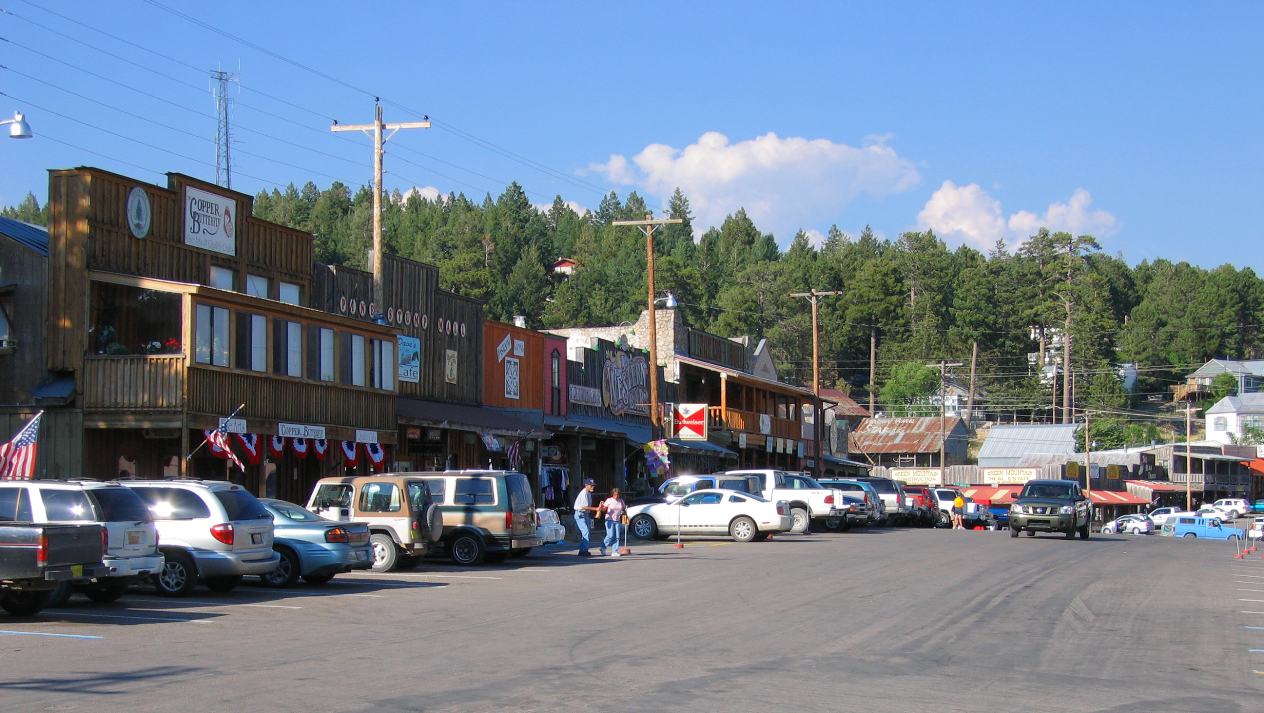
- Cloudcroft in the summer

- Location of Cloudcroft, New Mexico

- Location in the United States
- Coordinates: 32°57′11″N 105°43′57″W
- Country: United States
- State: New Mexico
- County: Otero

Area
  - Total: 1.64 sq mi (4.24 km^{2})
  - Land: 1.64 sq mi (4.24 km^{2})
  - Water: 0 sq mi (0.00 km^{2})
- Elevation: 8,676 ft (2,644 m)

Population (2020)
  - Total: 750
  - Density: 460/sq mi (177/km^{2})
- Time zone: UTC-7 (Mountain (MST))
  - Summer (DST): UTC-6 (MDT)
- ZIP codes: 88317, 88350
- Area code: 575
- FIPS code: 35-16280
- GNIS feature ID: 2413541
- Website: cloudcroftvillage.com

Cloudcroft is a village in Otero County, New Mexico, United States, and is located within the Lincoln National Forest. The population was 750 at the 2020 census.

Its high elevation of 8,676 feet (2,644 m) allows for a mild summer, and the forested mountains make it a tourist attraction for the surrounding deserts. Tourism is the primary economy of the village.

== History ==
In the 1890s, the El Paso and Northeastern Railroad, organized by brothers Charles Bishop Eddy and John Arthur Eddy, arrived in the newly founded town of Alamogordo intending to continue the rail line north to the mining town of White Oaks and beyond. This required a steady supply of timber. In 1898 the Eddy brothers sent a survey crew into the Sacramento Mountains to determine the feasibility of extending a line up the summit to harvest the forests. The crew reported that not only was it possible, but the area could attract visitors. The name of Cloudcroft – a pasture for the clouds – was suggested and work on the line soon began.

By the end of the year, the rail line had been extended as far as Toboggan Canyon, and construction was started on a pavilion at the summit to provide accommodations for the anticipated tourists. It consisted of a dining room, kitchen, parlor, entertainment hall, and 40 tents set on wooden platforms. In May 1899 the railroad reached Cox Canyon and in June 1899, "The Pavilion" was formally opened by John Eddy. The first visitors rode the train as far as Toboggan and finished the journey by stagecoach. Favorable reports in newspapers quickly made Cloudcroft a popular destination. An additional resort, The Lodge, was built as a more upscale alternative to The Pavilion. The rail line arrived in Cloudcroft in early 1900, and in June 1900 the train depot was finished, located just west of The Pavilion. Meeting the trains became a daily activity in the village, with three arriving each day, bringing lumber, mail, and passengers.

In 1909, The Lodge burned down; it was rebuilt at its present location in 1911. The Pavilion also burned twice in the 1920s, but was rebuilt each time to conform to the original plans. The Lodge at Cloudcroft hosted numerous notable guests, and in the 1930s, was managed by Conrad Hilton.

As automobiles grew in popularity, the rail line began to lose money. Passenger service ended in 1938, and the last freight train ran in 1947. The extant Mexican Canyon Trestle of the now defunct rail line is located near Cloudcroft.

In 2010, fire destroyed two downtown buildings and caused smoke damage to other businesses in downtown Cloudcroft.

== Geography ==
According to the United States Census Bureau, the village has a total area of 1.63 square miles (4.2 km^{2}), all land.

=== Climate ===
Cloudcroft has a humid continental climate (Köppen: Dfb). It is the southernmost town area on the North American continent with a climatic continental subtype.

Climate data for Cloudcroft, New Mexico, 1991–2020 normals, extremes 1987–present
| Month | Jan | Feb | Mar | Apr | May | Jun | Jul | Aug | Sep | Oct | Nov | Dec | Year |
|---|---|---|---|---|---|---|---|---|---|---|---|---|---|
| Record high °F (°C) | 62 (17) | 65 (18) | 75 (24) | 75 (24) | 83 (28) | 88 (31) | 88 (31) | 84 (29) | 80 (27) | 76 (24) | 68 (20) | 69 (21) | 88 (31) |
| Mean maximum °F (°C) | 53.7 (12.1) | 56.0 (13.3) | 62.6 (17.0) | 67.7 (19.8) | 76.0 (24.4) | 82.8 (28.2) | 80.9 (27.2) | 77.7 (25.4) | 75.2 (24.0) | 70.1 (21.2) | 62.3 (16.8) | 55.5 (13.1) | 83.9 (28.8) |
| Mean daily maximum °F (°C) | 42.4 (5.8) | 44.6 (7.0) | 50.8 (10.4) | 58.0 (14.4) | 65.9 (18.8) | 74.3 (23.5) | 72.2 (22.3) | 70.8 (21.6) | 67.3 (19.6) | 60.1 (15.6) | 50.6 (10.3) | 42.8 (6.0) | 58.3 (14.6) |
| Daily mean °F (°C) | 30.7 (−0.7) | 33.2 (0.7) | 38.2 (3.4) | 44.6 (7.0) | 52.0 (11.1) | 59.6 (15.3) | 60.1 (15.6) | 59.1 (15.1) | 54.8 (12.7) | 47.1 (8.4) | 38.0 (3.3) | 31.1 (−0.5) | 45.7 (7.6) |
| Mean daily minimum °F (°C) | 19.0 (−7.2) | 21.7 (−5.7) | 25.6 (−3.6) | 31.2 (−0.4) | 38.1 (3.4) | 44.8 (7.1) | 48.0 (8.9) | 47.4 (8.6) | 42.2 (5.7) | 34.0 (1.1) | 25.5 (−3.6) | 19.4 (−7.0) | 33.1 (0.6) |
| Mean minimum °F (°C) | 4.0 (−15.6) | 5.3 (−14.8) | 11.3 (−11.5) | 17.6 (−8.0) | 26.3 (−3.2) | 35.9 (2.2) | 42.0 (5.6) | 41.0 (5.0) | 32.5 (0.3) | 20.9 (−6.2) | 9.5 (−12.5) | 1.9 (−16.7) | −1.6 (−18.7) |
| Record low °F (°C) | −9 (−23) | −20 (−29) | 4 (−16) | 11 (−12) | 17 (−8) | 28 (−2) | 37 (3) | 34 (1) | 26 (−3) | 5 (−15) | −4 (−20) | −11 (−24) | −20 (−29) |
| Average precipitation inches (mm) | 1.59 (40) | 1.69 (43) | 1.45 (37) | 0.85 (22) | 1.22 (31) | 2.22 (56) | 5.53 (140) | 5.01 (127) | 3.23 (82) | 2.13 (54) | 1.38 (35) | 2.15 (55) | 28.45 (722) |
| Average snowfall inches (cm) | 13.1 (33) | 13.3 (34) | 9.8 (25) | 3.7 (9.4) | 0.1 (0.25) | 0.0 (0.0) | 0.0 (0.0) | 0.0 (0.0) | 0.0 (0.0) | 3.2 (8.1) | 7.3 (19) | 16.3 (41) | 66.8 (169.75) |
| Average extreme snow depth inches (cm) | 9.4 (24) | 9.3 (24) | 6.0 (15) | 1.4 (3.6) | 0.0 (0.0) | 0.0 (0.0) | 0.0 (0.0) | 0.0 (0.0) | 0.0 (0.0) | 1.7 (4.3) | 4.1 (10) | 11.2 (28) | 11.2 (28) |
| Average precipitation days (≥ 0.01 in) | 5.7 | 6.0 | 5.6 | 3.5 | 4.9 | 9.1 | 16.7 | 15.9 | 10.0 | 6.4 | 4.2 | 5.9 | 93.9 |
| Average snowy days (≥ 0.1 in) | 4.7 | 4.3 | 3.9 | 1.3 | 0.0 | 0.0 | 0.0 | 0.0 | 0.0 | 1.0 | 2.4 | 4.9 | 22.5 |
Source: NOAA

== Demographics ==
Historical population
| Census | Pop. | Note | %± |
|---|---|---|---|
| 1950 | 251 | | — |
| 1960 | 464 | | 84.9% |
| 1970 | 525 | | 13.1% |
| 1980 | 521 | | −0.8% |
| 1990 | 636 | | 22.1% |
| 2000 | 749 | | 17.8% |
| 2010 | 675 | | −9.9% |
| 2020 | 750 | | 11.1% |
U.S. Decennial Census

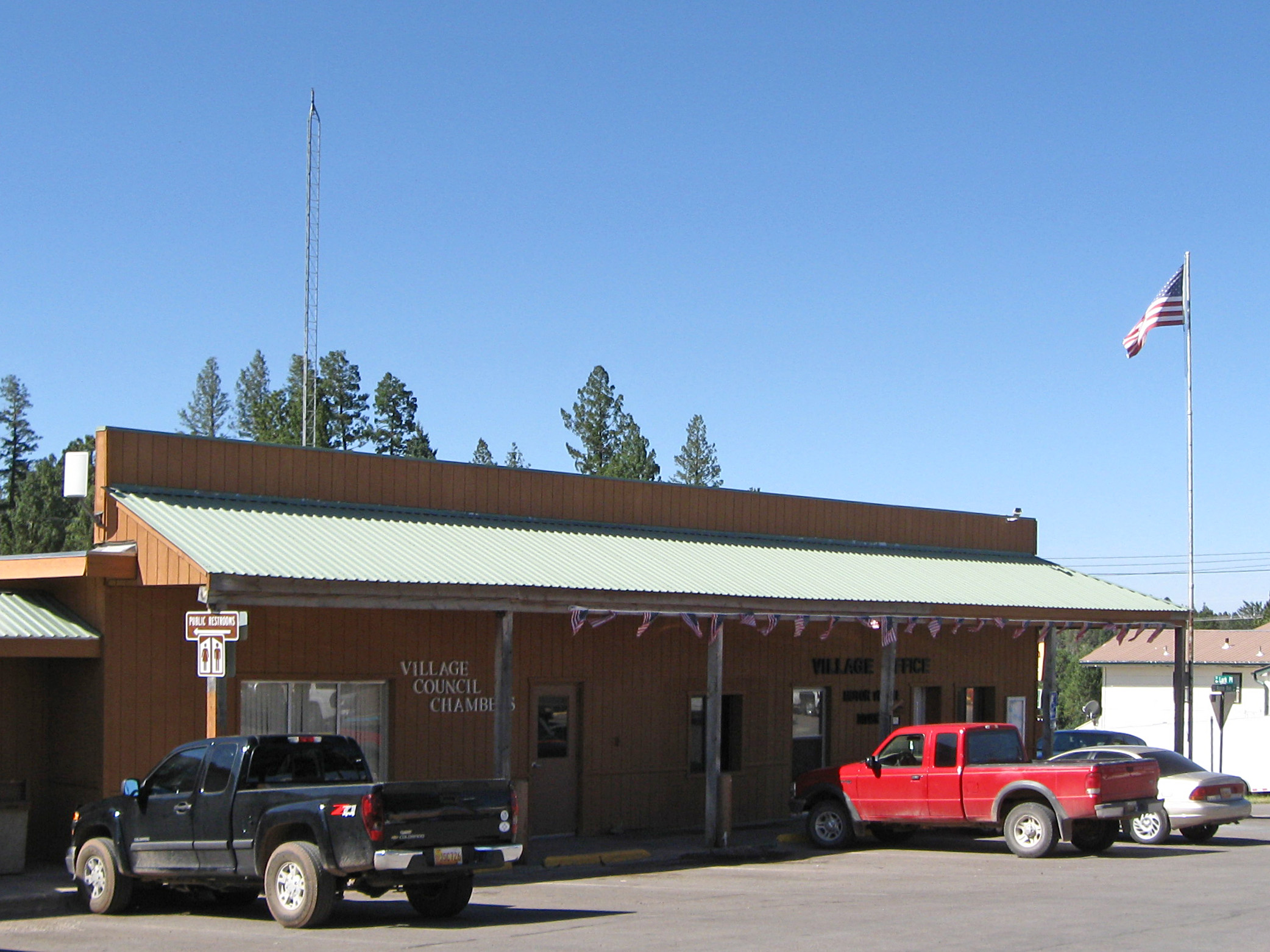
Cloudcroft Village Office

=== 2020 census ===
The 2020 United States census counted 750 people, 348 households, and 228 families in Cloudcroft. The population density was 458.4 inhabitants per square mile (177.0/km^{2}). There were 851 housing units at an average density of 520.2 per square mile (200.9/km^{2}). The racial makeup was 85.23% (619) white or European American (78.27% non-Hispanic white), 0.53% (4) black or African-American, 0.93% (7) Native American or Alaska Native, 0.13% (1) Asian, 0.0% (0) Pacific Islander or Native Hawaiian, 4.13% (31) from other races, and 11.73% (88) from two or more races. Hispanic or Latino of any race was 14.0% (105) of the population.

Of the 348 households, 28.4% had children under the age of 18; 50.0% were married couples living together; 23.0% had a female householder with no spouse or partner present. 31.0% of households consisted of individuals and 16.1% had someone living alone who was 65 years of age or older. The average household size was 2.6 and the average family size was 4.3. The percent of those with a bachelor's degree or higher was estimated to be 19.1% of the population.

20.7% of the population was under the age of 18, 4.1% from 18 to 24, 17.2% from 25 to 44, 30.0% from 45 to 64, and 28.0% who were 65 years of age or older. The median age was 53.2 years. For every 100 females, there were 97.4 males. For every 100 females ages 18 and older, there were 95.7 males.

The 2016–2020 5-year American Community Survey estimates show that the median household income was $32,165 (with a margin of error of +/- $12,500) and the median family income was $56,696 (+/- $25,349). Males had a median income of $36,429 (+/- $12,318) versus $8,656 (+/- $943) for females. The median income for those above 16 years old was $13,088 (+/- $11,732). Approximately, 29.3% of families and 40.3% of the population were below the poverty line, including 68.3% of those under the age of 18 and 12.9% of those ages 65 or over.

=== 2000 census ===
As of the census of 2000, there were 749 people, 320 households, and 224 families residing in the village. The population density was 500.2 inhabitants per square mile (193.1/km^{2}). There were 920 housing units at an average density of 614.4 per square mile (237.2/km^{2}). The racial makeup of the village was 90.66% White, 0.80% Native American, 0.53% Asian, 3.47% from other races, and 2.54% from two or more races. Hispanic or Latino of any race were 14.59% of the population.

There were 320 households, out of which 29.7% had children under the age of 18 living with them, 58.1% were married couples living together, 7.8% had a female householder with no husband present, and 30.0% were non-families. 26.3% of all households were made up of individuals, and 8.4% had someone living alone who was 65 years of age or older. The average household size was 2.34 and the average family size was 2.82.

In the village, the population was spread out, with 24.3% under the age of 18, 4.5% from 18 to 24, 24.4% from 25 to 44, 31.4% from 45 to 64, and 15.4% who were 65 years of age or older. The median age was 43 years. For every 100 females, there were 98.1 males. For every 100 females age 18 and over, there were 96.2 males.

The median income for a household in the village was $40,795, and the median income for a family was $52,292. Males had a median income of $40,750 versus $27,083 for females. The per capita income for the village was $21,301. About 8.7% of families and 9.9% of the population were below the poverty line, including 14.0% of those under age 18 and 5.2% of those age 65 or over.

== Arts and culture ==
Festivals at Zenith Park in Cloudcroft include May Fair, on the Memorial Day Weekend, July Jamboree, and Oktoberfest.

Buildings in Cloudcroft include shops, restaurants, a chapel, gas station, general store, dispensaries, and a museum with artifacts and vintage photos of Cloudcroft's history.

Artists of many disciplines live, work, and sell their work in the village.

== Education ==
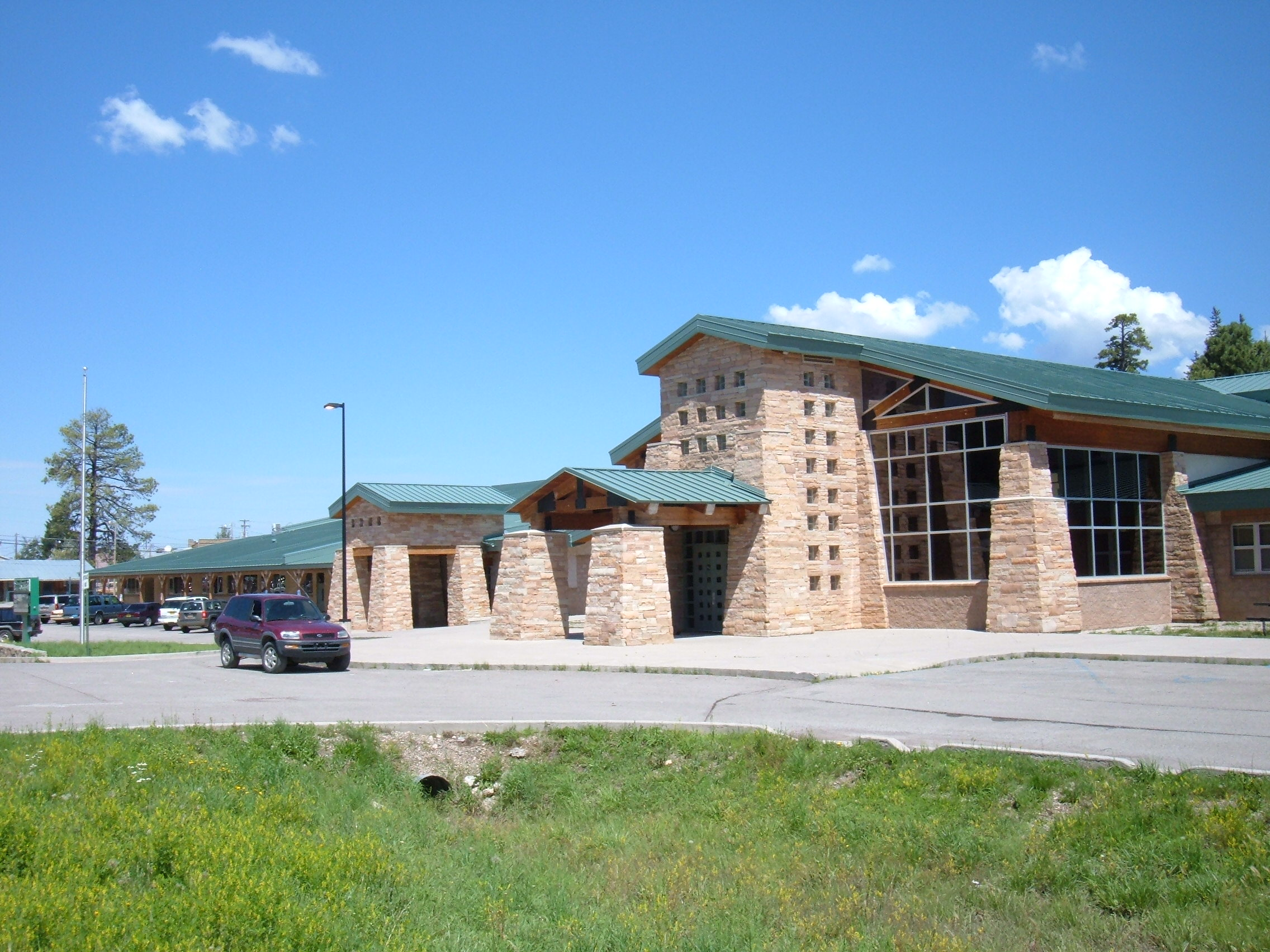
School facility

Cloudcroft is the headquarters of the Cloudcroft Municipal Schools, which also serve other nearby communities.

== Infrastructure ==
- U.S. Route 82

== Notable people ==
- Ronny Cox, actor, singer, songwriter, and storyteller

== See also ==
- Cloudcroft Observatory
- List of municipalities in New Mexico
