= 1969 Huckleby Mercury Poisoning =

Mercury poisoning incident in New Mexico

The 1969 Huckleby Mercury Poisoning was an incident in which American farmer Ernest Huckleby unwittingly fed his livestock grain contaminated with mercury, resulting in his family's poisoning after the consumption of one such hog they cooked and ate for dinner. His 8-year-old daughter, Ernestine Huckleby, was impacted most severely, becoming blind and quadriplegic; her photograph was later featured in the 1971 National Geographic publication As We Live and Breathe: The Challenge of Our Environment.

== Consumption of Mercury-treated grain ==
In 1969, Ernest Huckleby of Alamogordo, New Mexico, purchased grain from the Golden West Seed Company to feed his livestock. As part of his purchase, he was also given a portion of "waste" grain that included seeds treated with a mercuric fungicide. These seeds were dyed pink to indicate their toxicity, a warning to which Huckleby was not made privy.

The poisoning occurred after he served contaminated pork to his wife, who was 3 months pregnant, and his 8 children. Several of Huckleby's hogs had appeared to be ill, rousing suspicions that they were suffering from what farmers called the "blind staggers"; however, the hog Huckleby fed to his family appeared to be unaffected, leading him to believe it would be safe to eat.

Within 3 months, the children had developed "ataxia, agitation, visual impairment, and impaired consciousness." When born, baby Michael was severely neurologically impaired, blind, subject to convulsive seizures, and only minimally aware of his environment. Ernestine, 8 years old, became blind, unable to sit unsupported or to roll over, unable to hold objects, incontinent and unable to speak. Amos, 13 years old, became functionally blind, with sensory degradation and impaired coordination. Dorothy Jean Huckleby, 20 years old, suffered from tunnel vision, slurred speech, impaired coordination and numbness and tingling in her extremities. Mr. and Mrs. Huckleby were unaffected, which corresponds well with current medical findings that methylmercury is more dangerous to the developing nervous system of infants and children, but, for reasons the doctors did not understand, 4 of the Huckleby's 8 children—all of whom shared the meal—were unaffected.

Of the 4 children that were affected, Dorothy Jean and Amos were hospitalized in a rehabilitation center in Roswell, New Mexico for 18 months. When she had entered the facility, Dorothy had not been able to stand or use her arms or legs; she had no control over her bowels or bladder, and was unable to speak. After 18 months in the facility, she had regained most of her function, a recovery her doctors and the press lauded as "miraculous." Upon his own release, Amos was blind and in a wheelchair, his speech significantly impaired. Baby Michael was born blind, with profound physical and mental disabilities.

Ernestine was placed in Gerald Champion Memorial Hospital in Alamogordo, where she remained comatose for over a year. When she emerged from the coma, she was blind and quadriplegic; it was reported that "She may never understand what has happened to her."

== Photograph ==
Ernestine Huckleby, 8 years old, became "the face of methylmercury poisoning" in the early 1970s after her photograph was featured in the 1971 National Geographic publication As We Live and Breathe: the Challenge of Our Environment. The striking image of Ernestine, a wide-eyed little Black girl clutching a teddy bear, captured hearts across the nation. The photographer, James P. Blair, has said that "Of all the assignments I have had over the 35 years I was a staff photographer for the Society, this was one of the saddest."

== Campaign ==
Dorothy Jean later sued the Federal government alleging the government was negligent in oversight of the warning label on the treated seed as the label was insufficient to apprise the Golden West Seed Company of the possibility of food-chain poisoning. She was unsuccessful. The judge expressed his regret that in following the law, he was not able to reach a finding in Dorothy Jean's favor. Most countries had restricted the use of organic mercurial fungicides in reaction to similar poisonings, but legal maneuvers stalled the de-registration of organo-mercurial fungicides in the United States, and it continued to be used as a seed treatment for some time. That use was still ongoing at least 10 years later as evidenced by the experience of a Yakima, Washington family whose home flock of chickens was contaminated through feeding of seed grain treated with a mercurial fungicide.

== Death of Ernestine ==
Ernestine, who had been 8 years old when she was poisoned, suffered from quadriplegia, blindness, and severe mental retardation until her death at the age of 30. An autopsy conducted showed cortical atrophy, neuronal loss, and gliosis, most pronounced in the paracentral and parietooccipital regions. Massive amounts of inorganic mercury were discovered in her brain, a fact which led researchers to conclude, "Since inorganic mercury crosses the blood-brain barrier poorly, biotransformation of methyl to inorganic mercury may have occurred after methylmercury crossed the blood-brain barrier, accounting for its persistence in brain and causing part of the brain damage."
