= VP8 (disambiguation) =

VP8 is a video compression format owned by Google and created by On2 Technologies.

VP8 may also refer to:

- VP8 Image Analyzer, an analog computer made in 1972
- VP-8, Patrol Squadron Eight, a U.S. Navy land-based patrol squadron
- VP8, a viral protein; for example VP8* in Rotavirus
