= Huckleby =

Huckleby is a surname. Notable people with the surname include:

- Ernestine Huckleby (fl. 1960s–1970s), American victim of accidental mercury poisoning
- Harlan Huckleby (born 1957), American football player
