= Deutsche Schule Alamogordo =

International school in Alamogordo, New Mexico

Coordinates: 32°56′15″N 105°57′12″W

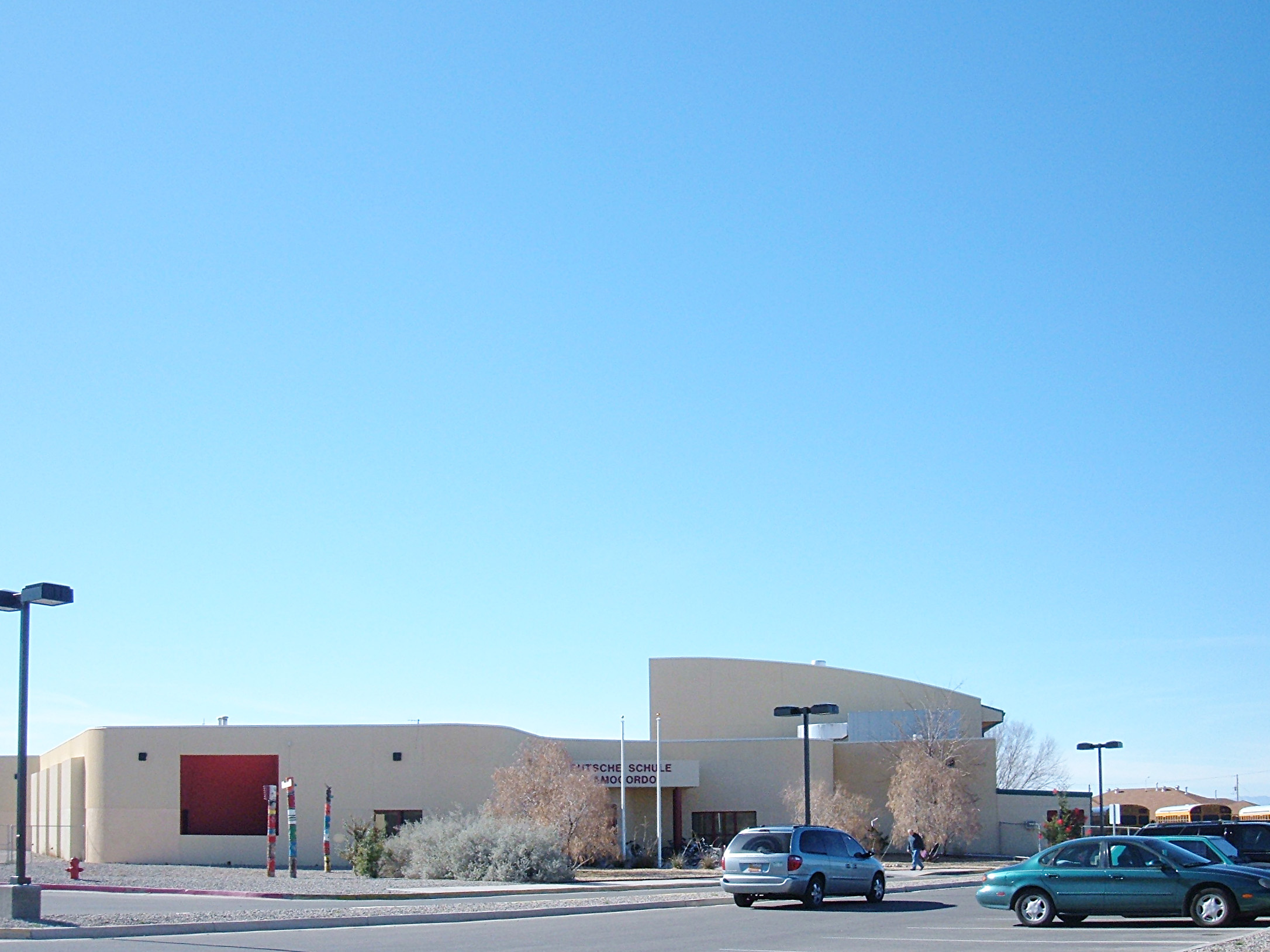
Deutsche Schule Alamogordo

Deutsche Schule Alamogordo was a German international school in Alamogordo, New Mexico. It was operated by the German government and was the largest such school not operated within Germany. Most of the students had parents in the German Air Force stationed at Holloman Air Force Base. It had multiple educational tracks seen in education in Germany.

== History ==
The German school itself opened circa 1996, using classrooms of the Buena Vista Elementary School. Starting the new school year in the late summer of 2000, the teachers and students moved into the newly built school building which can be seen on the top of this article.

In 1997 it had grades 1–4. By 2003 it had grades 1–10, and that year it had 180 students. In 2016 it had 140 students and Torsten Reinecke was the principal. As the German military was scheduled to leave Holloman Air Base in 2019, the school was to close then. Upon the school's closing in 2019 the facility became the Imago Dei School. Imago Dei Academy, a Christian school, formally opened its current campus on August 2, 2019.
