= Monica Kim Garza =

American painter (born 1988)

- Born: 1988 (age 37–38); Alamogordo, New Mexico, U.S.
- Education: California College of the Arts (BFA)
- Occupation: Painter

Monica Kim Garza (born 1988) is an American painter.

== Biography ==
Monica Kim Garza was born in Alamogordo New Mexico to a Korean mother and a Mexican father. She grew up in Georgia and obtained a Bachelor of Fine Arts (BFA) degree in painting and drawing from the California College of the Arts in San Francisco. She is known for her paintings of carefree ethnically ambiguous women, sometimes nude, sometimes clothed. contemporary portraits and sculptures. In 2025, two of her paintings were acquired but the Musee de’ Arte Moderne Paris.

== Notable work ==
- From June 24, 2022 to January 7, 2023, Monica Kim Garza’s painting If You Like Piña Coladas was featured in the exhibition, i know you are, but what am i? (De)Framing Identity and the Body at the Utah Museum of Contemporary Art.
- Monica Kim Garza’s artwork was exhibited along with 56 other artists in the exhibition A Very Anxious Feeling: Voices of Unrest in the American Experience at the Taubman Museum of Art, in Roanoke, Virginia, from October 3, 2020 to February 7, 2021.
- In 2021, Monica Kim Garza had her first solo exhibition in New York called Baguettes at the Hole.
- Monica Kim Garza was featured in the exhibition NSFW: Female Gaze, from June 21, 2017 to November 11, 2018, at the Museum of Sex in New York.
