= The Toy Train Depot =

Coordinates: 32°54′50.59″N 105°57′38.75″W

The Toy Train Depot is a toy store and railway museum, featuring scale models of train locomotives and passenger and freight cars, in Alamogordo, New Mexico.

The Toy Train Depot is also home to America's Park Ride Train Museum, which runs the Alamogordo/Alameda Park Narrow Gauge Railway, a working, 16 in (406 mm) gauge miniature railway that visitors can ride for a nominal fee. The store and museum are non-profit, and are run by the Toy Train Depot Foundation.

In January 2007 the Alamogordo McDonald's donated their Ronald's Railroad, full-sized, standard-gauge caboose to the museum. The caboose is now in a high-visibility location on US-54/70, alerting potential visitors to the museum's location.

Guided tours by volunteer docents are available upon request.

== The Toy Train Depot's building ==
The building that houses the museum began its life in 1898 as a working train depot in Torrance, New Mexico at the junction of the New Mexico Central Railroad and the El Paso and Northeastern Railroad. Later, the building was moved to Corona, New Mexico, where it remained for 75 years, serving the Rock Island and Southern Pacific railroads. The building retains its original stamped tin ceiling tiles as well its dispatcher's bay window.

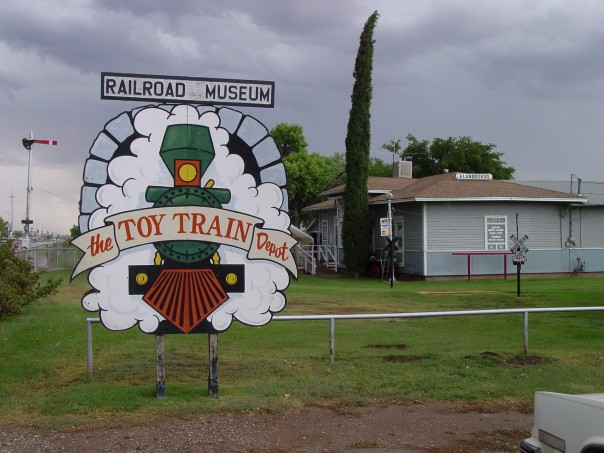
The Toy Train Depot is located in Alamogordo, New Mexico

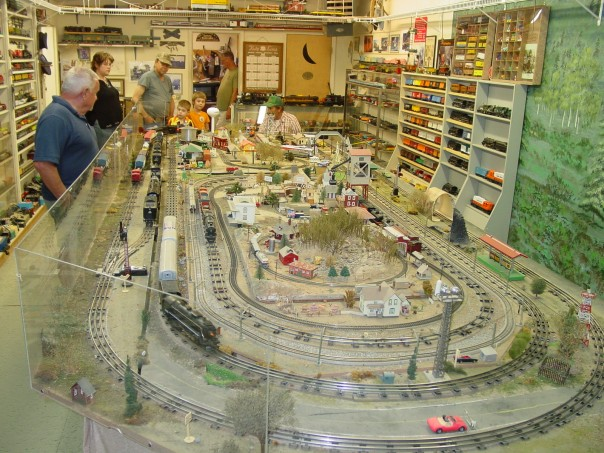
The museum specializes in displays of scale model and toy rail line equipment

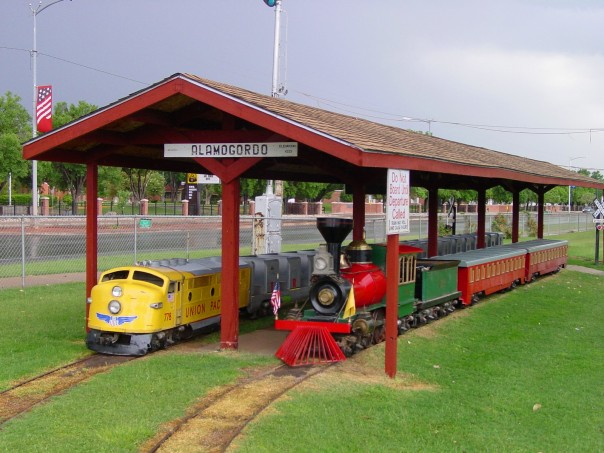
Visitors can ride on the trains dedicated to America's Park Train Ride Museum, also part of the Toy Train Depot

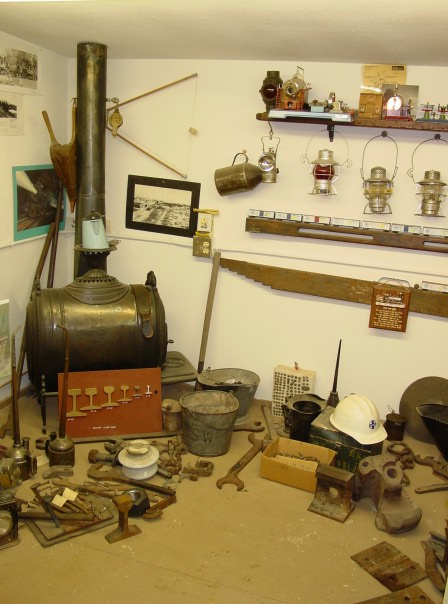
Historical artifacts and ephemera are also on display within the Toy Train Depot's original train depot building

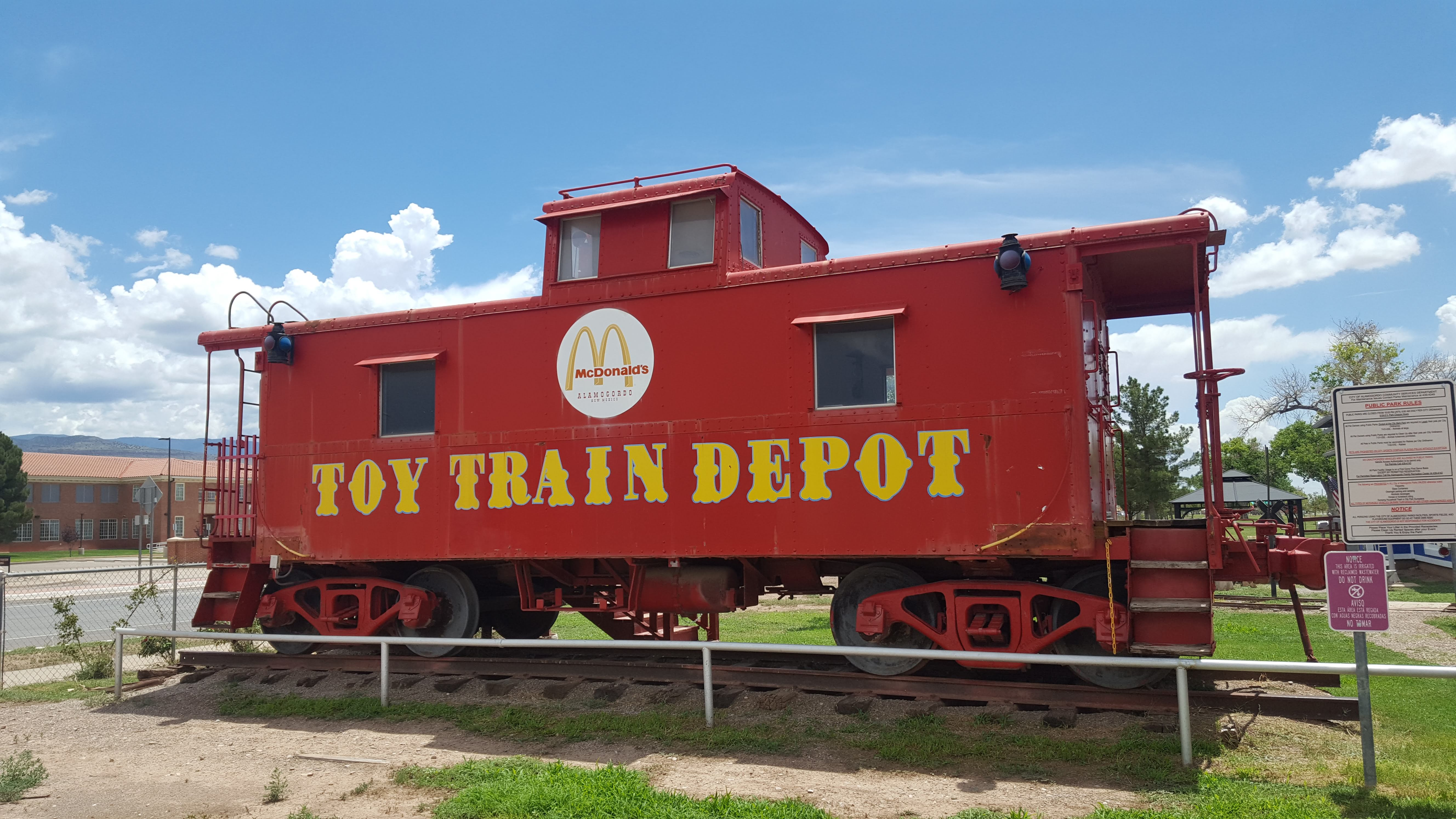
A caboose at the Toy Train Depot in July 2022

== See also ==
- Rail Transport Modelling
