= Alamogordo, New Mexico =

- City
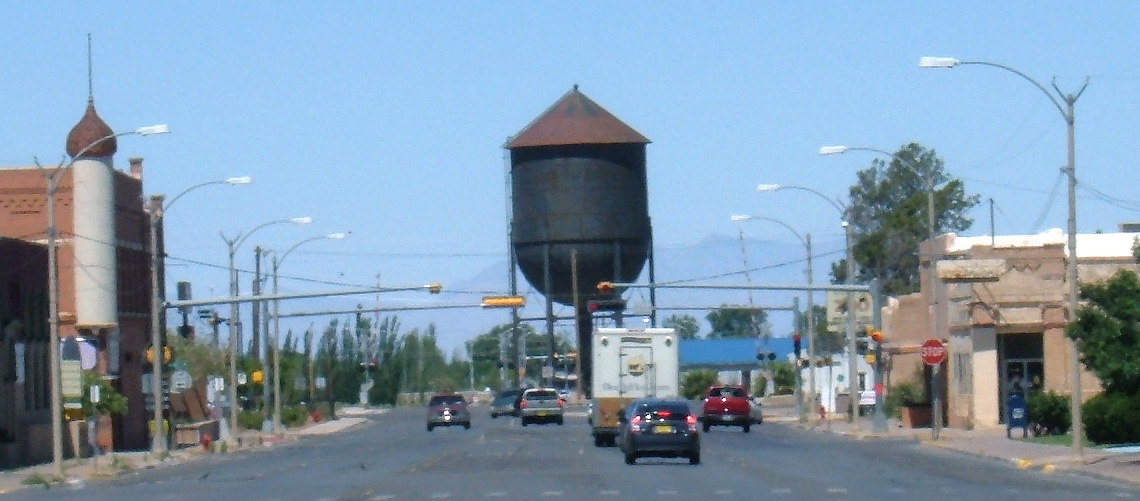
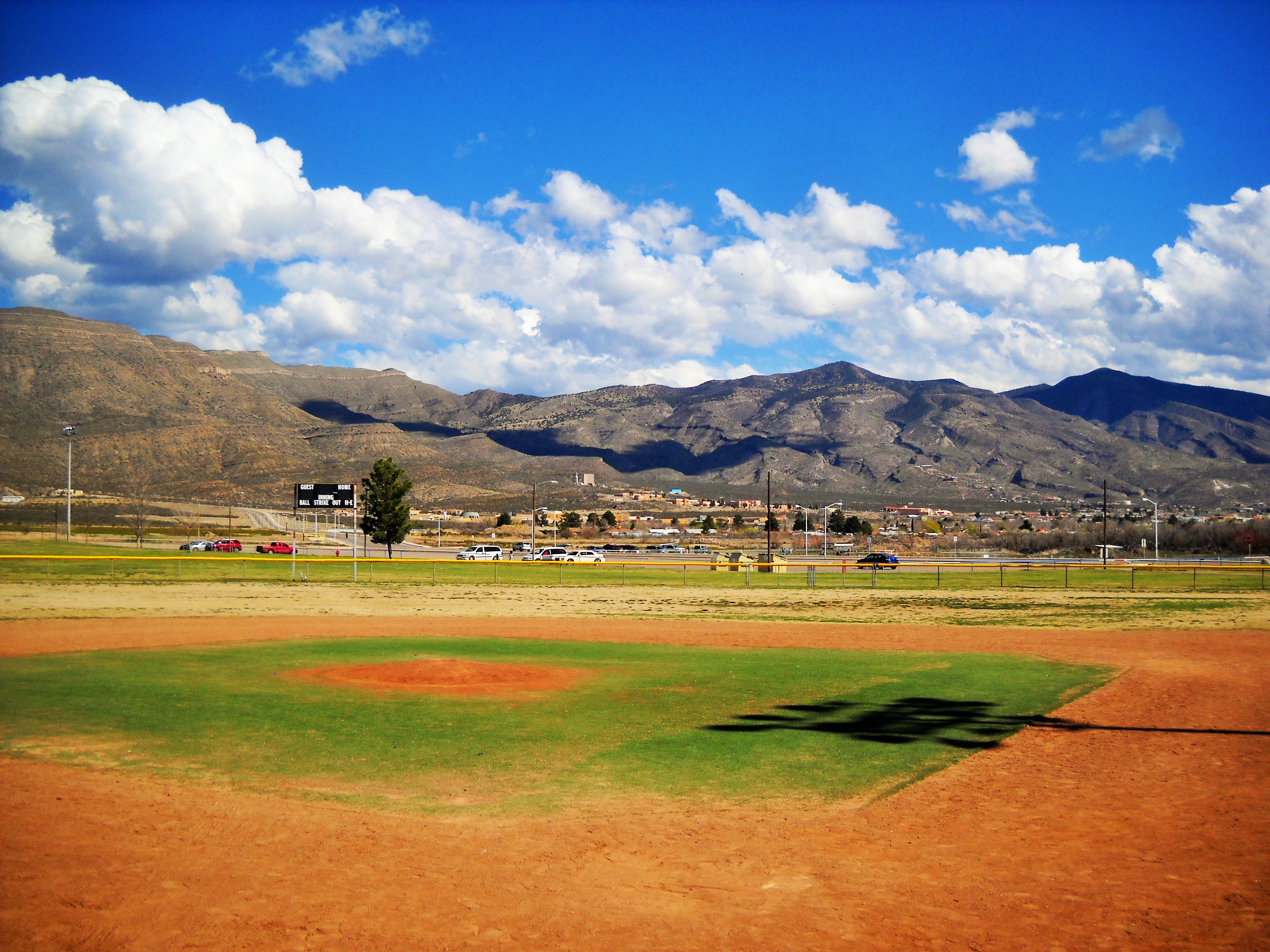
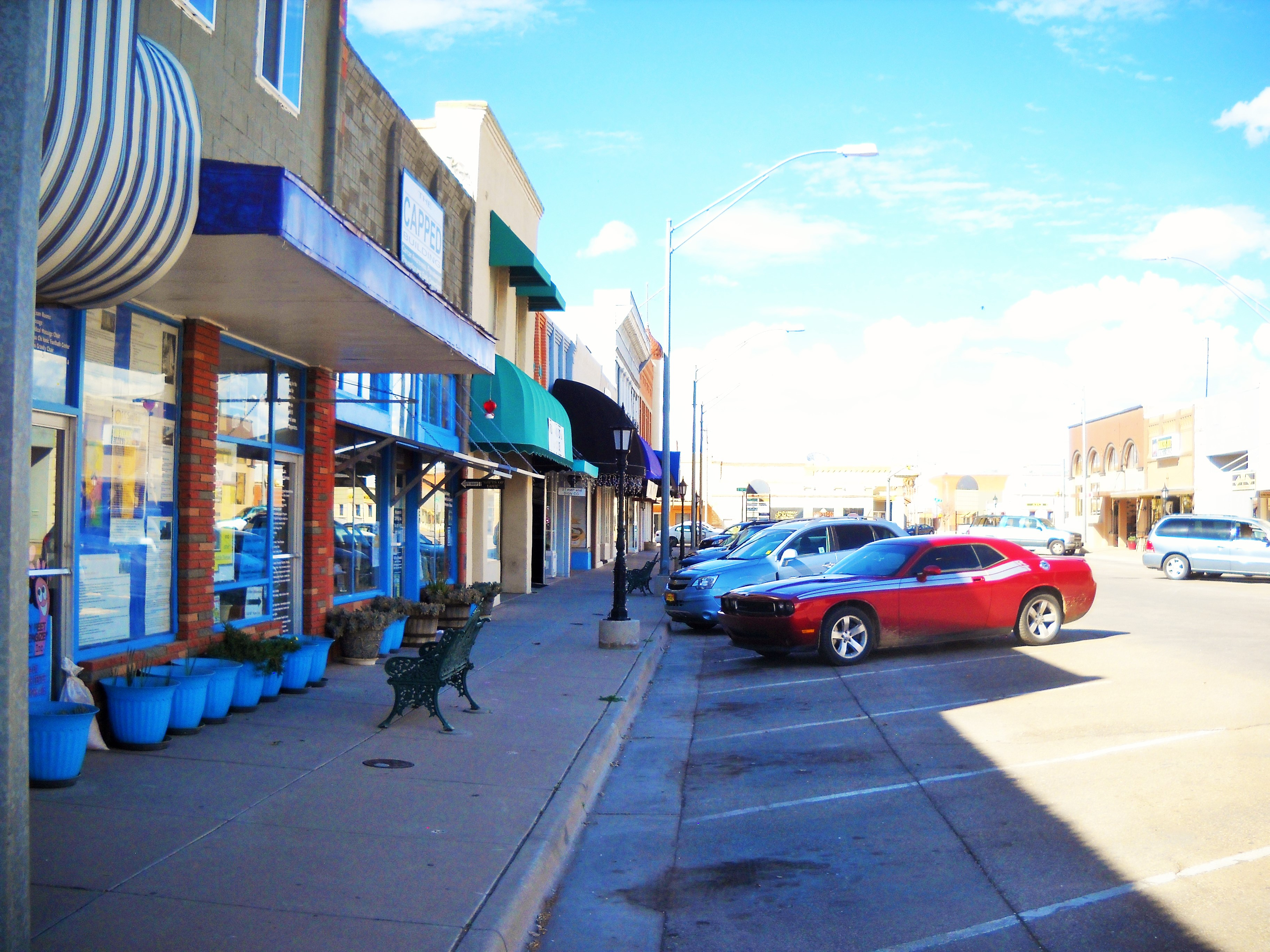
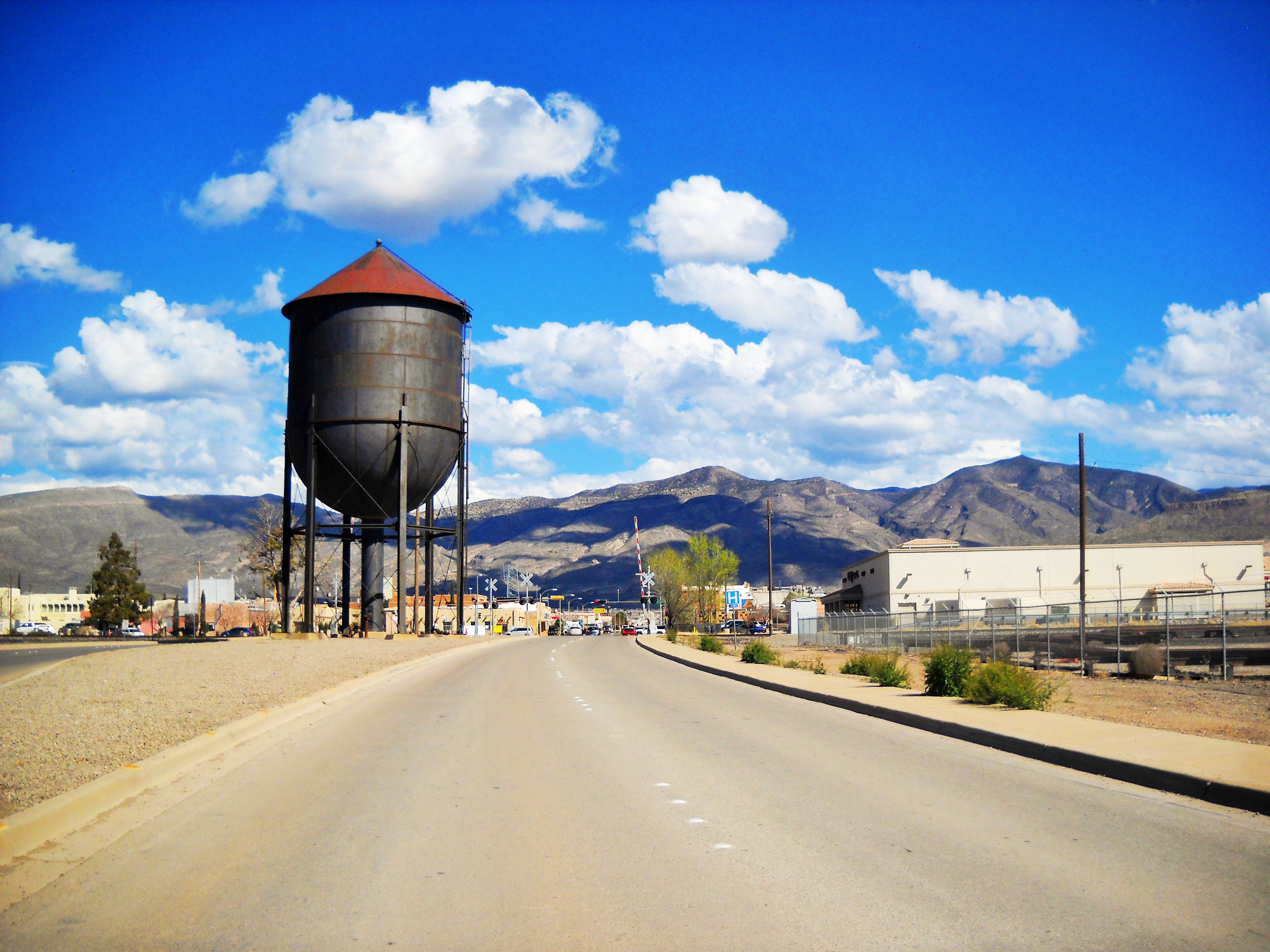
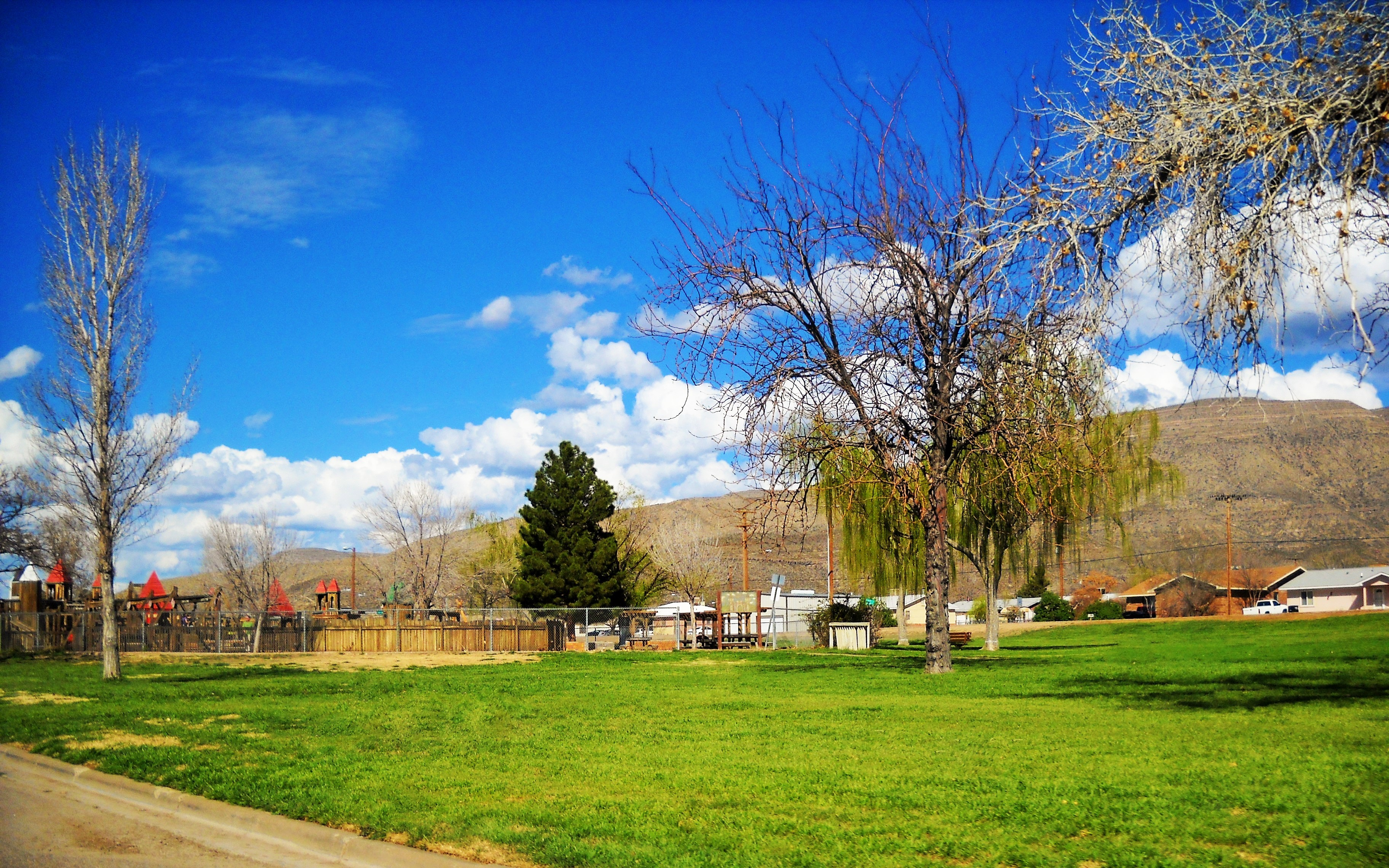
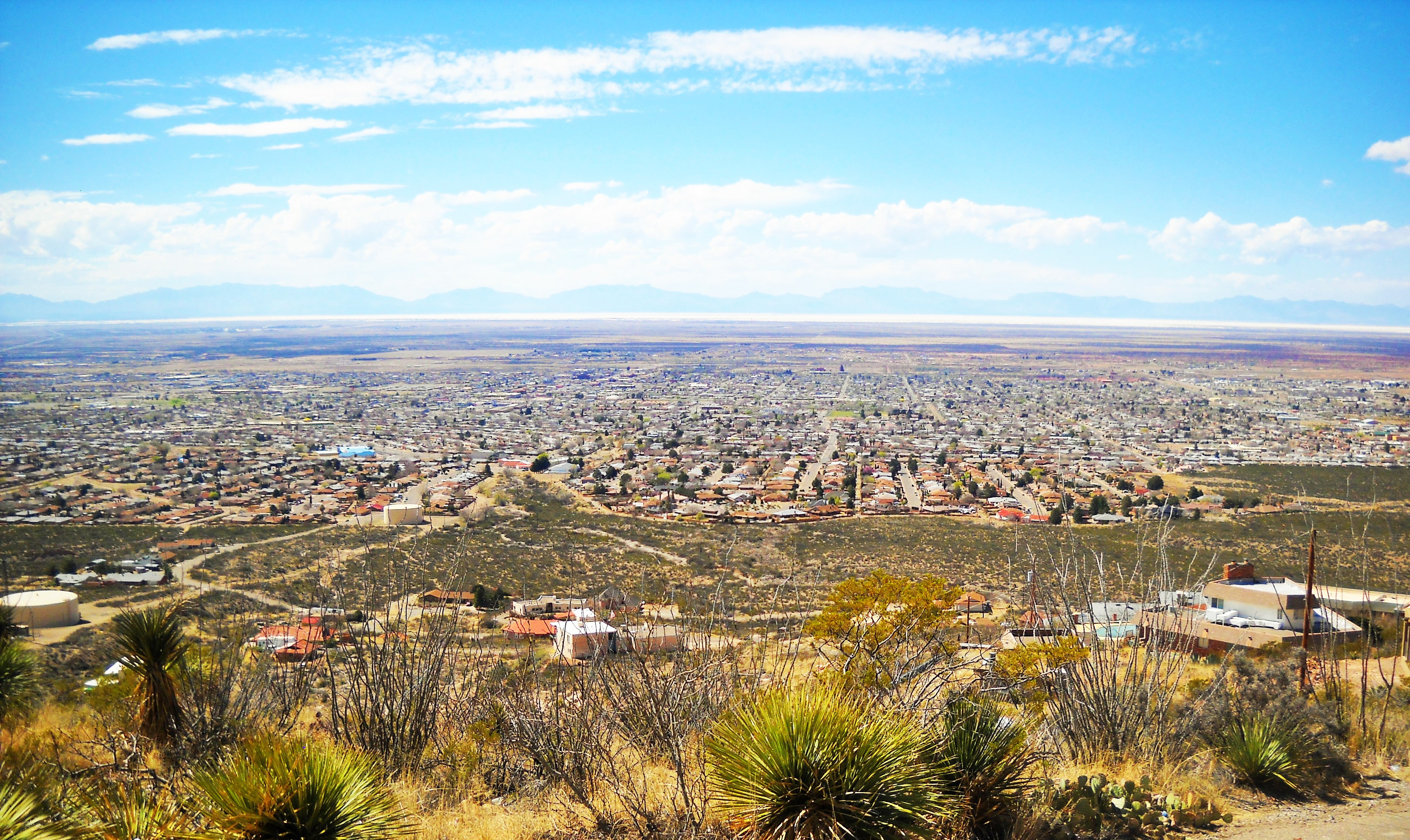
- Downtown Alamogordo Jim Griggs Sports Complex Shops on New York Avenue Water Tower Kids' Kingdom Park View of Alamogordo from Thunder Road

- Location in New Mexico

- Location in New Mexico Alamogordo, New Mexico (the United States) Alamogordo, New Mexico (North America)
- Coordinates: 32°51′22″N 105°58′28″W
- Country: United States
- State: New Mexico
- County: Otero
- Founded: 1898
- Incorporated: 1912
- Named for: álamo gordo, Spanish for "fat cottonwood"

Government
  - Type: Commission–manager
  - Mayor: Susan Payne
  - Mayor Pro Tem: Al Hernandez
  - City Manager: Maggie Paluch

Area
  - Total: 21.58 sq mi (55.90 km^{2})
  - Land: 21.57 sq mi (55.87 km^{2})
  - Water: 0.012 sq mi (0.03 km^{2})
- Elevation: 4,330 ft (1,320 m)

Population (2020)
  - Total: 30,898
  - Density: 1,432.3/sq mi (553.02/km^{2})
- Time zone: UTC−7 (Mountain Standard Time Zone)
  - Summer (DST): UTC−6 (Mountain Daylight Time)
- ZIP codes: 88310, 88311 (PO Box)
- Area code: 575
- FIPS code: 35-01780
- GNIS feature ID: 2409672
- Website: ci.alamogordo.nm.us

Alamogordo (/ˌæləməˈɡɔːrdoʊ/) is a city in and the county seat of Otero County, New Mexico, United States. A city in the Tularosa Basin of the Chihuahuan Desert, it is bordered on the east by the Sacramento Mountains and to the west by Holloman Air Force Base. The population was 31,384 as of the 2020 census. Alamogordo is widely known for its connection with the 1945 Trinity test, which was the first-ever explosion of an atomic bomb.

Humans have lived in the Alamogordo area for at least 11,000 years. The present settlement, established in 1898 to support the construction of the El Paso and Northeastern Railroad, is an early example of a planned community. The city was incorporated in 1912. Tourism became an important economic factor with the creation of White Sands National Park in 1933, which is still one of the biggest attractions of the city today. During the 1950s and 1960s, Alamogordo was an unofficial center for research on pilot safety and the development of the United States' space program.

Alamogordo is a charter city with a council-manager form of government. City government provides a large number of recreational and leisure facilities for its citizens, including a large park in the center of the city, many smaller parks scattered through the city, a golf course, Alameda Park Zoo, a network of walking paths, Alamogordo Public Library, and a senior citizens' center. Gerald Champion Regional Medical Center is a nonprofit shared military/civilian facility that is also the hospital for Holloman Air Force Base.

== History ==
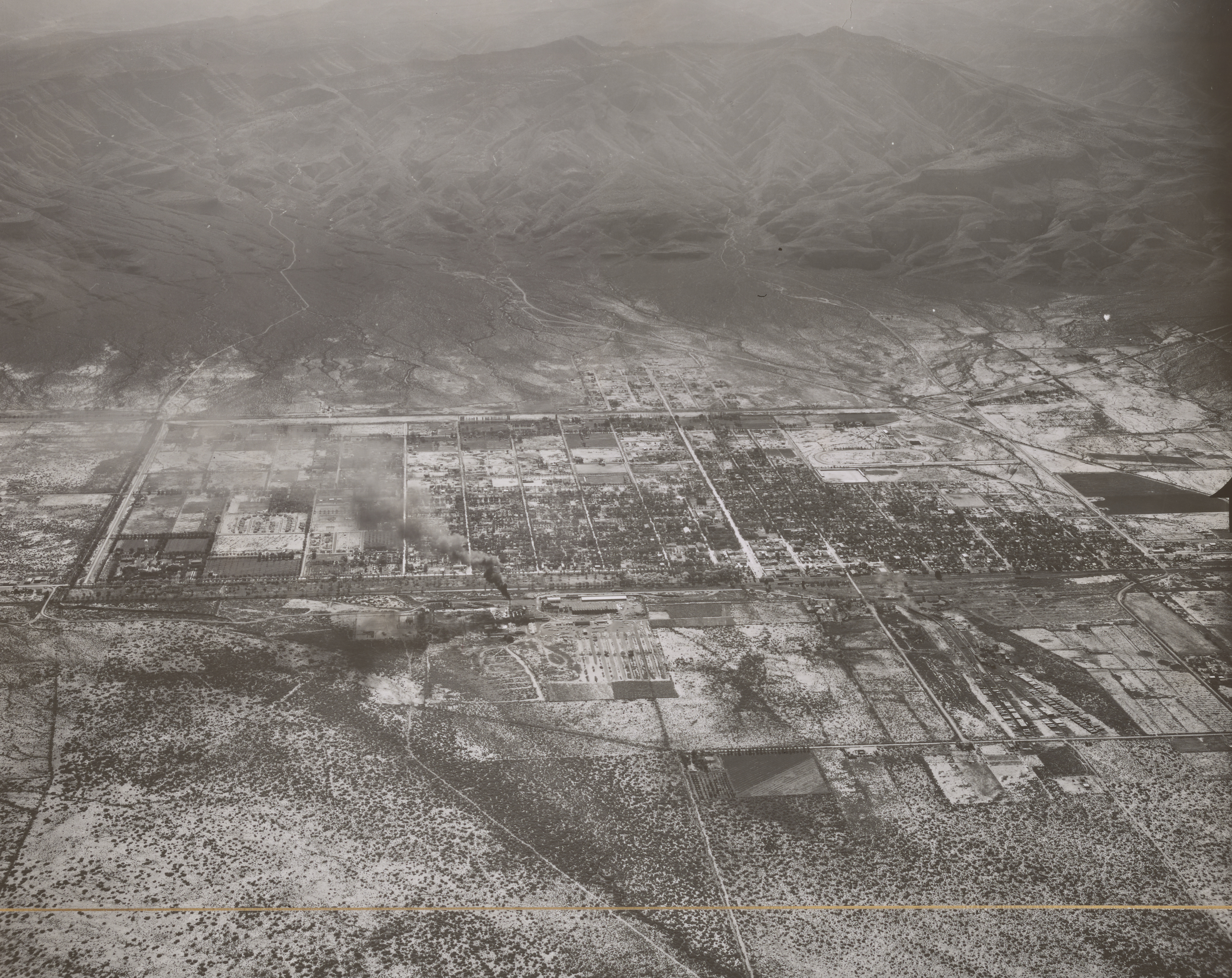
Aerial image of Alamogordo in 1951

Tularosa Basin has been inhabited for at least 11,000 years. There are signs of previous inhabitants in the area such as the Clovis culture, the Folsom culture, the peoples of the Archaic period, and the Formative stage. The Mescalero Apache were already living in the Tularosa Basin when the Spanish came in 1534, and Mescalero oral history says they have always lived there. In 1719, the Spanish built a chapel at La Luz (about 5 miles (8.0 km) from the future site of Alamogordo), although La Luz was not settled until about 1860.

The city of Alamogordo was founded in June 1898, when the El Paso and Northeastern Railroad, headed by Charles Bishop Eddy, extended the railway to the town. Eddy influenced the design of the community, which included large, wide thoroughfares and tree-lined irrigation canals. Charles Eddy's brother, John Arthur Eddy, named the new city. He created a neologism adapted from the Spanish words for "large/fat cottonwood" after a grove of stout cottonwoods he remembered from the Pecos River area. However, the word "Alamogordo" was not used in the Spanish language. When Alamogordo was laid out in 1898, the east–west streets were given numerical designations, while north–south streets were named after states. The present-day White Sands Boulevard was then called Pennsylvania Avenue.

With the creation of White Sands National Monument in 1934, tourism began.

The Works Progress Administration, a government program created in 1935 in response to the Great Depression, was responsible for the construction of several government buildings in Alamogordo. These include the Otero County Administration Building at 1101 New York Avenue, a Pueblo style building originally constructed as the main U.S. Post Office in 1938. The building is listed in the National Register of Historic Places. The main entrance portico features frescoes by Peter Hurd, which were completed in 1942.

In July 1941, the Alamogordo Bombing and Gunnery Range was established.

The Post Office moved out in 1961, and the building was used by a succession of federal agencies and was known as the Federal Building. The last federal agency to occupy it was the United States Forest Service who used it as the headquarters of the Lincoln National Forest until October 2008, when that agency moved to a newly constructed building. In February 2009, ownership of the building was transferred to Otero County government and many government offices were moved from the Courthouse to its new Administration Building.

In 1983, Atari, Inc. buried more than 700,000 unsold Atari 2600 video game cartridges in Alamogordo's landfill. Most notably, Atari discarded many copies of the unpopular E.T. the Extra-Terrestrial. This event was often believed to be an urban legend, until it was confirmed by Atari and excavations at the landfill.

Alamogordo briefly made international news in late 2001 when Christ Community Church held a public book burning of books in the Harry Potter series, and several other series, on December 30.

== Geography ==
As of 2010, Alamogordo had a total area of 19.3 square miles (50.0 km^{2}), all land. The city is located on the western flank of the Sacramento Mountains and on the eastern edge of the Tularosa Basin. It lies within the Rio Grande rift and in the northernmost part of the Chihuahuan Desert. Tectonic activity is low in the Tularosa Basin. Plants native to the area are typical of the southern New Mexico foothills and include creosote bush, mesquite, saltbush, cottonwood, desert willow, and many species of cactus and yucca.

The Tularosa Basin is an endorheic, or closed, basin; that is, no water flows out of it. Because of this and because of the geology of the region, water in the basin is hard: it has very high total dissolved solids concentrations, in excess of 3,000 mg/L. The Brackish Groundwater National Desalination Research Facility, a Bureau of Reclamation laboratory doing research and development on desalination of brackish water, is located in Alamogordo. The gypsum crystals of White Sands National Park are formed in Lake Lucero. Water drains from the mountains carrying dissolved gypsum and collects in Lake Lucero. After the water dries, the winds pick up the gypsum crystals and distribute them over the basin.

=== Climate ===
Alamogordo has a semi-arid climate (Köppen BSk), bordering a desert climate (BWk), with hot summers and mild winters. Rainfall is low and usually confined to the monsoon from July to September, when half a typical year's rainfall of 10.63 in (270.0 mm) will occur – although December 1991 did see 5.45 in (138.4 mm). The wettest calendar year has been 1941 with 21.87 in (555.5 mm) and the driest 1952 with 4.85 in (123.2 mm), while the wettest month on record has been September 1941 when 6.94 in (176.3 mm) fell. September 1941 also saw the largest daily rainfall at Alamogordo with 2.60 in (66.0 mm) falling on the 22nd of that month.

Temperatures outside of monsoonal storms are very hot during the summer: 89.1 days exceed 90 °F (32.2 °C) and temperatures as high as 110 °F (43.3 °C) occurred on June 22, 1981, and July 8, 1951. During the winter, days are very mild and sunny, but nights are cold, with 32 °F (0 °C) reached on 55.1 mornings during an average winter, although only ten mornings have ever fallen to or below 0 °F (−17.8 °C), with the coldest temperature recorded at Alamogordo being −13 °F (−25.0 °C) during a major cold wave on February 3, 2011. Snow is very rare, with a mean of no more than 4.1 in (10 cm) and a median very close to zero. The most snowfall in one month was 10.0 in (25 cm) in December 1960.

Climate data for Alamogordo, New Mexico, elevation 4,330 feet (1,320 m) (1991–2020 normals, extremes 1913–present)
| Month | Jan | Feb | Mar | Apr | May | Jun | Jul | Aug | Sep | Oct | Nov | Dec | Year |
|---|---|---|---|---|---|---|---|---|---|---|---|---|---|
| Record high °F (°C) | 76 (24) | 82 (28) | 90 (32) | 97 (36) | 104 (40) | 110 (43) | 110 (43) | 108 (42) | 102 (39) | 96 (36) | 88 (31) | 78 (26) | 110 (43) |
| Mean maximum °F (°C) | 68.1 (20.1) | 73.3 (22.9) | 81.3 (27.4) | 87.2 (30.7) | 96.2 (35.7) | 103.0 (39.4) | 102.2 (39.0) | 97.6 (36.4) | 94.6 (34.8) | 87.7 (30.9) | 76.9 (24.9) | 68.7 (20.4) | 104.3 (40.2) |
| Mean daily maximum °F (°C) | 54.8 (12.7) | 60.1 (15.6) | 67.6 (19.8) | 75.8 (24.3) | 84.8 (29.3) | 94.0 (34.4) | 92.6 (33.7) | 91.1 (32.8) | 85.5 (29.7) | 75.4 (24.1) | 63.6 (17.6) | 54.1 (12.3) | 75.0 (23.9) |
| Daily mean °F (°C) | 44.0 (6.7) | 48.7 (9.3) | 55.2 (12.9) | 63.1 (17.3) | 71.7 (22.1) | 81.1 (27.3) | 81.2 (27.3) | 79.4 (26.3) | 74.1 (23.4) | 63.3 (17.4) | 52.1 (11.2) | 43.3 (6.3) | 63.1 (17.3) |
| Mean daily minimum °F (°C) | 33.2 (0.7) | 37.3 (2.9) | 42.9 (6.1) | 50.5 (10.3) | 58.6 (14.8) | 68.1 (20.1) | 69.8 (21.0) | 67.8 (19.9) | 62.6 (17.0) | 51.3 (10.7) | 40.6 (4.8) | 32.6 (0.3) | 51.3 (10.7) |
| Mean minimum °F (°C) | 19.3 (−7.1) | 21.7 (−5.7) | 26.4 (−3.1) | 33.9 (1.1) | 42.7 (5.9) | 55.1 (12.8) | 61.2 (16.2) | 59.5 (15.3) | 50.4 (10.2) | 34.3 (1.3) | 23.2 (−4.9) | 17.2 (−8.2) | 14.9 (−9.5) |
| Record low °F (°C) | −4 (−20) | −13 (−25) | 10 (−12) | 20 (−7) | 32 (0) | 41 (5) | 49 (9) | 48 (9) | 33 (1) | 19 (−7) | 0 (−18) | −1 (−18) | −13 (−25) |
| Average precipitation inches (mm) | 0.68 (17) | 0.59 (15) | 0.33 (8.4) | 0.27 (6.9) | 0.46 (12) | 0.56 (14) | 1.62 (41) | 1.96 (50) | 1.49 (38) | 1.01 (26) | 0.56 (14) | 1.10 (28) | 10.63 (270) |
| Average snowfall inches (cm) | 1.0 (2.5) | 0.1 (0.25) | 0.2 (0.51) | 0.0 (0.0) | 0.0 (0.0) | 0.0 (0.0) | 0.0 (0.0) | 0.0 (0.0) | 0.0 (0.0) | 0.1 (0.25) | 0.1 (0.25) | 0.9 (2.3) | 2.4 (6.1) |
| Average precipitation days (≥ 0.01 inch) | 3.8 | 4.3 | 3.2 | 2.3 | 3.2 | 3.7 | 9.3 | 9.2 | 5.4 | 5.1 | 2.8 | 3.4 | 55.7 |
| Average snowy days (≥ 0.1 in) | 0.4 | 0.1 | 0.1 | 0.0 | 0.0 | 0.0 | 0.0 | 0.0 | 0.0 | 0.1 | 0.1 | 0.5 | 1.3 |
Source: NOAA

== Demographics ==
Historical population
| Census | Pop. | Note | %± |
|---|---|---|---|
| 1920 | 2,363 | | — |
| 1930 | 3,096 | | 31.0% |
| 1940 | 3,950 | | 27.6% |
| 1950 | 6,783 | | 71.7% |
| 1960 | 21,723 | | 220.3% |
| 1970 | 23,035 | | 6.0% |
| 1980 | 24,024 | | 4.3% |
| 1990 | 27,596 | | 14.9% |
| 2000 | 35,582 | | 28.9% |
| 2010 | 30,403 | | −14.6% |
| 2020 | 30,898 | | 1.6% |
U.S. Decennial Census

=== 2020 census ===
As of the 2020 census, Alamogordo had a population of 30,898. The median age was 37.9 years. 21.9% of residents were under the age of 18 and 19.4% of residents were 65 years of age or older. For every 100 females there were 99.3 males, and for every 100 females age 18 and over there were 98.5 males age 18 and over.

98.1% of residents lived in urban areas, while 1.9% lived in rural areas.

There were 13,377 households in Alamogordo, of which 26.4% had children under the age of 18 living in them. Of all households, 39.8% were married-couple households, 24.1% were households with a male householder and no spouse or partner present, and 28.7% were households with a female householder and no spouse or partner present. About 34.3% of all households were made up of individuals and 13.5% had someone living alone who was 65 years of age or older.

There were 15,118 housing units, of which 11.5% were vacant. The homeowner vacancy rate was 3.5% and the rental vacancy rate was 9.3%.

Racial composition as of the 2020 census
| Race | Number | Percent |
|---|---|---|
| White | 19,437 | 62.9% |
| Black or African American | 1,918 | 6.2% |
| American Indian and Alaska Native | 520 | 1.7% |
| Asian | 748 | 2.4% |
| Native Hawaiian and Other Pacific Islander | 127 | 0.4% |
| Some other race | 2,905 | 9.4% |
| Two or more races | 5,243 | 17.0% |
| Hispanic or Latino (of any race) | 10,250 | 33.2% |

=== 2000 census ===
As of the 2000 census, there were 13,704 households, and 9,728 families residing in the city. There were 15,920 housing units. The racial makeup of the city was 70.4% White; 5.6% African American, 1.1% Native American, 1.5% Asian, 0.2% Pacific Islander, 12.1% from some other race, and 4.2% from two or more races. Hispanic or Latino of any race were 32.0% of the population.

There were 13,704 households, out of which 36.3% had children under the age of 18 living with them, 55.6% were married couples living together, 11.7% had a female householder with no husband present, and 29.0% were non-families. 25.2% of all households were made up of individuals, and 8.8% had someone living alone who was 65 years of age or older. The average household size was 2.57 and the average family size was 3.07.

In the city the population was spread out, with 28.7% under the age of 18, 9.2% from 18 to 24, 29.7% from 25 to 44, 19.9% from 45 to 64, and 12.7% who were 65 years of age or older. The median age was 34 years. For every 100 females, there were 97.6 males. For every 100 females age 18 and over, there were 94.1 males.

In 1999, the median income for a household in the city was $30,928, and the median income for a family was $35,673. Males had a median income of $28,163 versus $18,860 for females. The per capita income for the city was $14,662. About 13.2% of families and 16.5% of the population were below the poverty line, including 23.9% of those under age 18 and 11.8% of those age 65 or over.

=== German community, 1992–2019 ===
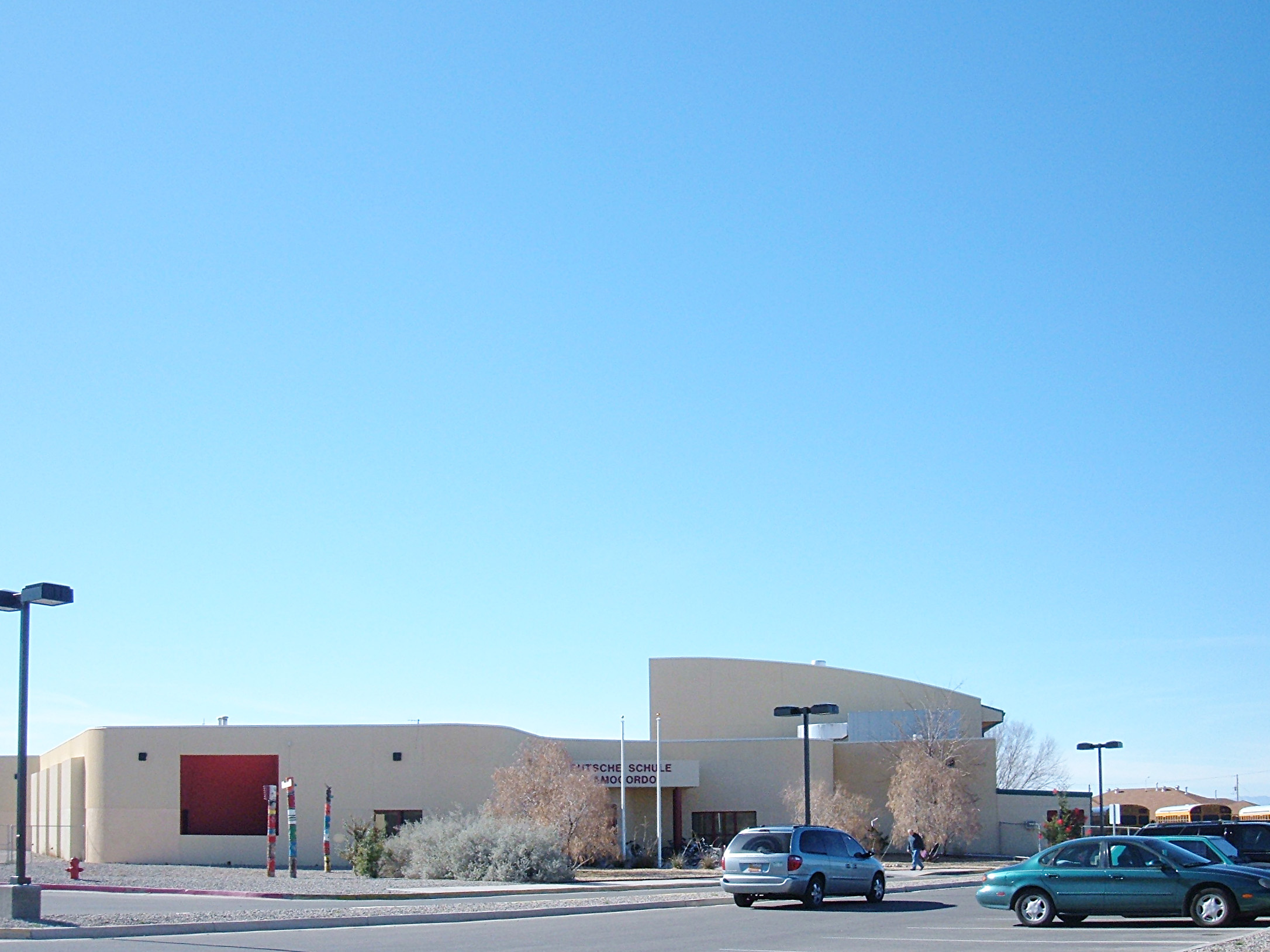
Deutsche Schule Alamogordo, a school for children of German Air Force service members and employees at the German Air Force Flying Training Center at Holloman Air Force Base

Previously Alamogordo had a German community due to the presence of the German Air Force at Holloman Air Force Base; in 1992 that air force made Holloman its main pilot training center in the United States. Holloman was chosen due to its weather conditions. There was a subdivision called "Little Germany" with houses that had German-style electrical outlets. The Deutsche Schule Alamogordo educated German children, as did the local schools. Additionally area supermarkets had German cuisine.

By 1999, there were about 1,110 German dependents and 900 German military personnel in Alamogordo. By 2003 there were about 2,000 Germans in Alamogordo. That year there were tensions between Americans and Germans since Germany chose not to join the U.S. in the Iraq War.

In 2019, the German military withdrew from the base.

Until the German Air Force left, Oktoberfest was celebrated annually in late September, hosted by the German Air Force at Holloman Air Force Base. The public was invited, and shuttle buses ran between Alamogordo and the base.

== Economy ==
Alamogordo is the economic center of Otero County, with nearly half the Otero County population living within the city limits. Alamogordo today has very little manufacturing and has a primarily service and retail economy, driven by tourism, a large nearby military installation and a concentration of military retirees. In 2006 the per capita income in Otero County was $22,377 versus per capita income in New Mexico of $29,346.

=== Economic history ===
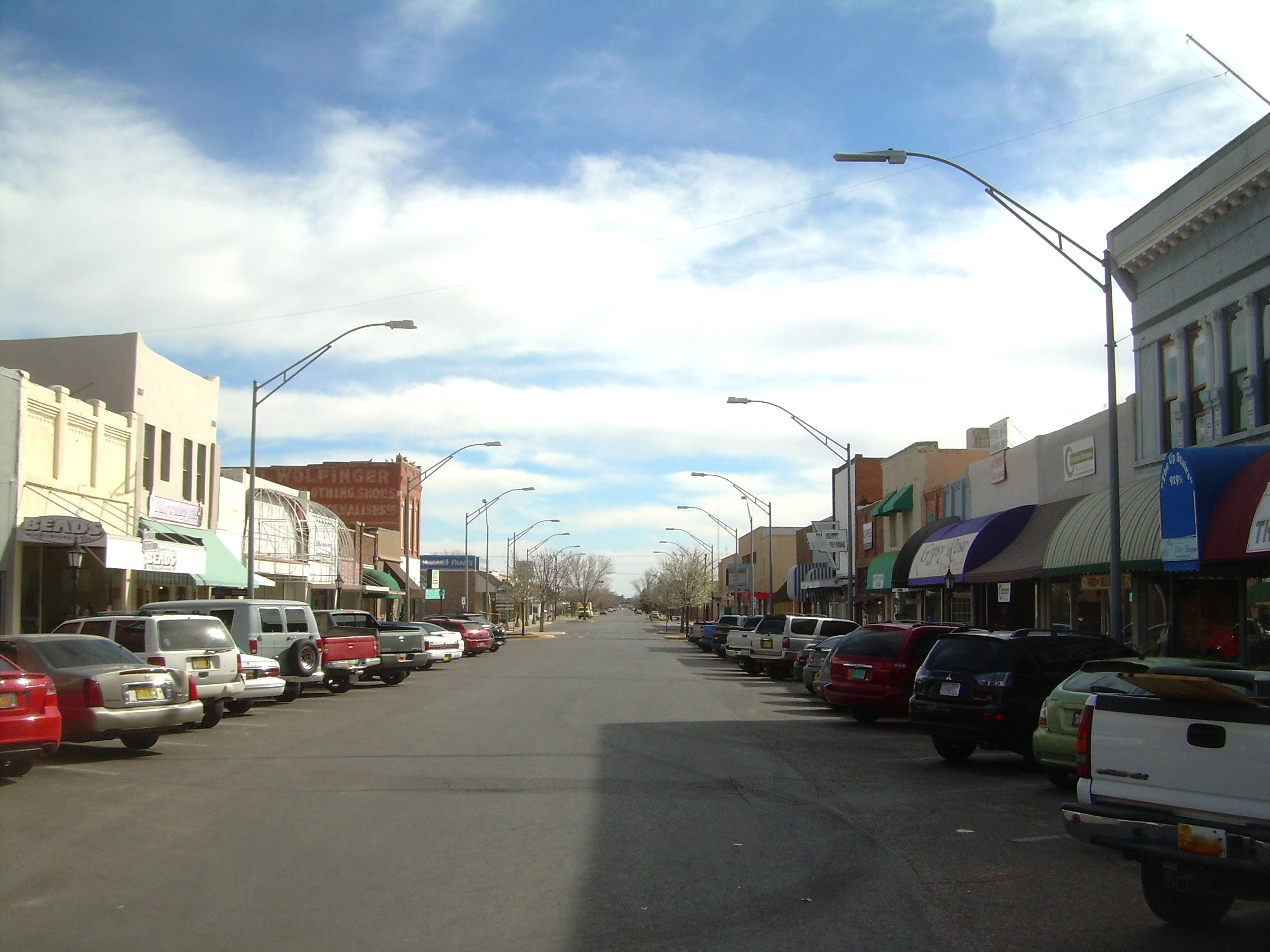
Retail shops on New York Avenue

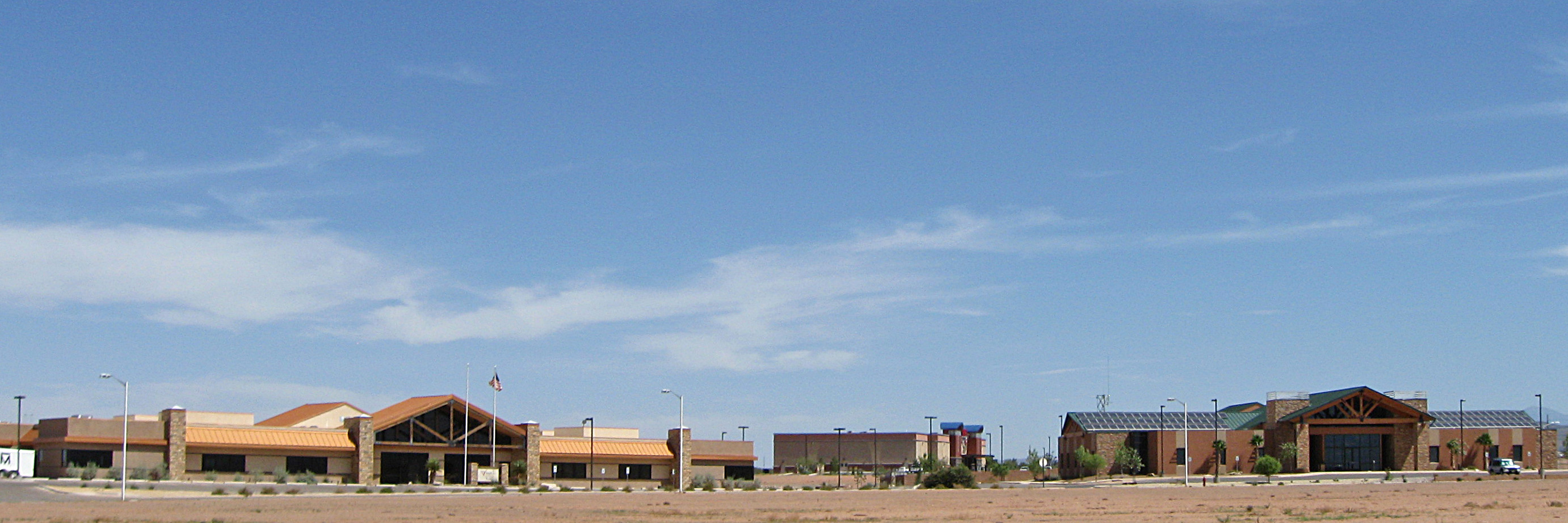
Buildings in Alamogordo: PreCheck headquarters, Aviator 10 Theater, and the US Department of Agriculture / Forest Service building.

Alamogordo was founded as a company town to support the building of the El Paso and Northeastern Railroad, a portion of the transcontinental railway that was being constructed in the late 19th century. Initially its main industry was timbering for railroad ties. The railroad founders were also eager to found a major town that would persist after the railroad was completed; they formed the Alamogordo Improvement Company to develop the area, making Alamogordo an early example of a planned community. The Alamogordo Improvement Company owned all the land, platted the streets, built the first houses and commercial buildings, donated land for a college, and placed a restrictive covenant on each deed prohibiting the manufacture, distribution, or sale of intoxicating liquor.

Tourism became an important part of the local economy from the creation of White Sands National Monument in 1934. Construction began on the Alamogordo Army Airfield (the present-day Holloman Air Force Base) in 1942, and the Federal government has been a strong presence in Alamogordo ever since. Education has also been an important part of the local economy. In addition to the local school system, Alamogordo is home to the New Mexico School for the Blind and Visually Impaired, founded in 1903, and a branch of New Mexico State University founded in 1958. The largest non-government employer in the city is the Gerald Champion Regional Medical Center with 650 employees in 2008.

=== Military impact ===
Holloman Air Force Base, located approximately 3 miles (4.8 km) west of the city limits, is the largest employer of Alamogordo residents, and has a major effect on the local economy. According to some estimates, Holloman accounts for half of the Alamogordo economy. According to the 49th Fighter Wing Public Affairs office, as of January 2008 Holloman directly employs 6,111 personnel with a gross payroll of $266 million. It indirectly creates another 2,047 jobs with a payroll of $77 million. The estimated amount spent in the community, including payroll, construction projects, supplies, services, health care, and education, is $482 million.

An estimated 6,700 military retirees live in the area. Counting both USAF and German Air Force personnel there are 1,383 active military and 1,641 military dependents living on base and 2,765 active military and 2,942 military dependents living off base. After 27 years of training at Holloman, the German Air Force left in 2019. They relocated their pilot training to Sheppard Air Force Base in Texas.

Future Combat Systems is a wide-ranging modernization project of the US Army. Much of the work will be done at Fort Bliss, with some at White Sands Missile Range and some at Holloman Air Force Base. Alamogordo is expected to get some economic benefit due to its proximity to these three bases.

=== Economic development ===
Otero County Economic Development Council is a nonprofit organization founded in 1984. Its focus has generally been on job creation and recruiting and expanding businesses in Otero County, including helping them satisfy business regulations in New Mexico and lining up funding. Its role expanded in 2000, when Alamogordo passed an Economic Development Gross Receipts Tax. OCEDC continues to work to attract businesses, but now it also helps develop the incentive packages that will be paid by the new tax, and a portion of the tax receipts go to fund OCEDC's operating expenses. Formal economic development plans have been adopted by Alamogordo and by Otero County.

OCEDC has recruited several new employers by using financial incentives. A 1-800-Flowers call center opened in November 2001 and received $1.25 million in city rent abatements, a 50% reduction in property taxes from Otero County, and $940,000 in plant training funds from the State of New Mexico. A Sunbaked Biscuits cookie factory opened in 2006 and received $800,000 in job-training incentives from the state. When the company went out of business in 2007, Marietta Baking took over the cookie factory and received interest-free loans, job-training incentives, and partial forgiveness of indebtedness for job creation. A branch office of PreCheck Inc., a company performing background checks of health-care workers, opened in 2006. PreCheck received $2.4 million in high-wage job creation tax credits, $1.5 million in job-training subsidies, $1.5 million in capital outlay money for roads and infrastructure, a $625,000 allocation from City of Alamogordo for upgrading sewer lines in the area, and 20.8 acres of land from Heritage Group, a developer.

The Otero County Film Office, an office of Otero County Economic Development Council, promotes film-making in Otero County by publicizing potential locations in the county and New Mexico's film financial incentive programs and by recruiting extras for film productions. It sponsors the Desert Light Film Competition for middle and high school students to encourage learning about the film industry. The 2007 film Transformers spent $5.5 million in New Mexico and $1 million in Alamogordo.

== Arts and culture ==
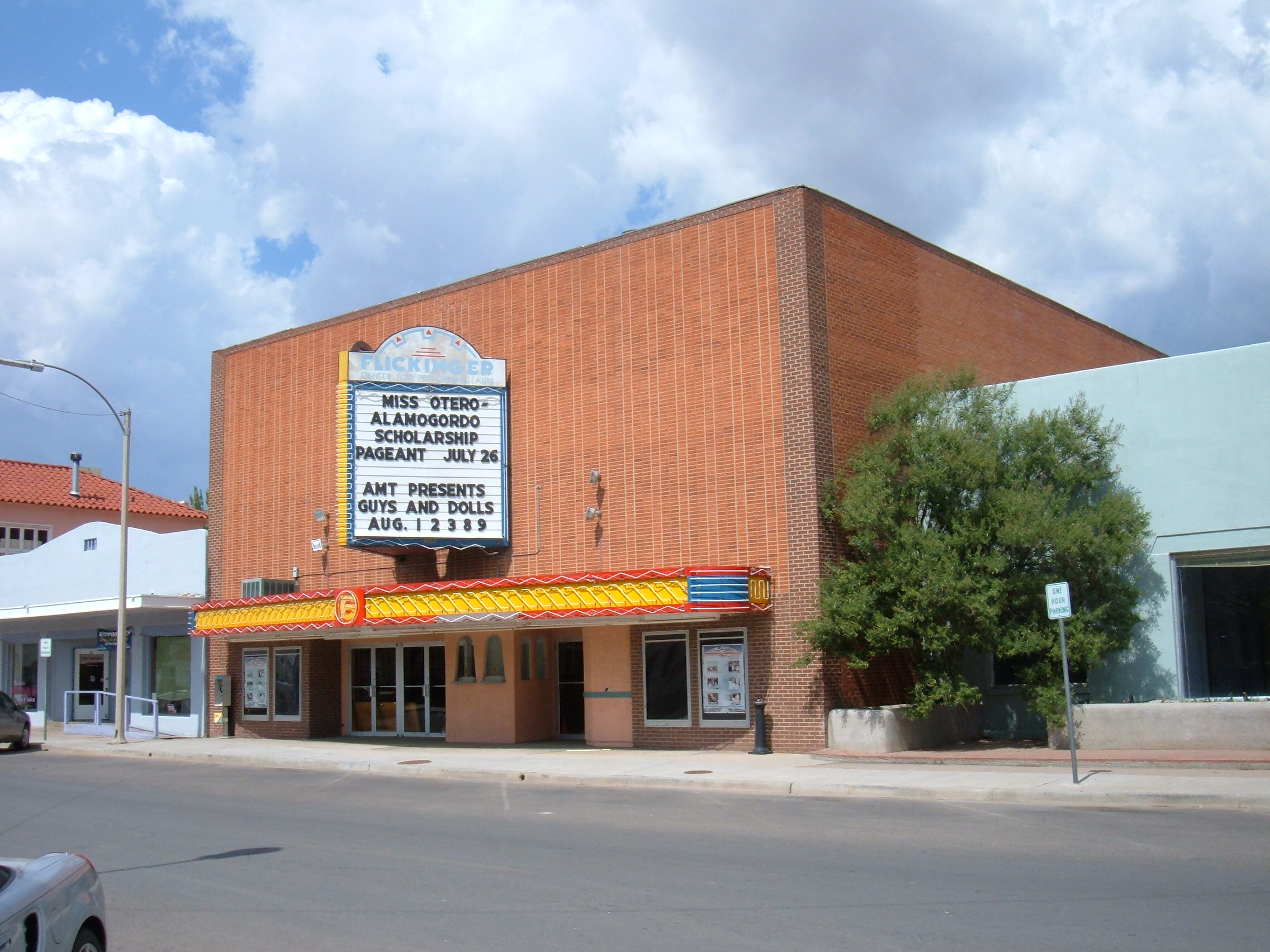
Flickinger Center for Performing Arts is a venue for concerts and live theater.

There are two amateur theatrical groups in Alamogordo. Alamogordo Music Theatre produces two musical productions annually at the Flickinger Center for Performing Arts. The NMSU-A Theatre on the Hill produces an annual spring performance for young audiences at the Rohovec Fine Arts Center on the New Mexico State University at Alamogordo campus, and an annual Fall performance for general audiences.

=== Annual cultural events ===
The Earth Day Fair is held annually at Alameda Park Zoo. It features a butterfly release, a science fair, activities for children, and information booths from local health agencies and nonprofits.

Otero County Fair is held annually at the County Fairgrounds. It features a rodeo, animal judging, food and game booths, and carnival rides. Nonprofit and government agencies set up information booths in the exhibit hall.

The Cottonwood Arts and Crafts Festival is put on each Labor Day Weekend in Alameda Park by the Alamogordo Chamber of Commerce. It is primarily a showplace for vendors of handmade items, and also features music, entertainment, and food.

White Sands Balloon Invitational is held annually. Hot air balloons launch from the Riner-Steinhoff Soccerplex and from White Sands National Park and float over the Tularosa Basin.

=== Visitor attractions ===
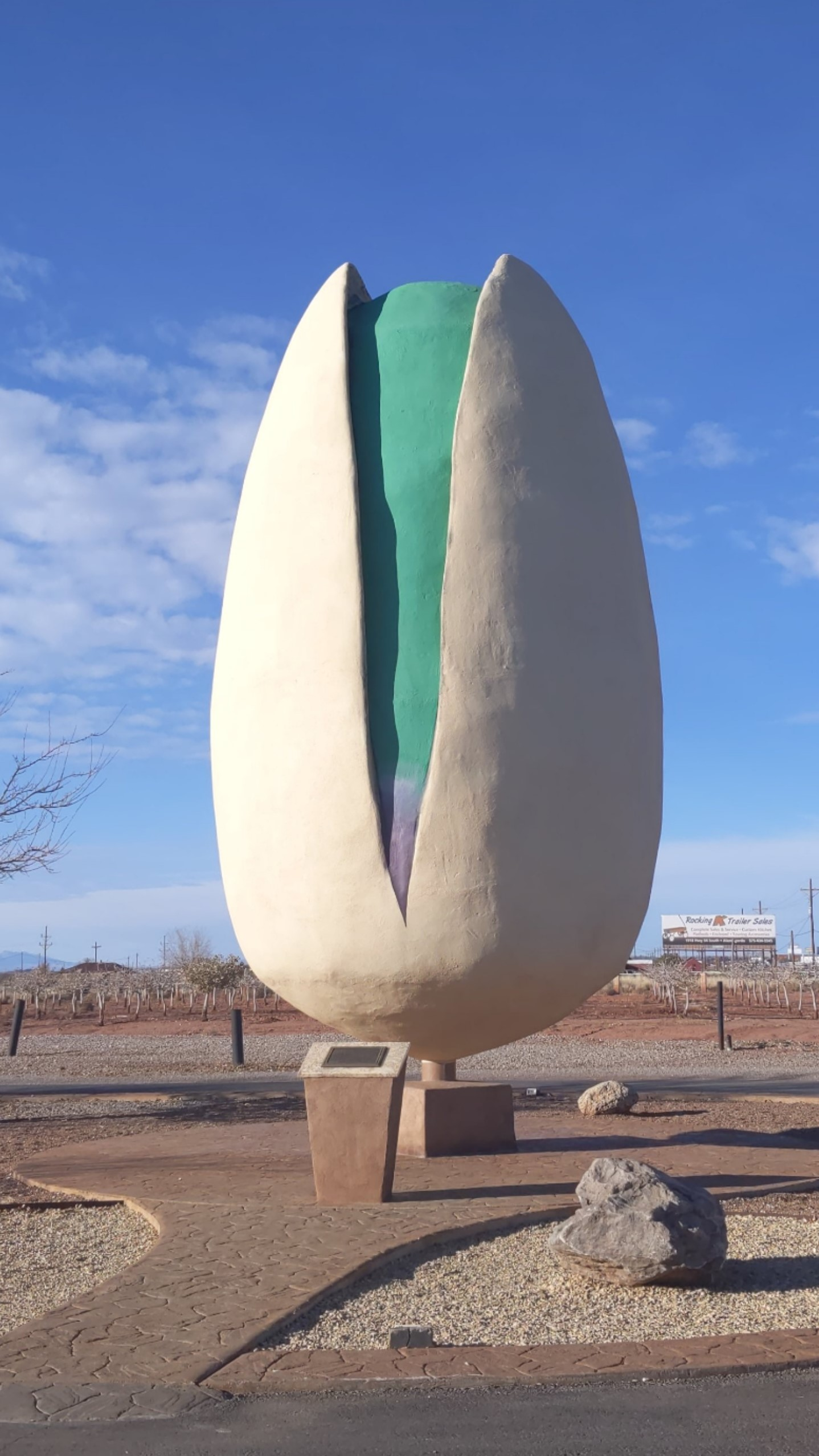
World's largest pistachio in Alamogordo

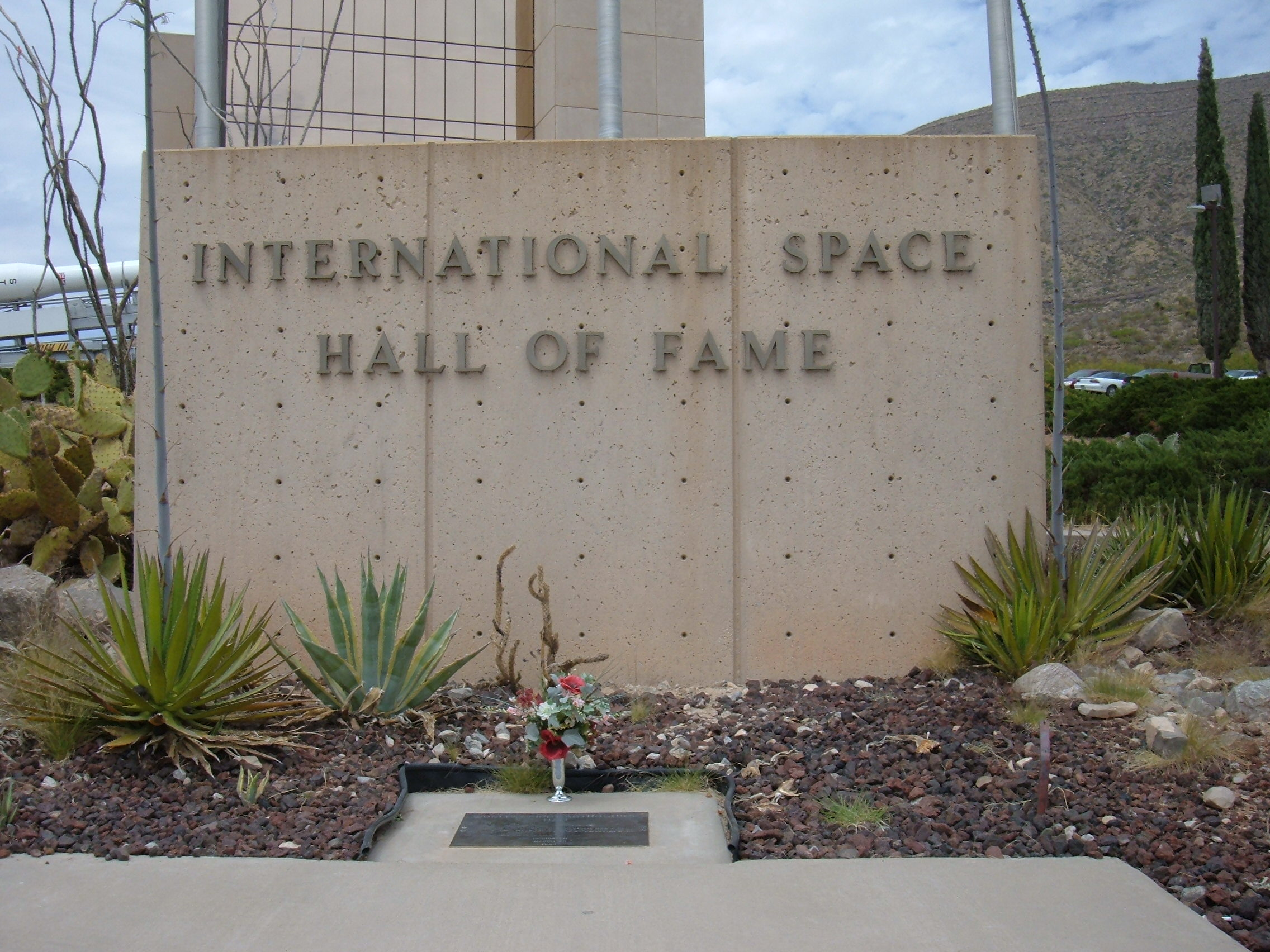
Grave of Ham, a chimpanzee who in 1961 became the first great ape in space, at the New Mexico Museum of Space History

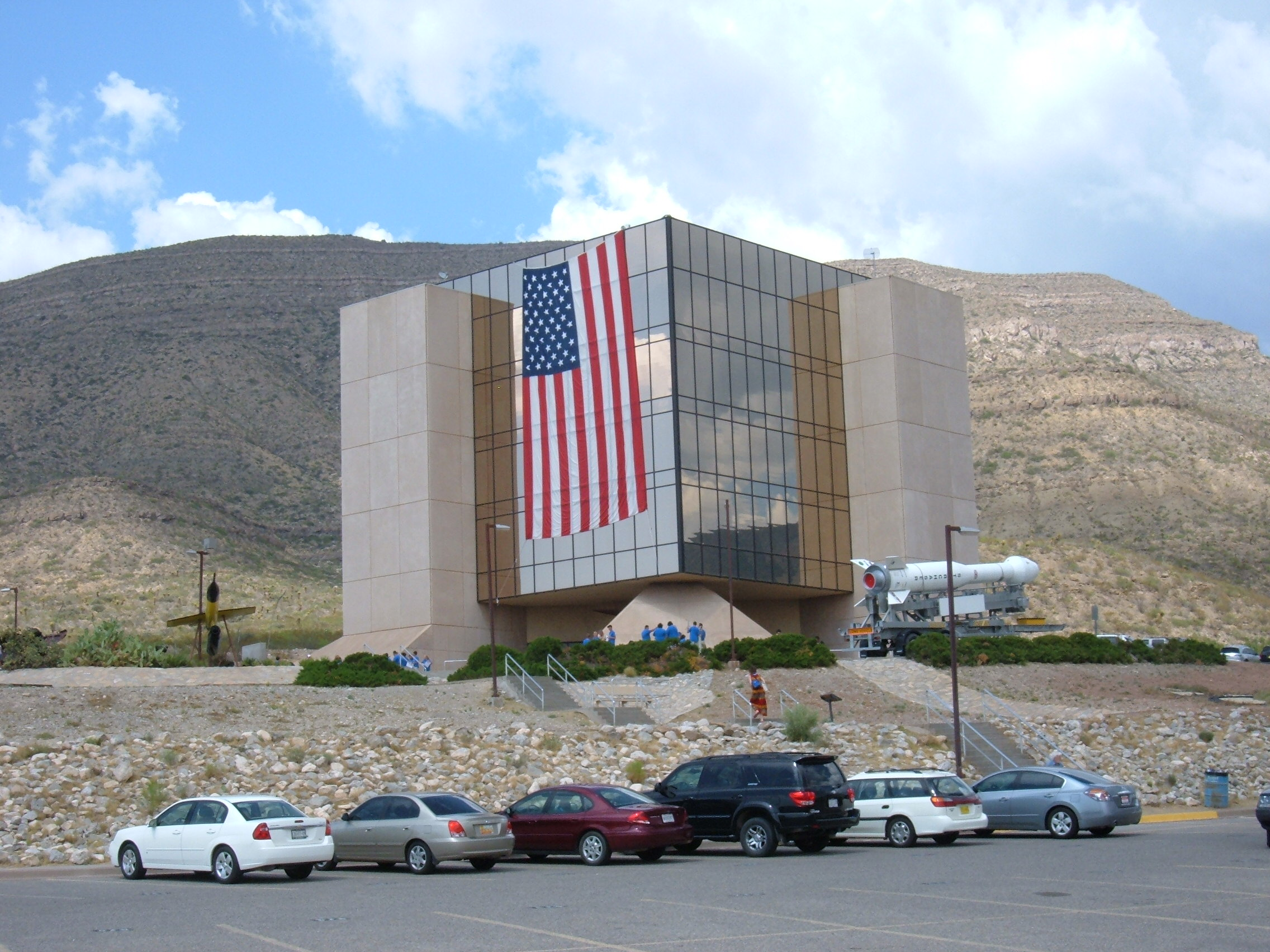
The New Mexico Museum of Space History

New Mexico Museum of Space History is a state museum with the International Space Hall of Fame. Flickinger Center for Performing Arts is a 590-seat theater created in 1988 from a repurposed movie theater. It hosts concerts and live theatrical performances by touring groups, and is the venue for the local amateur group Alamogordo Music Theater.

Alamogordo Museum of History collects artifacts related to the history of Alamogordo and the Tularosa Basin. It is a private museum, operated by the Tularosa Basin Historical Society. Among notable items in the collection is a 47-star US Flag; New Mexico was the 47th state admitted to the Union, and US flags were made with 47 stars only for one month, until Arizona was admitted. The Museum shop has a large collection of local history books. The Historical Society also publishes its own series of monographs on local history, Pioneer.

American Armed Forces Museum is a museum on U.S. Route 82 near Florida Avenue that opened in 2011. It collects and displays all kinds of military memorabilia from all wars and military engagements.

The Shroud Exhibit And Museum, located in White Sands Mall, showcases a full-sized back-lit photographic transparency of the Shroud of Turin, a religious relic believed by some to be the burial cloth of Jesus Christ. They also feature a working VP8 Image Analyzer, the only one in the world where one can walk in and interact with this old analog computer. This town was founded the same year (1898) that Secundo Pia took the first photograph of the Shroud which started the modern investigation into the Shroud. This is highlighted in the museum. In 1977 in Albuquerque, they held the conference that resulted in the 1978 study of the Shroud with more scientists from New Mexico than any other state. The displayed photograph was created from the 1978 photographs made by Barrie M. Schwortz as part of the Shroud of Turin Research Project (STURP). The displays include historical background materials, scientific information, kiosks with a variety of information, videos available for viewing and an exhibit of electronic image analysis of the shroud, among other interesting artifacts.

The Alameda Park Zoo, the oldest zoo in the southwestern U.S., is located in the city. Several Union-Apache battles were fought near Oliver Lee Memorial State Park.

The Toy Train Depot, New Mexico's first railroad museum and home of America's Park Ride Train Museum.

A sculpture called "The World's Largest Pistachio" is at McGinn's PistachioLand along U.S. 54.

== Sports ==
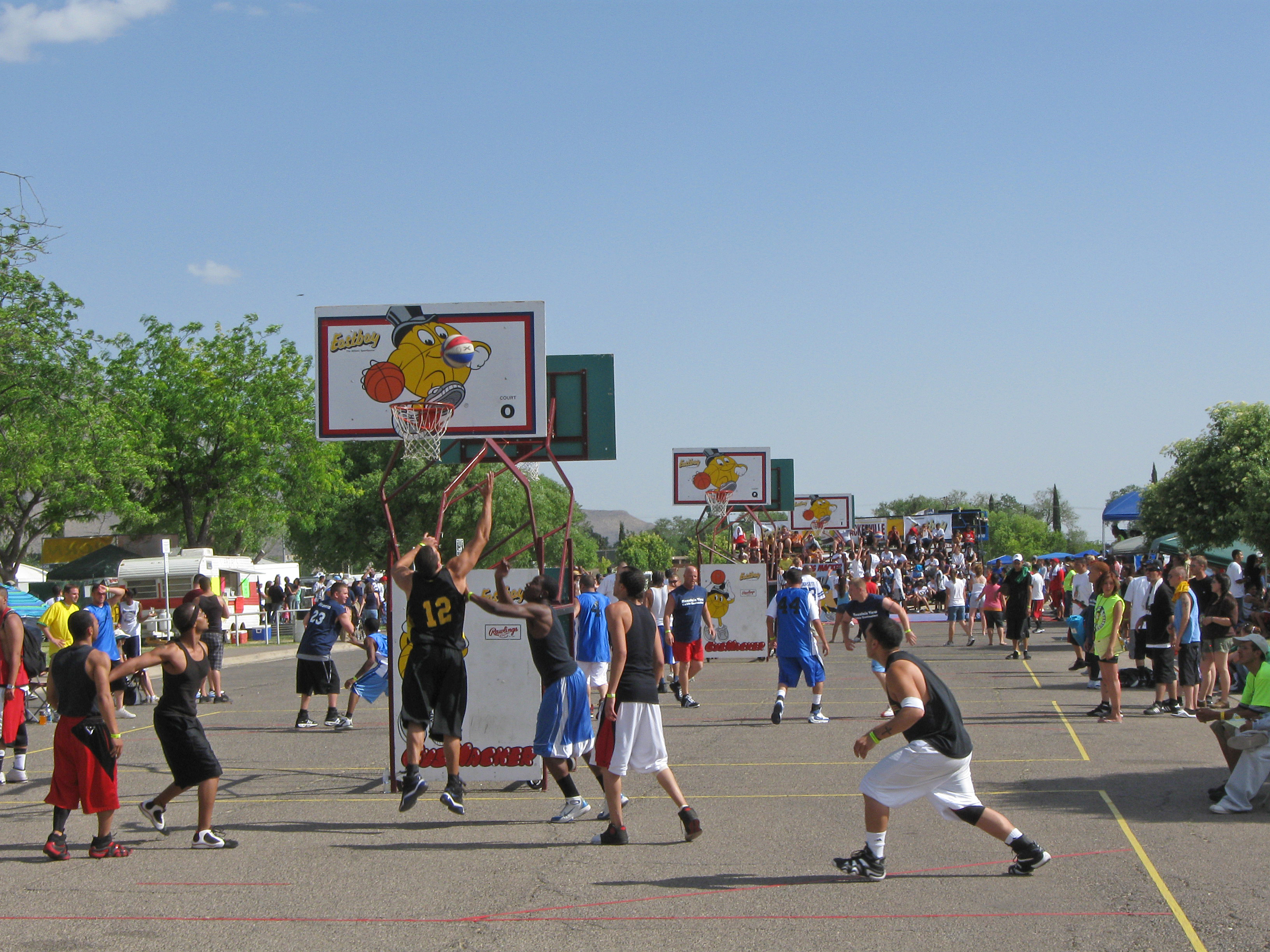
Gus Macker Tournament in Alamogordo

The Lady of the Mountain Run is held in December at the Griggs Sportsplex. The race consists of a half marathon, 10K, 5K, or corporate cup relay, and raises money for the needs-based Lady of the Mountain Scholarship Fund at NMSU-Alamogordo. Fun run/walks are popular in Alamogordo, although most are one-shot affairs put on as part of some larger event. One recurring event is Walk Out West, a 1.5-mile (2.4 km) walk held each October in Alameda Park Zoo. It incorporates a health fair, live music, and events for children. An offshoot of this is Dance Otero, an informal approach to ballroom dancing as a form of physical exercise that meets throughout the year. Both programs are run through Otero PATH, a local nonprofit that encourages preventive measures for good health.

There are a number of annual sports events. The Tommy Padilla Memorial Basketball Tournament is an annual event held in March. It is an adult tournament that raises money for scholarships for Alamogordo High School students. The Gus Macker 3-on-3 Basketball Tournament is a national program that holds a tournament in Alamogordo each year in May. Prior to 2008 it was hosted by the Alamogordo Chamber of Commerce, and since then by the City of Alamogordo. The city receives 72% of the entry fees and 5% of the gross proceeds taken in by vendors. The event is held annually at Washington Park in conjunction with Saturday in the Park and Armed Forces Day. In 2009 more than 233 teams participated in the tournament. Several golf tournaments are held each year at Desert Lakes Golf Course, including the Robert W. Hamilton Charity Golf Classic.

Alamogordo's sole professional sports team is the White Sands Pupfish, a baseball team that played at Jim Griggs Field from 2011 to 2019, in the independent Pecos League, but did not play in a four-team, abridged 2020 season hosted in Houston due to pandemic concerns.

== Parks and recreation ==
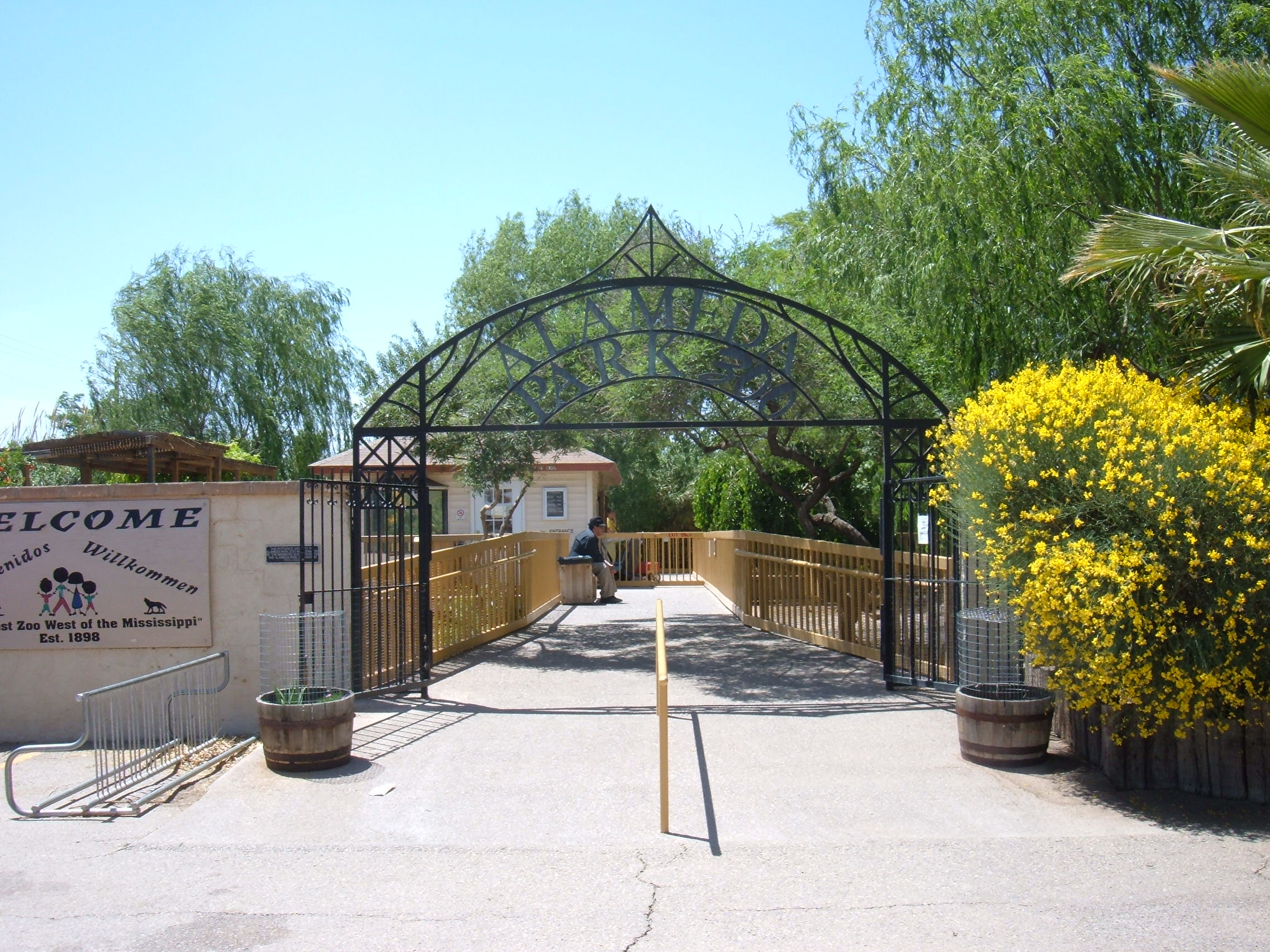
Alameda Park Zoo features southwestern animals.

Alamogordo has numerous small parks scattered through the city, and a few larger ones. Some notable parks include:

- Alameda Park is a city park lying on the west side of White Sands Boulevard between Tenth Street and Indian Wells Road. Most of the park is shaded by cottonwood trees. At the south end of the park is Alameda Park Zoo and at the north end is The Toy Train Depot, a railroad and toy train museum.
- Washington Park is a city park in the center of town, bounded by Washington and Oregon Avenues and running from First Street to Indian Wells Road. City Hall and several other city buildings are located in the park. At the north end of the park is Kids Kingdom, a children's play area with a giant jungle gym.
- There are public athletic fields at the Jim R. Griggs Sports Complex, located at the corner of Florida Avenue and Fairgrounds Road, and the Travis C. Hooser Ballfield Complex (also called Walker Field) located at the corner of U.S. Route 70 and Walker Road.
- The Alamogordo Family Recreation Center, at 1100 Oregon Avenue, is a city-owned facility offering a weight room, swimming pool (open seasonally), and basketball gym. There are outdoor tennis courts north of the building.
- The Alamogordo Senior Center is a city facility for senior citizens that provides a social center and an exercise room and serves congregate meals and Meals on Wheels.

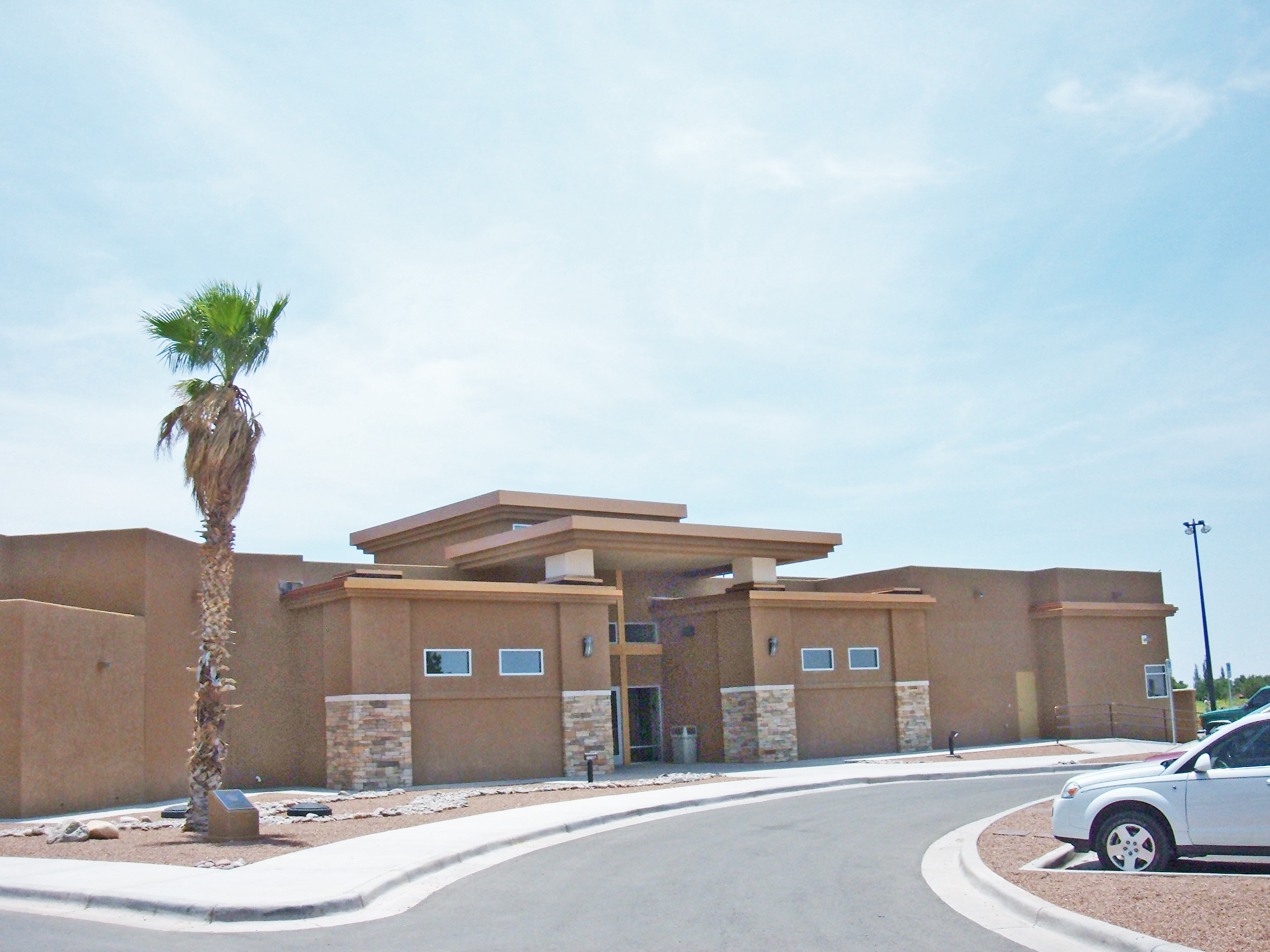
The new clubhouse at Desert Lakes Golf Course was constructed in 2007.

- Desert Lakes Golf Course is a city-owned golf course located at the south end of town on Hamilton Road at Desert Lakes Road. It is an 18-hole course. The clubhouse houses a restaurant and a pro shop. There is a PGA golf pro on duty at the course.

Not inside the city but nearby are several national and state parks. Oliver Lee Memorial State Park is about 10 miles south on U.S. Route 54, offers camping, hiking, and picnicking. White Sands National Park is located about 15 miles (24 km) southwest of Alamogordo along U.S. Route 70. The area is in the mountain-ringed Tularosa Basin valley area and comprises the southern part of a 275-square-mile (710 km^{2}) field of white sand dunes composed of gypsum crystals. The Lincoln National Forest, whose headquarters are in Alamogordo, is a mountainous area that starts about 10 miles (16 km) northeast of Alamogordo and offers hiking, fishing, and camping. The Sidney Paul Gordon Shooting Range, located about 3 miles (4.8 km) north of town at 19 Rock Cliff Road in La Luz, is a supervised range with rifle, pistol, and archery ranges. Several competitions are held at the range each month.

== Government ==
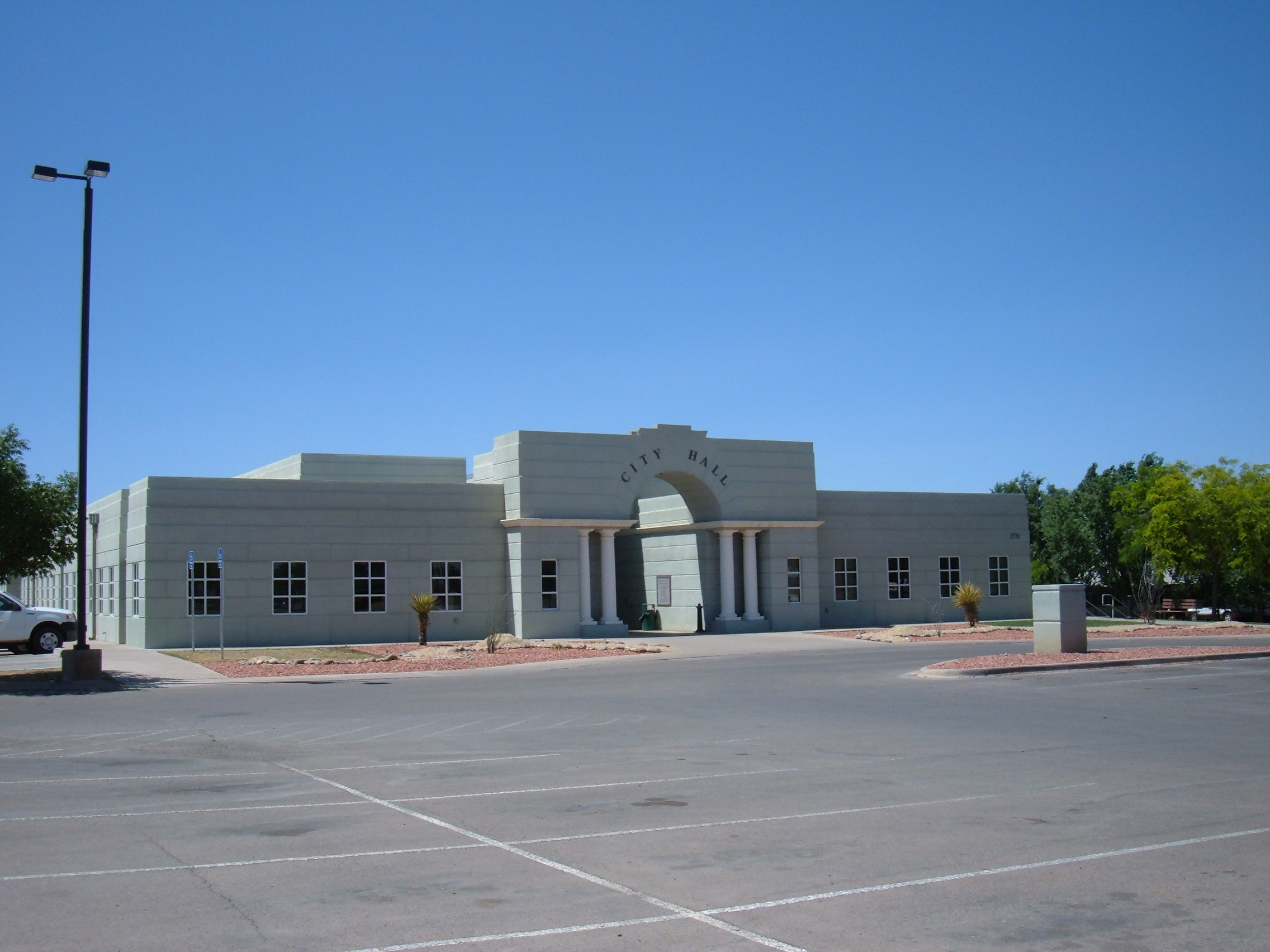
Alamogordo City Hall houses most of the city government administrative functions, as well as the Commission Chambers and the Municipal Court.

Alamogordo was incorporated in 1912. It is a charter city (also called a home rule city), and the charter is included as Part I of the Code of Ordinances. It has a Council-manager government form of government (called Commission/Manager in New Mexico). There are seven city commissioners, each elected from a district within the city, on staggered 4-year terms. The city manager is considered the chief executive officer of the city and is tasked to enforce and implement the City Council's directives and policy. The mayor is a member of the City Council. As of 2018, Richard Boss holds the position of mayor.

Alamogordo's fiscal year ends on June 30 each year; thus Fiscal Year 2008 runs from July 1, 2007, through June 30, 2008. The FY 2008 budget projects income of $61,454,402 and expenditures of $73,655,777. Sources of City government income and their percentages of the whole were: gross receipts tax (31%), miscellaneous (23%), grants (22%), user fees (19%), and property tax (5%).

== Education ==
New Mexico State University Alamogordo is a two-year community college established in 1958. As of 2016, it has approximately 1,800 students. There are two high schools (including the comprehensive Alamogordo High School), three middle schools, and 11 elementary schools in the Alamogordo Public School District. Prior to 2008 there were two private schools in Alamogordo: Legacy Christian Academy and Father James B. Hay Catholic School (the latter of the Roman Catholic Diocese of Las Cruces). A third private school, Imago Dei Academy, opened in August 2008 and provides a classical Christian education.

The New Mexico School for the Blind and Visually Impaired is a state school located in Alamogordo. The German government formerly operated the Deutsche Schule Alamogordo (German School) for children of German Air Force personnel stationed at the German tactical training center at Holloman Air Force Base until the 2019 withdrawal of German forces. Following this, the aforementioned Imago Dei Academy purchased the building.

Alamogordo Public Library serves Alamogordo and Otero County. The library at New Mexico State University Alamogordo is also open to the public.

== Media ==
The main newspaper in Alamogordo is Alamogordo Daily News (ADN), owned by MediaNews Group. ADN is published six days a week; on Monday, when it does not appear, subscribers receive the El Paso Times. ADN also publishes Hollogram, a free weekly newspaper distributed at the nearby Holloman Air Force Base and covering happenings on base. There was no alternative newspapers published in Alamogordo but The Ink, a free Las Cruces monthly newspaper devoted to the arts, is distributed in the city. There is now however a free online paper operated as citizen journalism produced by 2nd Life Media Alamogordo Town News The city government publishes City Profile, a monthly print newsletter that is mailed to all households in the city and is published electronically on the city web site, and Communiqué, a blog with city news.

One television station, KVBA-LD, broadcasts from Alamogordo. It has a religious format, and a weekly local news magazine broadcast Thursday through Saturday. Cable television service is provided by Baja Broadband.

There are two commercial radio broadcast companies, WP Broadcasting and Burt Broadcasting; each operates several stations in several formats. There are two "listener-supported" radio stations that do not carry advertising but depend on sponsorships and donations. KLAG has a gospel music radio format and some live coverage of local events, including many remote broadcasts from civic events. KALH-LP is a low-power FM station that carries a variety radio format, network news on the hour, and local news on some hours. Neither station is an NPR affiliate. The local NPR outlet is KRWG-FM in Las Cruces, which reaches Alamogordo through a local relay transmitter.

Several major motion pictures were filmed in or near Alamogordo. The 2007 film Transformers was shot primarily at White Sands Missile Range, with additional filming at Holloman Air Force Base, both in the Alamogordo area. Its 2009 sequel Transformers: Revenge of the Fallen also prominently featured these two military bases. The 2009 film Year One was shot partly at White Sands National Monument, near Alamogordo. Alamogordo was one of the fourteen cities profiled in the 2005 documentary 14 Days in America. The Otero County Film Office maintains a list of films shot partly or wholly in Alamogordo and Otero County.

In May 2013, Alamogordo's City Commission approved a deal for Canada-based film production company Fuel Industries to excavate the Atari landfill site. Fuel Entertainment partnered with Xbox Entertainment Studios and Lightbox to make a documentary about the massive 1983 Atari video game burial, said to be one of the gaming culture's greatest urban legends. On April 26, 2014, video game archaeologists began sifting through years of trash from the old Alamogordo landfill. The first batch of E.T. games was discovered after about three hours of digging, and hundreds more were found in the mounds of trash and dirt scooped by a backhoe. In the deal between the City of Alamogordo and Fuel Entertainment regarding the excavation, Fuel Entertainment was to be given 250 games or 10 percent of what was found.

== Infrastructure ==
=== Major highways ===
The major intercity surface routes from Alamogordo are U.S. Highways 54, 70, and 82, all of which are four-lane roads. The major north–south street within the city is White Sands Boulevard. The Charlie T. Lee Memorial Relief Route, which is designated as U.S. Route 54 and 70, is a bypass road constructed to the west of the city in 2001 to relieve congestion on White Sands Boulevard.

U.S. Route 70 and U.S. Route 54 traverses through the north and south ends of the city. At the south end of the city, White Sands Boulevard is a major named street that merges into U.S. Route 54/Charles T. Lee Memorial Relief Route, running south to El Paso, Texas. In the south part of the city, U.S. Route 70 splits from U.S. Route 54 in a southwestern direction towards Holloman Air Force Base, White Sands National Park, White Sands Missile Range, and Las Cruces. At the north end of the city, White Sands Boulevard and the Charles T. Lee Memorial Relief Route become a merged U.S. Route 54 and U.S. Route 70 running north to Tularosa. U.S. Route 82 starts at the same point and runs east to Cloudcroft and the mountain communities of Otero County, and then to Artesia. Meanwhile, in Tularosa, U.S. 70 and U.S. 54 both split in which U.S. 70 heads east through the mountains, and towards Ruidoso and Roswell, while U.S. 54 heads north towards Carrizozo and keeps going north until it heads east again starting in Vaughn.

=== Other transportation ===
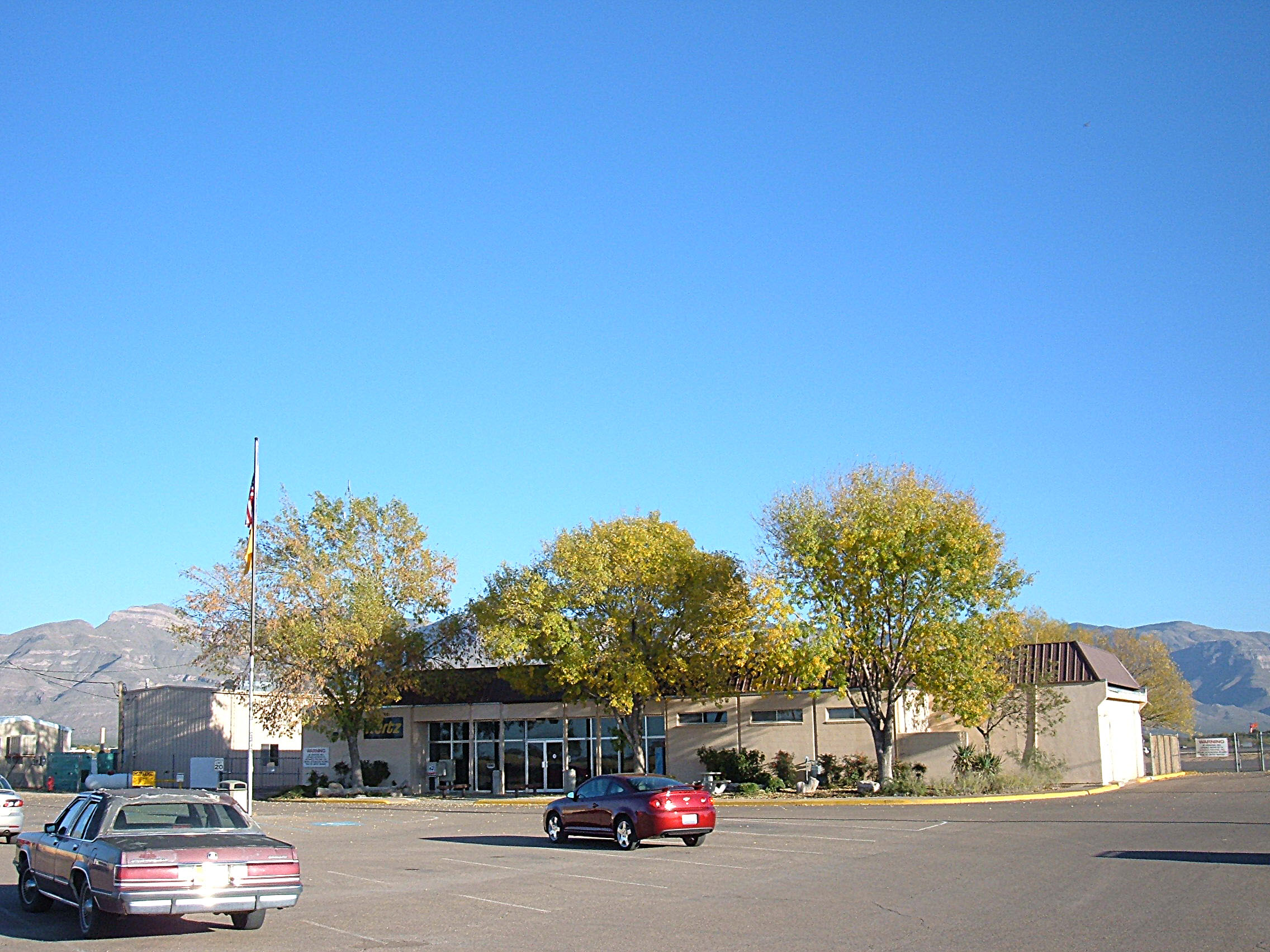
Alamogordo-White Sands Regional Airport provides scheduled commercial service and is used for general aviation.

Alamogordo-White Sands Regional Airport is the municipal airport located in the Alamogordo area. It is primarily used for general aviation. There is no longer scheduled commercial service from New Mexico Airlines, previously operated under a subsidy from the Essential Air Service program.

In 2008, Greyhound Lines offered intercity bus service to Alamogordo. As of 2017, there was a daily shuttle van service between Alamogordo and El Paso International Airport.

Z-Trans is the mass transit system, providing paratransit and scheduled service within the city center and to White Sands Mall, Holloman Air Force Base and Inn of the Mountain Gods Resort & Casino in Mescalero. Z-Trans is unusual in that it is privately owned (by Zia Therapy Center, a non-profit), although it does get some local and state subsidies.

Union Pacific provides railroad freight services. Currently there is no intercity passenger train service.

As of 2003, the Alamogordo city government was building a network of bike routes and walking routes. More information and maps are in the Alamogordo Comprehensive Plan. In 2005, the New Mexico Rails-to-Trails Association operated a Rails to Trails project to convert old railroad beds to walking trails. Its trail system in Otero County, the Cloud Climbing Rail Trail, is planned to eventually surround Alamogordo.

=== Utilities ===
Electric power is supplied within the city by PNM Resources. PNM also provides electrical power in the Tularosa Basin, while Otero County Electric Cooperative, a member cooperative of Tri-State Generation and Transmission Association and of Touchstone Energy, serves other areas of the county. Natural gas is supplied within the city by New Mexico Gas Company. Severn Trent operates both the water and sewage treatment facilities for the City of Alamogordo. Severn Trent maintains all water storage facilities, booster pump stations, city wells and treats the waste water to be re-used by the city to water the parks, Desert Lakes Golf Course and is sold to construction companies for dust control. Rural houses have individual wells.

Alamogordo has a dark sky ordinance to reduce the amount of light pollution in the night skies. The ordinance was passed in 1990 to promote the growth and scientific productivity of Apache Point Observatory. City streetlights are high-pressure sodium vapor lamps.

=== Healthcare ===
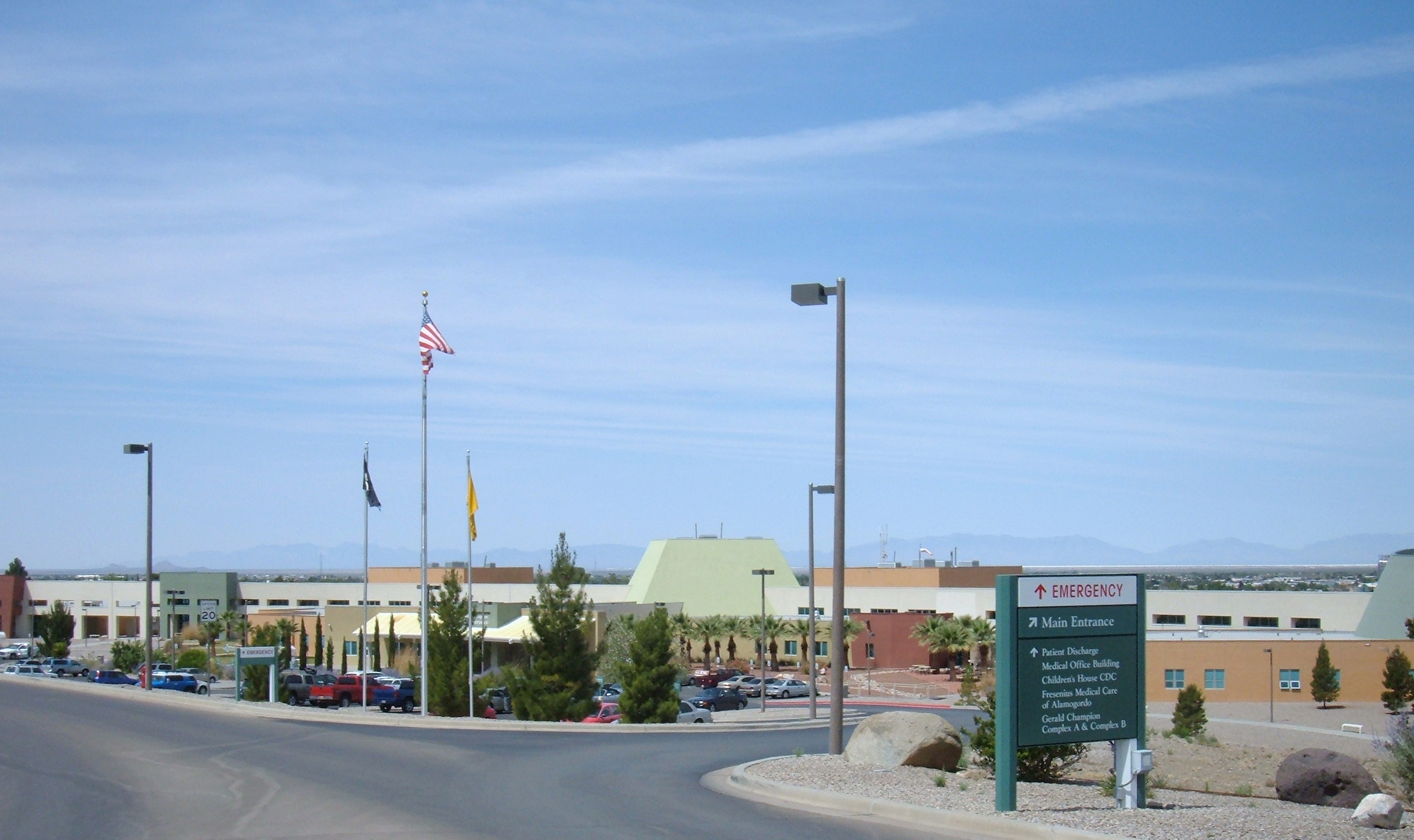
Gerald Champion Regional Medical Center serves Alamogordo and Holloman Air Force Base.

Gerald Champion Regional Medical Center is a private not-for-profit 99-bed general hospital that serves the Alamogordo area. The hospital is a shared military/civilian facility that is also the hospital for nearby Holloman Air Force Base.

The Otero County Community Health Council prepares a detailed health profile each year with many facts and figures about health in Otero County. Otero County is ranked in the middle of most health rankings within the state. New Mexico is near the bottom of most national rankings; for example, it was 38th in the United Health Foundation 2007 report, but has been slowly improving (it was 40th in 2005).

== Notable people ==
Among scientists, Edward Condon, a physicist and a past director of National Institute of Standards and Technology, was born in Alamogordo. Alan Hale, an astronomer and co-discoverer of Comet Hale-Bopp; was raised in Alamogordo and resides in nearby Cloudcroft.

Among politicians, Edwin L. Mechem, a past governor and United States Senator from New Mexico, was born in Alamogordo, as was Cindy Chavez, a past member of the city council of San Jose, California.

Monica Kim Garza is a painter who was born in Alamogordo.

Edward Lee Howard, a former CIA case agent who allegedly gave classified material to the Russians and later defected to the Soviet Union, was an Alamogordo native.

In sports, professional soccer player Adam Frye, jockey Donna Barton Brothers, and former professional American football cornerback Conrad Hamilton were all born in Alamogordo. Professional golf brothers Brad and Bart Bryant are from Alamogordo.

Alexis Duprey, crowned Miss New Mexico in 2013 and again in 2015, is from Alamogordo. Mai Shanley, who became Miss USA 1984, represented the city as Miss New Mexico USA.

The lead singer of the 2020 Grammy-nominated Black Pumas, Eric Burton, grew up in Alamogordo and graduated from Alamogordo High School.
