= Gerald Champion Regional Medical Center =

Coordinates: 32.924°N 105.934°W

CHRISTUS Health (Southern New Mexico)
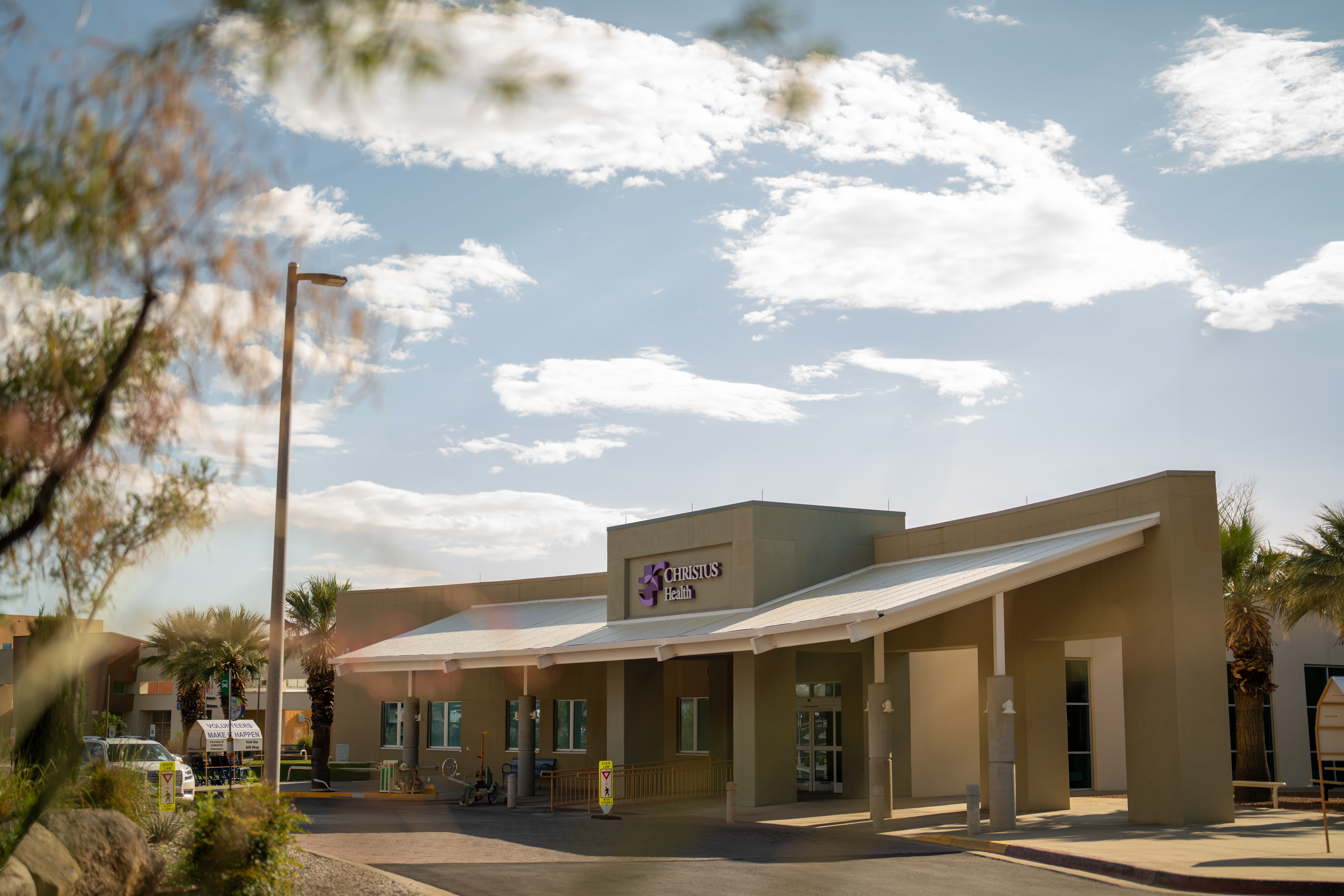
- Entrance and main building

Geography
- Location: Alamogordo, New Mexico, United States

Organization
- Care system: Medicare, Medicaid, Public
- Type: General

Services
- Emergency department: Level IV trauma center
- Beds: 99

History
- Founded: 1949

Links
- Website: http://www.christushealth.org
- Lists: Hospitals in New Mexico

Gerald Champion Regional Medical Center is a general hospital, owned and operated by CHRISTUS Health, that serves the Alamogordo, New Mexico area. It is the first military/civilian shared hospital facility in the United States.

GCRMC is accredited by the Det Norske Veritas. It opened in 1949, and in 2008 it was the largest non-governmental employer in Alamogordo, with 650 employees.

== Services ==
=== Shared military and civilian facility ===
With the opening of its new facility in 1999, GCRMC became the first hospital in the United States shared by active-duty military personnel and civilians. Air Force physicians from Holloman Air Force Base are credentialed at the hospital to admit and treat Department of Defense beneficiaries. The Air Force contributed $7 million for equipment for the new hospital in 1998 and DoD patients will get substantial discounts at the hospital for 15 years, with a guaranteed recovery of $7 million within the first seven years.

=== Medical services ===
The hospital is a Level III trauma center. It has 99 beds on a 65-acre (260,000 m^{2}) campus and facilities for MRI, CAT scan, dialysis, and sleep disorder studies, and has a medical laboratory on site. A Southwest Med Evac air ambulance helicopter, stationed full-time at the hospital, is used to transport patients from the mountain areas to GCRMC, and to transport patients from GCRMC to hospitals in El Paso, Las Cruces, and Albuquerque.

=== Catering ===
The hospital's food and nutrition services department operates a catering service, Mountain View Catering, that caters both on-site and off-site events and provides food service at the nearby New Mexico State University Alamogordo campus. It has been so successful that 60% of the department's revenue comes from outside the hospital.

== History ==
=== Founding and early years ===
The Otero County Hospital Association was formed in 1946 to build a basic county hospital. Gerald Champion Memorial Hospital was built at the corner of Tenth Street and Cuba Avenue in Alamogordo and was dedicated on Sunday, July 31, 1949 and officially opened for business on Tuesday, August 2, with 24 beds. A number of additions and renovations were made to the facility over the years.

The hospital is named after Gerald D. Champion, a local businessman and civic leader who was chairman of the Otero County Hospital Association during the fund drive for the first building. Champion died in a private airplane crash on February 3, 1948, during the fund drive. In addition to chairing the fund drive, Champion was mayor of Tularosa, operated hardware and building supply stores in Alamogordo and in Tularosa, was chairman of the Central Committee of the state Republican Party, and was active in many civic groups.

=== Transition to regional medical center ===
The hospital moved to a new building on Scenic Drive near the New Mexico State University Alamogordo campus in 1999, and changed its name to Gerald Champion Regional Medical Center. The original building remained vacant for several years and when no use could be found for it was torn down in 2003.

The new building was constructed at 152,000 square feet (14,100 m^{2}) at a construction cost of $25,841,000. It won Building Design & Construction magazine's Grand Award: Institutional in 2000. The program manager was American Health Facilities Development (a subsidiary of Quorum Health Resources), the architects were Collins Reisenbichler Architects (since merged with Perkins and Will), and the general contractor was Robins & Morton.

GCRMC celebrated its 60th anniversary on August 22, 2009, with the opening of a renovated entryway and a new obstetrics unit. In 2011, the hospital filed for Chapter 11 bankruptcy protection.

== Acquisition by CHRISTUS Health ==
On June 30, 2023, Gerald Champion Regional Medical Center (GCRMC) announced an agreement to join CHRISTUS Health, a Catholic, not-for-profit health system based in Irving, Texas. The acquisition became effective on July 1, 2023, aiming to preserve and enhance high-quality healthcare in the Alamogordo area. CHRISTUS Health committed to investing in capital improvements, expanding recruitment and retention efforts, and growing clinical capabilities at GCRMC.

The merger included plans for CHRISTUS Health to fund a new local foundation with a $240 million donation and invest $100 million in capital over ten years to support GCRMC's operations and services.
