= VP8 Image Analyzer =

Analog computer

The VP-8 Image Analyzer was an analog computer produced by Pete Schumacher of Interpretation Systems Incorporated (ISI) in 1972.

== Imaging the Shroud of Turin ==
The VP-8 Image Analyzer has been used to image the Shroud of Turin. The VP8 makes a brightness map of whatever data it processes. White areas on the map appear to be higher in elevation; black areas appear lower in elevation, and mid-range areas appear between these two extremes.

When the device was used with photographs or paintings, the result was a distorted and inaccurate representation of the original image. However, the Shroud image produced an accurate three-dimensional representation of the man depicted on the Shroud, with facial features, arms, legs and chest all contoured correctly. This was shown to Peter Schumacher, the inventor of the device, and he later recalled his astonishment:

"I had never heard of the Shroud of Turin before that moment. I had no idea what I was looking at. However, the results are unlike anything I have processed through the VP-8 Analyzer, before or since. Only the Shroud of Turin has produced these results from a VP-8 Image Analyzer isometric projection study."

== Other applications ==
=== Energy and mineral resource exploration ===
The Mississippi Mineral Resources Institute used the VP-8 Image Analyzer from 1973 to 1977 to make profile maps of "several geologic areas in Mississippi" to explore possible sites of mineral or petroleum reserves. Using isometric profiling from the VP-8 unit, scientists from the Institute analyzed LANDSAT images of the region. Their analysis supported findings of the production unit of Amoco that the area of Possumneck, Mississippi contains a large anticline, a potentially significant reserve of oil and natural gas. Nineteen wildcat wells were drilled in Attala County, Mississippi by 17 different oil refineries, both before and after the 1970s, but all were later plugged and abandoned with little or no actual oil having been found.

=== Forestry resource management ===
Scientists at the University of Minnesota, using a NASA grant in 1973, were able to use the VP-8 Image Analyzer to create density slices from infrared aerial photos from the Chippewa National Forest region. The goal was to better predict areas likely to have aquatic vegetation, which define peatlands. These areas lessen the severity of floods. By identifying these areas, they can potentially be buttressed and preserved by "biological treatment of secondary effluent."

The VP-8 did not perform as well as anticipated in the study, failing to provide information that had not already been gleaned from the filtered infrared images. The reason was cited as "electronic drift" caused by a malfunction of the device itself. The study authors suggested the device probably needed "additional adjustment by the manufacturer."

The NASA Skylab program attempted to use the VP-8 Image Analyzer for more precise measurement of timber resources, inputting to the device Earth images returned from space, to better inventory forested areas in the Trinity Alps of northern California. The VP-8 Image Analyzer malfunctioned again, experiencing "many electrical and other engineering problems" and the data returned by the VP-8 was unable to be used.

The University of Tennessee in partnership with NASA used the VP-8 to analyze Landsat program imagery for the purpose of detecting declines in forested areas due to coal strip mining. Although the study was largely unsuccessful due to cloud cover at the time the images were made, the researchers did discover that the imaging systems "must be tied to a very good local ground to eliminate noise problems" and that video lines must be properly terminated. Thus, the study may have contributed to helping later researchers understand the proper use and handling of the VP-8 unit.

=== Predicting rice acreage ===
NASA also stated in a 1973 report that it was planning to use the VP-8 to perform feasibility studies on trending the acreage of rice in the "California rice-growing region." Rice is a staple throughout the world, and knowledge of trends could be used in predicting where malnutrition and starvation are likely to arise. Data on trended rice acreage can also be used to predict water use in the areas where the rice is grown. These studies were suspended due to problems with the unit, which were possibly caused by underexposure of the test images, or by the analyzer's difficulty in reading densitometry data from black and white film; however, once color infrared (CIR) images taken from NASA-supported aircraft were used, performance results of the device improved.
