= National Register of Historic Places listings in Otero County, New Mexico =

Location of Otero County in New Mexico.

This is a list of the National Register of Historic Places listings in Otero County, New Mexico.

This is intended to be a complete list of the properties and districts on the National Register of Historic Places in Otero County, New Mexico, United States. Latitude and longitude coordinates are provided for many National Register properties and districts; these locations may be seen together in a map.

There are 32 properties and districts listed on the National Register in the county. All of the places within the county on the National Register are also listed on the State Register of Cultural Properties.

This National Park Service list is complete through NPS recent listings posted December 19, 2025.

Contents: NRHP in New Mexico by county
Bernalillo – Catron – Chaves – Cibola – Colfax – Curry – De Baca – Doña Ana – Eddy – Grant – Guadalupe – Harding – Hidalgo – Lea – Lincoln – Los Alamos – Luna – McKinley – Mora – Otero – Quay – Rio Arriba – Roosevelt – San Juan – San Miguel – Sandoval – Santa Fe – Sierra – Socorro – Taos – Torrance – Union – Valencia

== Current listings ==
| | Name on the Register | Image | Date listed | Location | City or town | Description |
|---|---|---|---|---|---|---|
| 1 | Administration Building | Administration Building | May 16, 1989 (#88001564) | 1900 N. White Sands Boulevard, New Mexico School for the Blind and Visually Impaired; 32°54′51″N 105°57′33″W | Alamogordo | |
| 2 | Alamogordo Woman's Club | Alamogordo Woman's Club | August 4, 2003 (#03000734) | Southeastern corner of the junction of 12th St. and Indiana Ave. 32°54′12″N 105°57′22″W | Alamogordo | |
| 3 | Archeological Site No. AR-03-08-02-409 | | April 13, 1998 (#98000278) | Address Restricted | Timberon | |
| 4 | Archeological Site No. AR-03-08-02-415 | | April 13, 1998 (#98000277) | Address Restricted | Timberon | |
| 5 | Archeological Site No. AR-03-08-03-128 | | November 24, 1995 (#95001479) | Address Restricted | Queen | |
| 6 | Auditorium and Recreation Building | Auditorium and Recreation Building | May 16, 1989 (#88001565) | 1900 N. White Sands Boulevard, New Mexico School for the Blind and Visually Impaired; 32°54′49″N 105°57′30″W | Alamogordo | |
| 7 | Bluewater Lookout Complex | | January 28, 1988 (#87002486) | Lincoln National Forest; 32°44′28″N 105°27′54″W | Weed | |
| 8 | Bridge A 249-Cloudcroft, New Mexico | | December 29, 2015 (#15000948) | 65 E. Little Mexican Ave. 32°57′36″N 105°44′55″W | Cloudcroft vicinity | |
| 9 | Carrisa Lookout Complex | | January 28, 1988 (#87002488) | Lincoln National Forest; 32°40′34″N 105°37′09″W | Long Canyon | |
| 10 | Central Receiving Building | Central Receiving Building | May 16, 1989 (#88001566) | 1900 N. White Sands Boulevard, New Mexico School for the Blind and Visually Impaired; 32°54′51″N 105°57′29″W | Alamogordo | |
| 11 | Circle Cross Ranch Headquarters | | November 17, 1980 (#80002563) | Southwest of Sacramento; 32°39′26″N 105°42′20″W | Sacramento | |
| 12 | Fresnal Shelter | | April 13, 1998 (#98000315) | Address Restricted | High Rolls | |
| 13 | Juan Garcia House | | October 23, 1980 (#80002559) | Tularosa St. 32°58′40″N 105°56′31″W | La Luz | |
| 14 | Hay Canyon Logging Camp | | January 2, 1992 (#91001880) | Address Restricted | Mayhill | |
| 15 | Hubbell Canyon Log Chute | | December 31, 1991 (#91001882) | Address Restricted | Cloudcroft | |
| 16 | Infirmary Building | Infirmary Building | May 16, 1989 (#88001567) | 1900 N. White Sands Boulevard, New Mexico School for the Blind and Visually Impaired; 32°55′19″N 105°57′30″W | Alamogordo | |
| 17 | Jackson House | Jackson House | January 28, 2004 (#03001511) | 1700 9th St. 32°53′56″N 105°56′23″W | Alamogordo | |
| 18 | La Luz Historic District | La Luz Historic District | October 23, 1980 (#80002560) | Off State Road 83; 32°58′42″N 105°56′33″W | La Luz | |
| 19 | La Luz Pottery Factory | La Luz Pottery Factory | May 29, 1979 (#79001544) | 2 miles (3.2 km) east of La Luz; 32°58′45″N 105°54′08″W | La Luz | |
| 20 | Oliver Lee Dog Canyon Ranch | Oliver Lee Dog Canyon Ranch | May 26, 2015 (#15000263) | Address Restricted | Alamogordo vicinity | |
| 21 | Mayhill Administrative Site | | June 1, 1989 (#89000476) | U.S. Route 82, 1.5 miles north of Mayhill; 32°54′32″N 105°28′10″W | Mayhill | |
| 22 | Mexican Canyon Trestle | Mexican Canyon Trestle | May 7, 1979 (#79001543) | Northwest of Cloudcroft off State Road 83; 32°57′49″N 105°44′52″W | Cloudcroft | Multi-tier railroad trestle bridge, worth stopping at viewpoint for. |
| 23 | Orogrande School | | January 3, 2025 (#100011237) | 1158 Carrol Street. 32°22′51″N 106°05′37″W | Orogrande | |
| 24 | Queen Anne House | Queen Anne House | October 23, 1980 (#80002561) | Kearney St. 32°58′40″N 105°56′31″W | La Luz | |
| 25 | St. Joseph Apache Mission Church | St. Joseph Apache Mission Church | February 1, 2005 (#04001588) | 626 Mission Trail; 33°09′24″N 105°46′03″W | Mescalero | |
| 26 | D.H. Sutherland House | D.H. Sutherland House | October 23, 1980 (#80002562) | Main St. 32°58′40″N 105°56′31″W | La Luz | |
| 27 | Tularosa Original Townsite District | Tularosa Original Townsite District | February 2, 1979 (#79001545) | U.S. Routes 54/70; 33°04′28″N 106°01′01″W | Tularosa | |
| 28 | US Post Office-Alamogordo | US Post Office-Alamogordo | May 18, 2000 (#00000510) | 1101 New York Ave. 32°54′03″N 105°57′32″W | Alamogordo | |
| 29 | Weed Lookout Tower | | January 28, 1988 (#87002487) | Lincoln National Forest; 32°48′23″N 105°33′33″W | Sacramento | |
| 30 | White Sands Historic District | White Sands Historic District | June 23, 1988 (#88000751) | U.S. Routes 70/82; 32°46′47″N 106°10′18″W | Alamogordo | |
| 31 | Wills Canyon Spur Trestle | | December 31, 1991 (#91001881) | Address Restricted | Cloudcroft | |
| 32 | Wofford Lookout Complex | Wofford Lookout Complex | January 28, 1988 (#87002484) | Lincoln National Forest; 32°59′48″N 105°42′40″W | Cloudcroft | |

== See also ==
- List of National Historic Landmarks in New Mexico
- National Register of Historic Places listings in New Mexico
