= KRSY =

KRSY may refer to:

- KRSY (AM), a radio station (1230 AM) licensed to Alamogordo, New Mexico, United States
- KRSY-FM, a radio station (92.7 FM) licensed to La Luz, New Mexico, United States

== See also ==
- Krsy, a municipality in the Czech Republic
