= La Luz Pottery Factory =

- U.S. National Register of Historic Places
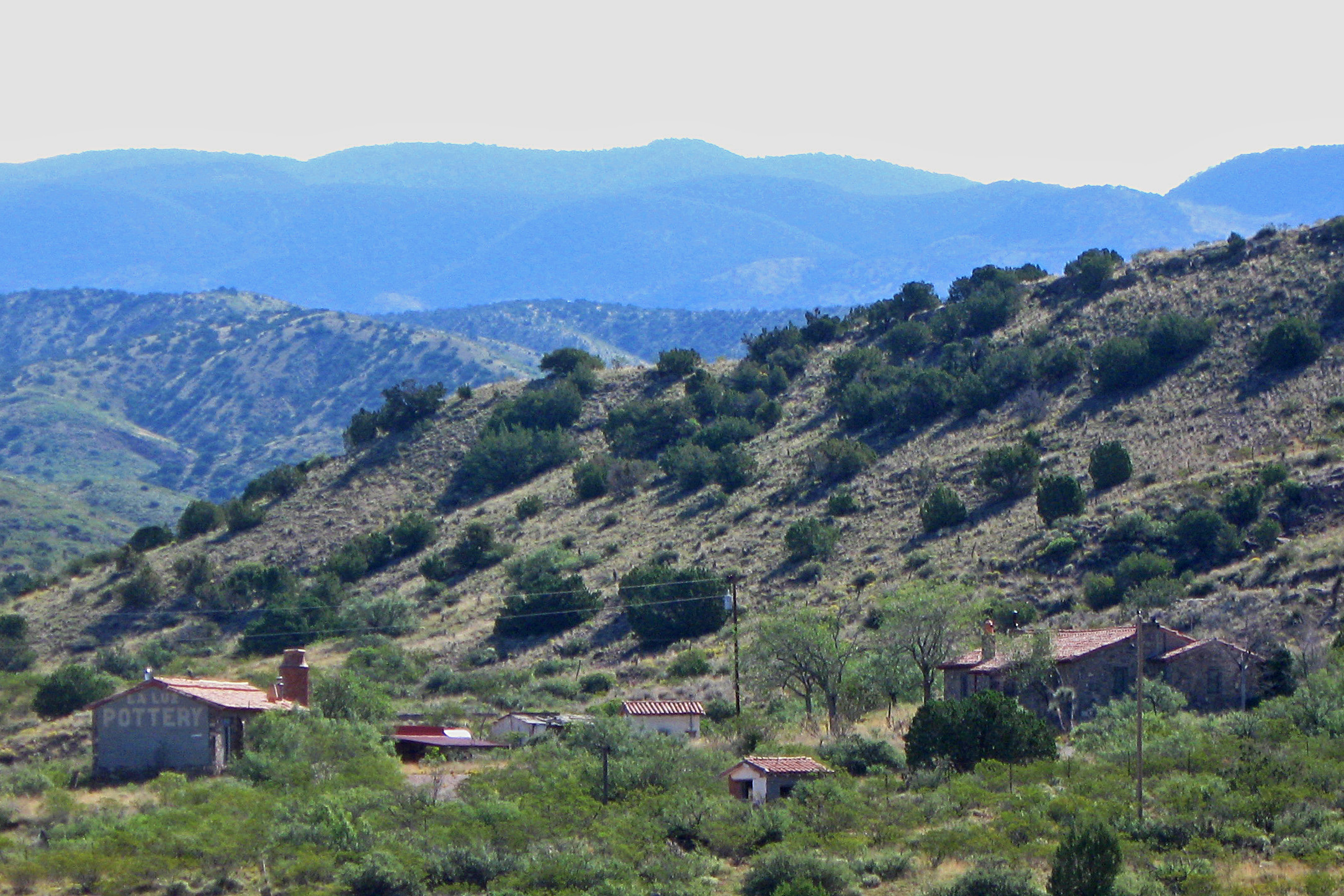
- The factory in 2009

- Location within New Mexico Location within the United States
- Nearest city: La Luz, New Mexico
- Coordinates: 32°58′45″N 105°54′08″W
- Area: 9 acres (3.6 ha)
- Built: 1929
- Built by: Rowland Hazard
- NRHP reference No.: 79001544
- Added to NRHP: May 29, 1979

The La Luz Pottery Factory is a former ceramic production facility located near La Luz in New Mexico. It was built circa 1929, becoming a vital center of ceramic production in the region. In its earliest years, the factory, founded by Rowland Hazard, focused on manufacturing roofing tiles, supplying durable materials for local and regional construction, and flooring tiles. The tiles were used in buildings like the Albuquerque Little Theatre.

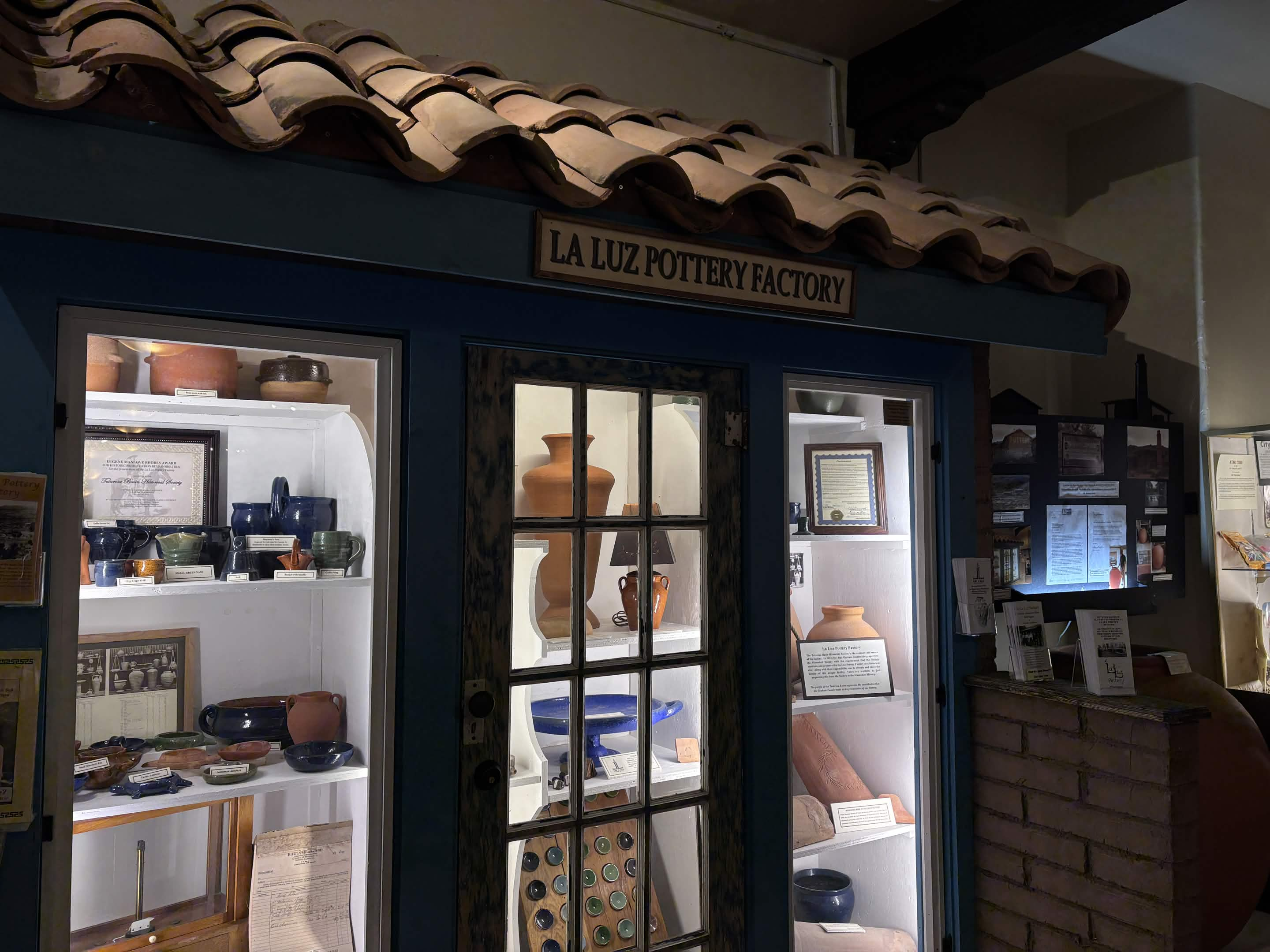
La Luz Pottery Exhibit located in the Tularosa Basin Historical Society Museum.

As production expanded and techniques advanced, the factory evolved beyond its original purpose and began producing a wide range of pottery until it closed down in 1942. In 2012, the Tularosa Basin Historical Society acquired the property for preservation.

== Factory complex ==
The factory complex is situated on a 235-acre property, much of which is still intact today and able to be visited through the Tularosa Basin Historical Society Museum's tours and pottery classes. The site offers a rare and comprehensive look at an early 20th century industrial pottery operation. Several of the original buildings still stand, preserving the layout and functionality of the working factory.

=== Surviving structures include ===
- original laboratory, now preserved as a mini museum
- showroom
- two kilns
- commissary
- bunkhouse
- clay processing facility
- blacksmith shop

Together, these buildings illustrate the complete process of pottery production, from raw material preparation to finished goods, as well as the daily life of those who lived and worked on site. The complex has been listed on the National Register of Historic Places since May 29, 1979.

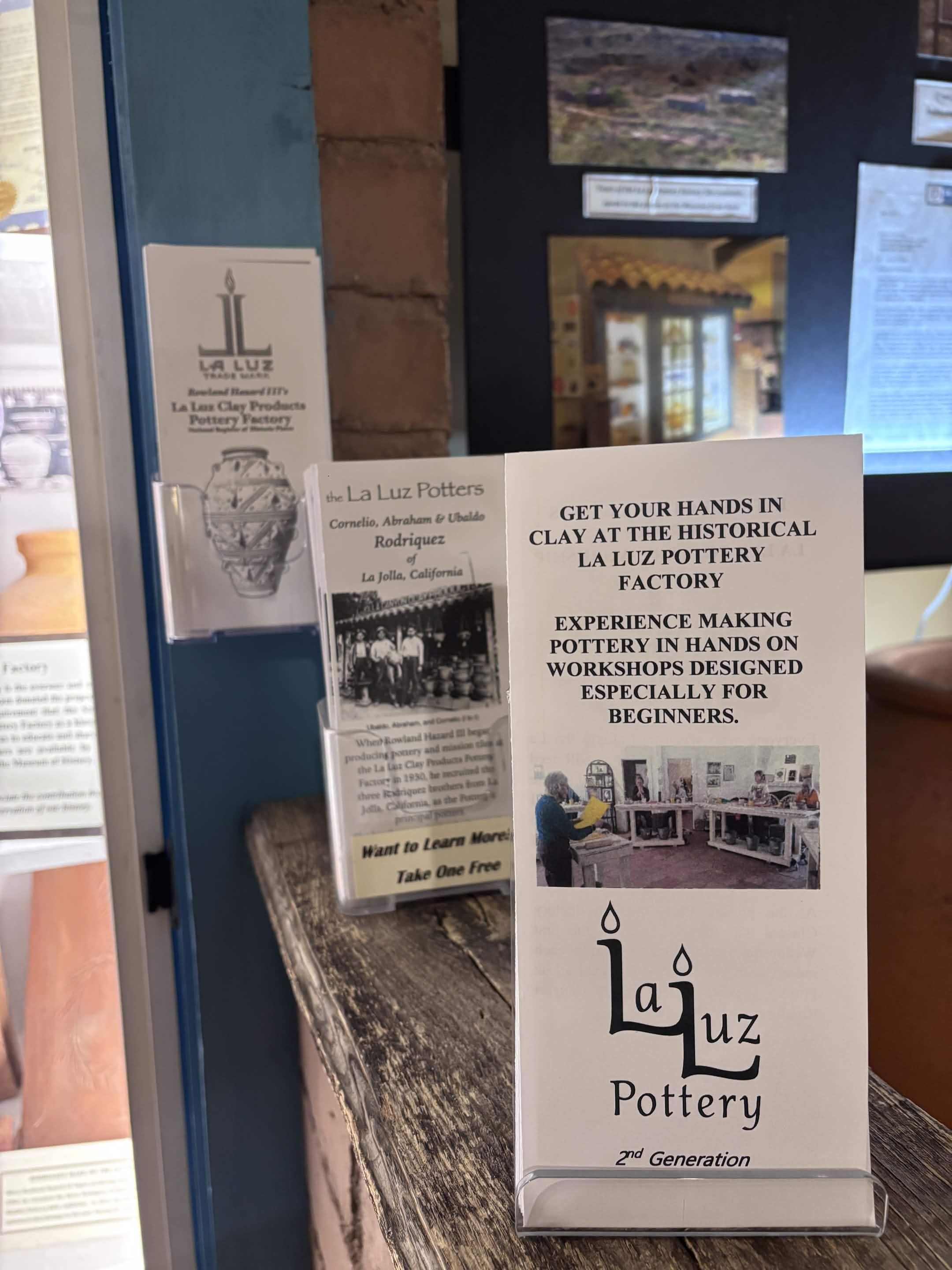
Pamphlets for La Luz tours and classes

== Craftsmanship and legacy ==
The factory initially produced roofing tiles and later expanded its output to include other types of pottery. Its production processes involved clay preparation, glazing and firing. Workers modified these techniques over time, and the factory produced items in a range of shapes, finishes and decorative styles.

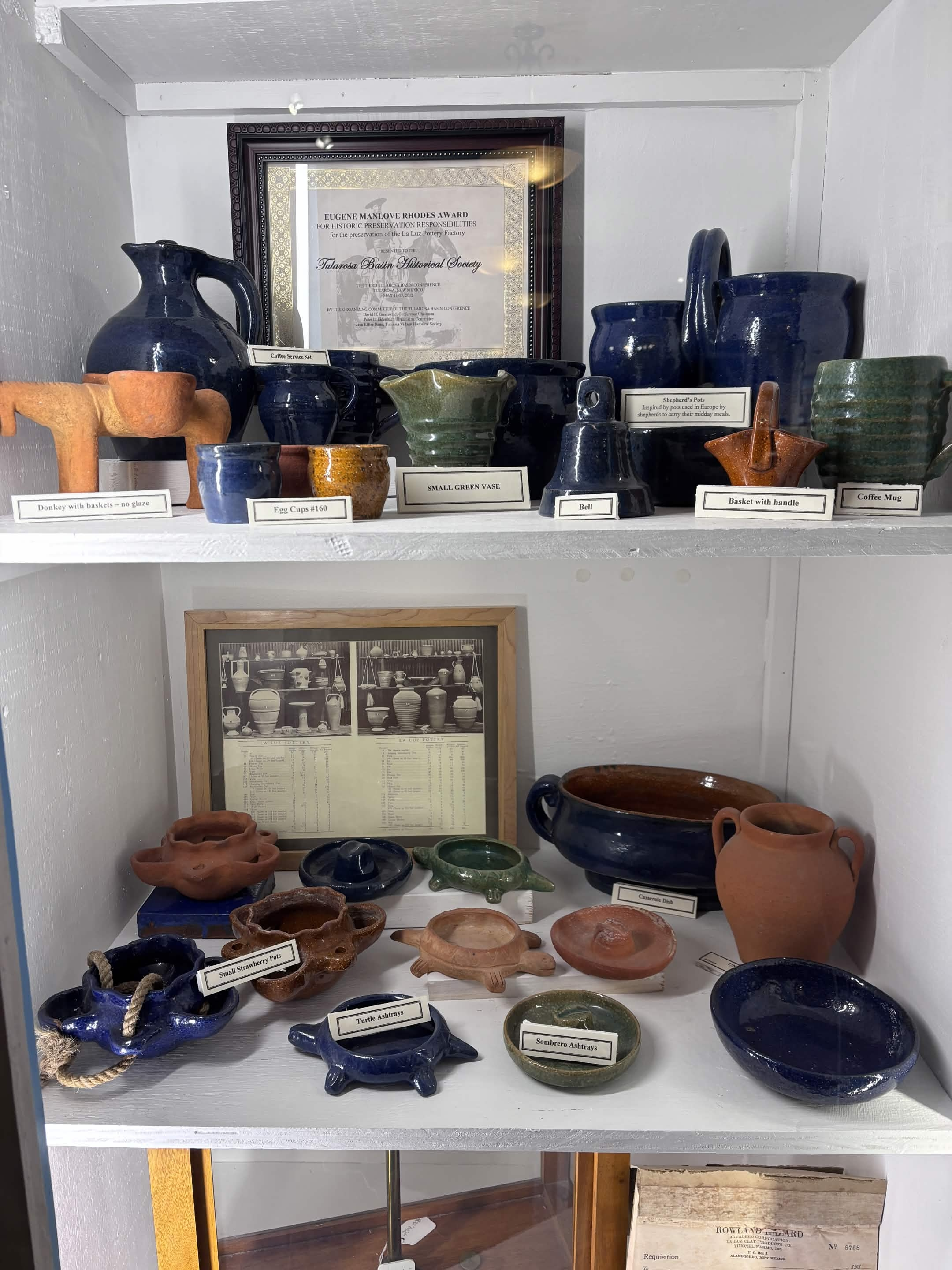
Pots, trays, and bowls

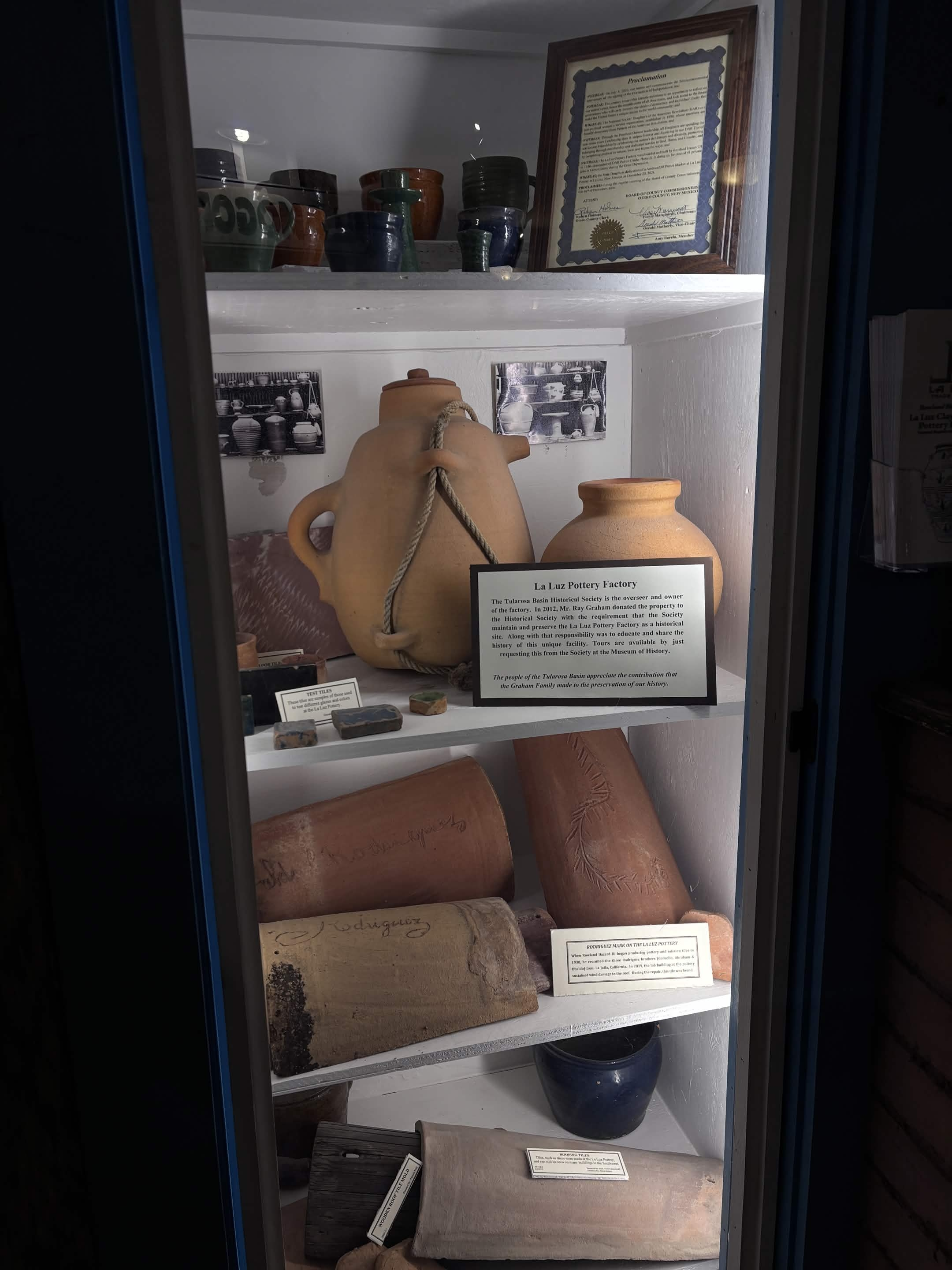
Larger pots, fragments of works

Over time, more than 90 distinct pottery designs were developed, ranging from functional household items to decorative and architectural pieces. Each style reflected the factory's commitment to durability, usability, and visual appeal. the pottery produced here was not only intended for everyday usage but also designed to stand the test of time both physically and aesthetically. Today, these pieces provide valuable insight to early 20th century ceramic techniques and the evolving tastes of the period. Many preserved pieces, as well as new locally made pieces from tour and class visitors are on display at the Tularosa Basin Historical Society Museum

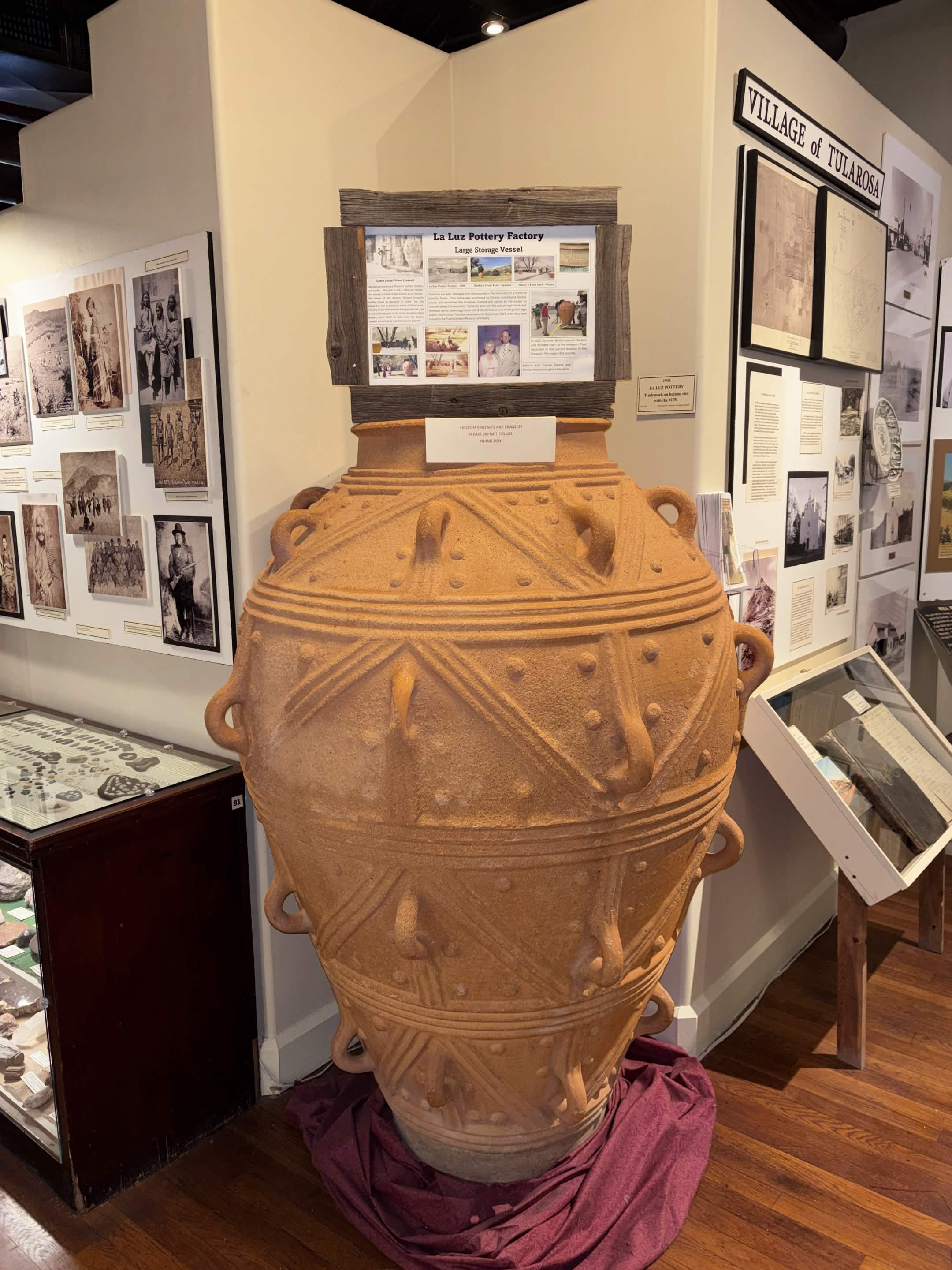
Crete Large Pithos

== National Historic Recognition ==
The quality and originality of the factory's pottery earned it widespread recognition during its years of operation. Its products were collected well beyond the local region, reaching national and international markets and attracting the attention of collectors, designers, and historians. The broad distribution and continued demand for these pieces reflect the factory's influence within the larger context of American ceramics and industrial design.

Long after the factory ceased operations in 1949, its work continues to be studied. Surviving pottery pieces are actively sought by collectors and frequently featured in private collections, exhibitions and scholarly research. The preservation of the factory complex itself strengthens the legacy, offering a physical connection to the people, processes, and craftsmanship that defined the site. Together, the pottery and surviving buildings ensure that the factory's contributions to the industrial and artistic history remain visible for future generations.

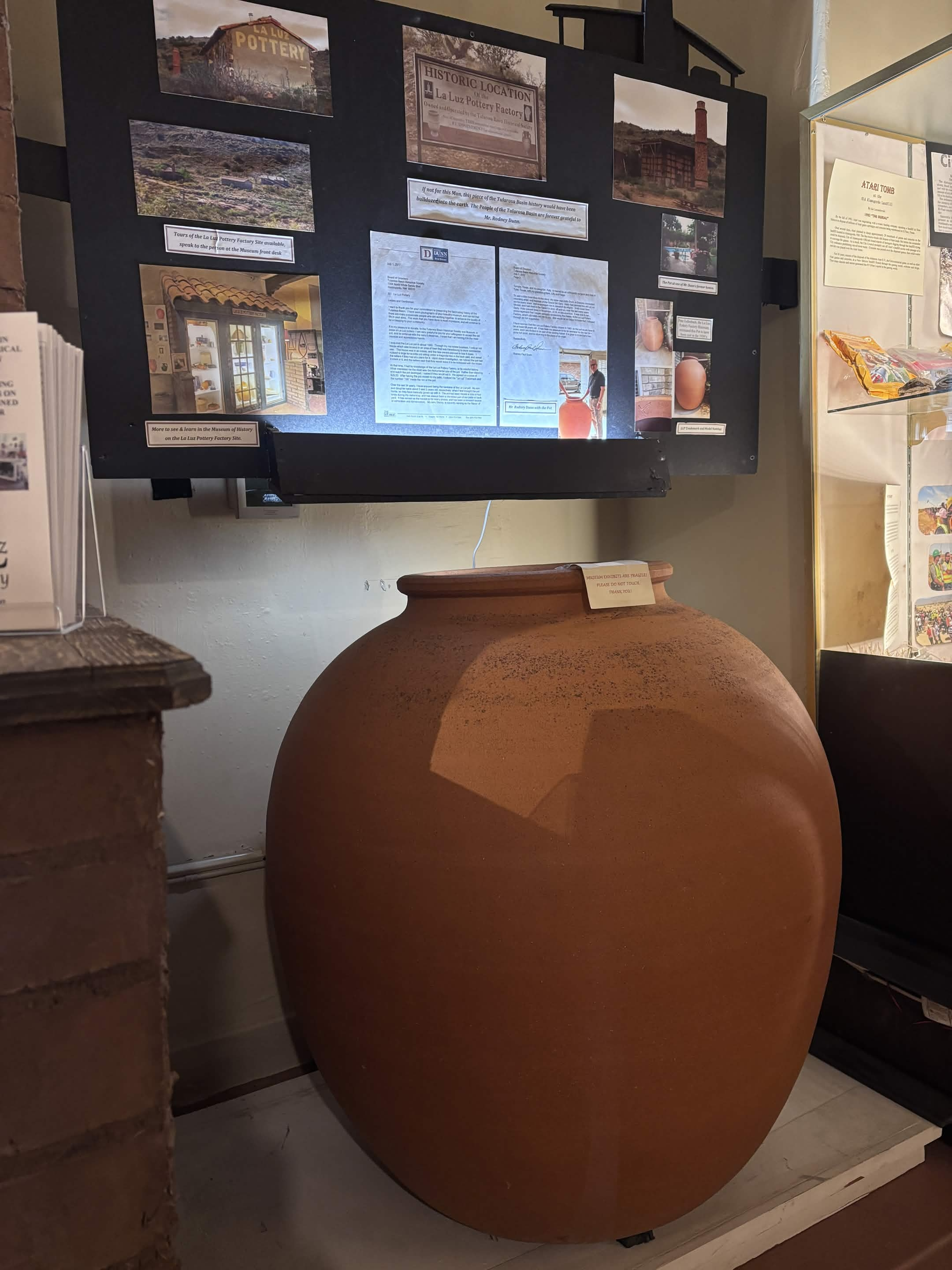
Large Storage Pot donated by Rodney Dunn
