= Alamogordo Museum of History =

Tularosa Basin Museum of History
- Former name: Tularosa Basin Historical Society Museum
- Established: 1970
- Location: 1004 N. White Sands Blvd. Alamogordo, New Mexico
- Coordinates: 32.903641°N 105.960656°W
- Type: History museum
- Public transit access: Z-Trans stop across street
- Website: http://www.tbhsmuseum.org

The Tularosa Basin Museum of History, formerly the Tularosa Basin Historical Society Museum, is a history museum holding a collection of historical photographs, documents, and relics from Otero County, New Mexico. The museum is located in Alamogordo, New Mexico, and is owned and operated by the Tularosa Basin Historical Society.

== Collection ==
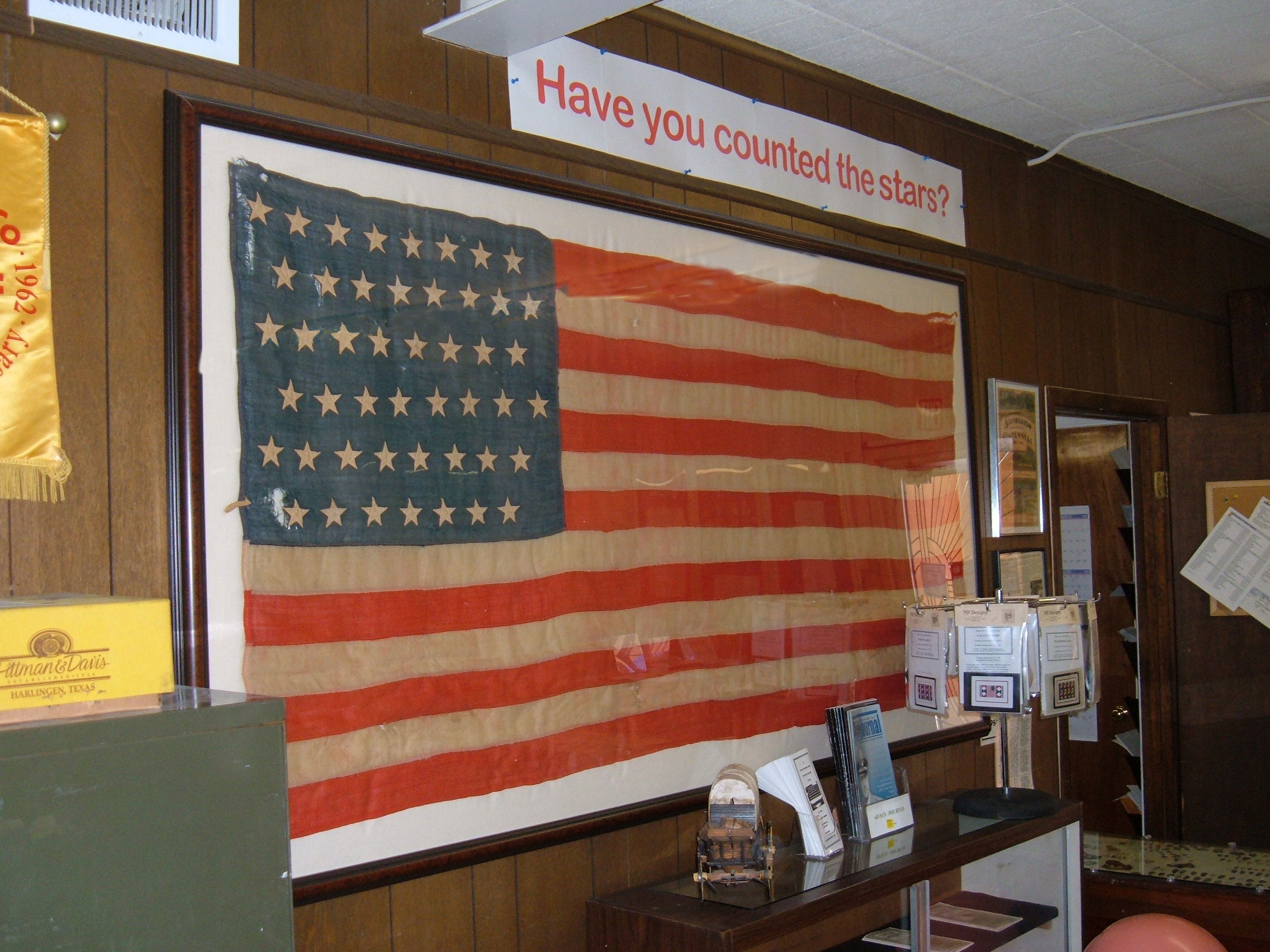
The museum's 47-star U. S. Flag

=== 47-star flag ===
The prize item in the collection is a 47-star U.S. flag. New Mexico was admitted to the union as the 47th state on January 6, 1912, followed by Arizona as the 48th state on February 14, 1912. The Flag Act of 1818 specifies "That on the admission of every new state into the Union, one star be added to the union of the flag; and that such addition shall take effect of the fourth day of July then next succeeding such admission." On July 4, 1912, the official flag design jumped from 46 to 48 stars, and there never was an official 47-star flag.

The provenance of the museum's 47-star flag is unknown, although it presumably was manufactured to celebrate New Mexico's entry into the Union. The flag hung for many years in a bar in Blue Lake, California. The bar owner, Wade Topping, a former resident of Alamogordo, recognized the significance of the flag and donated it to the museum in 1999.

The 47-star flags are very rare and the number in existence is unknown. One flag is in the collection of the Museum at the Palace of the Governors in Santa Fe, New Mexico. The curator at the Palace, Diana De Santis, researched the subject and also found a reported 47-star flag in the collection of the Fort McHenry National Monument and Historic Shrine in Baltimore, Maryland. Bob Adamowski of Bellevue, Washington donated a 47-star flag to the Smithsonian Institution in 2005.

=== Other museum features ===
The museum collection holds personal accounts, relics and photographs of local history. It holds a bison trophy head, a collection of pottery from the La Luz Pottery Factory, and artifacts from prehistoric Native American tribes that were found in caves above Alamogordo. The collection includes over 3,000 historical photographs of the local area and an archive of historical documents.

The museum gift shop sells all TBHS publications and many other local history titles. There is a collection of local history books and documents that visitors can use inside the museum.

The museum originally shared a building with the Alamogordo Chamber of Commerce at 1301 N. White Sands Blvd. In 2006, the City of Alamogordo received a $300,000 grant from the State Legislature to buy a historic adobe building at the corner of White Sands Blvd. and Tenth Street as a new home for the museum. The museum had planned to move by the end of 2008, but as of July 2008 this plan has stalled due to lack of money to renovate the building.

As of 2022, the museum is now located in that renovated historic adobe building.

== Tularosa Basin Historical Society ==
The museum is operated by Tularosa Basin Historical Society, a volunteer organization created in 1964 to preserve the history of the Tularosa Basin. The society is funded through donations, fundraisers, and membership dues. As of 2005, it had 220 members. The society publishes The Pioneer (OCLC 49596229), a biannual series of monographs about local history. It occasionally publishes other titles, such as a two-volume collection of pioneer family histories.
