= Circle Cross Ranch Headquarters =

- U.S. National Register of Historic Places
- Location within New Mexico
- Location: Southwest of Sacramento, New Mexico
- Coordinates: 32°39′26″N 105°42′20″W
- Area: 40 acres (16 ha)
- Built: 1905, 1906
- NRHP reference No.: 80002563
- Added to NRHP: November 17, 1980

The Circle Cross Ranch Headquarters, in Otero County, New Mexico, near Sacramento, New Mexico, was partly built in 1906. It was listed on the National Register of Historic Places in 1980. It has also been known as the Oliver M. Lee House and Ranch.

The listing included four contributing buildings on 40 acres (16 ha).

The main house is a one-and-a-half-story 50 by 50 feet (15 m × 15 m) house, built upon a raised, poured concrete basement, and is surrounded by a wood-frame veranda. It has a hipped roof broken by two dormers on each side and by four chimneys. The main floor, which has a board-and-batten exterior, served as living quarters. The basement level, which is at grade on three sides, has two kitchens, a mess hall, and an office, and served as the ranch headquarters for Lee.

Also on the property are a historic 50 by 140 feet (15 m × 43 m) wooden barn, a log barn, and a blacksmith shop. The log barn, built in 1905, served at first as the residence for the Lee family.
