= KRSY-FM =

- La Luz, New Mexico; United States
- Broadcast area: Alamogordo, New Mexico
- Frequency: 92.7 MHz
- Branding: Coyote Country 92.7

Programming
- Format: Country

Ownership
- Owner: Katlyn and David Grice; (Exciter Media LLC)
- Sister stations: KNMZ, KRSY

History
- Former call signs: KPSA (1987–1999)

Technical information
- Licensing authority: FCC
- Facility ID: 14028
- Class: A
- ERP: 6,000 watts
- HAAT: −219.0 meters (−718.5 ft)
- Transmitter coordinates: 32°53′31.6″N 105°56′42″W

Links
- Public license information: Public file; LMS
- Webcast: Listen Live
- Website: 927coyotecountry.com

KRSY-FM (92.7 MHz) is a radio station broadcasting a Country music format. Licensed to La Luz, New Mexico, United States, the station is currently owned by Katlyn and David Grice, through licensee Exciter Media LLC.
