= La Luz Historic District =

- U.S. National Register of Historic Places
- U.S. Historic district
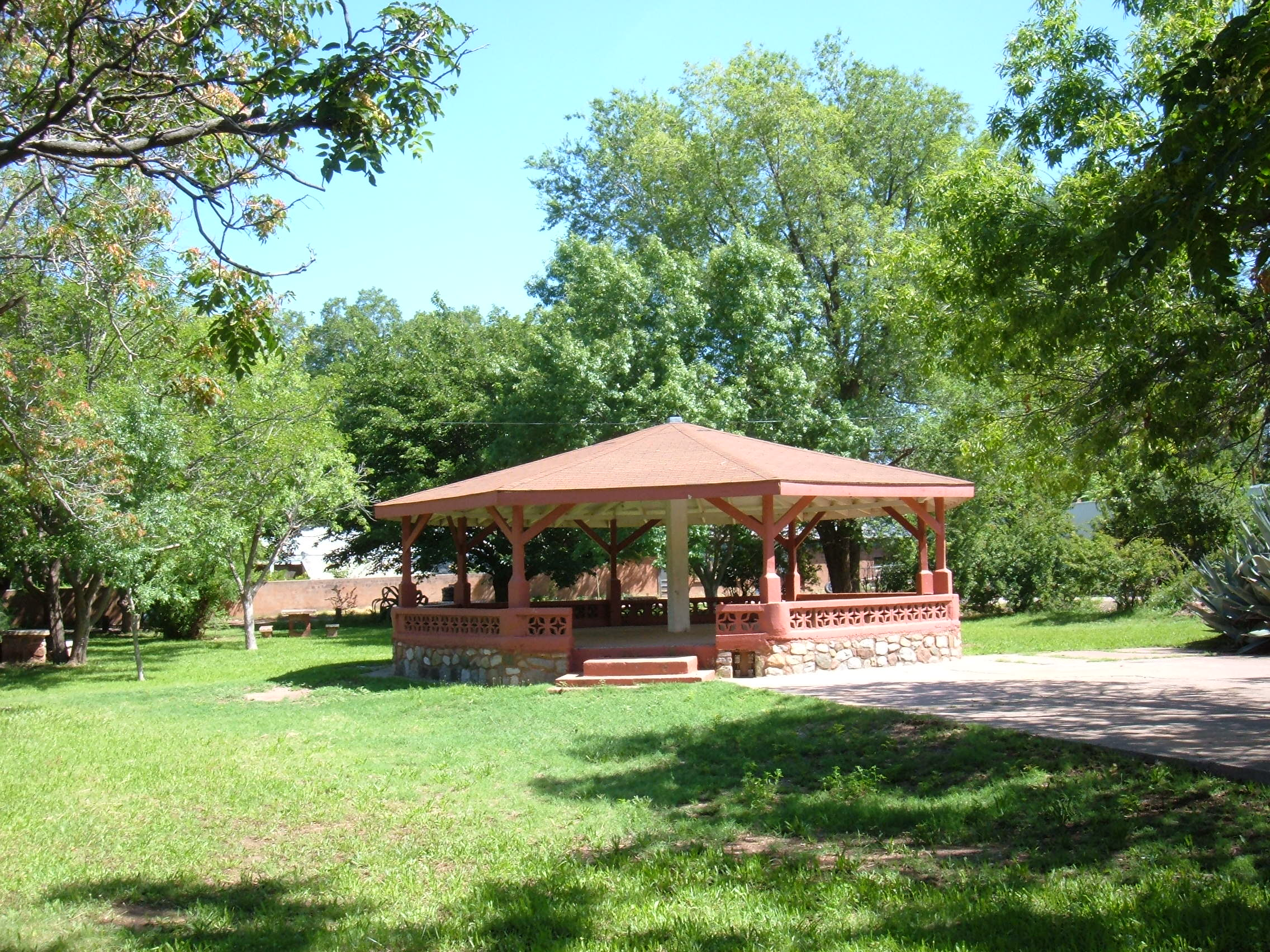

- Location within New Mexico Location within the United States
- Location: Off NM 83, La Luz, New Mexico
- Coordinates: 32°58′42″N 105°56′33″W
- Area: 18 acres (7.3 ha)
- Built: 1860
- Architectural style: Queen Anne, Pueblo, Territorial style
- MPS: La Luz Townsite MRA
- NRHP reference No.: 80002560
- Added to NRHP: October 23, 1980

The La Luz Historic District is a 18 acres (7.3 ha) historic district in La Luz, Otero County, New Mexico, which was listed on the National Register of Historic Places in 1980. The district included 27 contributing buildings.

== Location ==
The historic district is located off [State Road 82]. It includes Queen Anne, Pueblo, and Territorial style architecture.

== History ==
The district includes the Juan Garcia house, an adobe house built around 1870. It also includes the old Nuestra Senora de La Luz Church, which was built in 1896. A replacement church was built in 1958, but the original still stands.

There is a different "La Luz" community of 95 adobe homes built mostly during 1968-72 which has been deemed a cultural property by the state of New Mexico, and which has been asserted to be listed on the National Register. (Note: This other "La Luz" does not seem to be listed on the National Register; it does not appear in National Register of Historic Places listings in Bernalillo County, New Mexico and does not appear in the NRIS database. Part of it does appear to be listed as #539 on New Mexico's list of Cultural Properties, as "La Luz del Oeste, Units 1, 2, and 3", listed 12/9/1977.) The development was designed by Antoine Predock. That community is located within Bernalillo County, within the city of Albuquerque, between North Coors Road and the Rio Grande River.
