= Jackson House (Alamogordo, New Mexico) =

Historic house in New Mexico, United States

- U.S. National Register of Historic Places
- NM State Register of Cultural Properties
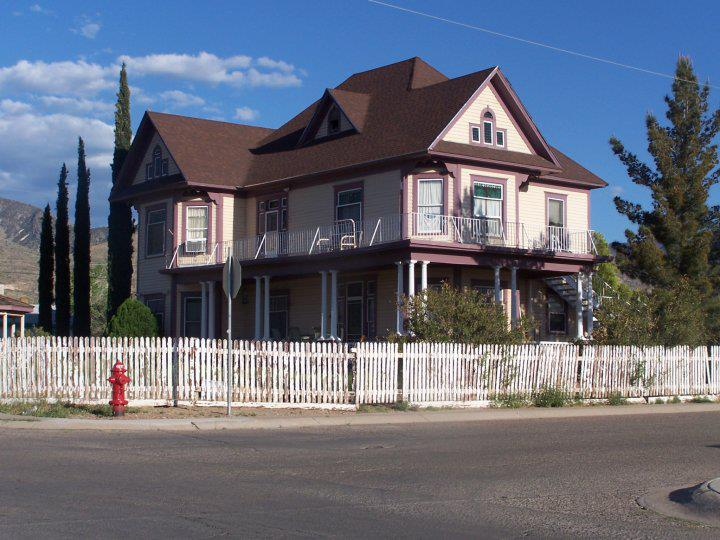

- Location within New Mexico
- Location: 1700 Ninth St., Alamogordo, New Mexico
- Coordinates: 32°53′56″N 105°56′23″W
- Area: less than one acre
- Built: 1903
- Architect: A.P. Jackson
- Architectural style: Queen Anne
- NRHP reference No.: 03001511
- NMSRCP No.: 1860

Significant dates
- Added to NRHP: January 28, 2004
- Designated NMSRCP: December 12, 2003

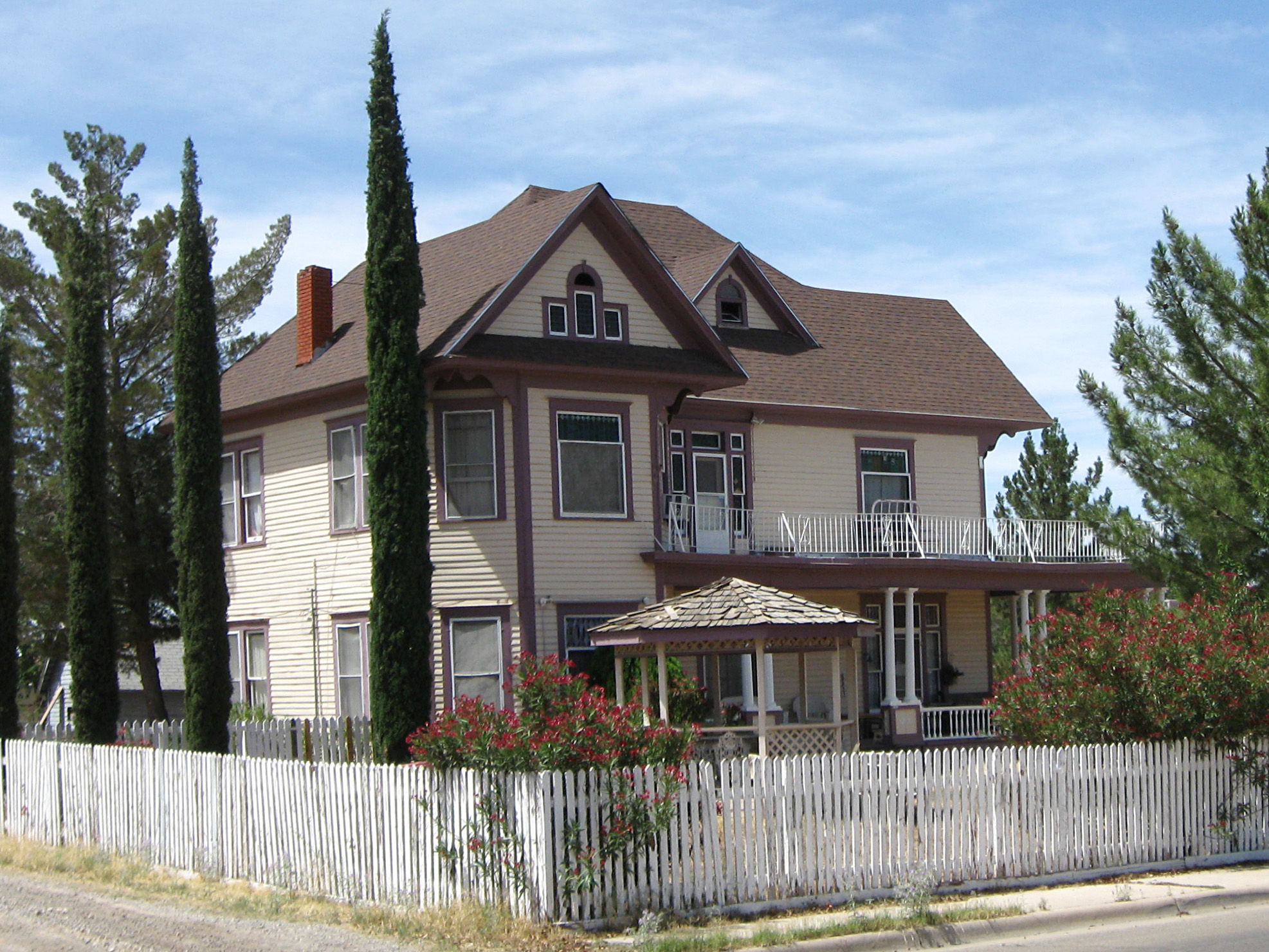

The Jackson House is a historic Queen Anne-style house in the vein of Victorian Architecture. It is located at 1700 Ninth Street in Alamogordo, Otero County, New Mexico. It was built in 1896 by A.P. Jackson. A.P. Jackson was on the commission to select the site for the Institute of the Blind in Alamogordo. Being the President of the Jackson-Galbraith-Foxworth Company, dealers in lumber in Alamogordo. He had been one of the most active business men of the town since its establishment in 1898, and his efforts had been of a practical beneficial nature, far-reaching in their extent, scope and results. He was a native of Texas, having been born in Denton county in 1866. He was reared to farm life and educated in the public schools. In 1892, he became connected with the lumber trade, and from that time until 1898 operated lumber yards in Texas. Upon the founding of the new town of Alamogordo he embarked in business there in June, 1898. He had a stock of lumber shipped to this point and unloaded from the first train entering the town. He was there two months before the railroad was built.

In 1900, he also served as a Director to the First National Bank of Alamogordo.

Most of the frame houses of the town had been erected from lumber furnished by this company. The business is conducted under the name of the Jackson-Galbraith-Foxworth Company, and was incorporated under the laws of New Mexico in January, 1904, with a capital stock of two hundred thousand dollars.

The house was used as a tuberculosis hospice briefly during the 1920s.

In 2004, it was added to the National Register of Historic Places.

== See also ==
- National Register of Historic Places listings in Otero County, New Mexico
