= Weed Lookout Tower =

- U.S. National Register of Historic Places
- Location within New Mexico
- Nearest city: Sacramento, New Mexico
- Coordinates: 32°48′23″N 105°33′33″W
- Area: less than one acre
- Built: 1926
- MPS: National Forest Fire Lookouts in the Southwestern Region TR
- NRHP reference No.: 87002487
- Added to NRHP: January 28, 1988

The Weed Lookout Tower, in Lincoln National Forest in Otero County, New Mexico near Sacramento, New Mexico, was built in 1926. It was listed on the National Register of Historic Places in 1988.

photos only
