= Juan Garcia House =

- U.S. National Register of Historic Places
- Location within New Mexico
- Location: Tularosa St., La Luz, New Mexico
- Coordinates: 32°58′40″N 105°56′31″W
- Area: less than one acre
- Built: c.1870
- MPS: La Luz Townsite MRA
- NRHP reference No.: 80002559
- Added to NRHP: October 23, 1980

The Juan Garcia House, on Tularosa St. in La Luz, New Mexico, was built around 1870. It was listed on the National Register of Historic Places in 1980.

It was the adobe home of Juan Garcia, one of the original settlers of the town of La Luz. La Luz was founded by Mexican-American farmers who moved out of the Rio Grande Valley due to frequent flooding there.
