= Wofford Lookout Complex =

- U.S. National Register of Historic Places
- NM State Register of Cultural Properties
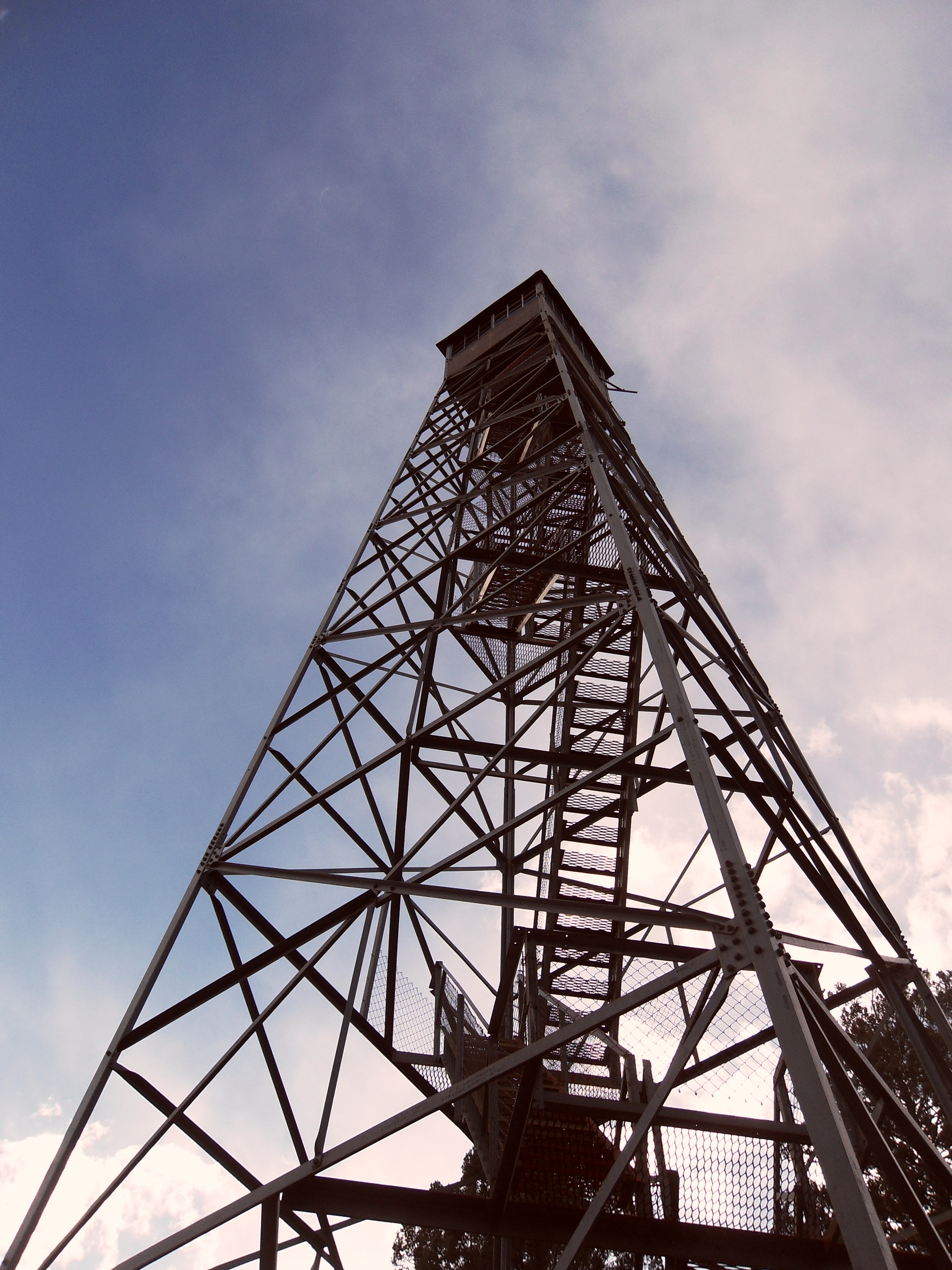
- Wofford Lookout ground view

- Location within New Mexico
- Nearest city: Cloudcroft, New Mexico
- Coordinates: 32°59′48″N 105°42′40″W
- Area: less than one acre
- Built: 1933
- Built by: Civilian Conservation Corps
- Architect: Aermotor Corporation
- Architectural style: Aermotor MC-39 tower
- MPS: National Forest Fire Lookouts in the Southwestern Region TR
- NRHP reference No.: 87002484
- NMSRCP No.: 1446

Significant dates
- Added to NRHP: January 28, 1988
- Designated NMSRCP: March 4, 1988

The Wofford Lookout Complex consists of an 80-foot-tall (24 m) fire lookout tower and associated buildings in Lincoln National Forest in Otero County, New Mexico.

Wofford Lookout Complex was built in 1933 and added to the National Register of Historic Places on January 28, 1988, as part of a thematic group of United States Forest Service fire lookouts in the forest service's Southwestern Region.

== Gallery ==
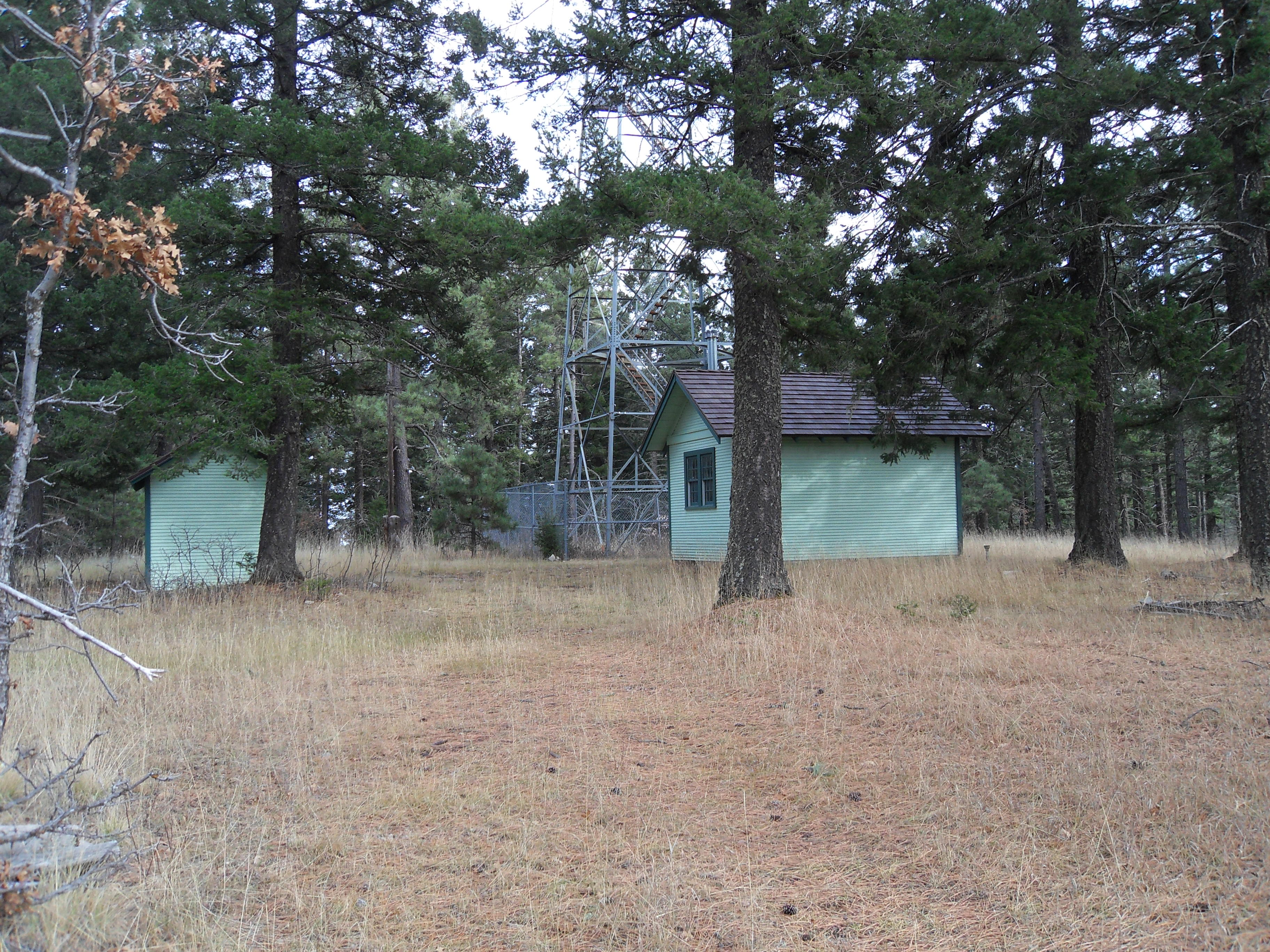
A view of the two support houses and the base of the tower at the Wofford Lookout Complex

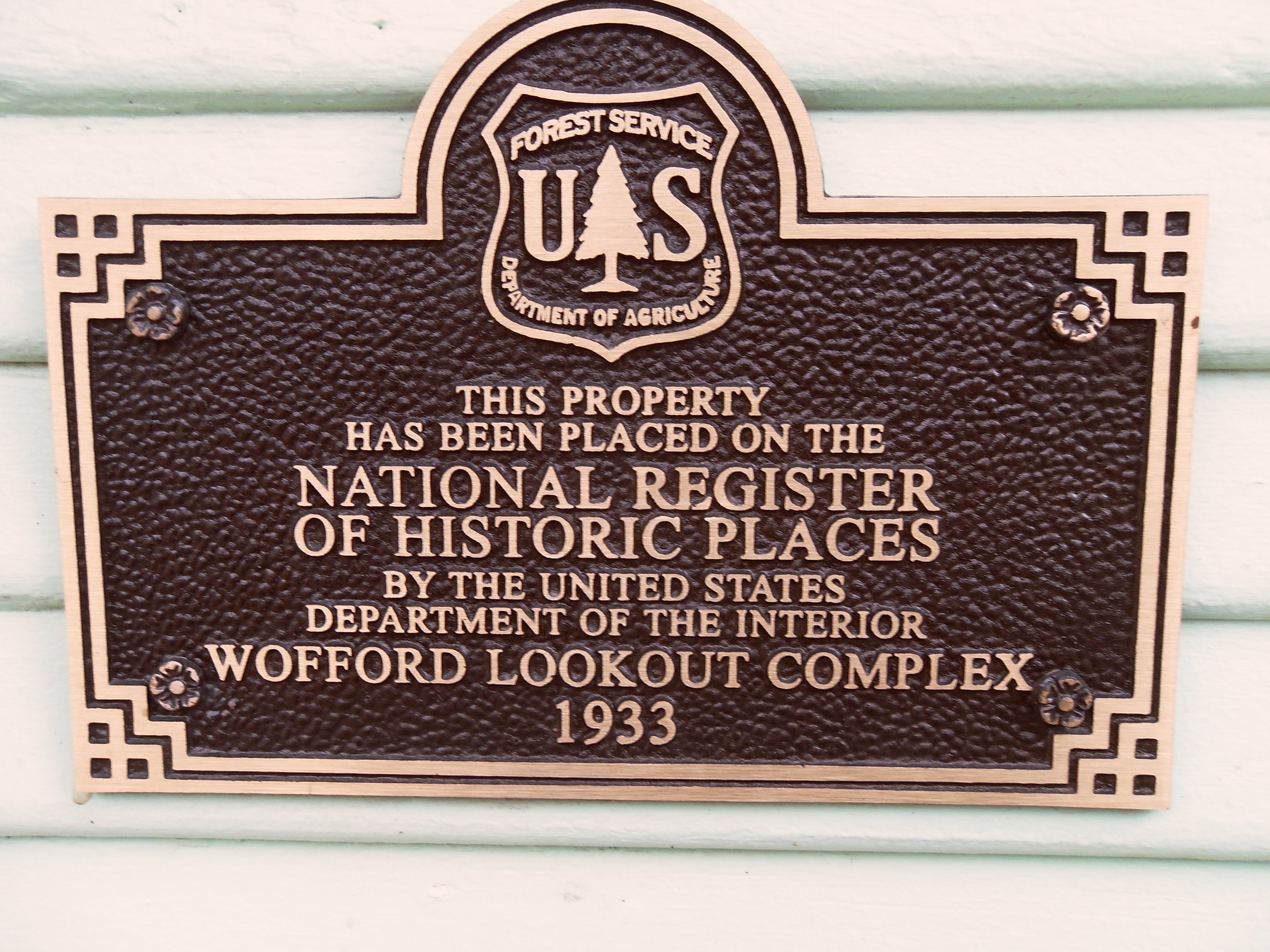
Plaque on the larger of the two support houses

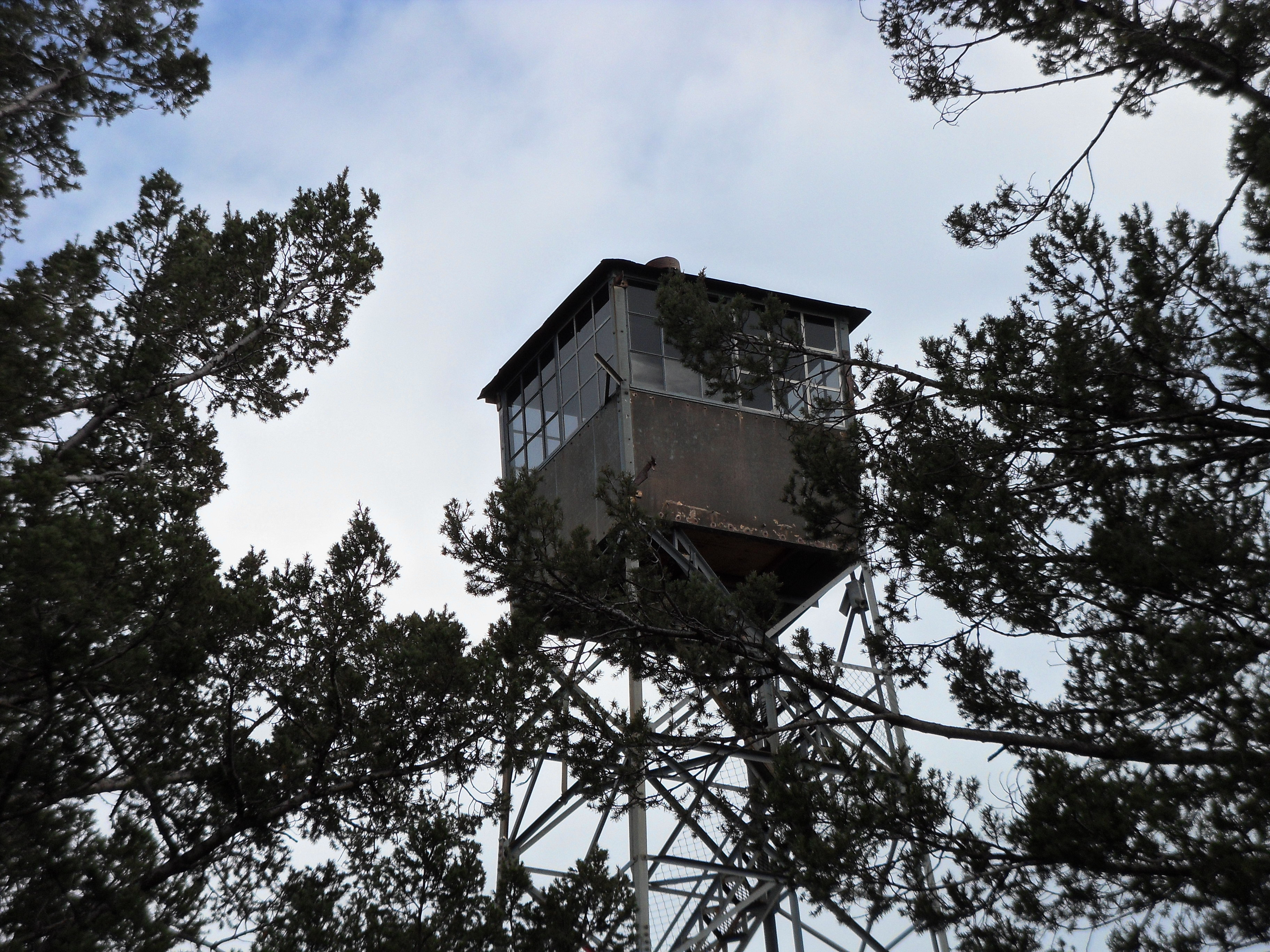
Wofford tower lookout cab

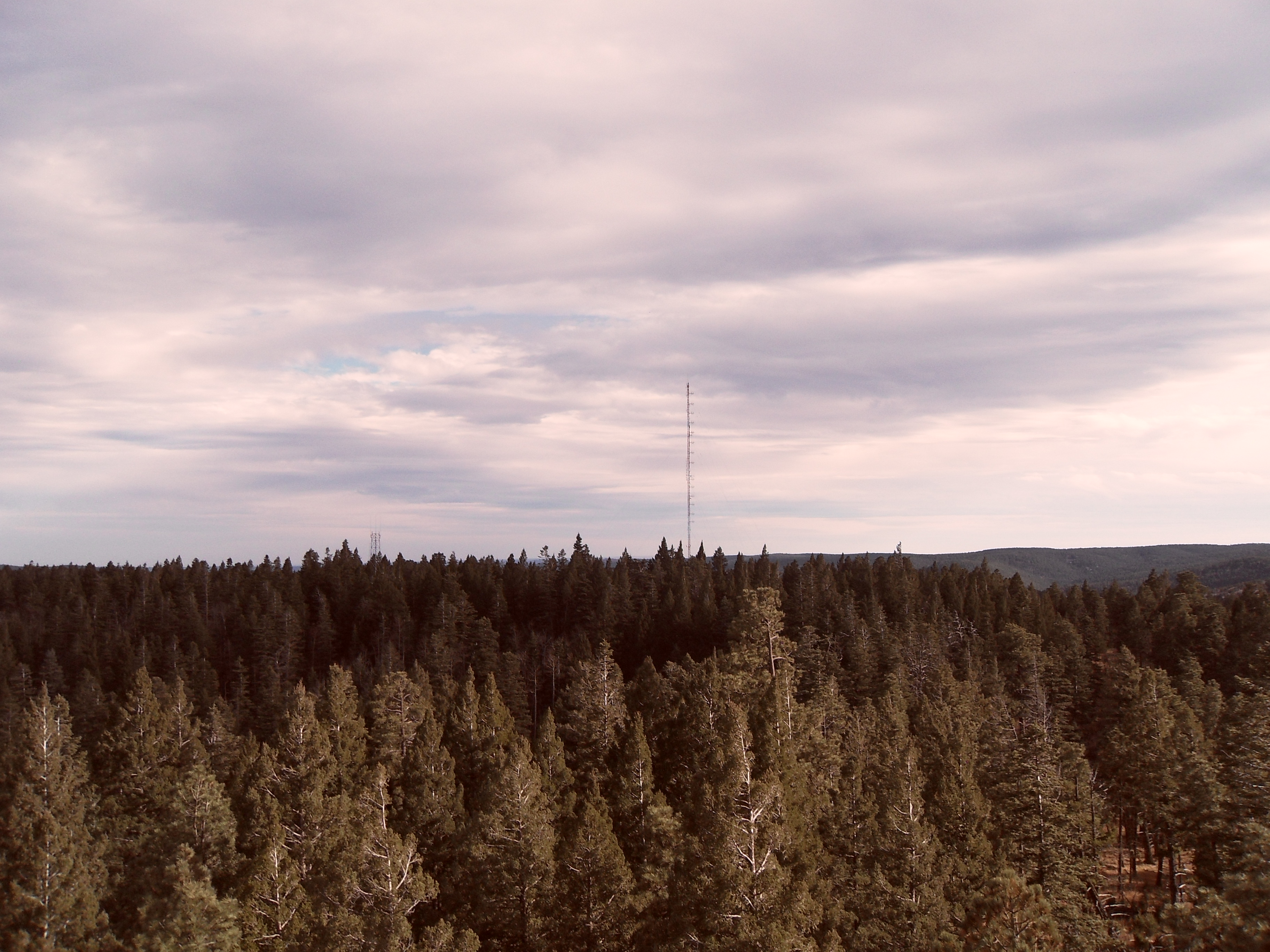
View from the top of Wofford tower

== See also ==
- National Register of Historic Places listings in Otero County, New Mexico
