= KNMZ =

Radio station in Alamogordo, New Mexico

- Alamogordo, New Mexico; United States
- Broadcast area: Alamogordo, New Mexico
- Frequency: 103.7 MHz
- Branding: Stealth Classic Rock

Programming
- Format: Classic rock

Ownership
- Owner: Katlyn and David Grice; (Exciter Media LLC)
- Sister stations: KRSY, KRSY-FM

History
- First air date: March 18, 1996

Technical information
- Licensing authority: FCC
- Facility ID: 14030
- Class: A
- ERP: 6,000 watts
- HAAT: −227.0 meters (−744.8 ft)
- Transmitter coordinates: 32°53′31.6″N 105°56′42″W

Links
- Public license information: Public file; LMS
- Webcast: Listen Live
- Website: stealthclassicrock.com

KNMZ (103.7 FM, "Stealth Classic Rock") is a radio station licensed to serve Alamogordo, New Mexico. The station is owned by Katlyn and David Grice, through licensee Exciter Media LLC. It airs a classic rock format. KNMZ was Alamogordo's ESPN Radio affiliate and also aired a local call-in show, The Roundup, which aired from 2-3 p.m. Monday-Friday. The Roundup was hosted by KNMZ's Charles Winiecki. The station also aired Alamogordo High School football, boys basketball and baseball games, as well as the Arizona Diamondbacks and New Mexico State University football and men's basketball and The NFL featuring the Dallas Cowboys. The station was assigned the KNMZ call letters by the Federal Communications Commission on March 18, 1996, when it originally went on-air.

On December 22, 2021, KNMZ changed its format from sports to classic rock as "Stealth Classic Rock".
