= Queen Anne House (La Luz, New Mexico) =

- U.S. National Register of Historic Places
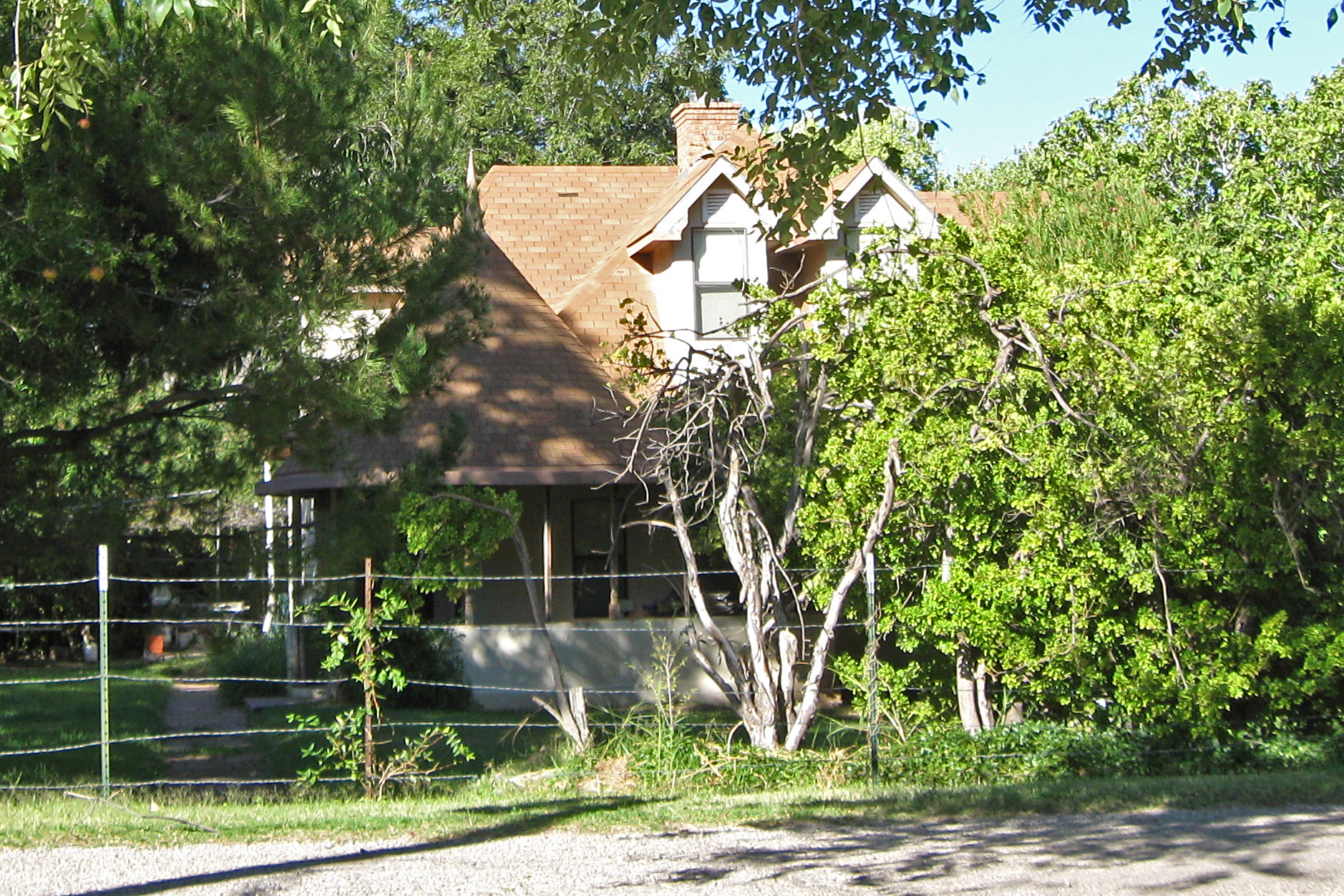

- Location within New Mexico
- Location: Kearny St., La Luz, New Mexico
- Coordinates: 32°58′40″N 105°56′31″W
- Area: less than one acre
- Built: c.1900
- Architectural style: Queen Anne
- MPS: La Luz Townsite MRA
- NRHP reference No.: 80002561
- Added to NRHP: October 23, 1980

The so-called Queen Anne House, on Kearny St. in La Luz, New Mexico, was built around 1900. It was listed on the National Register of Historic Places in 1980.

It is an example of Queen Anne style, which would have required manufactured parts from far away.

The "La Luz Townsite Multiple Resource Area" study states that this house, "dating to around 1900, is the only structure [in La Luz] which has architectural significance in its own right. The style is generally found in towns affected by the major railroads, i.e. the Santa Fe and Southern Pacific. It is, therefore, unusual to find a rather nice example in a place such as La Luz."

From a 1979 photo, it appears to be a Queen Anne or vernacular Queen Anne cottage, and is perhaps one-and-a-half-stories tall. One element of Queen Anne style is its conical roof on a section of its porch.
