= D.H. Sutherland House =

- D. H. Sutherland House
- U.S. National Register of Historic Places
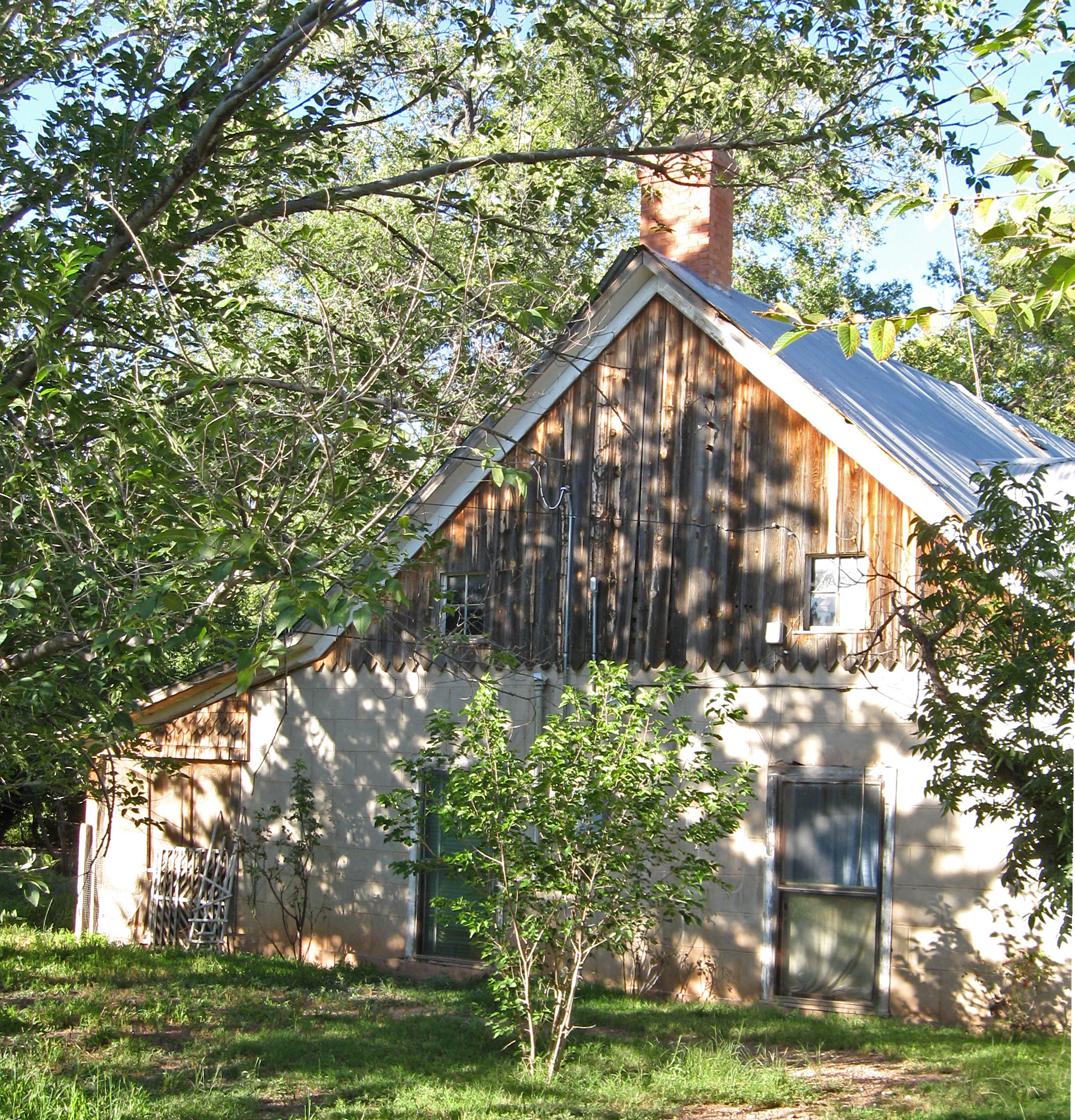

- Location within New Mexico
- Location: Main St., La Luz, New Mexico
- Coordinates: 32°58′40″N 105°56′31″W
- Area: 1 acre (0.40 ha)
- Built: c.1870, 1890
- Built by: Ramirez, Mariano
- Architectural style: Territorial style
- MPS: La Luz Townsite MRA
- NRHP reference No.: 80002562
- Added to NRHP: October 23, 1980

The D. H. Sutherland House, on Main St. in La Luz, New Mexico, was listed on the National Register of Historic Places in 1980. It was built around 1870 by Mariano Ramirez as a three-room, flat-roof, adobe house with small, high windows for "protection from enemies". The house was modified by Dave H. Sutherland after he bought it in 1890, adding a gable roof, a south-facing screened porch, and a number of rooms, and reflecting Victorian influences.

The house's interior is "quite traditional, with wood floors, high ceilings, and corner fireplaces. D. H. Sutherland was one of La Luz's more substantial landholders, as in 1898 he owned several large parcels and the water rights to them."

The house hosted A. J. Fountain, an attorney, for the night before his journey back to Las Cruces. He was murdered along with his son at Chalk Hill close to the Organ Pass. Fountain was involved in a La Luz water rights lawsuit and other legal conflicts. It is speculated that he and his son were murdered by a member of Oliver Lee's gang.
