= New Mexico School for the Blind and Visually Impaired =

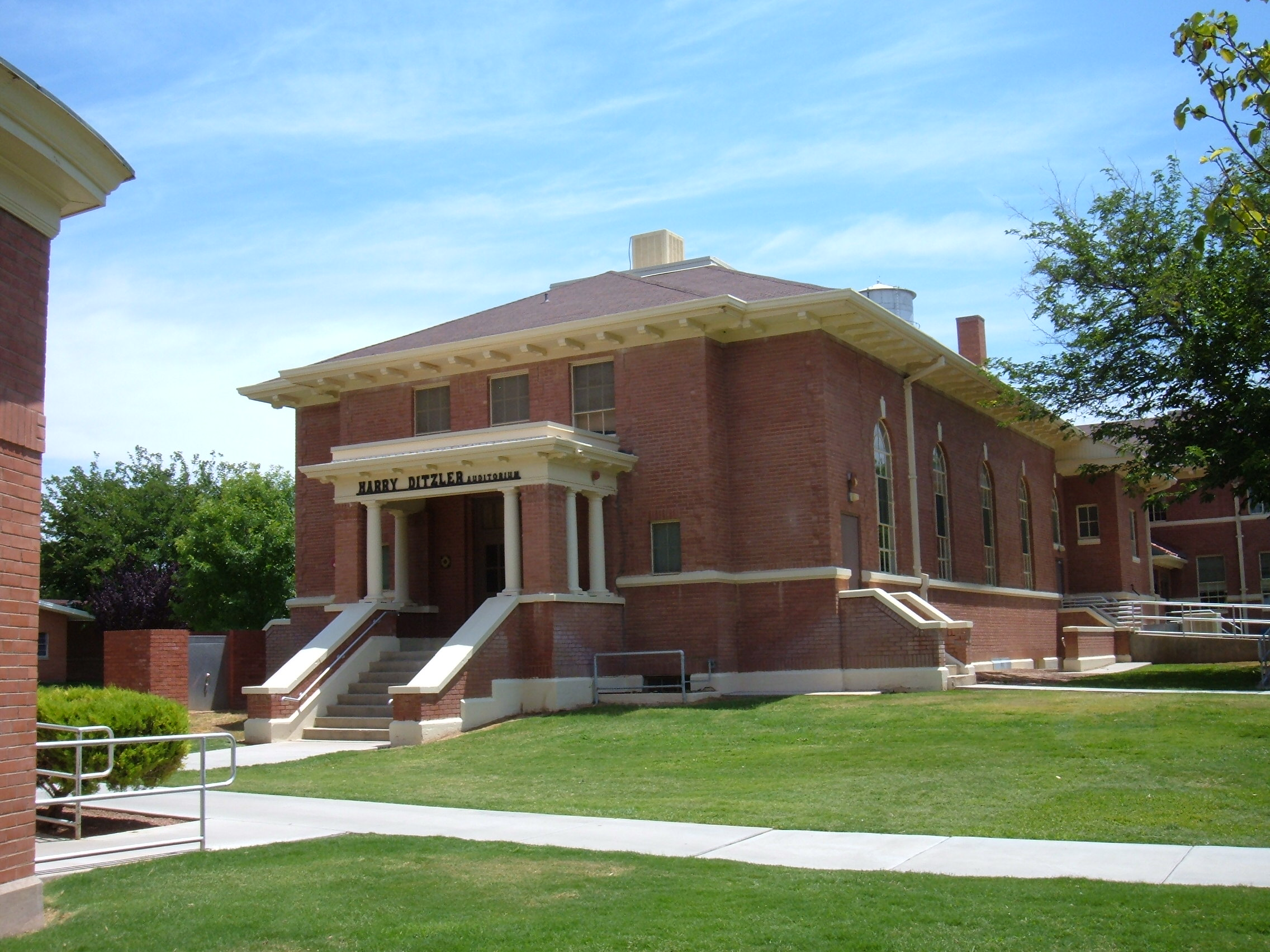
- Harry Ditzler Auditorium on the Alamogordo campus

Location
- 1900 N. White Sands Blvd. Alamogordo, New Mexico 88310; United States; 32.91321°N 105.95882°W

Information
- Established: 1903
- Superintendent: Dr. Heather Miller
- Team name: Golden Bears
- Accreditation: NCA CASI
- Website: http://www.nmsbvi.k12.nm.us

The New Mexico School for the Blind and Visually Impaired (Braille: ⠝⠍⠎⠃⠧⠊, Spanish: Escuela para Ciegos y Discapacitados Visuales de Nuevo México) is a state special education school with a residential campus in Alamogordo, New Mexico and a preschool in Albuquerque, New Mexico. It operates outreach programs throughout the state.

The school has operated under several names: New Mexico Institute for the Blind (1903–1925), New Mexico School for the Blind (1925–1954), New Mexico School for the Visually Handicapped (1954–2004), and New Mexico School for the Blind and Visually Impaired (2004–present).

== History ==
Education for the blind started in New Mexico in the 1893–1894 school year at the state Asylum for the Deaf and Dumb (the present-day New Mexico School for the Deaf). The school had difficulty attracting blind students, and William Ashton Hawkins, a member of the territorial legislature from Alamogordo, introduced and succeeding in 1903 in securing passage of a bill to create the New Mexico Institute for the Blind, to be located in Alamogordo. The city of Alamogordo and the county of Otero donated 20 acres (81,000 m^{2}) of land for the school, and the land was cleared and construction begun. The Institute first opened its doors in September 1906 with a class of 21 students.

In 1949 the New Mexico Legislature passed a bill for a $300,000 bond to build a residence for the superintendent and an administration building.

A preschool program was started in 1975, initially in Santa Fe and Albuquerque, but the Santa Fe program was soon discontinued and the Albuquerque program continues today.

The school was renamed the New Mexico School for the Blind in 1925, the New Mexico School for the Visually Handicapped in 1954, and the New Mexico School for the Blind and Visually Impaired in 2004.

Elizabeth Garrett, composer of New Mexico's state song "O Fair New Mexico" and daughter of Sheriff Pat Garrett, was blind and was a teacher at the school from 1907 to 1915. She composed the school song. She was vice-president of the school's Board of Regents in 1931 and 1932. The girls' dormitory, built in 1963, is named after her.

== Organization ==
Organizationally the state's "special schools", including NMSBVI, are placed within the New Mexico Higher Education Department.

The school is a land grant institution, with nearly 90% of its operating costs paid by income from lands held in trust for it by the New Mexico State Land Office. The land was granted to New Mexico by the Federal Government through the New Mexico Organic Act of 1850, the Ferguson Act of 1898, and the 1912 Enabling Act. The State of New Mexico pays the tuition and most living and educational expenses of students who are New Mexico residents.

== Campuses ==
The school serves about 800 students throughout New Mexico, through the Alamogordo campus, the pre-school, and the outreach programs.

=== Alamogordo campus ===
The main campus is located at 1900 North White Sands Boulevard in Alamogordo, New Mexico. Most of the old buildings on the main campus have been razed since World War II. The oldest surviving building is the original Teachers' Cottage, built in 1918, and renamed the Paul and Lois Tapia Building in 2006. Four of the campus buildings are listed in the National Register of Historic Places: the Administration Building (now the Paul and Lois Tapia Building), the Auditorium and Recreation Building (Harry Ditzler Auditorium), the Central Receiving Building, and the Infirmary Building.

=== Albuquerque campus ===
A satellite campus that houses the Early Childhood Program and the outreach programs is at 801 Stephen Moody Street SE in Albuquerque, New Mexico. The campus had been located at 230 Truman NE for many years, and groundbreaking for this new campus occurred on December 17, 2007. The ribbon-cutting for the new campus was held January 15, 2009.

== Curriculum ==
The Alamogordo campus serves grades K–12. It is a residential campus, with students whose home is outside Otero County living on-campus. Those who live in the county are day students, and the school provides transportation to and from their homes each school day. Residential students go home each weekend in a bus or airplane provided by the school.

NMSBVI is accredited by the North Central Association Commission on Accreditation and School Improvement.

With the passage of the mainstreaming law (P.L. 94–142, the Education for All Handicapped Children Act of 1975), the school sent some students to public school classes as well as their classes at NMSBVI, and started making equipment, materials, and staff available to all New Mexico schools. Today students in the academic track attend most classes in the local school system (Alamogordo Public Schools).

In addition to the academic curriculum, students take an "expanded core curriculum" that includes additional skills needed by the visually impaired, such as social interaction skills, career education, technology, independent living, and independent travel.

NMSBVI uses assistive technology. It was one of the first public schools of any type to make widespread use of the Internet, and by 1996 it had a campus network of more than 100 microcomputers.

The school sport teams, the Golden Bears, compete in the South Central Association of Schools for the Blind, and NMSBVI is a member school of the New Mexico Activities Association.
