= Tularosa Original Townsite District =

Historic district in New Mexico, United States

- U.S. National Register of Historic Places
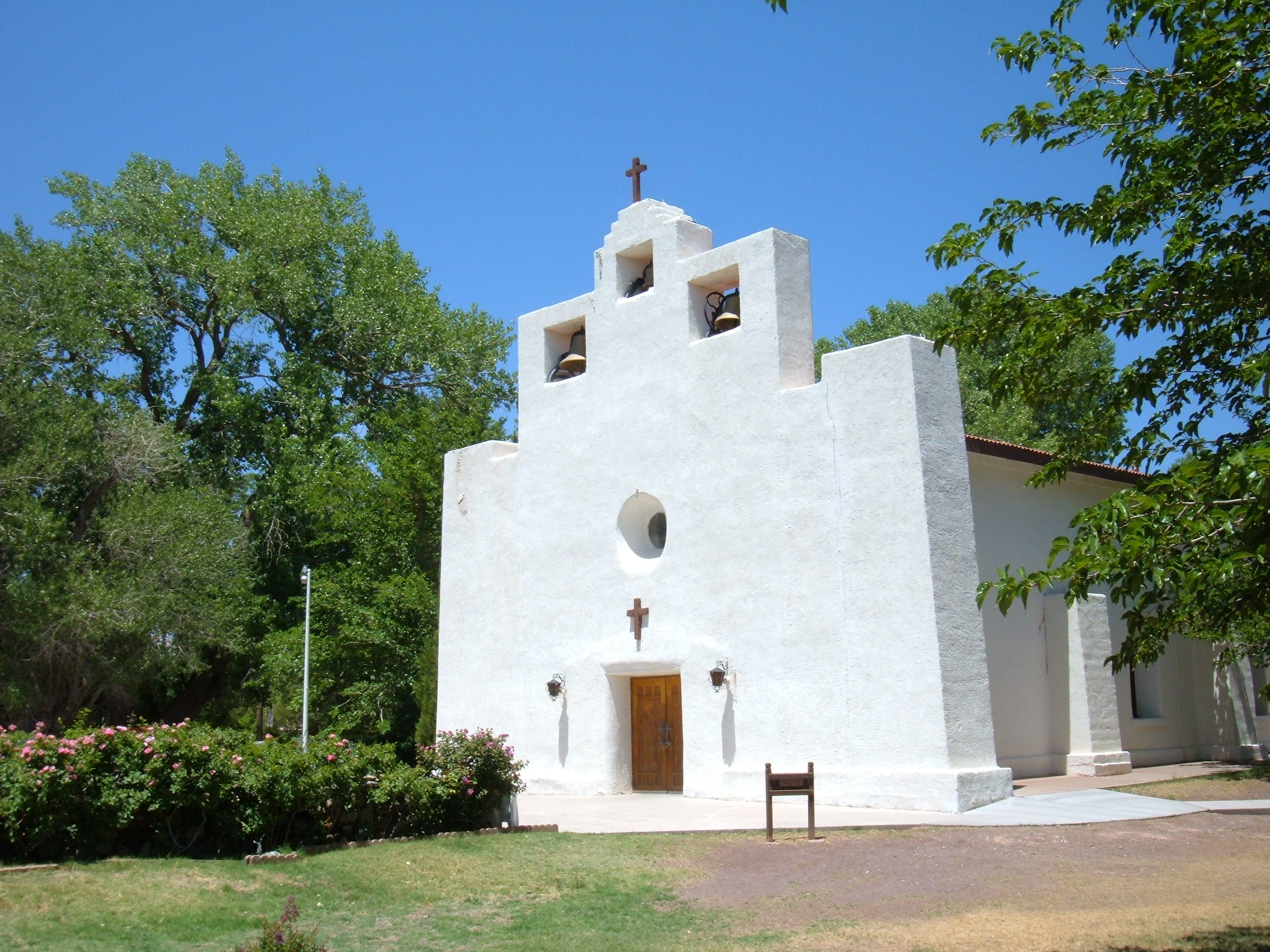

- Location within New Mexico
- Location: U.S. 54/70, Tularosa, New Mexico
- Coordinates: 33°04′28″N 106°01′01″W
- Area: 140 acres (57 ha)
- Built: 1862
- Architectural style: Pueblo, California Bungalow
- NRHP reference No.: 79001545
- Added to NRHP: February 2, 1979

The Tularosa Original Townsite District in Tularosa, New Mexico is a 140 acres (57 ha) historic district which was listed on the National Register of Historic Places in 1979. The district included 182 contributing buildings.

Tularosa was founded in 1862.

Architecture: Pueblo, California Bungalow Historic function: Domestic Historic subfunction: Single Dwelling Criteria: architecture/engineering

It is located near the intersection of U.S. Route 54 (New Mexico) and U.S. Route 70 in New Mexico?
