= Administration Building (Alamogordo, New Mexico) =

- U.S. National Register of Historic Places
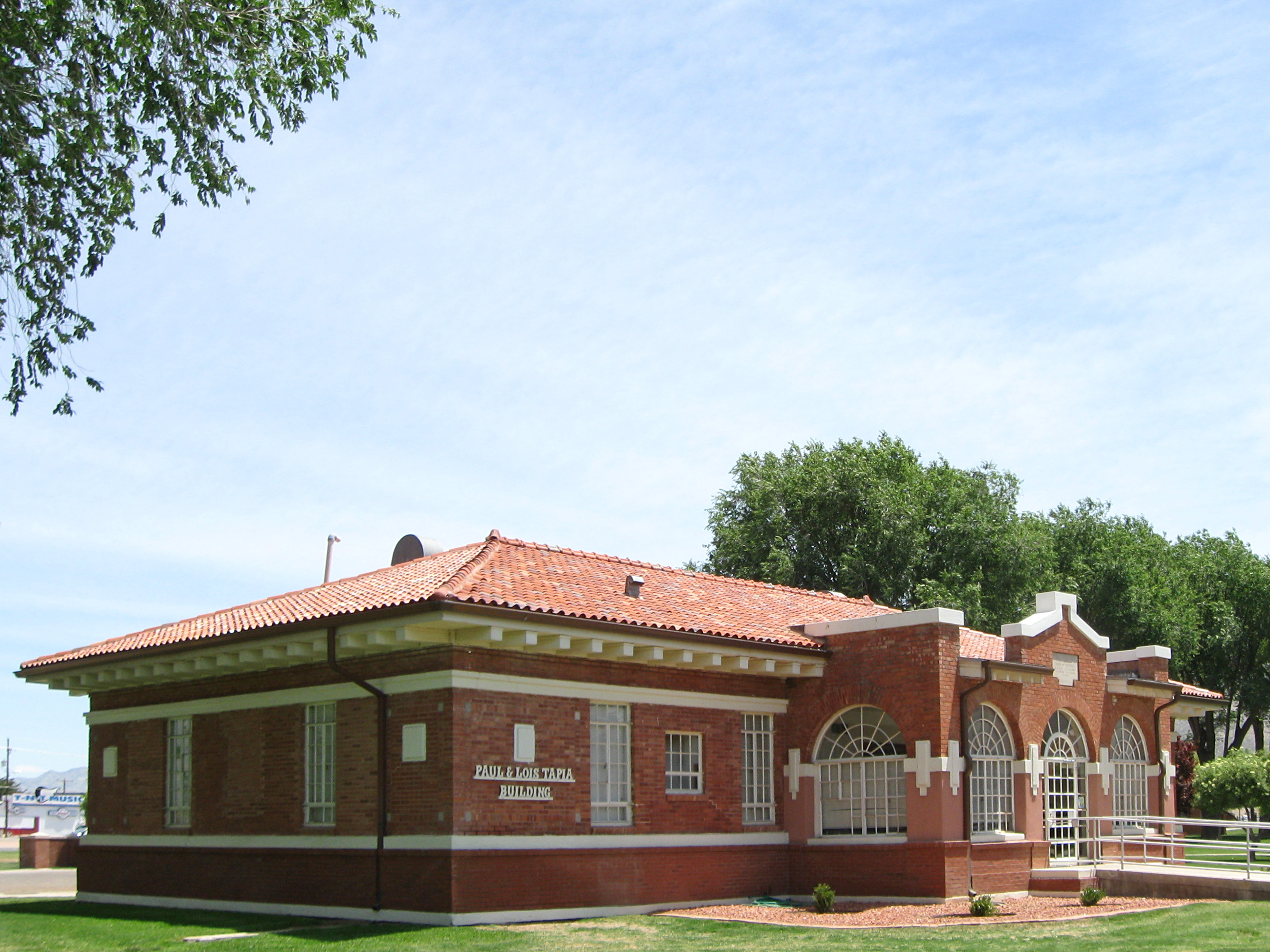

- Location within New Mexico
- Location: 1900 N. White Sands Blvd., NMSVH, Alamogordo, New Mexico
- Coordinates: 32°54′51″N 105°57′33″W
- Area: 0.1 acres (0.040 ha)
- Built: 1918
- Architect: Trost & Trost
- Architectural style: Late 19th and 20th Century Revivals, Mediterranean
- MPS: New Mexico Campus Buildings Built 1906--1937 TR
- NRHP reference No.: 88001564
- Added to NRHP: May 16, 1989

The Administration Building in Alamogordo, New Mexico, located at 1900 N White Sands Boulevard, is a building of the New Mexico School for the Blind and Visually Impaired. It was built in 1918 and was listed on the National Register of Historic Places in 1989.

It was designed by architects Trost & Trost. According to its 1988 National Register nomination:

The Administration Building is a one-story brick mediterranean style building with a hipped roof of French tile and soffitted wood overhang decorated with built-up dentil course. Windows are metal casement with a concrete sill and lintel that forms a continuous banding around the building. Entry has flat roof with concrete coping over metal casement windows with fan lites and 24 lite metal door. Each brick arch over windows share concrete springer bases. The building was renovated in 1941 and 1980. The windows may have been changed in 1941 remodel. There is a brick soldier course added to form a wainscot from grade to just below window sills in 1980 remodel. A handicapped ramp has been added at the entrance. The building has a rectangular shape. This building was designed by the architectural firm of Trost and Trost in 1918. It was originally a hospital and teacher's cottage that was changed to administration in the mid 1960s.

The Administration Building is one of four buildings constructed on the campus of the New Mexico School of the Visually Handicapped between 1918 and 1935, and the only building remaining from the period built in the Mediterranean Style. The Administration building is significant because it is the only building of five remaining from the period 1912 to 1919 designed by the architectural firm of Trost and Trost. It is a good example of the style that Trost and Trost had set for the campus during this period. Since the Mediterranean and Decorative Brick Styles are similar, the Administration Building fits in with the other buildings on campus. The overall impression of the campus is one of having a uniform style with individual variations among the buildings.

When listed in 1988 it was owned by the Regents of the New Mexico School for the Visually Handicapped (NMSVH).
