= KRSY (AM) =

Radio station in Alamogordo, New Mexico

- Alamogordo, New Mexico; United States
- Frequency: 1230 kHz
- Branding: Alamo Sports and Talk

Programming
- Format: Talk/Sports
- Affiliations: Citadel Media, ESPN Radio, Premiere Radio Networks

Ownership
- Owner: Katlyn and David Grice; (Exciter Media LLC)
- Sister stations: KNMZ, KRSY-FM

History
- Former call signs: KALG (1950s-1977), KPSA (1977–1999)

Technical information
- Licensing authority: FCC
- Facility ID: 14029
- Class: C
- Power: 1,000 watts unlimited
- Transmitter coordinates: 32°53′46″N 105°56′42″W
- Translator: 101.9 K270CS (Alamogordo)

Links
- Public license information: Public file; LMS
- Webcast: Listen Live
- Website: alamosportsandtalk.com

KRSY (1230 kHz, "Alamo Sports and Talk") is an AM radio station broadcasting a talk/sports format. Licensed to Alamogordo, New Mexico, United States, the station is currently owned by Katlyn and David Grice, through licensee Exciter Media LLC, and features programming from Citadel Media, ESPN Radio and Premiere Radio Networks.
