= Sacramento, New Mexico =

Sacramento
- Census-designated place
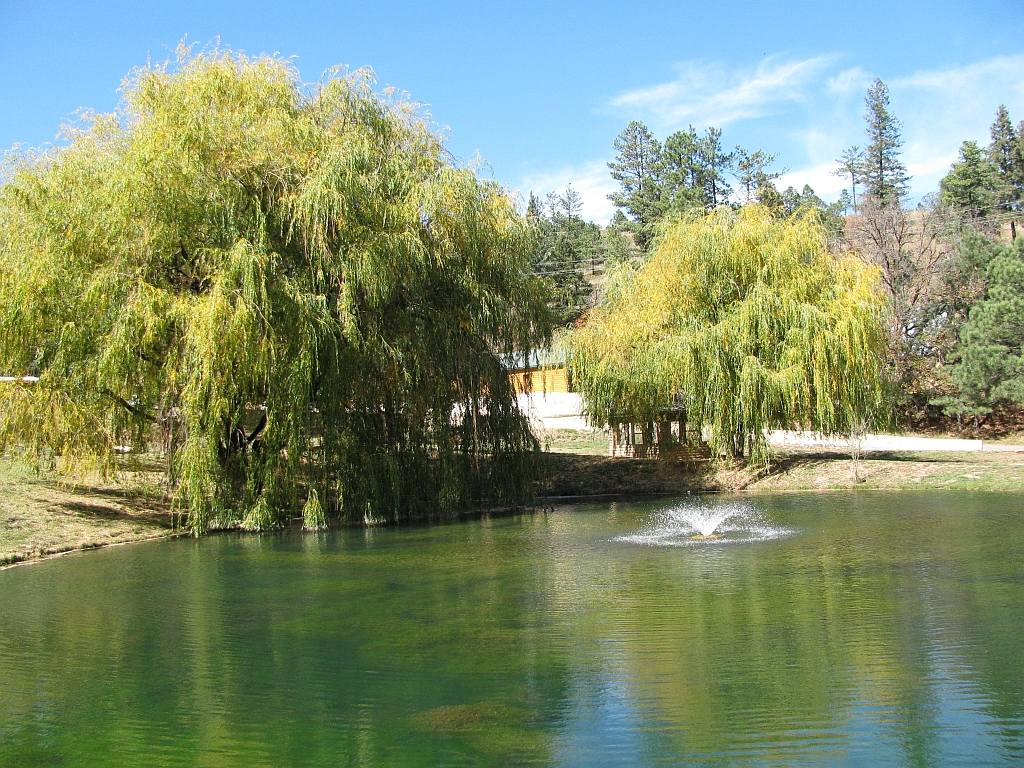

- Location within New Mexico
- Coordinates: 32°47′30″N 105°34′20″W
- Country: United States
- State: New Mexico
- County: Otero

Area
  - Total: 6.55 sq mi (16.96 km^{2})
  - Land: 6.55 sq mi (16.96 km^{2})
  - Water: 0 sq mi (0.00 km^{2})
- Elevation: 7,425 ft (2,263 m)

Population (2020)
  - Total: 53
  - Density: 8.1/sq mi (3.13/km^{2})
- Time zone: UTC-7 (Mountain (MST))
  - Summer (DST): UTC-6 (MDT)
- ZIP code: 88347
- Area code: 575
- GNIS feature ID: 2584197

Sacramento is a census-designated place in Otero County, New Mexico, United States. As of the 2020 census, Sacramento had a population of 53. Sacramento has a post office with ZIP code 88347. New Mexico State Road 521 passes through the community.

== Demographics ==
Historical population
Census	Pop.	Note	%±
2020	53		—
U.S. Decennial Census

== Economy ==
The last gas station in Sacramento closed in the 1980s.

== Education ==
It is in Cloudcroft Municipal Schools.
