= La Luz, New Mexico =

- CDP
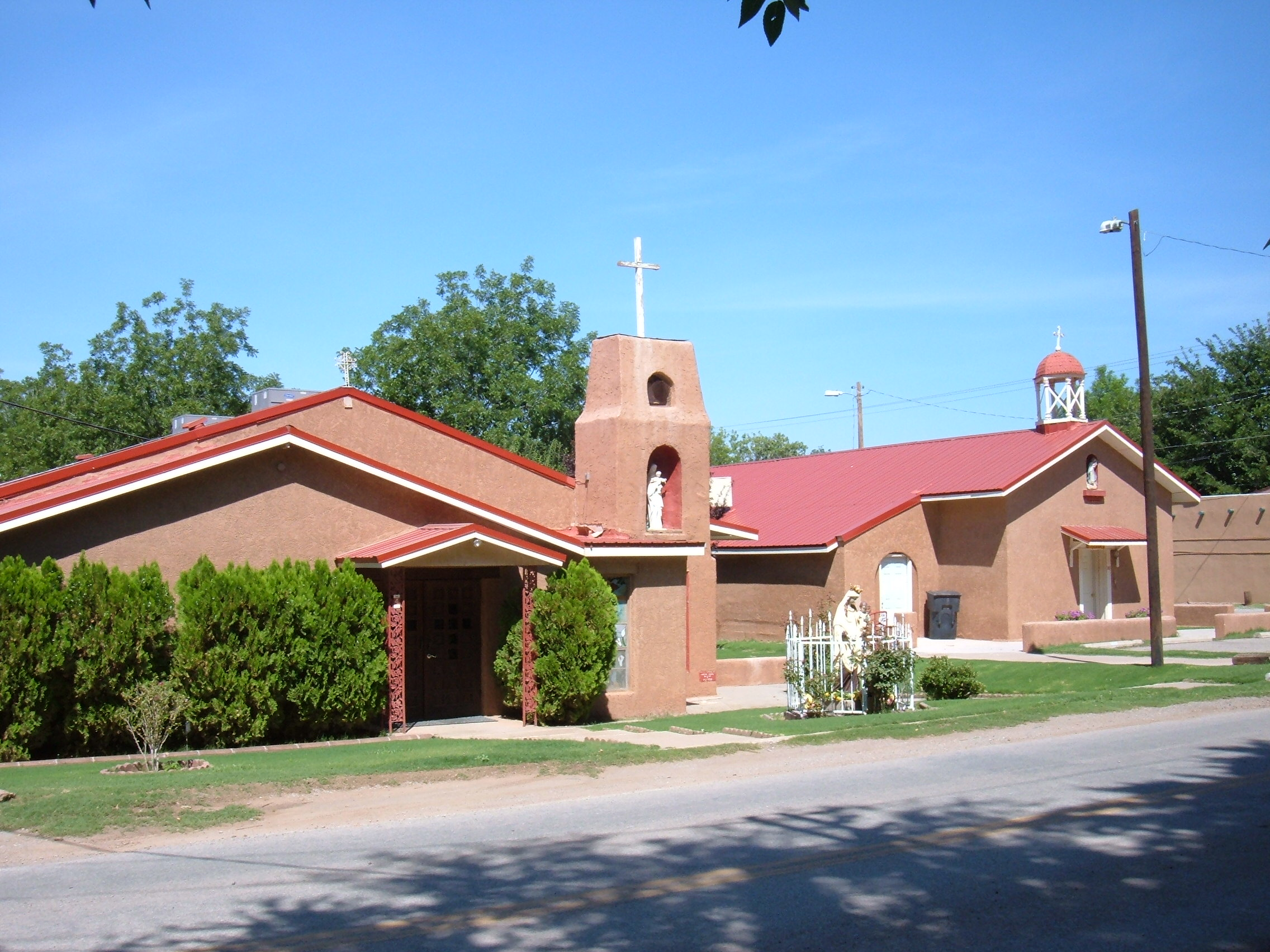
- Our Lady of the Light Church

- Location of La Luz, New Mexico

- Location in the United States
- Coordinates: 32°58′11″N 105°56′20″W
- Country: United States
- State: New Mexico
- County: Otero

Area
  - Total: 10.71 sq mi (27.74 km^{2})
  - Land: 10.68 sq mi (27.67 km^{2})
  - Water: 0.027 sq mi (0.07 km^{2})
- Elevation: 4,721 ft (1,439 m)

Population (2020)
  - Total: 1,578
  - Density: 147.7/sq mi (57.02/km^{2})
- Time zone: UTC-7 (Mountain (MST))
  - Summer (DST): UTC-6 (MDT)
- ZIP code: 88337
- Area code: Area code 575
- FIPS code: 35-38330
- GNIS feature ID: 2408506

La Luz is a census-designated place (CDP) in Otero County, New Mexico, United States. As of the 2020 census, La Luz had a population of 1,578. It is located immediately north of Alamogordo and lies in the eastern edge of the Tularosa Basin and on the western flank of the Sacramento Mountains. Until 1848, La Luz was a part of Mexico. The CDP gets its name from the Spanish word for "light".

== Geography ==
According to the United States Census Bureau, the CDP has a total area of 10.7 square miles (28 km^{2}), all land.

La Luz sits at the opening of La Luz Canyon Creek, whose headwaters are high in the Sacramento Mountains. The waters of La Luz and Fresnal creeks are used by both the much larger city of Alamogordo, just to the south of La Luz and by La Luz in a ditch or acequia system. The City of Alamogordo has constructed a large reservoir to the south of La Luz to impound these waters.

== History ==
Native Americans lived in the area for thousands of years prior to the arrival of the Spanish in the late 16th Century. The Mescalero Apache homelands covered an area of south-central New Mexico including the Sacramento Mountains and the Tularosa Basin. Today, the ancestral homelands of the Apache have been reduced to those lands contained in the Mescalero Apache Reservation, approximately 30 miles northeast of La Luz. There is some dispute over the founding of La Luz. By some accounts, it was founded by Franciscan friars as early as the 18th Century and called Nuestra Señora De La Luz (Our Lady of the Light). Early maps of the area include this notation and La Luz Canyon may have served as an early pass over the Sacramento Mountains connecting with the Peñasco river, which eventually flows into the Pecos River near present-day Artesia, New Mexico. The Sacramento Mountains reach a height of 9,000 feet.

It is well documented that a large group of Hispanic settlers came to the area around 1864 leaving villages along the Rio Grande in the vicinity of present-day Socorro, New Mexico, after devastating floods had occurred. These settlers founded the Village of Tularosa along the banks of Tularosa Creek and established a large acequia system and agricultural area.

Anglo settlers arrived in increasing numbers in the area especially after the Civil War with some establishing large ranches in the Tularosa Basin and nearby areas to supply beef to nearby Fort Stanton. Increasing rivalries between various competing factions would result in the Lincoln County War. The arrival of the railroad in the area brought rapid change to the area. The railroad reached El Paso, ninety miles to the south, in 1882. Charles B. Eddy and partners constructed a branch line from El Paso northward to exploit the timber resources of the Sacramento Mountains and coal deposits further north near present-day White Oaks, New Mexico. The establishment of the railroad resulted in the founding of Alamogordo in 1898 just a few miles south of La Luz. Eddy then constructed a branch into the Sacramento Mountains that went through La Luz and climbed to approximately 9,000 feet within the span of a few miles. Often referred to as the "Cloud Climbing Railroad" it was an engineering marvel. The mountain section of the railroad was dismantled in the early 1940s. The Village of Cloudcroft was established in the Sacramento Mountains and offered residents of El Paso an escape from the heat during the summer. Eddy's partner and lawyer for the railroad, William Ashton Hawkins, established a farm and large home which still stands in La Luz.

In the early Twentieth Century, Rowland Hazard III (1882–1945), the heir of an industrial fortune from Rhode Island, came to the area and established a large ranch and farm in the canyon areas above La Luz. He had the Coronado Lodge constructed as a hunting lodge in Cottonwood Canyon out of native stone in the early 1920s. Hazzard also established the La Luz Pottery Works after discovery of rich clay deposits in La Luz Canyon. The pottery works were well known for the manufacture of clay roof tiles and other architectural components such as chimney pots as well as extremely large pottery vessels. The pottery works supplied contractors nationwide at a time when the Spanish Colonial Revival architectural style was at its height. Both the Coronado Lodge and the pottery works remain as fine examples of this type of architecture.

== Economy ==
The largest employer in the surrounding area is Holloman Air Force Base. La Luz itself is largely residential and agricultural in land use but a small market is located on the state maintained road that connects the village to Highway 70. La Luz has long been known for the many fruits that are grown in the area including figs, apricots, plums and peaches. Apples, cherries, and pears are grown in the higher elevations in the canyon areas to the east of the village. The surrounding area also has a number of vineyards and pistachio groves. A number of artists also reside in the area.

== Demographics ==
Historical population
Census	Pop.	Note	%±
2020	1,578		—
U.S. Decennial Census

As of the census of 2000, there were 1,615 people, 648 households, and 463 families residing in the CDP. The population density was 150.7 inhabitants per square mile (58.2/km^{2}). There were 738 housing units at an average density of 68.9 per square mile (26.6/km^{2}). The racial makeup of the CDP was 84.71% White, 0.43% African American, 1.24% Native American, 0.56% Asian, 10.40% from other races, and 2.66% from two or more races. Hispanic or Latino of any race were 31.70% of the population.

There were 648 households, out of which 31.0% had children under the age of 18 living with them, 54.9% were married couples living together, 12.5% had a female householder with no husband present, and 28.5% were non-families. 23.3% of all households were made up of individuals, and 10.0% had someone living alone who was 65 years of age or older. The average household size was 2.49 and the average family size was 2.95.

In the CDP, the population was spread out, with 26.6% under the age of 18, 6.8% from 18 to 24, 26.6% from 25 to 44, 24.9% from 45 to 64, and 15.0% who were 65 years of age or older. The median age was 39 years. For every 100 females, there were 93.9 males. For every 100 females age 18 and over, there were 91.4 males.

The median income for a household in the CDP was $28,625, and the median income for a family was $29,719. Males had a median income of $30,213 versus $21,563 for females. The per capita income for the CDP was $15,258. About 10.9% of families and 13.8% of the population were below the poverty line, including 30.2% of those under age 18 and 9.3% of those age 65 or over.

== Education ==
It is zoned to Alamogordo Public Schools. La Luz Elementary School is the zoned elementary school of the area, while Chaparral Middle School is the zoned middle school. Alamogordo High School is the district's comprehensive high school.

La Luz School District consolidated into the Alamogordo district on July 1, 1959.

== See also ==
- List of census-designated places in New Mexico
