= Seven Cabins Fire =

2026 New Mexico wildfire

- Part of the 2026 New Mexico wildfires
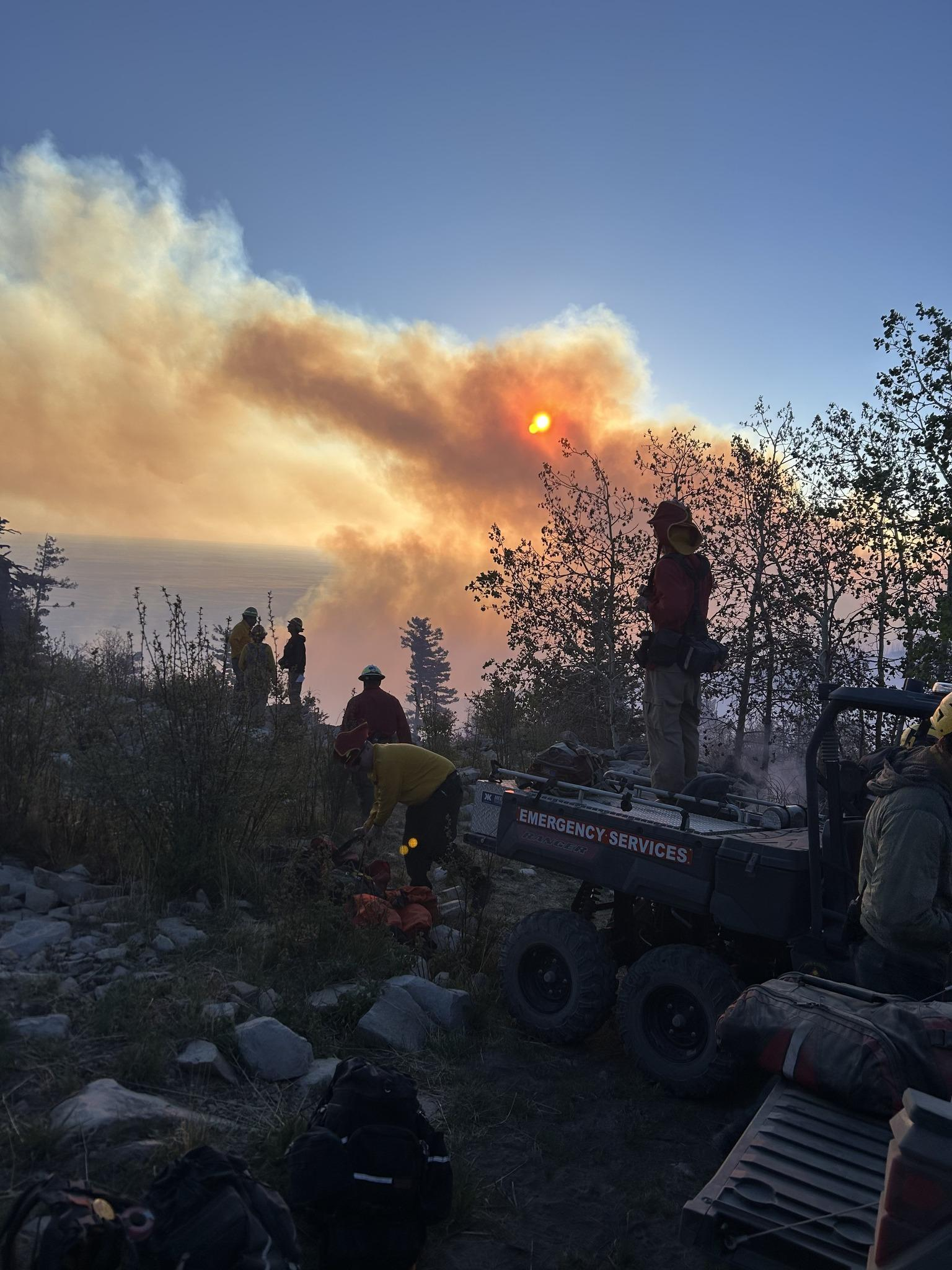
- Crews evaluating land during dusk on May 16
- Date: May 14 – June 12
- Location: Lincoln County, New Mexico

Statistics
- Perimeter: 100% contained
- Burned area: 31,770 acres (12,857 ha)

Impacts
- Deaths: 0
- Injuries: 0
- Cost: $29,600,000 USD

Ignition
- Cause: Medical plane crash

Map
- Perimeter map of the Seven Cabins Fire (map data)

The Seven Cabins Fire was a large wildfire that burned in the Capitan Mountains Wilderness in southern New Mexico, in the northern portion of the Lincoln National Forest. The fire was sparked by a medical plane crash and by June 12, 2026, the fire had burned over 31,000 acres before being 100% contained.

== Ignition ==
On May 14, 2026, a medical transport plane operated by aeromedical aviation vendor Generation Jets LLC (N249CP, owned by Angels Envy Aviation LLC) for the customer, TransAero Medevac with four passengers on board, was enroute to the Sierra Blanca Regional Airport and crashed in the Capitan Mountains just north of Ruidoso. The crash ignited a brush fire that spread to the surrounding vegetation and trees. The people on board the flight were two medical personnel and two pilots operating the aircraft.

== Progression ==
The fire rapidly grew to about 3 acres with aircraft and ground crews responding. The fire was initially burning in dry, dead, and downed logs from the 2024 Peppin Fire burn scar. The fire continued to grow and reached 150 acres by the end of the day into the nighttime hours, with airplane retardant being dropped on the fire in an effort to slow the fire's advance.

The next day, the fire surpassed 500 acres as crews attempted removing fuels ahead of the fire, with the fire still growing to 900 acres the next day. 125 personnel were on the blaze continuing their operations.

=== May 16–25 ===
On May 16, low humidity and high winds allowed significant growth on the northern half of the fire for most of the day, with evacuations occurring for several zones and a fire warning being issued by the National Weather Service. During the evening, the fire became established in the Peachtree Canyon and was still pushing hard to the Northeast. More personnel were staffing the fire after this growth.

On May 17, the fire was 8,900 acres with zero percent containment. Extreme fire weather conditions caused the fire to grow at a significant pace one more to the northeast, with aerial firefighting operations being suspended due to the high winds and a set evacuation being issued for Highway 246. The fire had doubled in size to over 12,000 acres and its personnel nearly tripled.

The fire remained very active on May 18 as continued fire weather conditions hindered efforts to contain the fire. As a result, the wildfire gained another 3,000 acres, but this time mostly to the south due to a wind shift from the north. The next day and the day after, the conditions let up and crews were able to take advantage of this lull in activity by increasing containment to 7%. Mop up operations were conducted on May 20 as the fire's growth slowed and containment lines held. Helicopter drops were also utilized but forest closures remained.

Heavy firing operations were held on the next day and the day after on the eastern section of the fire between two roads. The firing, along with 150,000 gallons of water dropped by aviation helped to slow the fire's spread and increase containment to 15% Interior fuels not burned in the operations were burned by the wildfire itself and acreage therefore underwent another large leap, growing beyond 22,000 by the end of these operations. They were however held again in the coming days on the southern parameter. Active fire behavior continued beyond the operations in timber understory. A containment leap was achieved on the 23rd as more mop up operations were underway on the northern half of the fire.

The fire was still active and growing to the south as of May 25. Over 28,000 acres were burned with over 1,000 personnel currently battling the fire, including dozers, engines, hand crews and numerous helicopters. Rainfall occurred over the fire perimeter which was quoted as "much needed" by firefighters.

=== May 26–June 12 ===
Containment continued to increase on the northern section of the fire in the coming days as more rain and thunderstorms moved over the fire area dropping beneficial rain. This significantly lessened fire behavior and Highway 246 was back open to traffic with evacuations downgraded to set and ready status. Drier conditions returned for the next several days after this wetting precipitation, increasing fire behavior once more driving the flames downslope due to winds on the southern perimeter and active fire inside the burned area. At the same time, crews continued mopping up along the edges to the north and east. Still over 1,100 firefighters were fighting the blaze over these next several days.

A Type 2 Incident Management Team took control of the fire on May 30 as fire conditions continued and crews needed extra help, and with this change, containment continued to increase into the 50s range. A different strategy which moved focus away from the frame front burning to the south induced burning out a small piece of land and bringing low intensity fire down steep slopes, increasing Containment in the process to 61%. The fire also surpassed 30,000 acres the next day.

By June, containment continued to increase, personnel decrease, and acreage staying the same, with the perimeter reaching 90% successful enclosure by the 8th.

The fire was completely secured and therefore 100% contained on June 12.

== Impacts ==
The fire caused poor air quality due to winds blowing smoke plumes across the state, including into Ruidoso, where up to unhealthy air quality persisted. Multiple shelters were set up to the east of the fire at the Lincoln County Fairgrounds in Capitan, NM to handle animals, horses, and large livestock that needed care. At its peak the fire also led to major closures of the National Forest. No structures were destroyed by the fire despite it spurring several evacuations.

== Growth and containment table ==
Fire containment status Gray: contained; Red: active; %: percent contained;
Date	Area burned	Personnel	Containment
May 14	150 acres (61 ha)	Unknown	
May 15	577 acres (234 ha)	125	
May 16	889 acres (360 ha)	125	
May 17	6,361 acres (2,574 ha)	226	
May 18	12,549 acres (5,078 ha)	613	
May 19	15,858 acres (6,418 ha)	691	
May 20	16,443 acres (6,654 ha)	787	
May 21	16,703 acres (6,759 ha)	834	
May 22	17,852 acres (7,224 ha)	863	
May 23	24,437 acres (9,889 ha)	913	
May 24	25,186 acres (10,192 ha)	916	
May 25	26,443 acres (10,701 ha)	966	
May 26	28,750 acres (11,630 ha)	1,073	
May 27	28,750 acres (11,630 ha)	1,104	
May 28	28,907 acres (11,698 ha)	1,114	
May 29	28,907 acres (11,698 ha)	1,055	
May 30	28,910 acres (11,700 ha)	841	
May 31	29,167 acres (11,803 ha)	836	
June 1	29,531 acres (11,951 ha)	827	
June 2	31,770 acres (12,860 ha)	650	
June 3	31,770 acres (12,860 ha)	583	
June 4	31,867 acres (12,896 ha)	544	
June 5	31,870 acres (12,900 ha)	484	
June 6	31,870 acres (12,900 ha)	489	
June 7	31,870 acres (12,900 ha)	474	
June 8	31,860 acres (12,890 ha)	327	
June 9	31,860 acres (12,890 ha)	327	
June 10	31,860 acres (12,890 ha)	200	
June 11	31,860 acres (12,890 ha)	159	
June 12	31,860 acres (12,890 ha)	159	
