= Hollywood, New Mexico =

Coordinates: 33°19′24″N 105°38′06″W

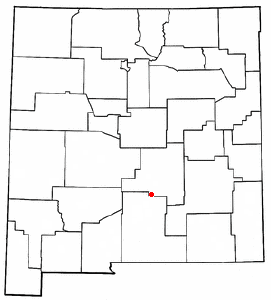
Location of Ruidoso, New Mexico

Hollywood is a neighborhood of Ruidoso, in Lincoln County, New Mexico, United States and is part of the Lincoln National Forest. It is located along State Road 48 and U.S. Route 70 in the eastern end of the village, adjacent to Ruidoso Downs. The town was originally named after Hollywood, Florida, and includes a post office (established 1926), homes, hotels, and retail outlets.

== Nearby cities and towns ==
- Ruidoso Downs, New Mexico
- Alto, New Mexico
- Tularosa, New Mexico
- Mescalero, New Mexico
- Bent, New Mexico
- Alamogordo, New Mexico
- Lincoln, New Mexico
- Capitan, New Mexico
- Cloudcroft, New Mexico
- Carrizozo, New Mexico
- Mayhill, New Mexico
- Roswell, New Mexico
