= New Mexico State Road 37 =

State highway in New Mexico, United States

State Road 37
- NM 37 highlighted in red

Route information
- Maintained by NMDOT
- Length: 14.162 mi (22.792 km)

Major junctions
- South end: NM 48 near Alto
- North end: US 380 near Nogal

Location
- Country: United States
- State: New Mexico
- Counties: Lincoln

Highway system
- New Mexico State Highway System; Interstate; US; State; Scenic
← NM 36	→ NM 38

State Road 37 (NM 37) is a 14.162-mile-long (22.792 km) state road that runs north-south through the Sacramento Mountains, which are part of the Lincoln National Forest in Lincoln County, in the U.S. state of New Mexico. Its southern terminus is at NM 48, several miles north of Ruidoso and its northern terminus is at U.S. Route 380 (US 380), several miles west of the Town of Capitan.

== Route description ==
The route begins at an intersection with NM 48 slightly north of the small town of Angus. Heading westward, the route winds in and out of the Lincoln National Forest, heading through a forested terrain. After a brief stretch, the road again enters the national forest, turning west and north near Nogal Lake. The route then resumes its north-northeasterly direction. NM 37 passes the town of Nogal after again exiting the national forest. The roadway then turns northeast, almost parallel to US 380 for several miles. The route's northern terminus is at a junction with US 380 between Capitan and Carrizozo.

== Major intersections ==
The entire route is in Lincoln County.

Location	mi	km	Destinations	Notes
	0.000	0.000	NM 48 – Ruidoso, Capitan	Southern terminus
	14.162	22.792	US 380 – Carrizozo, Capitan	Northern terminus
1.000 mi = 1.609 km; 1.000 km = 0.621 mi
