= New Mexico State Road 368 =

State highway in New Mexico, United States

State Road 368
- NM 368 highlighted in red

Route information
- Maintained by NMDOT
- Length: 17.458 mi (28.096 km)

Major junctions
- Southern end: US 70 / US 380 in Tinnie
- Northern end: End of state maintenance in Arabela

Location
- Country: United States
- State: New Mexico
- Counties: Lincoln

Highway system
- New Mexico State Highway System; Interstate; US; State; Scenic
← NM 367	→ NM 369

State Road 368 (NM 368) is a 17.458-mile-long (28.096 km) state highway in the US state of New Mexico. NM 368's southern terminus is at U.S. Route 70 (US 70) and US 380 in Tinnie, and the northern terminus is at the end of state maintenance in Arabela.

== Major intersections ==
The entire route is in Lincoln County.

Location	mi	km	Destinations	Notes
Tinnie	0.000	0.000	US 70 / US 380	Southern terminus
Arabela	17.458	28.096	End of state maintenance	Northern terminus
1.000 mi = 1.609 km; 1.000 km = 0.621 mi
