= 2026 Ruidoso Beechcraft King Air crash =

Aviation incident in New Mexico, United States

- N249CP, the aircraft involved in the accident, seen in 2007

Accident
- Date: May 14, 2026
- Summary: Crash into mountainous terrain
- Site: Capitan Mountains Northwest of Ruidoso, New Mexico, US

Aircraft
- Aircraft type: Beechcraft C90 King Air
- Operator: Angels Envy Aviation LLC on behalf of Generations Jets
- Registration: N249CP
- Flight origin: Roswell International Air Center
- Destination: Sierra Blanca Regional Airport
- Occupants: 4
- Passengers: 2
- Crew: 2
- Fatalities: 4
- Survivors: 0

On May 14, 2026, a Beechcraft C90 King Air medical evacuation aircraft operated by Trans Aero MedEvac crashed near Ruidoso, New Mexico, United States. The crash killed all four people on board. The plane took off from Roswell International Air Center, en route to Sierra Blanca Regional Airport.

The crash ignited the Seven Cabins Fire in Lincoln National Forest, which grew to over 19 square miles (49 km^{2}).

== Investigation ==
On June 17, 2026, the National Transportation Safety Board released a preliminary report, describing GPS problems encountered by the pilots. Investigators noted they would not identify a cause of the crash until the report's full release in 2027.

In July 2026, Wired published an investigation linking a GPS jamming exercise held by the 746th Test Squadron of the 704th Test Group at White Sands Missile Range to the crash, noting that this may have been the first crash of a civilian aircraft in the US in which GPS jamming was a contributing factor. The exercise was part of the annual NAVFEST event, two weeks of electronic warfare exercises held at the range due to its remote location. There was a previous a close call in the vicinity of Sun Valley, Idaho in 2018 involving a civilian aircraft that was also linked to a military jamming exercise. And in 2012 there was another similar incident near Reno, Nevada where the pilots noted the jamming and were able to correct course.

== See also ==
- Controlled flight into terrain
