= New Mexico State Road 247 =

State highway in New Mexico, United States

State Road 247

Route information
- Maintained by NMDOT
- Length: 48.342 mi (77.799 km)
- Existed: 1988–present

Major junctions
- West end: US 54 in Corona
- East end: US 285 near Ramon

Location
- Country: United States
- State: New Mexico
- Counties: De Baca, Lincoln

Highway system
- New Mexico State Highway System; Interstate; US; State; Scenic
← NM 246	→ NM 248

State Road 247 (NM 247) is a 48.342-mile-long (77.799 km) state highway in the US state of New Mexico. NM 247's western terminus is at U.S. Route 54 (US 54) in Corona, and the eastern terminus is at US 285 south-southeast of Ramon.

== History ==
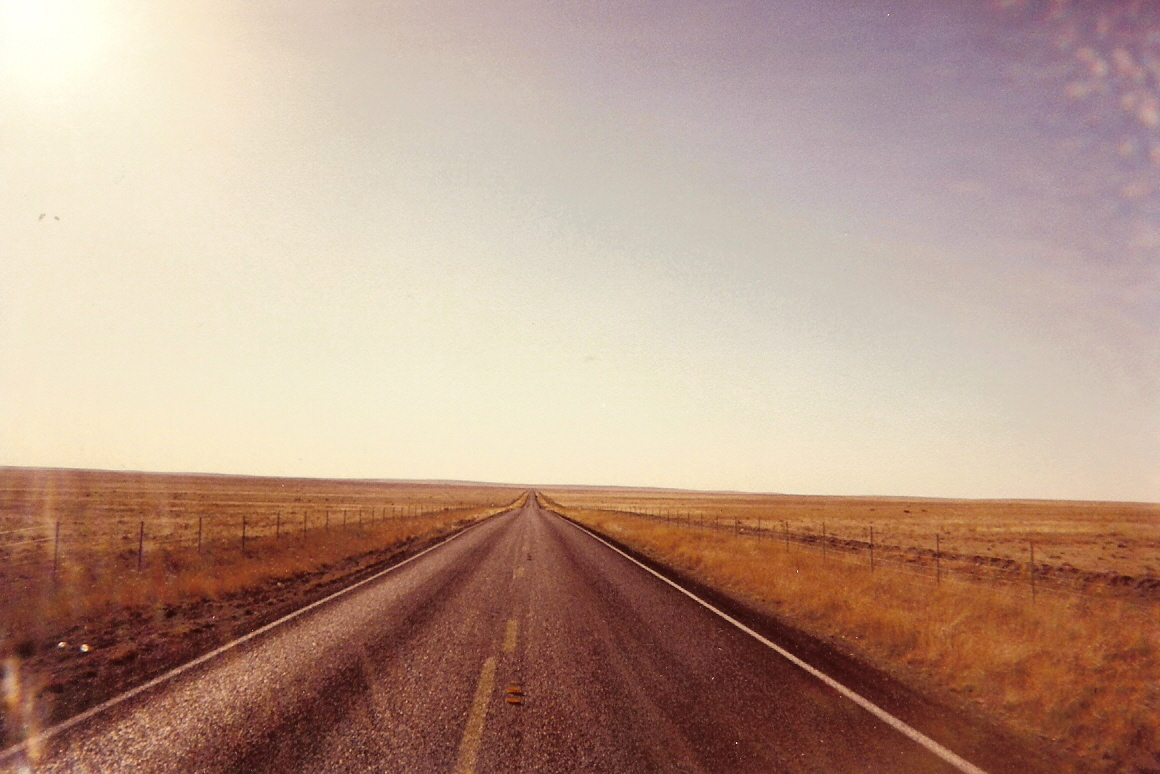
NM 247

NM 247 was created in the 1988 renumbering when NM 42 was shortened. Before 1988 it was the easternmost segment of NM 42.

== Major intersections ==
County	Location	mi	km	Destinations	Notes
Lincoln	Corona	0.000	0.000	US 54	Western terminus
De Baca		48.342	77.799	US 285	Eastern terminus
1.000 mi = 1.609 km; 1.000 km = 0.621 mi
