= New Mexico State Road 221 =

State highway in New Mexico, United States

State Road 221

Route information
- Maintained by NMDOT
- Length: 4.648 mi (7.480 km)

Major junctions
- South end: CR 303 near Alire
- North end: US 84 in Cebolla

Location
- Country: United States
- State: New Mexico
- Counties: Rio Arriba

Highway system
- New Mexico State Highway System; Interstate; US; State; Scenic
← NM 220	→ NM 222

State Road 221 (NM 221) is a 4.648-mile-long (7.480 km) state highway in the US state of New Mexico. NM 221's southern terminus is at County Route 303 (CR 303) northeast of Alire, and the northern terminus is at U.S. Route 84 (US 84) in Cebolla.

== Major intersections ==
The entire route is in Rio Arriba County.

Location	mi	km	Destinations	Notes
	0.000	0.000	CR 303	Southern terminus
Cebolla	4.648	7.480	US 84	Northern terminus
1.000 mi = 1.609 km; 1.000 km = 0.621 mi
