= Ruidoso Downs, New Mexico =

- City
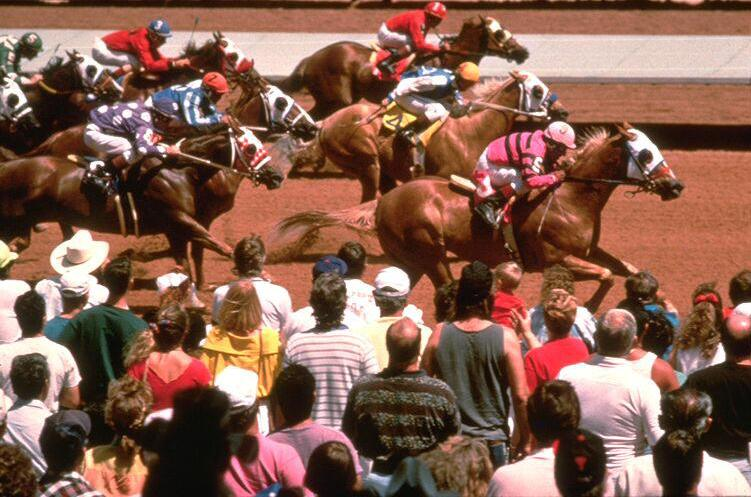
- Horse racing at Ruidoso Downs

- Location of Ruidoso Downs, New Mexico

- Location in the United States
- Coordinates: 33°19′54″N 105°35′46″W
- Country: United States
- State: New Mexico
- County: Lincoln

Area
  - Total: 3.79 sq mi (9.82 km^{2})
  - Land: 3.79 sq mi (9.82 km^{2})
  - Water: 0 sq mi (0.00 km^{2})
- Elevation: 6,441 ft (1,963 m)

Population (2020)
  - Total: 2,620
  - Density: 691.3/sq mi (266.93/km^{2})
- Time zone: UTC-7 (Mountain (MST))
  - Summer (DST): UTC-6 (MDT)
- ZIP code: 88346
- Area code: 575
- FIPS code: 35-65280
- GNIS feature ID: 2411014
- Website: ruidosodowns.us

Ruidoso Downs is a city in Lincoln County, New Mexico, United States, located within the Lincoln National Forest. As of the 2020 census, Ruidoso Downs had a population of 2,620. Originally incorporated as a village, it became a city in May 2002. Known locally as "the Downs", Ruidoso Downs is a municipality separate from and adjacent to the Village of Ruidoso. The city, located along U.S. Route 70, is named after the Ruidoso Downs Race Track, which is located in the city along with the Billy the Kid Casino. The city is home to the Hubbard Museum of the American West.

== History ==
According to a local Ruidoso Downs historian, early on Hispanos settlers called the area "San Juanito". The settlers began arriving in the early in the late 1840s, and introduced rodeo and horse racing to the area. Originally the area had scattered farms and ranches, with the Dowlin Mill constructed in 1868. A new wave of families arrived after the Lincoln County War.

By around 1907 the road between Roswell and Alamogordo, which passed through the area, was still primitive, though it was improved in the 1920s through the Federal Aid Project. The road that would become US 70 was paved in the area around 1945, and then improved again in 1958. The road became four lanes in 1981.

In 1946 the Ruidoso News was founded and the airport opened, and two years later radio arrived. Electric lights appeared in the area in 1947. The White Mountain Inn opened in the 1940s as a sanatorium and as a lodging establishment.

== Geography ==
Ruidoso Downs is located in southern Lincoln County and is bordered to the west by Ruidoso.

U.S. Route 70 passes through the city, leading east 69 miles (111 km) to Roswell and southwest over Apache Summit 34 miles (55 km) to Tularosa. New Mexico State Road 48 departs US 70 just west of the city limits, leading north 22 miles (35 km) to Capitan.

According to the United States Census Bureau, the city has an area of 3.8 square miles (9.8 km^{2}), all of it recorded as land. The city is in the valley of the Rio Ruidoso, which rises to the west on Sierra Blanca Peak and flows east to form the Rio Hondo.

== Demographics ==
Historical population
Census	Pop.	Note	%±
1950	363		—
1960	407		12.1%
1970	702		72.5%
1980	949		35.2%
1990	920		−3.1%
2000	1,824		98.3%
2010	2,815		54.3%
2020	2,620		−6.9%
U.S. Decennial Census

=== 2020 census ===
As of the 2020 census, Ruidoso Downs had a population of 2,620. The median age was 36.4 years. 25.5% of residents were under the age of 18 and 16.6% of residents were 65 years of age or older. For every 100 females, there were 91.1 males, and for every 100 females age 18 and over, there were 92.7 males.

84.7% of residents lived in urban areas, while 15.3% lived in rural areas.

There were 1,030 households in Ruidoso Downs, of which 35.2% had children under the age of 18 living in them. Of all households, 39.8% were married-couple households, 20.3% were households with a male householder and no spouse or partner present, and 30.1% were households with a female householder and no spouse or partner present. About 28.7% of all households were made up of individuals, and 11.7% had someone living alone who was 65 years of age or older.

There were 1,463 housing units, of which 29.6% were vacant. The homeowner vacancy rate was 2.7%, and the rental vacancy rate was 7.1%.

Racial composition as of the 2020 census
Race	Number	Percent
White	1,324	50.5%
Black or African American	15	0.6%
American Indian and Alaska Native	154	5.9%
Asian	20	0.8%
Native Hawaiian and Other Pacific Islander	0	0.0%
Some other race	562	21.5%
Two or more races	545	20.8%
Hispanic or Latino (of any race)	1,440	55.0%

=== 2000 census ===
As of the census of 2000, there were 1,824 people, 680 households, and 490 families residing in the village. The population density was 856.7 inhabitants per square mile (330.8/km^{2}). There were 921 housing units at an average density of 432.6 per square mile (167.0/km^{2}). The racial makeup of the village was 67.32% White, 0.77% African American, 3.56% Native American, 0.71% Asian, 0.27% Pacific Islander, 24.45% from other races, and 2.91% from two or more races. Hispanic or Latino of any race were 43.70% of the population.

There were 680 households, out of which 39.0% had children under the age of 18 living with them, 48.8% were married couples living together, 17.4% had a female householder with no husband present, and 27.8% were non-families. 21.2% of all households were made up of individuals, and 5.1% had someone living alone who was 65 years of age or older. The average household size was 2.68 and the average family size was 3.09.

In the city the population was spread out, with 29.1% under the age of 18, 8.2% from 18 to 24, 28.6% from 25 to 44, 24.8% from 45 to 64, and 9.4% who were 65 years of age or older. The median age was 35 years. For every 100 females, there were 95.9 males. For every 100 females age 18 and over, there were 92.4 males.

The median income for a household in the village was $29,375, and the median income for a family was $30,500. Males had a median income of $22,000 versus $17,623 for females. The per capita income for the village was $12,144. About 17.4% of families and 20.6% of the population were below the poverty line, including 29.7% of those under age 18 and 5.9% of those age 65 or over.

== Economy ==
Ruidoso Downs' economy is primarily driven by tourism with the industries that support it being major employers, with 27.1% of the employed population working in the "Arts, Entertainment and Recreation, and Accommodation and Food Services" industry.

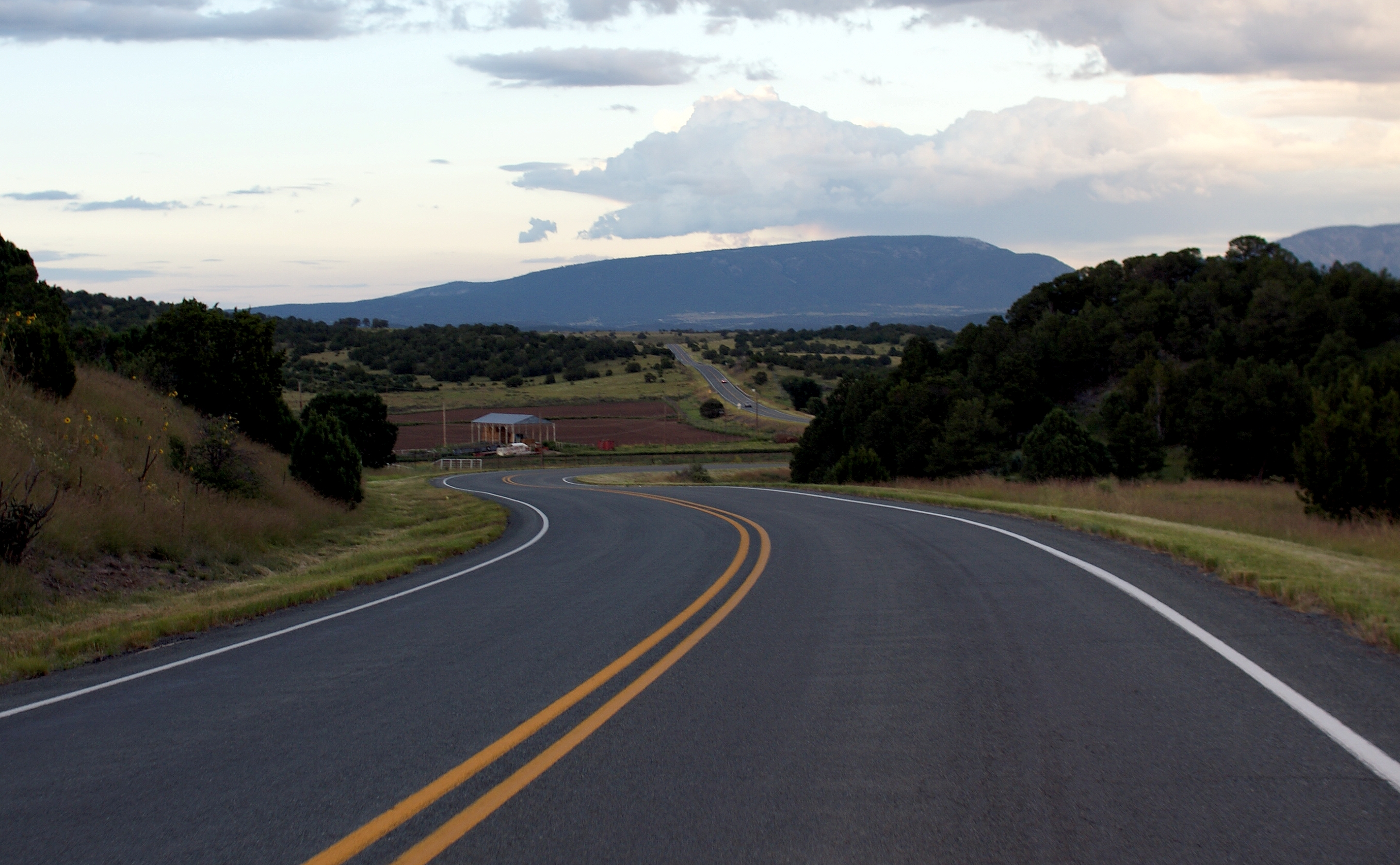
Road heading towards Capitan

== Transportation ==
=== Airports ===
- Sierra Blanca Regional Airport, located about 19 miles (31 km) by road northeast of Ruidoso Downs.

=== Major highways ===
- U.S. Route 70

== Key facilities ==
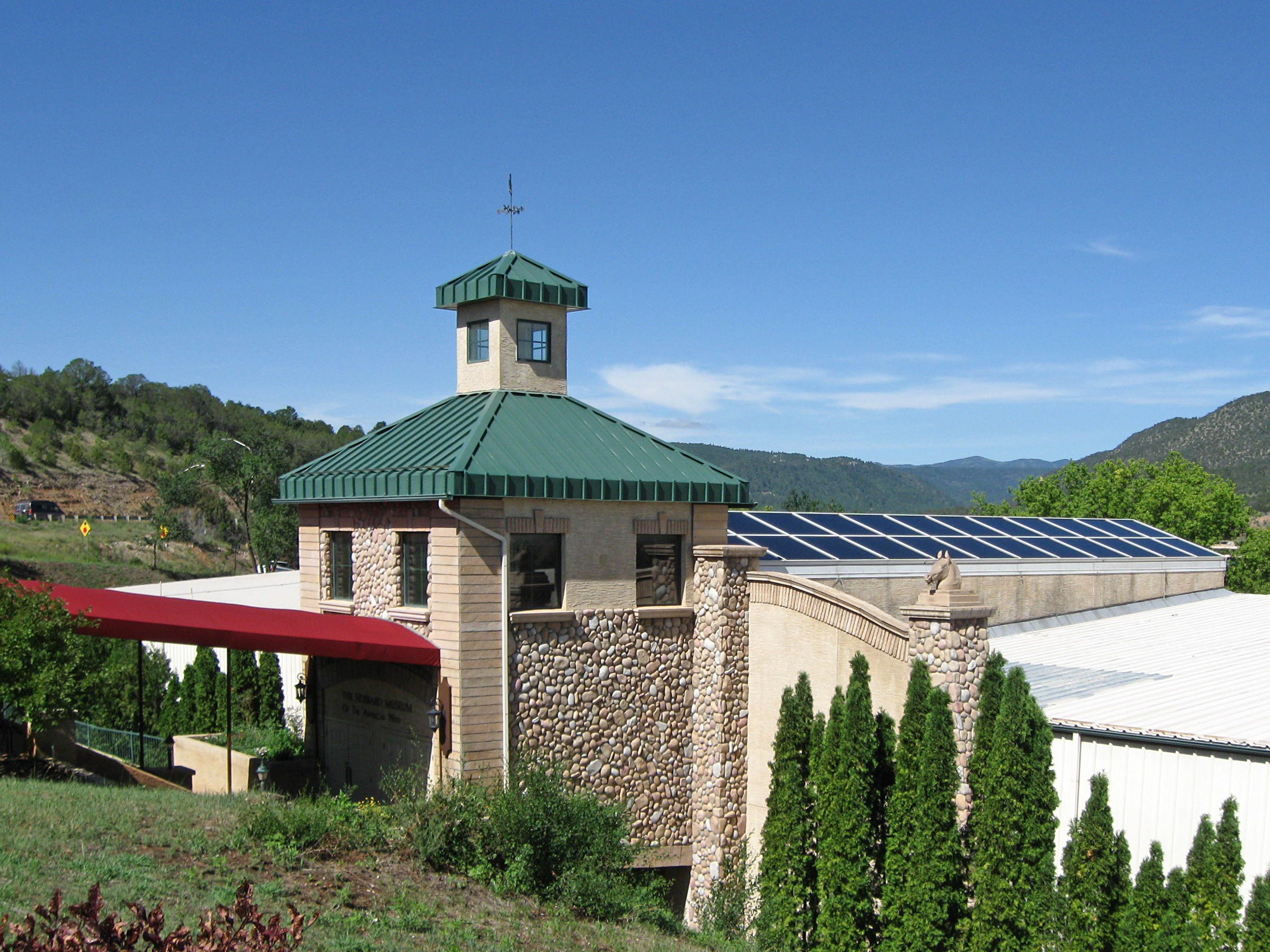
Hubbard Museum of the American West

- Ruidoso Downs Race Track
- Billy the Kid Casino
- Hubbard Museum of the American West

== Events and culture ==
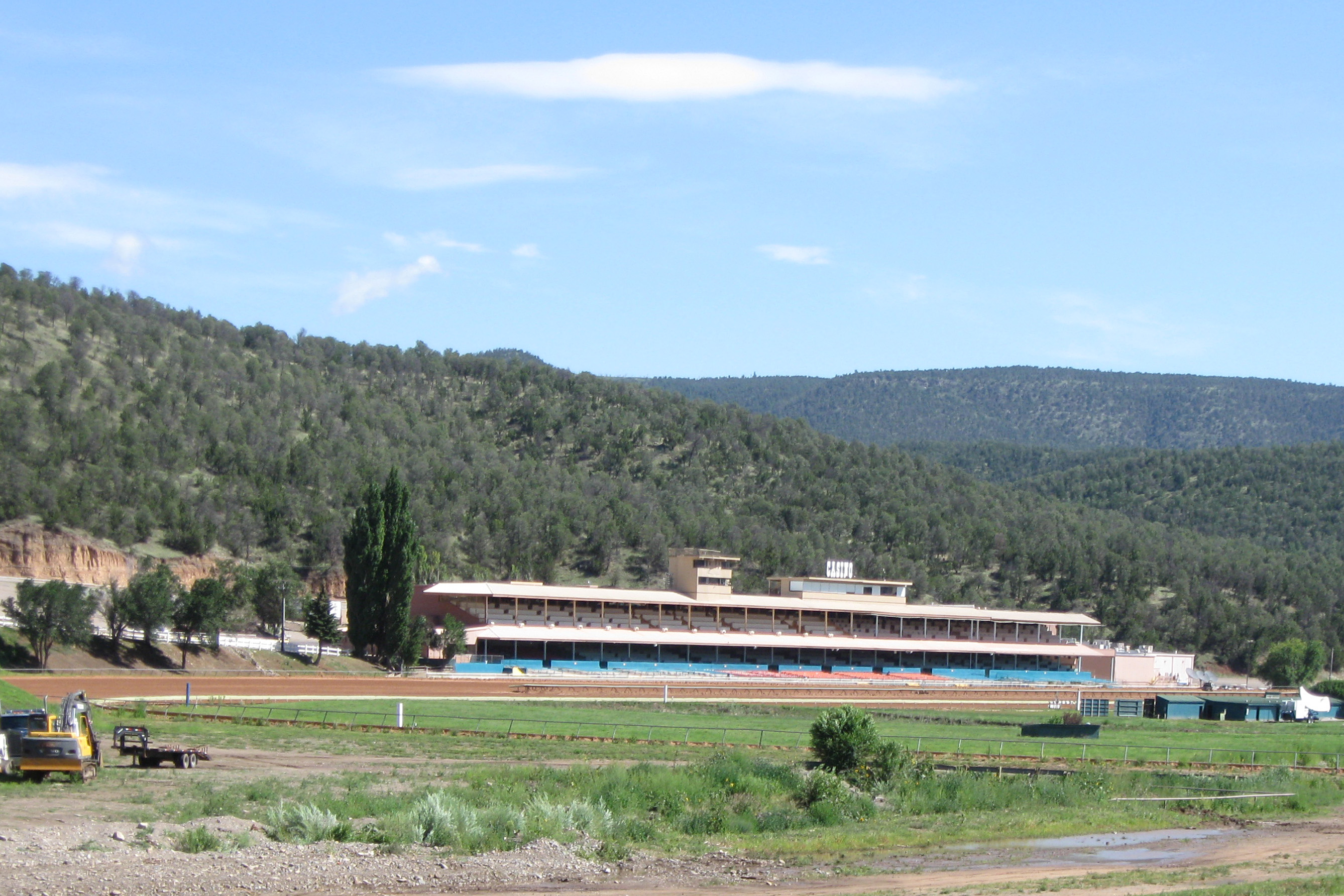
Ruidoso Downs Race Track and Casino, where the All American Futurity is held annually.

The city is the annual location of the All American Futurity, which claims to be the richest race in Quarter Horse racing.

== See also ==
- Lincoln National Forest
