= Billy the Kid Trail =

The Billy the Kid Trail, or Broken Trail, is a national scenic byway that runs from Lincoln County through Capitan, New Mexico. The trail was allegedly used by William H. Bonney (aka Billy The Kid) and his group during the Lincoln County War.
