= New Mexico State Road 532 =

State highway in New Mexico, United States

State Road 532
- NM 532 highlighted in red

Route information
- Maintained by NMDOT
- Length: 11.869 mi (19.101 km)

Major junctions
- West end: Sierra Blanca Ski Recreation Area
- East end: NM 48 near Ruidoso

Location
- Country: United States
- State: New Mexico
- Counties: Lincoln

Highway system
- New Mexico State Highway System; Interstate; US; State; Scenic
← NM 531	→ NM 533

State Road 532 (NM 532) is a 11.869-mile-long (19.101 km) state highway in the US state of New Mexico. NM 532's western terminus is at the end of route at Sierra Blanca Ski Recreation Area, and the eastern terminus is at NM 48 north of Ruidoso.

== Major intersections ==
The entire route is in Lincoln County.

Location	mi	km	Destinations	Notes
	0.000	0.000	NM 48	Eastern terminus
	11.869	19.101	Sierra Blanca Ski Recreation Area	Western terminus
1.000 mi = 1.609 km; 1.000 km = 0.621 mi
