= New Mexico State Road 220 =

State highway in New Mexico, United States

State Road 220
- Billy the Kid Trail

Route information
- Maintained by NMDOT
- Length: 16.008 mi (25.762 km)

Major junctions
- West end: NM 48 near Alto
- East end: US 380 near Capitan

Location
- Country: United States
- State: New Mexico
- Counties: Lincoln

Highway system
- New Mexico State Highway System; Interstate; US; State; Scenic
← NM 219	→ NM 221

State Road 220 (NM 220) is a 16.008-mile-long (25.762 km) state highway in the US state of New Mexico. NM 220's western terminus is at NM 48 northwest of Alto, and the eastern terminus is at U.S. Route 380 (US 380) east of Capitan.

== Major intersections ==
The entire route is in Lincoln County.

Location	mi	km	Destinations	Notes
	0.000	0.000	NM 48	Western terminus
	11.595	18.660	CR E7 south	Northern terminus of former NM 214; northern terminus of CR E7
	16.008	25.762	US 380	Eastern terminus
1.000 mi = 1.609 km; 1.000 km = 0.621 mi
