= Bluewater, Lincoln County, New Mexico =

Bluewater, New Mexico
- Unincorporated community
- Location within New Mexico Location within the United States
- Coordinates: 33°33′28″N 105°11′10″W
- Country: United States
- State: New Mexico
- County: Lincoln
- Elevation: 5,508 ft (1,679 m)
- Time zone: UTC-7 (Mountain (MST))
  - Summer (DST): UTC-6 (MDT)
- Area code: 575
- GNIS feature ID: 903960

Bluewater is an unincorporated community in Lincoln County, New Mexico, United States. Bluewater is 22.3 miles (35.9 km) east of Capitan.
