= New Mexico State Road 42 =

State highway in New Mexico, United States

State Road 42

Route information
- Maintained by NMDOT
- Length: 35.542 mi (57.199 km)

Major junctions
- South end: US 54 in Corona
- North end: US 60 in Willard

Location
- Country: United States
- State: New Mexico
- Counties: Lincoln, Torrance

Highway system
- New Mexico State Highway System; Interstate; US; State; Scenic
← NM 41	→ NM 45

State Road 42 (NM 42) is a state highway in the US state of New Mexico. Its total length is approximately 35.5 miles (57.1 km). NM 42's southern terminus is in the village of Corona, at U.S. Route 54 (US 54) and NM 42's northern terminus is in the village of Willard, at US 60.

== Major intersections ==
County	Location	mi	km	Destinations	Notes
Lincoln	Corona	0.000	0.000	US 54	Southern terminus
Torrance	Willard	35.542	57.199	US 60	Northern terminus
1.000 mi = 1.609 km; 1.000 km = 0.621 mi
