= New Mexico State Road 246 =

State highway in New Mexico, United States

State Road 246

Route information
- Maintained by NMDOT
- Length: 82.456 mi (132.700 km)
- Existed: 1988–present

Major junctions
- West end: US 380 in Capitan
- East end: US 70 / US 285 (North Main Street) in Roswell

Location
- Country: United States
- State: New Mexico
- Counties: Chaves, Lincoln

Highway system
- New Mexico State Highway System; Interstate; US; State; Scenic
← NM 245	→ NM 247

State Road 246 (NM 246) is an 82.456-mile-long (132.700 km) state highway in the US state of New Mexico. NM 246's western terminus is at U.S. Route 380 (US 380) in Capitan, and the eastern terminus is at US 70 and US 285 in Roswell.

== History ==
NM 246 was created in the 1988 renumbering when NM 48 was shortened. Before 1988 it was the northernmost segment of NM 48.

== Major intersections ==
County	Location	mi	km	Destinations	Notes
Lincoln	Capitan	0.000	0.000	US 380	Western terminus
Chaves	Roswell	80.456	129.481	US 70 Truck / US 285 Truck	
Chaves	Roswell	82.456	132.700	US 70 / US 285 (North Main Street)	Eastern terminus
1.000 mi = 1.609 km; 1.000 km = 0.621 mi
