= Tinnie, New Mexico =

Unincorporated community in New Mexico, United States

- Unincorporated community
- Tinnie Silver Dollar Restaurant in 1991

- Location within New Mexico Location within the United States
- Coordinates: 33°22′14″N 105°13′35″W
- Country: United States
- State: New Mexico
- County: Lincoln
- Elevation: 5,171 ft (1,576 m)
- Time zone: UTC-7 (Mountain (MST))
  - Summer (DST): UTC-6 (MDT)
- ZIP codes: 88351
- Area code: 575
- GNIS feature ID: 923707

Tinnie is an unincorporated community located in Lincoln County, New Mexico, United States. The community is located on U.S. Route 70, 22 miles (35 km) east of Ruidoso Downs. Tinnie has a post office with ZIP code 88351.
