= Arabela, New Mexico =

- Unincorporated community
- Location within New Mexico Location within the United States
- Coordinates: 33°35′13″N 105°10′24″W
- Country: United States
- State: New Mexico
- County: Lincoln
- Elevation: 5,479 ft (1,670 m)
- Time zone: UTC-7 (Mountain (MST))
  - Summer (DST): UTC-6 (MDT)
- ZIP codes: 88351
- Area code: 575
- GNIS feature ID: 903252

Arabela is an unincorporated community located in Lincoln County, New Mexico, United States. Arabela is located in a rural part of eastern Lincoln County, 23.2 miles (37.3 km) east of Capitan.

A post office was established in 1901 and named Arabela by Andy Richardson, who became smitten with a local Apache woman, Arabela Barela. Barela, who with her sisters Damiana Barela and Carolina “Caro” Romero, owned and operated several cathouses in the area. The post office closed in 1928.
