= Fox Cave =

American roadside attraction

Coordinates: 33.3767°N 105.5158°W

- Ice Cave
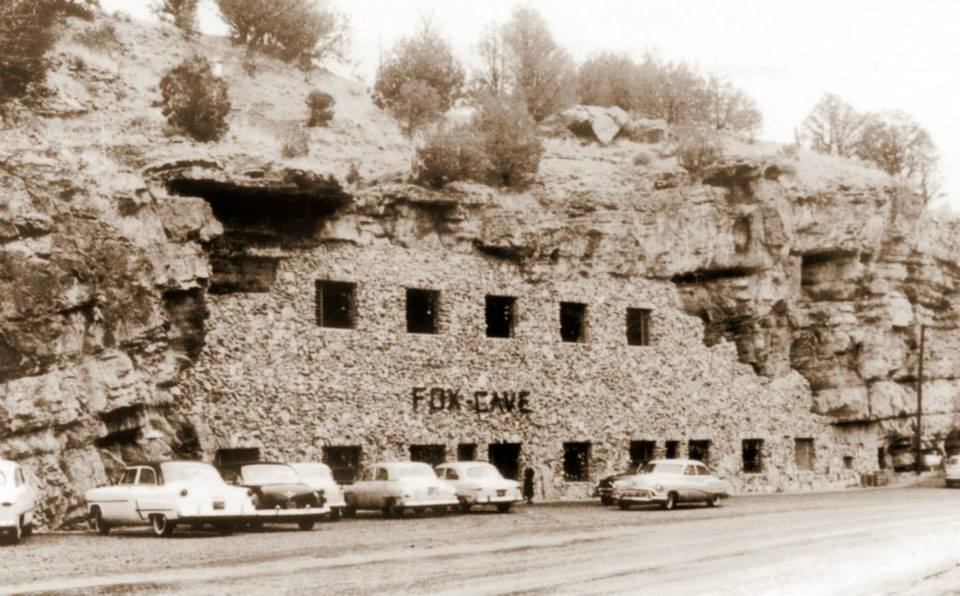
- A photo taken of the exterior of Fox Cave in 1955
- Interactive map of Fox Cave
- Location: Ruidoso, New Mexico
- Geology: Micritic limestone

Fox Cave is located on East Highway 70 between Roswell and Alamogordo, near Ruidoso, New Mexico. It was once used as a hideout by William H. Bonney, better known as Billy the Kid and also known as Henry Antrim, a 19th-century American gunman who participated in the Lincoln County War and became a frontier outlaw in the American Old West.

Originally known as "Ice Cave" in the late 1800s and early 1900s, the rocks of Fox Cave are primarily micritic limestone. The cave was formed over thousands of years by erosion of the rock caused by the Ruidoso River.

The Ruidoso River Museum was located at Fox Cave from 2013. The owner of the cave and museum constructed seven small buildings on the property at Fox Cave. The collection featured artifacts, photographs and documents relating to the notable figures of the Old West and those involved in the Lincoln County War, including Billy the Kid, sheriffs William Brady and Pat Garrett and lawyer and businessman Alexander McSween. The museum closed and was replaced with a retailer.
