= Ruidoso Downs Race Track =

Horse racing track

Coordinates: 33°19′54″N 105°36′29″W

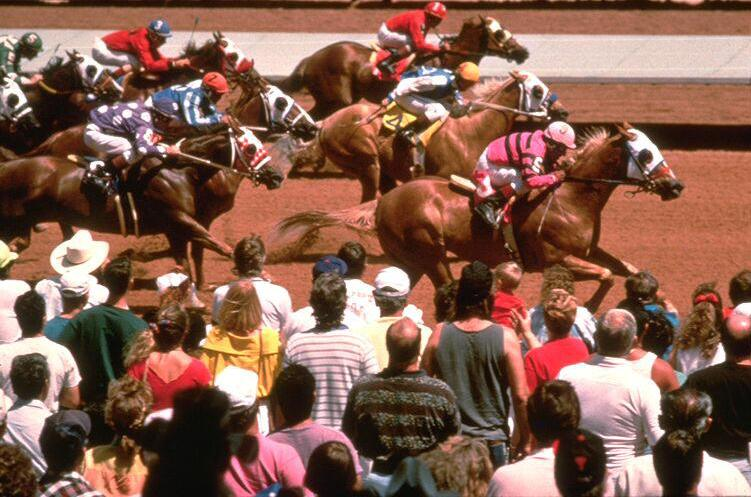
- Interactive map of Ruidoso Downs Race Track
- Location: Ruidoso Downs, New Mexico
- Notable races: All American Futurity, All American Derby

Ruidoso Downs is a now-closed horse racing track in Ruidoso Downs, New Mexico. The track previously hosted both Thoroughbred and Quarter Horse racing, notably the All American Futurity, the richest race in Quarter Horse racing with a purse of $3,000,000.

It also hosted the Grade I All American Derby in early September, which carries a purse of $1,200,000 and was won in 2023 by the Missouri-bred gelding Whiskey Creek.

The casino had over 300 slot machines. One dining option was The Cantina at Billy The Kid Casino.

== History ==
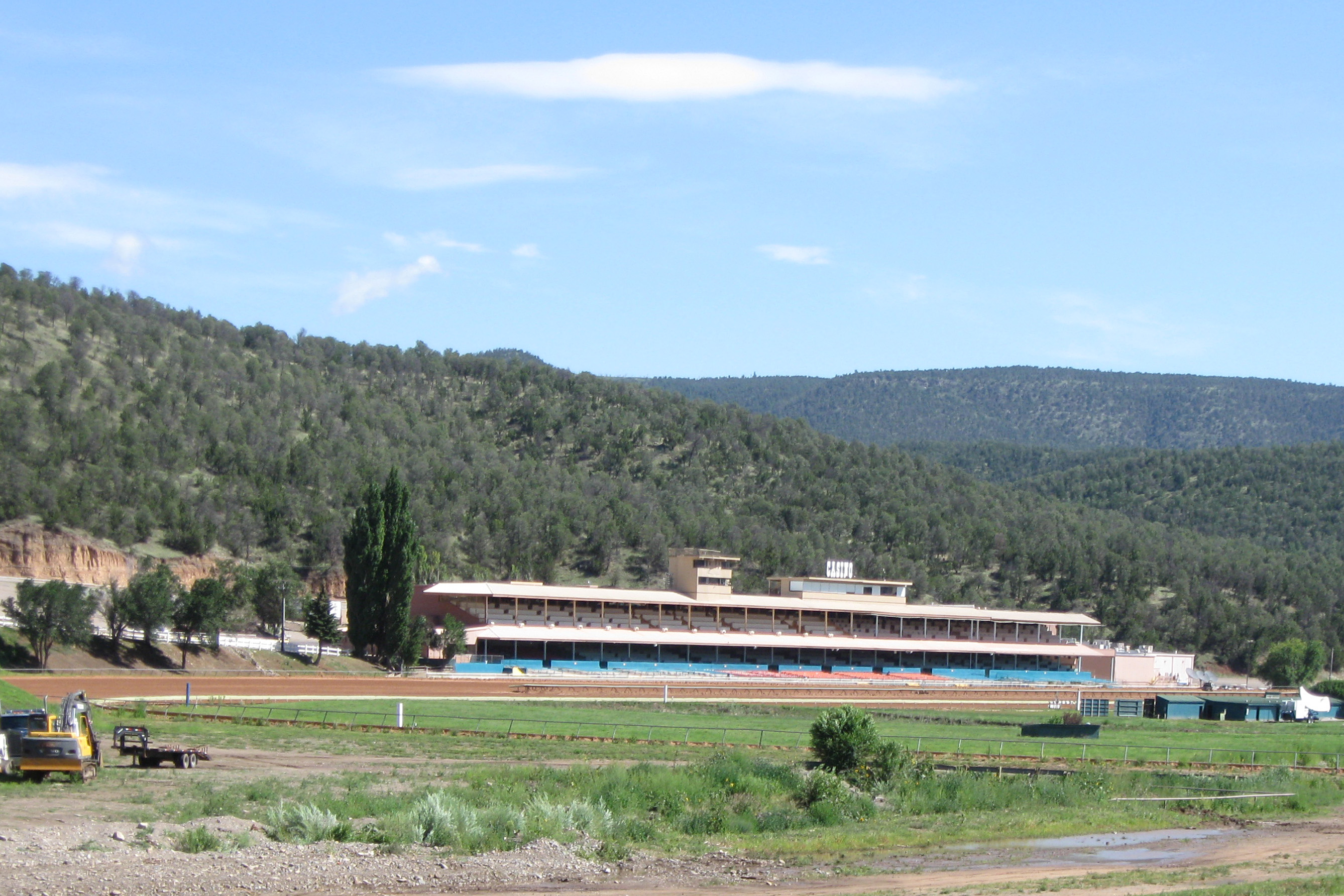
Pictured is the Ruidoso Downs New Mexico Racetrack and Casino, where the All American Futurity is held annually.

After a flood covered fields in gravel and silt in the small village of Ruidoso Downs, an informal race track was built on the fields in the 1940s. Bets varied from as "little as a bag of oats or $10,000 to $50,000 was being bet." A rodeo stand was moved from the village of Capitan, New Mexico to the field in 1945. Arizona investor Eugene Hensley bought the racetrack in 1953, becoming its general manager. Over the next decade the facility would undergo a number of expansions, and around 1957, the All American Futurity was created by Hensley, Carl Mercer, and cowboy musician Ray Reed. Held at the racetrack on Labor Day starting in 1959, they added The Rainbow Futurity in 1964. In 1988 the majority of Ruidoso Downs Race Track was purchased by R.D. Hubbard. Though the track had fallen into disrepair, within a year Hubbard and a business partner invested several million dollars into improving the track. 1989 also saw the addition of simulcast racing and wagering, while Hubbard bought out Allred in 1991. Soon a sales pavilion and sports theatre were constructed, which is where the Ruidoso Select Yearling Sale is held. The facilities have also housed camel and ostrich races, as well as concerts by artists such as Toby Keith and Emilio Navaira. An adjacent casino was opened by the Hubbards in 1999. The 1937 Kentucky Derby trophy won by War Admiral is typically kept on display at Ruidoso Downs.

In 2024 Ruidoso Downs was affected by a number of natural disasters. In June of that year, the city of Ruidoso Downs was evacuated due to two wildfires. The track was then hit by several storms in the month that followed, causing heavy rain and flooding. On July 21, the day after flooding washed out part of the track and caused the cancellation of the latter part of the racing program, track management announced that the remainder of that year's Ruidoso Downs meet would be moved to The Downs at Albuquerque in Albuquerque, New Mexico. The move would affect that year's All American Futurity and supporting races.

In February 2025 track management announced that Ruidoso Downs would focus exclusively on Quarter Horse racing for that year, adding that repairs from the floods were continuing. However, in July the track was once again affected by heavy flooding and the rest of the year's racing was cancelled. At the time of the cancellation announcement, there was no word on the fate of the 2025 All American Futurity.

== Physical attributes ==
Ruidoso Downs has two dirt courses: a 550-yard straightaway used exclusively for Quarter Horse races, and a 7/8-mile dirt oval for Thoroughbred races, longer-distance Quarter Horse races and training.

== See also ==
- Ruidoso Downs, New Mexico
