= Alto, New Mexico =

Unincorporated community in Lincoln County, New Mexico, United States

- unincorporated community
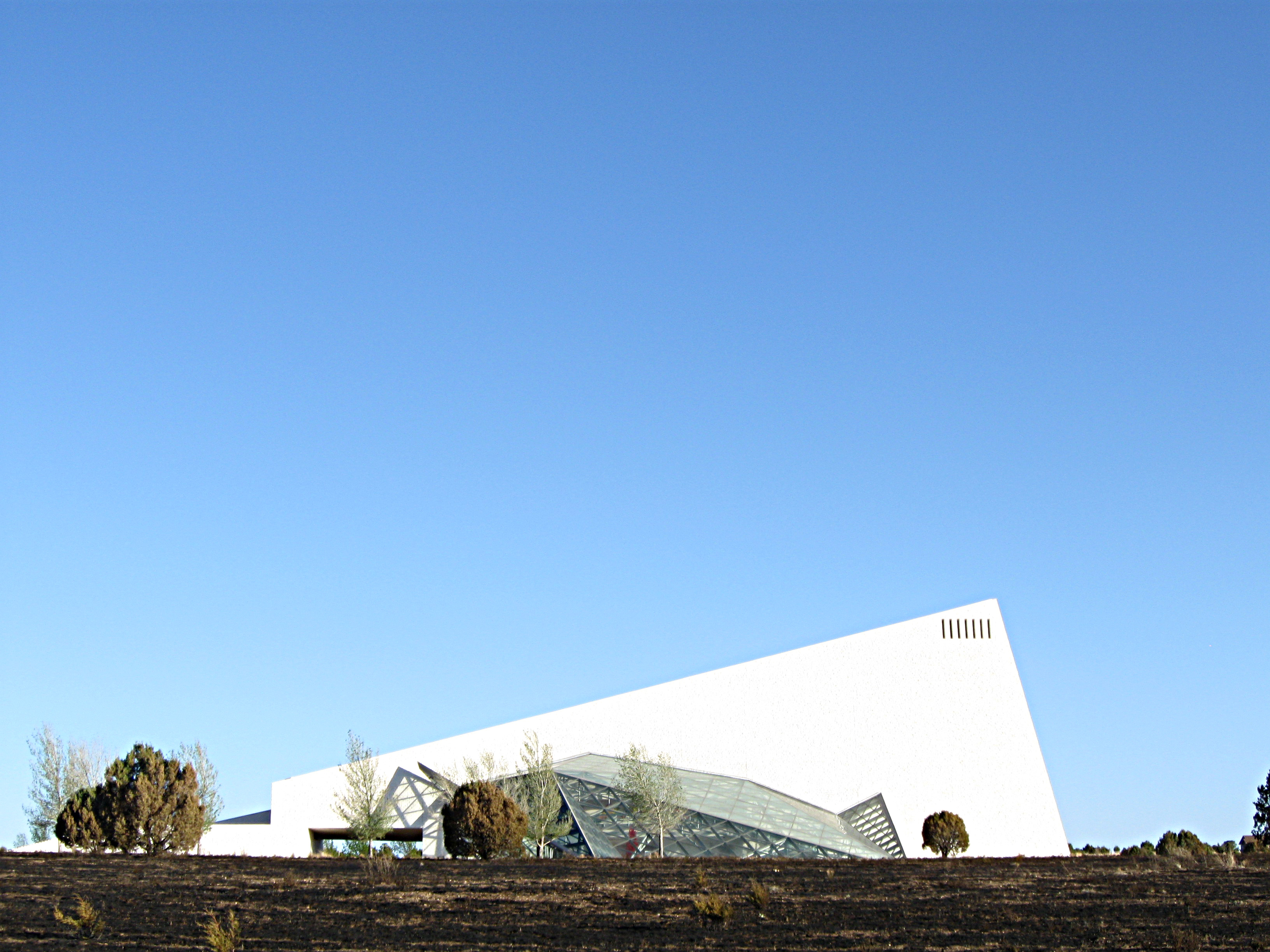
- Spencer Theater near Alto, May 2009

- Location within New Mexico Location within the United States
- Coordinates: 33°23′55″N 105°40′51″W
- Country: United States
- State: New Mexico
- County: Lincoln
- Time zone: UTC-7 (Mountain (MST))
  - Summer (DST): UTC-6 (MDT)
- ZIP code: 88312
- Area code: 575
- GNIS feature ID: 903117

Alto is an unincorporated community in Lincoln County, New Mexico, United States.

== History ==
In June 2024, due to the rapid spread of the South Fork Fire and Salt Fire, all residents of Alto were ordered to evacuate until the fire could be contained.

== Description ==
Alto is located at an elevation of 7,550 feet (2,300 m) in the Lincoln National Forest, five miles (8.0 km) north of the village of Ruidoso. Alto received its name from the Spanish word "high" because of its elevation.

Alto Lakes is a planned, residential and recreational community covering 1689+ acres along two mountain ridges in Alto. Alto Lakes was conceived and developed by Don Blaugrund beginning in 1967. The heart of the community is the Alto Lakes Golf & Country Club which includes two private 18-hole golf courses, dining, swimming and tennis facilities. Membership in the club is included with ownership of a home, town home, or lot within the community. The residential area of the community includes 1,150+ homes, 83 town homes, and approximately 1,000 vacant lots. Alto Lakes is governed by the Alto Lakes Water & Sanitation District and by the Alto Lakes Special Zoning District as well as community covenants.

== Transportation ==
=== Airports ===
- Sierra Blanca Regional Airport, located approximately 7 miles (11 km) west of Alto.

=== Major highways ===
- New Mexico State Road 48
- New Mexico State Road 220

== Notable person ==
- Elizabeth Garrett – Born in Alto.
