= Cebolla, New Mexico =

Cebolla
- Unincorporated community
- Location within the state of New Mexico Cebolla (the United States)
- Coordinates: 36°32′18″N 106°29′11″W
- Country: United States
- State: New Mexico
- County: Rio Arriba
- Elevation: 7,641 ft (2,329 m)
- Time zone: UTC-7 (Mountain (MST))
  - Summer (DST): UTC-6 (MDT)
- Area code: 575
- GNIS feature ID: 923578

Cebolla is an unincorporated community in Rio Arriba County, New Mexico. Cebolla is located on U.S. Route 84, 44 miles (71 km) northwest of Española. Cebolla has a post office with ZIP code 87518.

== History ==
Cebolla was settled around 1800 and named after the valley. Sheep that grazed in the valley were fond of eating the wild onions, and shepherds dubbed it El Valle de Cebolla. The Rio Cebolla flows through the village.
