= New Mexico State Road 48 =

State highway in New Mexico, United States

State Road 48
- NM 48 highlighted in red

Route information
- Maintained by NMDOT
- Length: 22.140 mi (35.631 km)

Major junctions
- South end: US 70 in Hollywood
- NM 37 in Angus
- North end: US 380 in Capitan

Location
- Country: United States
- State: New Mexico
- Counties: Lincoln

Highway system
- New Mexico State Highway System; Interstate; US; State; Scenic
← NM 47	→ NM 50

State Road 48 (NM 48) is a 22.140-mile-long (35.631 km) state highway that runs north–south through the Sacramento Mountains, which are part of the Lincoln National Forest in Lincoln County, New Mexico in the United States. NM 48's southern terminus is at U.S. Route 70 (US 70) in the Hollywood neighborhood of Ruidoso, and the northern terminus is at US 380 in Capitan. NM 37 intersects this highway in Angus.

== Route description ==
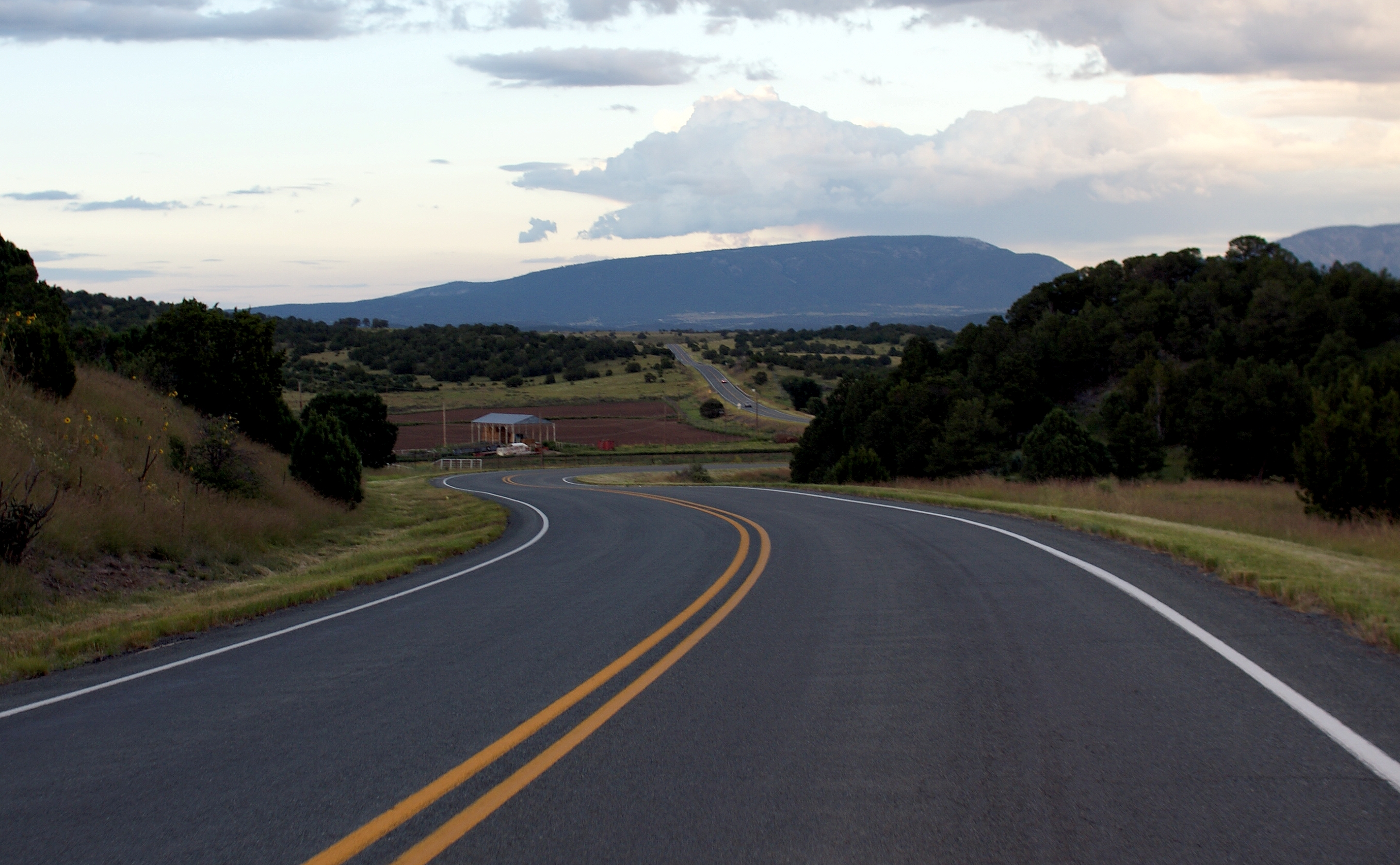
NM 48 northbound, slightly south of Capitan

NM 48 begins at an intersection with US 70 in Hollywood and begins traveling northward. It then reaches an intersection with NM 37 in Angus. It ends at its northern terminus at US 380 in Capitan.

== Major intersections ==
The entire route is in Lincoln County.

Location	mi	km	Destinations	Notes
Ruidoso	0.000	0.000	US 70	Southern terminus
Alto	8.810	14.178	NM 532 west	Eastern terminus of NM 532
Alto	10.700	17.220	NM 220 east	Western terminus of NM 220
Angus	12.976	20.883	NM 37 north	Southern terminus of NM 37
Capitan	22.140	35.631	US 380	Northern terminus
1.000 mi = 1.609 km; 1.000 km = 0.621 mi
