= Corona, New Mexico =

- Village
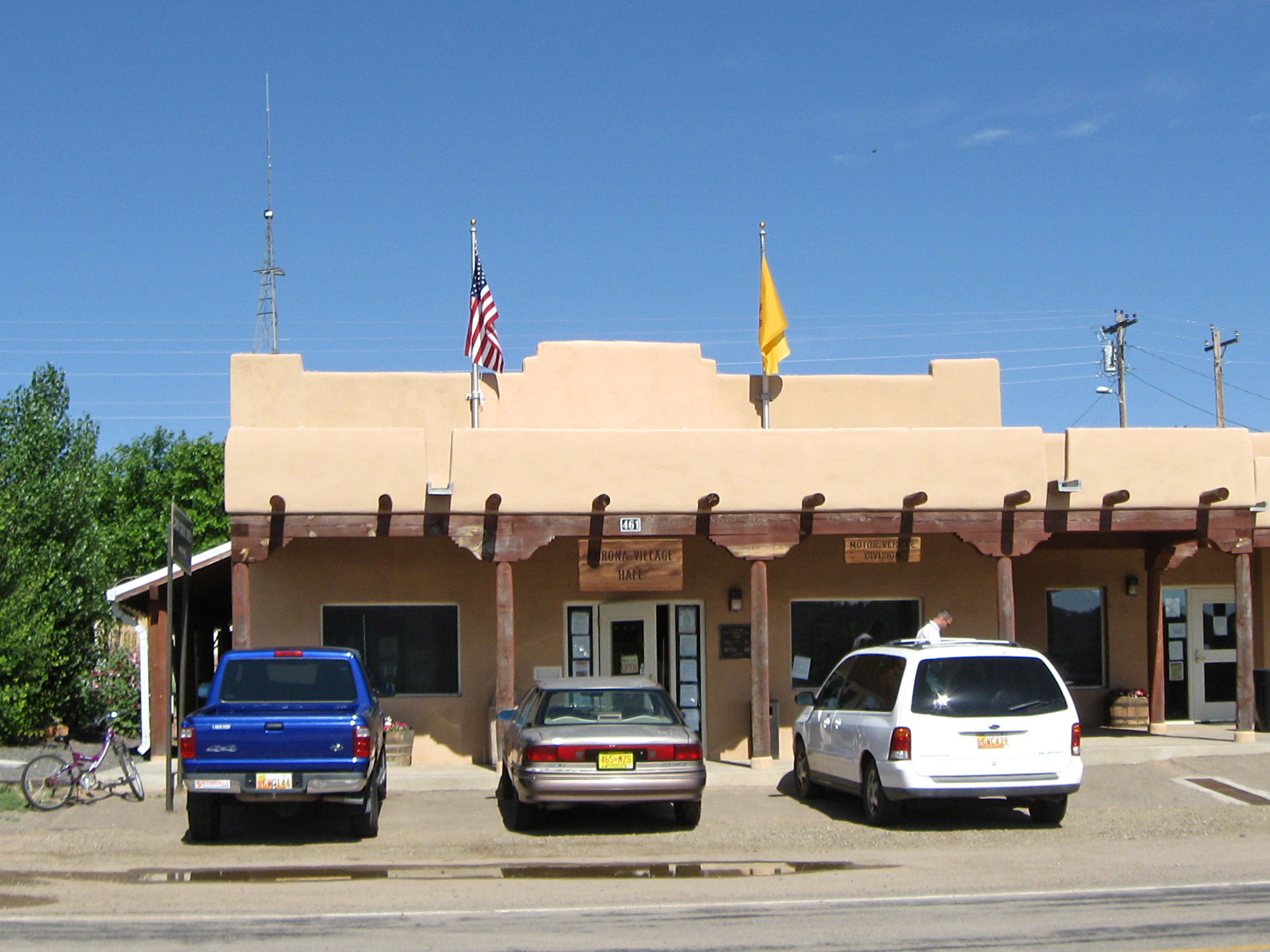
- Corona Village Hall

- Location of Corona, New Mexico

- Location in the United States
- Coordinates: 34°14′52″N 105°35′49″W
- Country: United States
- State: New Mexico
- County: Lincoln

Area
  - Total: 1.03 sq mi (2.66 km^{2})
  - Land: 1.03 sq mi (2.66 km^{2})
  - Water: 0 sq mi (0.00 km^{2})
- Elevation: 6,693 ft (2,040 m)

Population (2020)
  - Total: 129
  - Density: 125.7/sq mi (48.54/km^{2})
- Time zone: UTC-7 (Mountain (MST))
  - Summer (DST): UTC-6 (MDT)
- ZIP code: 88318
- Area code: 505
- FIPS code: 35-17680
- GNIS feature ID: 2413543
- Website: villageofcorona.com

Corona is a village in Lincoln County, New Mexico, United States, located along U.S. Route 54. The population was 129 at the 2020 census.

== History ==
Corona is the closest populated community to a purported UFO crash in 1947, approximately 30 miles (48 km) to the southeast. The rancher who found the crash first came to Corona to report it to a few residents, before going to Roswell to tell officials there.

The highest point on the route of the famed Golden State passenger train, operated by the Southern Pacific Railroad, was just south of Corona.

In 2004, Corona was the site of a 5,280 acres (21.4 km^{2}) forest fire, begun when an unknown arsonist lit a pile of pine needles.

== Geography ==
According to the United States Census Bureau, the village has a total area of 1.0 square mile (2.6 km^{2}), all land.

== Demographics ==
Historical population
Census	Pop.	Note	%±
1950	530		—
1960	420		−20.8%
1970	262		−37.6%
1980	236		−9.9%
1990	215		−8.9%
2000	165		−23.3%
2010	172		4.2%
2020	129		−25.0%
U.S. Decennial Census

At the 2000 census, there were 165 people, 81 households, and 46 families in the village. The population density was 161.4 inhabitants per square mile (62.3/km^{2}). There were 118 housing units at an average density of 115.4 per square mile (44.6/km^{2}). The racial makeup of the village was 73.33% White, 3.64% Native American, 18.18% from other races, and 4.85% from two or more races. Hispanic or Latino of any race were 42.42%.

Of the 81 households, 23.5% had children under the age of 18 living with them, 44.4% were married couples living together, 8.6% had a female householder with no husband present, and 43.2% were non-families. 37.0% of households were one person and 14.8% were one person aged 65 or older. The average household size was 2.04 and the average family size was 2.61.

The age distribution was 20.6% under the age of 18, 6.1% from 18 to 24, 23.0% from 25 to 44, 30.3% from 45 to 64, and 20.0% 65 or older. The median age was 46 years. For every 100 females, there were 70.1 males. For every 100 females age 18 and over, there were 74.7 males.

The median household income was $28,594 and the median family income was $33,438. Males had a median income of $22,386 versus $14,375 for females. The per capita income for the village was $34,987. About 6.2% of families and 9.5% of the population were below the poverty line, including 20.8% of those under the age of eighteen and none of those sixty five or over.

== See also ==
- List of municipalities in New Mexico
