= Lincoln County, New Mexico =

County in New Mexico, United States

- County
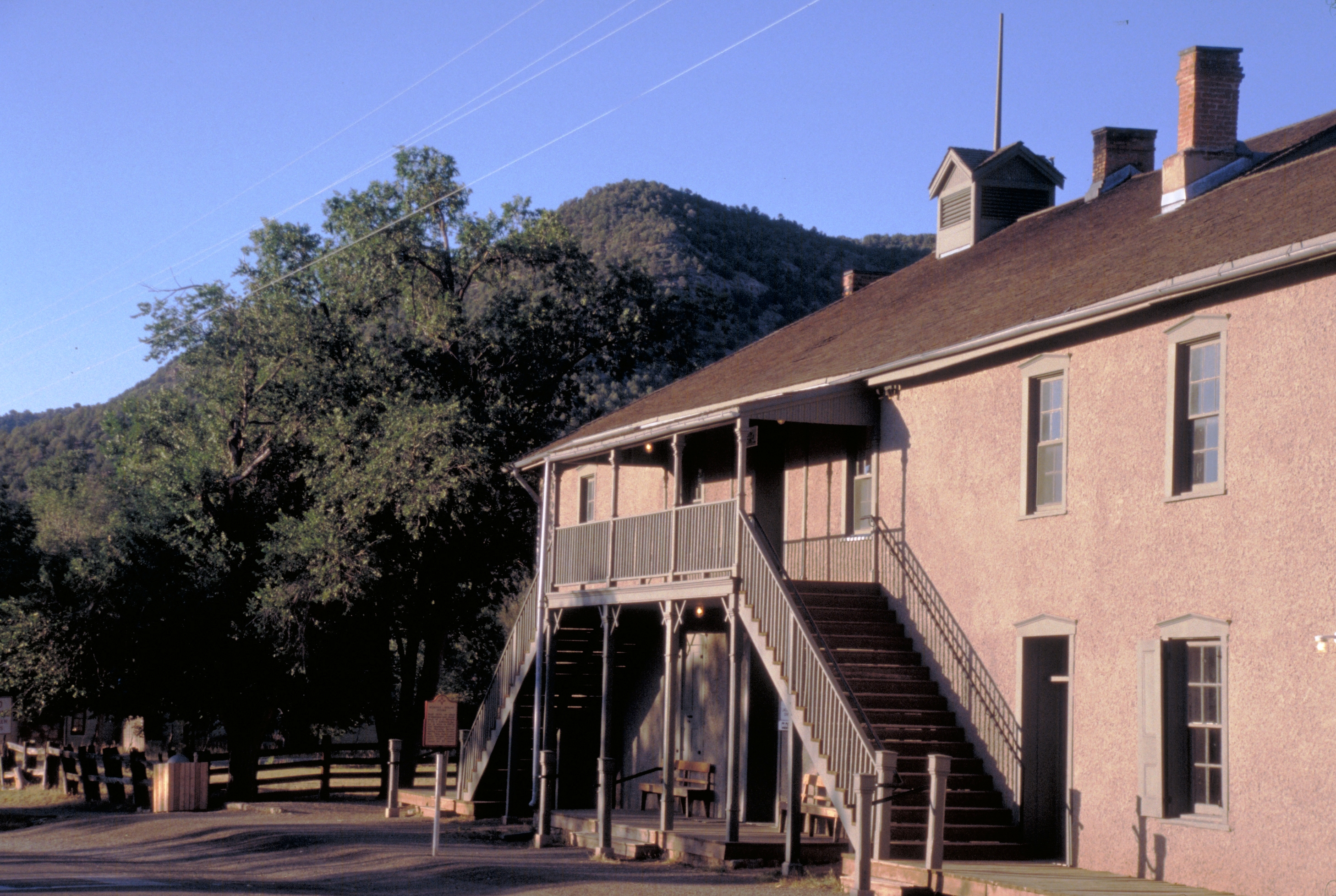
- Old Lincoln County courthouse in Lincoln

- Seal

- Location within the U.S. state of New Mexico
- Coordinates: 33°44′N 105°28′W
- Country: United States
- State: New Mexico
- Founded: 1869
- Named for: Abraham Lincoln
- Seat: Carrizozo
- Largest village: Ruidoso

Area
  - Total: 4,831 sq mi (12,510 km^{2})
  - Land: 4,831 sq mi (12,510 km^{2})
  - Water: 0.2 sq mi (0.52 km^{2}) 0.0%

Population (2020)
  - Total: 20,269
  - Estimate (2025): 19,844 ▼
  - Density: 4.2/sq mi (1.6/km^{2})
- Time zone: UTC−7 (Mountain)
  - Summer (DST): UTC−6 (MDT)
- Congressional district: 1st
- Website: www.lincolncountynm.gov

Lincoln County is a county in the U.S. state of New Mexico. As of the 2020 census, the population was 20,269. Its county seat is Carrizozo, while its largest community is Ruidoso.

== History ==
Prior to the creation of Lincoln County, the Mescalero Apache occupied this region. They were confined to a reservation near Fort Stanton in 1873 and to their present reservation, only partly in Lincoln County, in 1883. Much of the commerce of late-19th century Lincoln County consisted of government contracts to provide food and other commodities to the Mescalero and to the soldiers at Fort Stanton. Hispanics from northern New Mexico began moving into the region in the 1850s.

Lincoln County was named in honor of President Abraham Lincoln. The county was created in 1869 when Soccoro County was divided into two with Lincoln county in the east. At the time, it was the largest county in area in the United States. The county boundaries were often modified and reduced until 1909 when the present-day boundaries were established.

In the late 1870s, the Lincoln County War began between ranchers and the owners of the county's largest general store. William Bonney, better known as Billy the Kid, became involved on the side of the ranchers after his friend and employer was killed. In the end, Bonney killed the county sheriff, a deputy, and the deputy that killed his friend. Several other people were slain in the conflict, which included the other leader of the rancher faction. His death ended the conflict. In 1878, the new territorial governor, retired Union General Lew Wallace, offered amnesty to the combatants to bring a long-lasting truce between the factions.

Most of the population is in the Greater Ruidoso Area. The town of Carrizozo serves as the county seat and is in the Tularosa Basin northwest of Ruidoso. Ruidoso boasts several small suburbs and neighbor communities including Ruidoso Downs, Hollywood, Mescalero, and Alto which contribute to the Ruidoso Micropolitan Statistical Area's population of 21,224. Ruidoso serves as the second largest city in south central New Mexico behind Alamogordo which is 46 miles southwest of the village. Ruidoso Downs on the southern end of the county and southeast of Ruidoso operates the Ruidoso Downs Racetrack and Casino. The track hosts both thoroughbred and quarter horse racing, notably the All American Futurity, the richest in quarter horse racing. Historical figures from Lincoln County include Billy the Kid and Smokey Bear, whose names help drive the tourism trade that is heavily popularized within the county.

== Geography ==
According to the U.S. Census Bureau, the county has a total area of 4,831 square miles (12,510 km^{2}), virtually all of which is land.

=== Adjacent counties ===
- Torrance County – north
- Guadalupe County – north
- De Baca County – northeast
- Chaves County – east
- Otero County – south
- Sierra County – southwest
- Socorro County – west

=== National protected areas ===
- Cibola National Forest (part)
- Fort Stanton – Snowy River Cave National Conservation Area
- Lincoln National Forest (part)

== Demographics ==
Historical population
Census	Pop.	Note	%±
1870	1,803		—
1880	2,513		39.4%
1890	7,081		181.8%
1900	4,958		−30.0%
1910	7,822		57.8%
1920	7,823		0.0%
1930	7,198		−8.0%
1940	8,557		18.9%
1950	7,409		−13.4%
1960	7,744		4.5%
1970	7,560		−2.4%
1980	10,997		45.5%
1990	12,219		11.1%
2000	19,411		58.9%
2010	20,497		5.6%
2020	20,269		−1.1%
2025 (est.)	19,844	▼	−2.1%
U.S. Decennial Census; 1790–1960 1900–1990; 1990–2000 2010

=== 2020 census ===
As of the 2020 census, the county had a population of 20,269. The median age was 53.0 years, 17.7% of residents were under the age of 18, and 29.7% of residents were 65 years of age or older. For every 100 females there were 96.0 males, and for every 100 females age 18 and over there were 93.7 males age 18 and over.

Lincoln County, New Mexico – Racial and ethnic composition Note: the US Census treats Hispanic/Latino as an ethnic category. This table excludes Latinos from the racial categories and assigns them to a separate category. Hispanics/Latinos may be of any race.
Race / Ethnicity (NH = Non-Hispanic)	Pop 2000	Pop 2010	Pop 2020	% 2000	% 2010	% 2020
White alone (NH)	13,763	13,600	12,339	70.90%	66.35%	60.88%
Black or African American alone (NH)	47	74	68	0.24%	0.36%	0.34%
Native American or Alaska Native alone (NH)	317	407	429	1.63%	1.99%	2.12%
Asian alone (NH)	48	67	138	0.25%	0.33%	0.68%
Pacific Islander alone (NH)	7	5	8	0.04%	0.02%	0.04%
Other race alone (NH)	29	24	137	0.15%	0.12%	0.68%
Mixed race or Multiracial (NH)	225	210	654	1.16%	1.02%	3.23%
Hispanic or Latino (any race)	4,975	6,110	6,496	25.63%	29.81%	32.05%
Total	19,411	20,497	20,269	100.00%	100.00%	100.00%

The racial makeup of the county was 70.4% White, 0.4% Black or African American, 2.9% American Indian and Alaska Native, 0.8% Asian, 0.1% Native Hawaiian and Pacific Islander, 9.7% from some other race, and 15.7% from two or more races. Hispanic or Latino residents of any race comprised 32.0% of the population.

54.5% of residents lived in urban areas, while 45.5% lived in rural areas.

There were 9,148 households in the county, of which 21.5% had children under the age of 18 living with them and 27.6% had a female householder with no spouse or partner present. About 32.3% of all households were made up of individuals and 17.2% had someone living alone who was 65 years of age or older.

There were 17,624 housing units, of which 48.1% were vacant. Among occupied housing units, 76.1% were owner-occupied and 23.9% were renter-occupied. The homeowner vacancy rate was 3.8% and the rental vacancy rate was 25.2%.

=== 2010 census ===
As of the 2010 census, there were 20,497 people, 9,219 households, and 5,859 families living in the county. The population density was 4.2 inhabitants per square mile (1.6/km^{2}). There were 17,519 housing units at an average density of 3.6 units per square mile (1.4 units/km^{2}). The racial makeup of the county was 85.1% white, 2.4% American Indian, 0.5% black or African American, 0.4% Asian, 9.2% from other races, and 2.5% from two or more races. Those of Hispanic or Latino origin made up 29.8% of the population. In terms of ancestry, 17.0% were Irish, 15.6% were German, 12.3% were English, and 4.8% were American.

Of the 9,219 households, 23.3% had children under the age of 18 living with them, 49.5% were married couples living together, 9.8% had a female householder with no husband present, 36.4% were non-families, and 30.5% of all households were made up of individuals. The average household size was 2.21 and the average family size was 2.72. The median age was 49.4 years.

The median income for a household in the county was $43,750 and the median income for a family was $53,871. Males had a median income of $34,306 versus $29,836 for females. The per capita income for the county was $24,290. About 8.1% of families and 12.9% of the population were below the poverty line, including 20.7% of those under age 18 and 7.8% of those age 65 or over.

=== 2000 census ===
As of the 2000 census, there were 19,411 people, 8,202 households, and 5,634 families living in the county. The population density was 4 people per square mile (1.5 people/km^{2}). There were 15,298 housing units at an average density of 3 units per square mile (1.2/km^{2}). The racial makeup of the county was 83.60% White, 0.35% Black or African American, 1.95% Native American, 0.27% Asian, 0.06% Pacific Islander, 11.28% from other races, and 2.48% from two or more races. 25.63% of the population were Hispanic or Latino of any race.

There were 8,202 households, out of which 26.20% had children under the age of 18 living with them, 55.60% were married couples living together, 9.30% had a female householder with no husband present, and 31.30% were non-families. 26.70% of all households were made up of individuals, and 10.00% had someone living alone who was 65 years of age or older. The average household size was 2.34 and the average family size was 2.80.

In the county, the population was spread out, with 22.70% under the age of 18, 6.00% from 18 to 24, 23.20% from 25 to 44, 30.20% from 45 to 64, and 17.90% who were 65 years of age or older. The median age was 44 years. For every 100 females there were 95.90 males. For every 100 females age 18 and over, there were 93.30 males.

The median income for a household in the county was $33,886, and the median income for a family was $40,035. Males had a median income of $27,323 versus $19,923 for females. The per capita income for the county was $19,338. About 10.80% of families and 14.90% of the population were below the poverty line, including 24.70% of those under age 18 and 8.70% of those age 65 or over.

== Communities ==
=== City ===
- Ruidoso Downs

=== Town ===
- Carrizozo (county seat)

=== Villages ===
- Capitan
- Corona
- Ruidoso

=== Census-designated place ===
- Bluewater
- Nogal

=== Other communities ===
- Alto
- Arabela
- Coyote
- Glencoe
- Hondo
- Lincoln
- Oscuro
- Picacho
- Riverside
- San Patricio
- Tinnie

=== Ghost towns ===
- Jicarilla
- Placitas
- White Oaks

== Politics ==
Lincoln County is overwhelmingly Republican, voting Democratic in just three elections since New Mexico's founding (1912, 1932, 1936). It was one of only three counties in the state to support Barry Goldwater of neighboring Arizona in 1964, which is also the last time a Democrat managed even 40 percent of the county's vote.

United States presidential election results for Lincoln County, New Mexico
Year	Republican		Democratic		Third party(ies)	
Year	No.	%	No.	%	No.	%
1912	452	40.11%	461	40.91%	214	18.99%
1916	889	49.50%	863	48.05%	44	2.45%
1920	1,456	57.32%	1,047	41.22%	37	1.46%
1924	1,087	49.05%	837	37.77%	292	13.18%
1928	1,489	64.32%	821	35.46%	5	0.22%
1932	1,172	34.29%	2,225	65.10%	21	0.61%
1936	1,579	43.37%	2,021	55.51%	41	1.13%
1940	1,794	50.25%	1,763	49.38%	13	0.36%
1944	1,455	51.95%	1,342	47.91%	4	0.14%
1948	1,575	52.41%	1,406	46.79%	24	0.80%
1952	2,004	64.52%	1,095	35.25%	7	0.23%
1956	1,956	64.77%	1,059	35.07%	5	0.17%
1960	2,042	58.29%	1,459	41.65%	2	0.06%
1964	1,761	52.55%	1,565	46.70%	25	0.75%
1968	2,004	64.52%	802	25.82%	300	9.66%
1972	2,528	77.07%	696	21.22%	56	1.71%
1976	2,320	61.64%	1,415	37.59%	29	0.77%
1980	3,009	68.79%	1,127	25.77%	238	5.44%
1984	3,992	77.04%	1,134	21.88%	56	1.08%
1988	3,511	66.40%	1,690	31.96%	87	1.65%
1992	2,669	45.57%	1,730	29.54%	1,458	24.89%
1996	3,396	52.97%	2,209	34.46%	806	12.57%
2000	4,458	65.83%	2,027	29.93%	287	4.24%
2004	6,070	67.34%	2,822	31.31%	122	1.35%
2008	6,001	61.89%	3,535	36.46%	160	1.65%
2012	5,961	64.50%	2,942	31.83%	339	3.67%
2016	5,896	66.23%	2,331	26.19%	675	7.58%
2020	6,942	67.36%	3,194	30.99%	170	1.65%
2024	6,942	68.29%	3,033	29.84%	190	1.87%

== Education ==
School districts include:

- Capitan Municipal Schools
- Carrizozo Municipal Schools
- Corona Municipal Schools
- Hondo Valley Public Schools
- Ruidoso Municipal Schools

== Transportation ==
=== Major highways ===
- US 54
- US 70
- US 285
- US 380
- NM 37
- NM 42
- NM 48
- NM 55
- NM 220
- NM 246
- NM 247
- NM 349
- NM 368
- NM 462
- NM 532

== See also ==
- National Register of Historic Places listings in Lincoln County, New Mexico
