= Sierra Blanca Regional Airport =

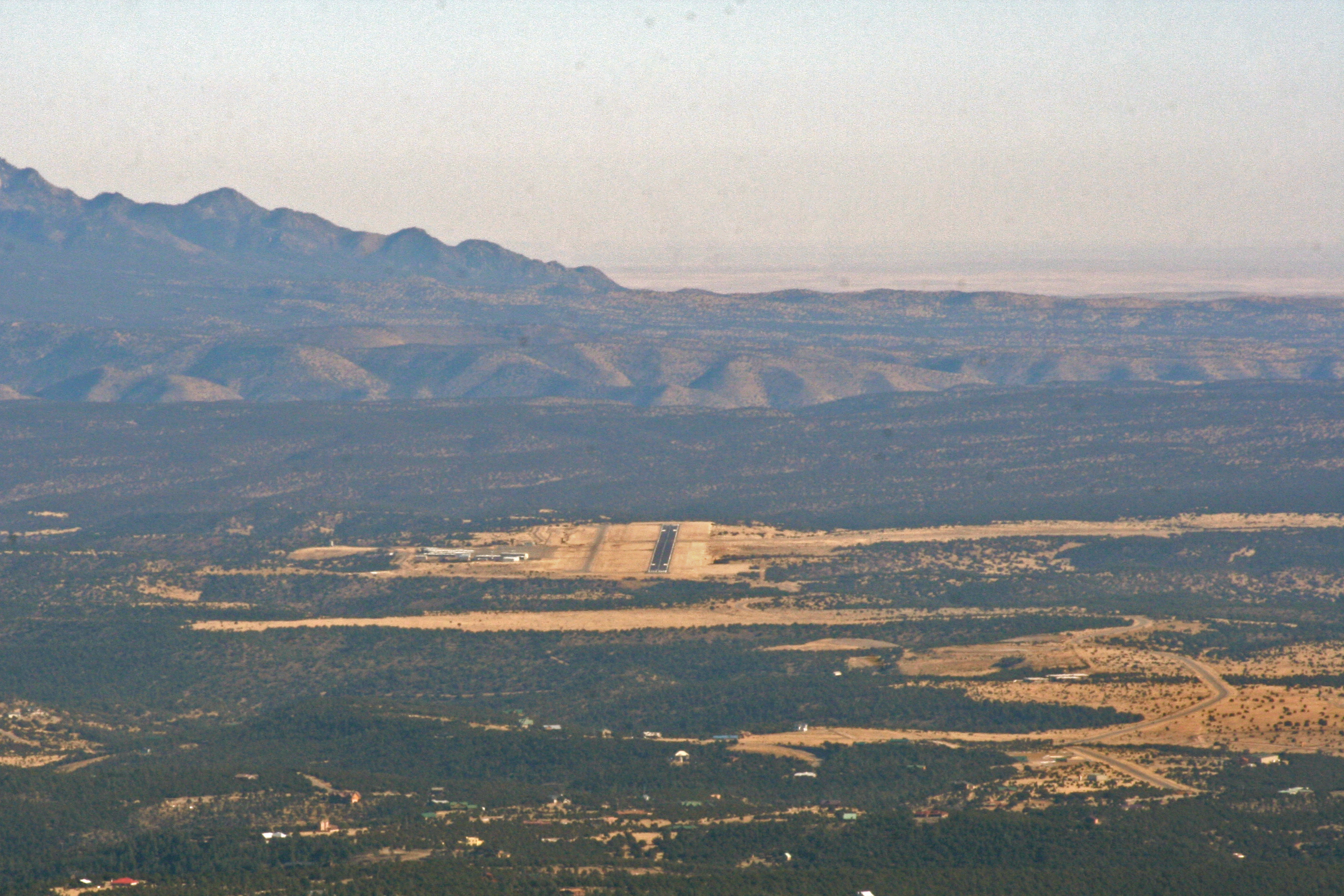
- IATA: RUI; ICAO: KSRR; FAA LID: SRR

Summary
- Airport type: Public
- Owner: Village of Ruidoso
- Serves: Ruidoso, New Mexico
- Elevation AMSL: 6,814 ft / 2,077 m
- Coordinates: 33°27′46″N 105°32′05″W
- Interactive map of Sierra Blanca Regional Airport

Runways
Direction	Length		Surface
Direction	ft	m	Surface
6/24	8,120	2,475	Asphalt
12/30	6,309	1,923	Asphalt

Statistics (2022)
- Aircraft operations (year ending 12/8/2022): 14,278
- Based aircraft: 7
- Source: Federal Aviation Administration

Sierra Blanca Regional Airport (IATA: RUI, ICAO: KSRR, FAA LID: SRR) is a public use airport located on the Fort Stanton mesa 15 nautical miles (28 km) northeast of the central business district of Ruidoso, a village in Lincoln County, New Mexico, United States. It is owned by the Village of Ruidoso. According to the FAA's National Plan of Integrated Airport Systems for 2009–2013, it is classified as a general aviation airport.

== Facilities and aircraft ==
Sierra Blanca Regional Airport covers an area of 1,665 acres (674 ha) at an elevation of 6,814 feet (2,077 m) above mean sea level. It has two asphalt paved runways: 6/24 is 8,120 by 100 feet (2,475 x 30 m) and 12/30 is 6,309 by 75 feet (1,923 x 23 m).

For the 12-month period ending December 8, 2022, the airport had 14,278 aircraft operations, an average of 39 per day: 68% general aviation, 24% military, 7% air taxi, and <1% commercial. At that time there were seven aircraft based at this airport: six single-engine, and one jet.

== History ==
The Sierra Blanca Regional Airport opened on December 11, 1987. It was built to replace the much smaller Ruidoso airport which was located within the city of Ruidoso and had seen many accidents due to its location in a mountain valley.

Ruidoso was served by several commuter airlines between 1976 and 2008 with flights to Albuquerque, El Paso, Midland/Odessa, and Dallas/Ft. Worth (DFW). These carriers used such commuter aircraft as the Piper Navajo, Cessna 208 Caravan, Beechcraft 1300, and the Swearingen Metroliner. Among these airlines were: Roswell Airlines (1976-1978), Airways of New Mexico (1978-1979), Wise Airlines (1984), Mesa Airlines (1987-1990), Air Ruidoso (1987-1989), Lone Star Airlines (1995-1997), Rio Grande Air (2001), and Pacific Wings, dba New Mexico Airlines (2008).

Lone Star Airlines briefly operated a 32-seat Dornier 328 propjet in 1995 with a flight to DFW that stopped in Roswell. In 2005 American Eagle Airlines announced its intent to serve the airport with nonstop regional jets to DFW on behalf of American Airlines; however, this service did not materialize and the city of Ruidoso later joined into a consortium with other cities in southeastern New Mexico to have American Eagle serve Roswell, New Mexico via the Roswell International Air Center (ROW) airport located 70 miles to the east.

== Airline and Destination ==
Airlines	Destinations	Refs
Contour Airlines	Denver	
