= Ruidoso, New Mexico =

City in New Mexico, United States

- Village
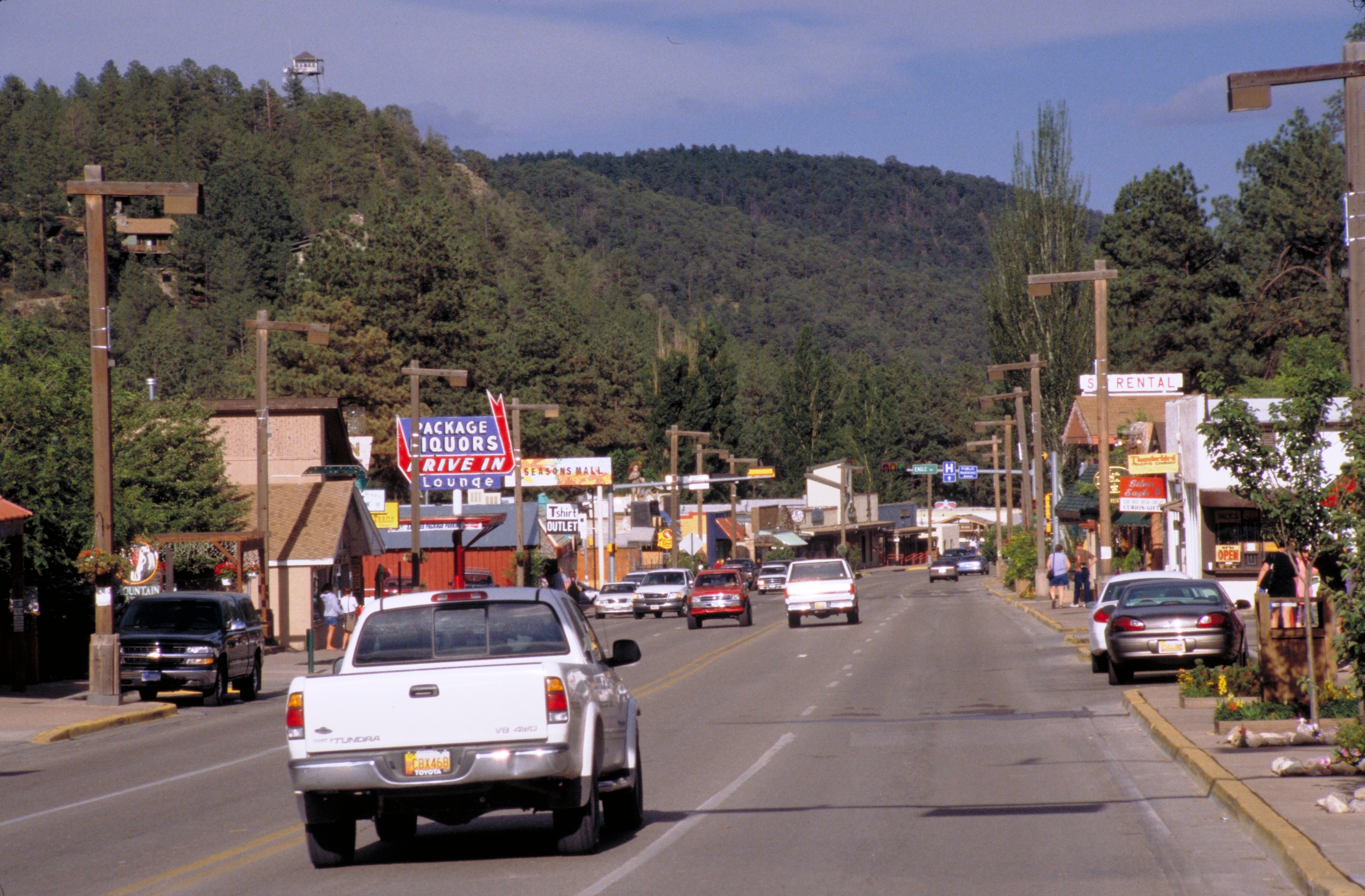
- Downtown Ruidoso (2006)

- Location of Ruidoso, New Mexico
- Coordinates: 33°20′37″N 105°39′54″W
- Country: United States
- State: New Mexico
- County: Lincoln

Government
  - Mayor: Lynn Crawford

Area
  - Total: 16.15 sq mi (41.83 km^{2})
  - Land: 16.13 sq mi (41.78 km^{2})
  - Water: 0.019 sq mi (0.05 km^{2})
- Elevation: 6,739 ft (2,054 m)

Population (2020)
  - Total: 7,679
  - Density: 476.0/sq mi (183.78/km^{2})
- Time zone: UTC−7 (Mountain)
  - Summer (DST): UTC−6 (Mountain)
- ZIP codes: 88345, 88355
- Area code: 575
- FIPS code: 35-65210
- GNIS ID: 2413585
- Website: ruidoso-nm.gov

Ruidoso (Spanish for "noisy") is a village in Lincoln County, New Mexico, United States, adjacent to the Lincoln National Forest. The population was 7,679 at the 2020 census. The city of Ruidoso Downs and the unincorporated area of Alto are suburbs of Ruidoso, and contribute to the Ruidoso Micropolitan Statistical Area's population of 21,223.

A mountain resort town, Ruidoso lies in the Sierra Blanca mountain range of south-central New Mexico, where it merges with the Sacramento Mountains to the south. Ruidoso is a resort community close to the slopes of Ski Apache, the Mescalero Apache Tribe-owned ski resort on Sierra Blanca, an almost 12,000-foot (3,700 m) mountain. The tribe also operates the Inn of the Mountain Gods resort in the area, which includes a casino, hotel, arcade room and golf course. Ruidoso is the largest community in Lincoln County, and serves as the regional economic hub.

In recent years the village is contending with serious questions about the adequacy of the local water supply and zoning enforcement. As in many small communities that have been recently "discovered", there is an ongoing debate about how best to plan for additional growth.

The village received its name from the Rio Ruidoso (Spanish for "Noisy River"), a small stream that weaves through the city.

== History ==
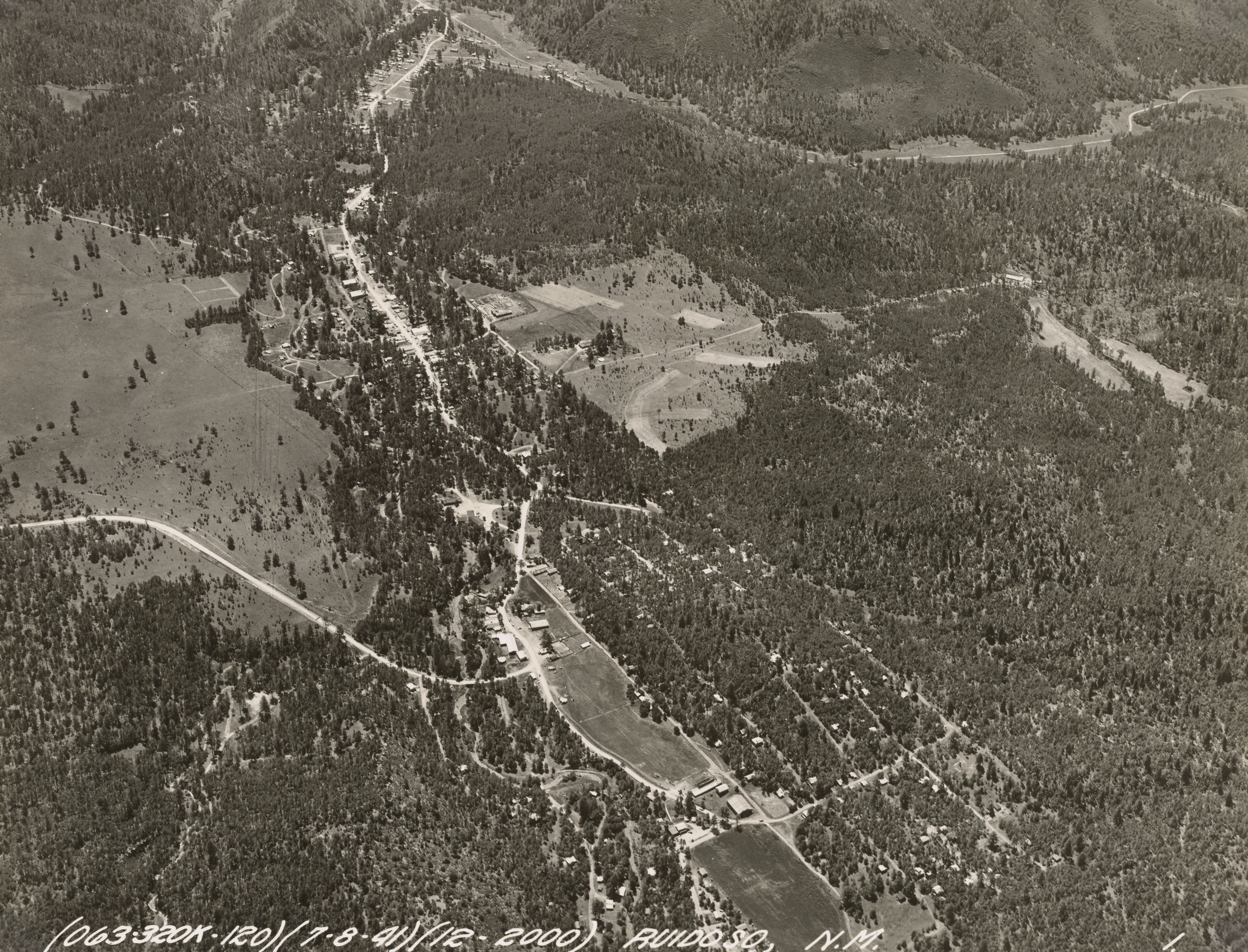
Aerial image of Ruidoso, 1941

Along the eastern foothills of White Mountain, retired army Captain Paul Dowlin built Dowlin’s Mill where the Carrizo Creek and Rio Ruidoso merge. He had served at nearby Fort Stanton. The Mill was also a general store, dance hall, and moonshine supply.

San Patricio, New Mexico (in the Hondo Valley) was originally known as Ruidoso. In 1875, its name was changed in honor of a Catholic priest’s patron saint. Early Hispanos used the term “Ruidoso” to describe a noisy creek. Today’s Ruidoso grew up around Dowlin’s Mill. Will Dowlin survived his brother, after an employee shot Captain Paul dead.

By 1885, with a general store, blacksmith, post office, cabins along the Rio Ruidoso, and proximity to the Chisholm Trail Ruidoso, NM was born.

The Wingfield family operated a dairy and early post office. By 1914, cabins were being built in Upper Canyon. At Cedar Creek in 1935, a ski area opened on a sloping meadow.

On July 16, 1945, the Trinity Test could be felt by local people like an explosion.

By 1947, a race track was opened at Hollywood Park. Visitors played golf in the Gateway area. Finally, in 1963 the Mescalero Apaches purchased the ski area now known as Ski Apache.

=== 21st century ===
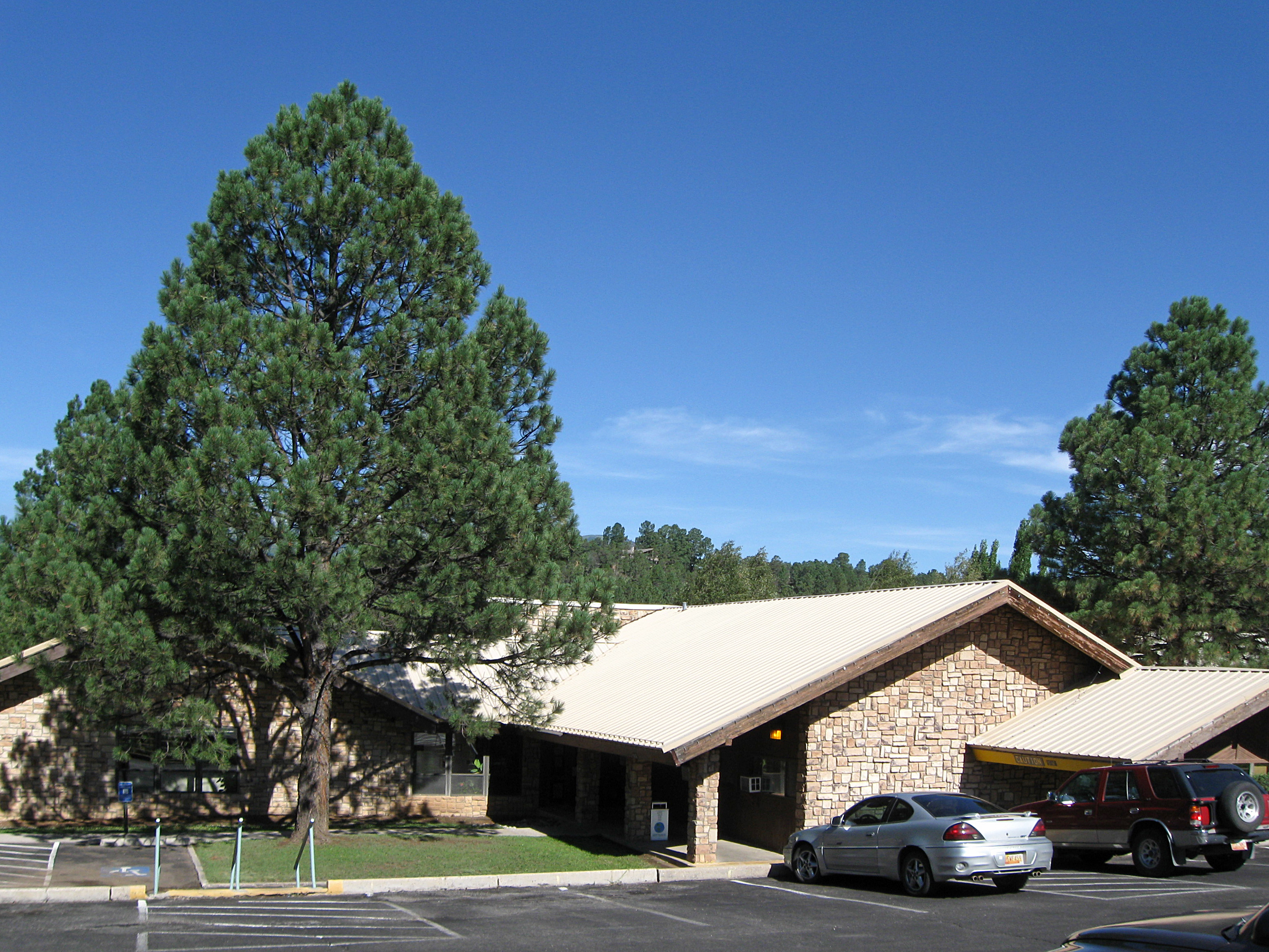
Ruidoso Village Hall

In December 2006, seven percent of eligible voters approved a $12.6 million bond issue to finance the expansion and modernization of the local wastewater treatment plant which was built in 1982. In 2011, construction was completed on a $36 million wastewater treatment plant. This state-of-the-art facility utilizes membrane technology to achieve discharge standards within regulatory guidelines. The plant was designed to accommodate future growth. The average daily volume is 1.6 million gallons. The plant can currently process up to 2.7 million gallons per day.

Late at night on July 26, 2008, through July 27, 2008, the town and the river were hit by devastating flash flooding. The remnant circulation of Hurricane Dolly passed over the area and brought as much as 9 inches (229 mm) of rainfall. Hundreds of tourists, campers and residents were evacuated and the storm caused damage at the Ruidoso Downs Race Track. One person was killed in the flooding, approximately 900 persons required rescue, approximately 500 structures were damaged, and initial damage estimates for Ruidoso were in the range of $15– 20 million.

In March 2016, the village of Ruidoso entered into a Sister City relationship with Puerto Peñasco, Sonora, Mexico.

In April 2022, large parts of Ruidoso were threatened by the McBride Fire; over 200 structures were destroyed and two people were killed by the blaze, fueled by intense dryness and strong winds.

The Christmas Classic (2023), with Malin Akerman and Ryan Hansen, was filmed at Ski Apache, Alto, and Rio Ruidoso.

In June 2024, following the rapid spread of the South Fork Fire and Salt Fire, all 7,000 residents were ordered by officials to evacuate the village. Two people have been confirmed dead. As of July 3, 2024, the fires were at 87 percent and 84 percent containment respectively. Following the fires, regular floods led to further evacuations, but members of the village have returned to rebuild the community.

== Geography ==
Ruidoso is in southern Lincoln County, with elevations ranging from 6,400 feet (2,000 m) at the village's southeast corner in the valley of the Rio Ruidoso up to over 7,700 feet (2,300 m) at the village's northern end near Alto. Ruidoso's southern border and westernmost border follow the Otero County line. The village is bordered to the east by the city of Ruidoso Downs. U.S. Route 70 passes through the southeast part of the village, following the valley of Carrizo Creek upstream from the Rio Ruidoso. The highway leads east down the valley of the Rio Ruidoso and Rio Hondo 70 miles (110 km) to Roswell and southwest over Apache Summit 33 miles (53 km) to Tularosa. New Mexico State Road 48 passes through the center of Ruidoso on Sudderth Drive, the village's main street, and leads north 18 miles (29 km) to Capitan.

According to the U.S. Census Bureau, the village has a total area of 16.1 square miles (41.7 km^{2}), of which 0.02 square miles (0.05 km^{2}), or 0.12 percent are water.

=== Climate ===
According to the Köppen-Geiger climate classification system, Ruidoso has a Subtropical highland climate (Cfb) due to its moderate temperature ranges and precipitation throughout the year. Bi-modal precipitation falls as rain during summer monsoon and as winter snow. Snowfall varies highly by the year.

Climate data for RUIDOSO, NM (1991-2020 normals, extremes 1941-)
Month	Jan	Feb	Mar	Apr	May	Jun	Jul	Aug	Sep	Oct	Nov	Dec	Year
Record high °F (°C)	74 (23)	74 (23)	78 (26)	85 (29)	92 (33)	98 (37)	95 (35)	92 (33)	91 (33)	84 (29)	77 (25)	73 (23)	98 (37)
Mean daily maximum °F (°C)	48.8 (9.3)	51.0 (10.6)	57.5 (14.2)	64.9 (18.3)	72.8 (22.7)	81.6 (27.6)	81.2 (27.3)	78.5 (25.8)	74.8 (23.8)	66.7 (19.3)	55.7 (13.2)	48.4 (9.1)	65.2 (18.4)
Mean daily minimum °F (°C)	20.6 (−6.3)	23.2 (−4.9)	27.0 (−2.8)	32.7 (0.4)	40.3 (4.6)	47.3 (8.5)	51.2 (10.7)	50.3 (10.2)	44.3 (6.8)	35.3 (1.8)	26.1 (−3.3)	21.5 (−5.8)	35.0 (1.7)
Record low °F (°C)	−26 (−32)	−27 (−33)	−8 (−22)	2 (−17)	11 (−12)	22 (−6)	31 (−1)	31 (−1)	21 (−6)	5 (−15)	−19 (−28)	−24 (−31)	−27 (−33)
Average precipitation inches (mm)	1.11 (28)	1.03 (26)	0.88 (22)	0.67 (17)	1.16 (29)	2.05 (52)	4.31 (109)	4.23 (107)	2.49 (63)	1.69 (43)	0.84 (21)	1.54 (39)	22.00 (559)
Average snowfall inches (cm)	7.9 (20)	5.5 (14)	2.2 (5.6)	0.6 (1.5)	0.0 (0.0)	0.0 (0.0)	0.0 (0.0)	0.0 (0.0)	0.0 (0.0)	1.0 (2.5)	1.8 (4.6)	7.2 (18)	26.2 (67)
Average precipitation days (≥ 0.01 in)	4.8	4.5	4.5	3.8	4.5	8.7	15.0	15.3	8.8	6.7	3.9	5.0	85.5
Average snowy days (≥ 0.1 in)	3.2	2.6	1.5	0.3	0.0	0.0	0.0	0.0	0.0	0.3	0.9	2.7	11.5
Source: NOAA

== Demographics ==
Historical population
Census	Pop.	Note	%±
1950	806		—
1960	1,557		93.2%
1970	2,216		42.3%
1980	4,260		92.2%
1990	4,600		8.0%
2000	7,698		67.3%
2010	8,029		4.3%
2020	7,679		−4.4%
U.S. Decennial Census

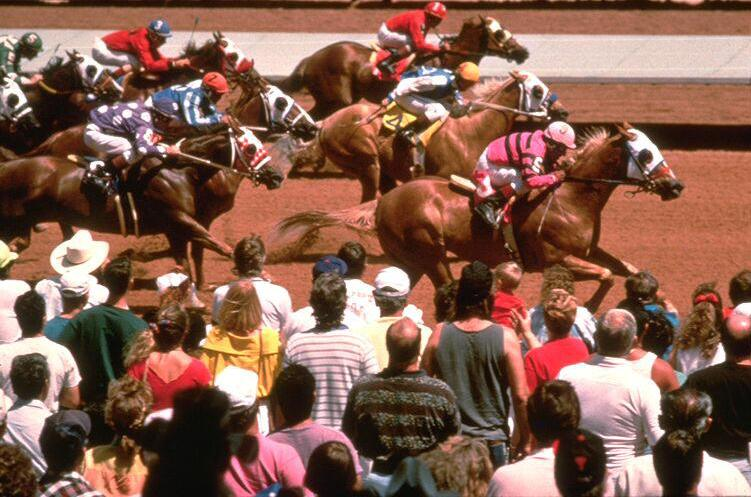
Horse racing at Ruidoso Downs

=== 2020 census ===
As of the 2020 census, Ruidoso had a population of 7,679. The median age was 52.7 years. 17.5% of residents were under the age of 18 and 29.5% of residents were 65 years of age or older. For every 100 females there were 91.3 males, and for every 100 females age 18 and over there were 87.9 males age 18 and over.

95.9% of residents lived in urban areas, while 4.1% lived in rural areas.

There were 3,633 households in Ruidoso, of which 21.0% had children under the age of 18 living in them. Of all households, 42.0% were married-couple households, 19.9% were households with a male householder and no spouse or partner present, and 31.6% were households with a female householder and no spouse or partner present. About 36.2% of all households were made up of individuals and 18.9% had someone living alone who was 65 years of age or older.

There were 8,338 housing units, of which 56.4% were vacant. The homeowner vacancy rate was 4.7% and the rental vacancy rate was 32.9%.

Racial composition as of the 2020 census
Race	Number	Percent
White	5,380	70.1%
Black or African American	36	0.5%
American Indian and Alaska Native	311	4.1%
Asian	90	1.2%
Native Hawaiian and Other Pacific Islander	4	0.1%
Some other race	681	8.9%
Two or more races	1,177	15.3%
Hispanic or Latino (of any race)	2,322	30.2%

=== 2010 census ===
As of the 2010 census, there were 7,868 people, 3,434 households, and 2,232 families residing in the village. The population density was 538.7 inhabitants per square mile (208.0/km^{2}). There were 7,584 housing units at an average density of 530.8 per square mile (204.9/km^{2}). The racial makeup of the village was 80.57 percent White, 0.29 percent African American, 2.38 percent Native American, 0.31 percent Asian, 0.03 percent Pacific Islander, 7.44 percent from other races, and 2.05 percent from two or more races. Hispanic or Latino of any race were 18.21 percent of the population.

There were 3,434 households, out of which 23.6 percent had children under the age of 18 living with them, 53.2 percent were married couples living together, 8.8 percent had a female householder with no husband present, and 35.0 percent were non-families. 29.8 percent of all households were made up of individuals, and 11.3 percent had someone living alone who was 65 years of age or older. The average household size was 2.22 and the average family size was 2.72.

In the village, the population was spread out, with 20.5 percent under the age of 18, 5.8 percent from 18 to 24, 21.9 percent from 25 to 44, 30.1 percent from 45 to 64, and 21.6 percent who were 65 years of age or older. The median age was 46 years. For every 100 females, there were 90.3 males. For every 100 females age 18 and over, there were 87.1 males.

The median income for a household in the village was $37,107, and the median income for a family was $44,846. Males had a median income of $30,452 versus $21,974 for females. The per capita income for the village was $22,721. About 2.5 percent of families and 4.9 percent of the population were below the poverty line, including 24.5 percent of those under age 18 and 5.8 percent of those age 65 or over.

== Education ==
=== K-12 education ===
Ruidoso Municipal School District covers the majority of the municipality. Small pieces extend into Capitan Municipal Schools.

Public schools of the Ruidoso school district:

- Sierra Vista Primary School: Pre K, Kindergarten, 1st and 2nd Grade
- White Mountain Elementary School: 3rd-5th Grade
- Ruidoso Middle School: 6th-8th Grade
- Ruidoso High School: 9th-12th Grade

=== Colleges ===
- ENMU-Ruidoso Branch Community College. The ENMU Ruidoso Campus is a two-year college, or community college, (one of 18 New Mexico branches) and an official Branch of ENMU (this status was granted in July 2005).

=== Public library ===
Ruidoso Public Library
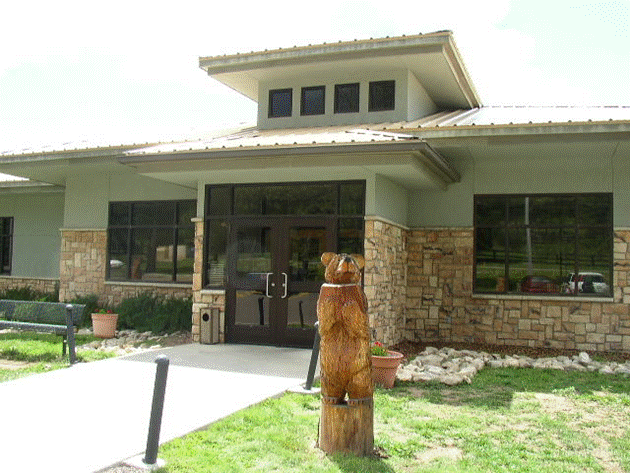
- 33.350224°N 105.661197°W
- Location: 107 Kansas City Road, Ruidoso, NM 88345-6922, United States

Other information
- Employees: 6
- Website: ruidosolibrary.org

Ruidoso Public Library is the library serving Ruidoso, Ruidoso Downs, Alto, and greater Lincoln County.

Starting in 1954, the library developed from the Woman's Club, Beta Sigma Phi with only a small collection of books. In 1960 the Library Advisory Board was created, and Jane Parks served as the first President of the Advisory Board. Shortly after, the library was moved into a building that was once a school and Old City Hall. The library was only two rooms which the librarian Pat Ward oversaw its maintenance. In 1966, under the director Ruth McGuire Spiegel the library was moved to an old airport terminal and now had the bonus of local and state funding. The first library building was built in 1975 at 501 Sudderth Dr. and the library remained in this location for around twenty years.

In 1997 the current library was designed and built by ASA Architectures, the two-story building with vaulted windows is 14,600 square feet. The library has a garden, the Friends’ Book Shoppe, an outdoor reading patio and available window seats. In addition, the library also includes an archive room, conference room, children’s, and teen's library, two self-checkout machines and twenty-nine computers for public use. The collection consists of books, CDs, DVDs, and an e-branch with access to e-books, audio books and magazines. Some of the programs offered at the Ruidoso Public Library are children’s section, adult game night, teen scene, Ruidoso writers publishing group and a bereavement support group. Also, the library offers the New Mexico FamilyPass which provides free admission to fifteen museums and historical sites across the state. The library is open Monday-Saturday.

== Newspapers ==
Ruidoso Free Press is a Lincoln County newspaper, delivered by direct mail to 7100 addresses.

Ruidoso News is in the USA TODAY network.

In Oct 2021, Lincoln County News shut, with the death of publisher Jose Peter Aguilar, closing the weekly newspaper.

== Sports ==
The Ruidoso Osos were an independent professional baseball team in the Pecos League during the 2011 season. The team was on hiatus for the 2012 season because of low attendance. There were no lights on the team's home field, meaning games were played at 4:30 p.m. Additionally, alcohol could not be sold at White Mountain Park because it was owned by Ruidoso Municipal Schools. In the 2013 season, the team moved to Raton and were renamed the Raton Osos.

== Transportation ==
=== Airports ===
- Sierra Blanca Regional Airport, located approximately 15 miles (24 km) northeast of Ruidoso.

=== Major highways ===
- U.S. Route 70
- NM 48

== Notable people ==
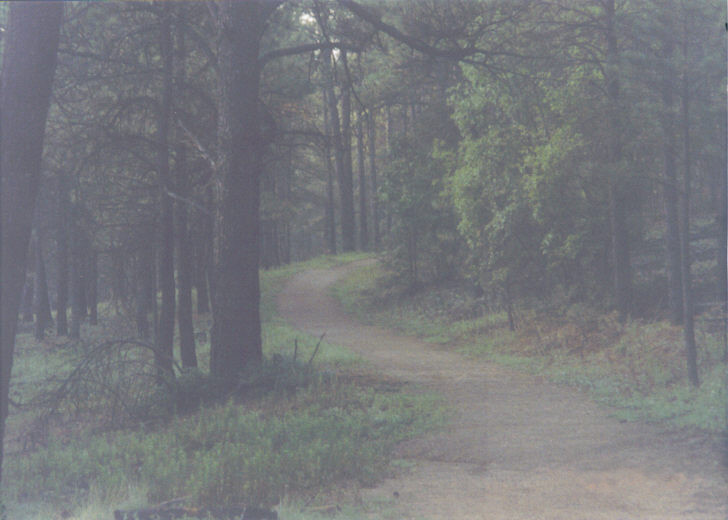
Jogging trail in a municipal park in Ruidoso just after sunrise, July 2008

- Mary Ann Almager, world champion boxer
- Neil Patrick Harris, actor; grew up in Ruidoso
- Yvette Herrell, congresswoman and former member of the New Mexico House of Representatives
- Mike Runnels, lieutenant governor of New Mexico from 1983 to 1987; lived in Ruidoso
- Bram van der Stok, aka Dr. Bram "Bob" Vanderstok, WWII flying ace and hero of "The Great Escape" from Stalag Luft III

== See also ==
- Noisy Water Winery
- Ruidoso River Museum
- Carrizozo
