= Capitan, New Mexico =

Capitan
- Village
- Capitan, New Mexico
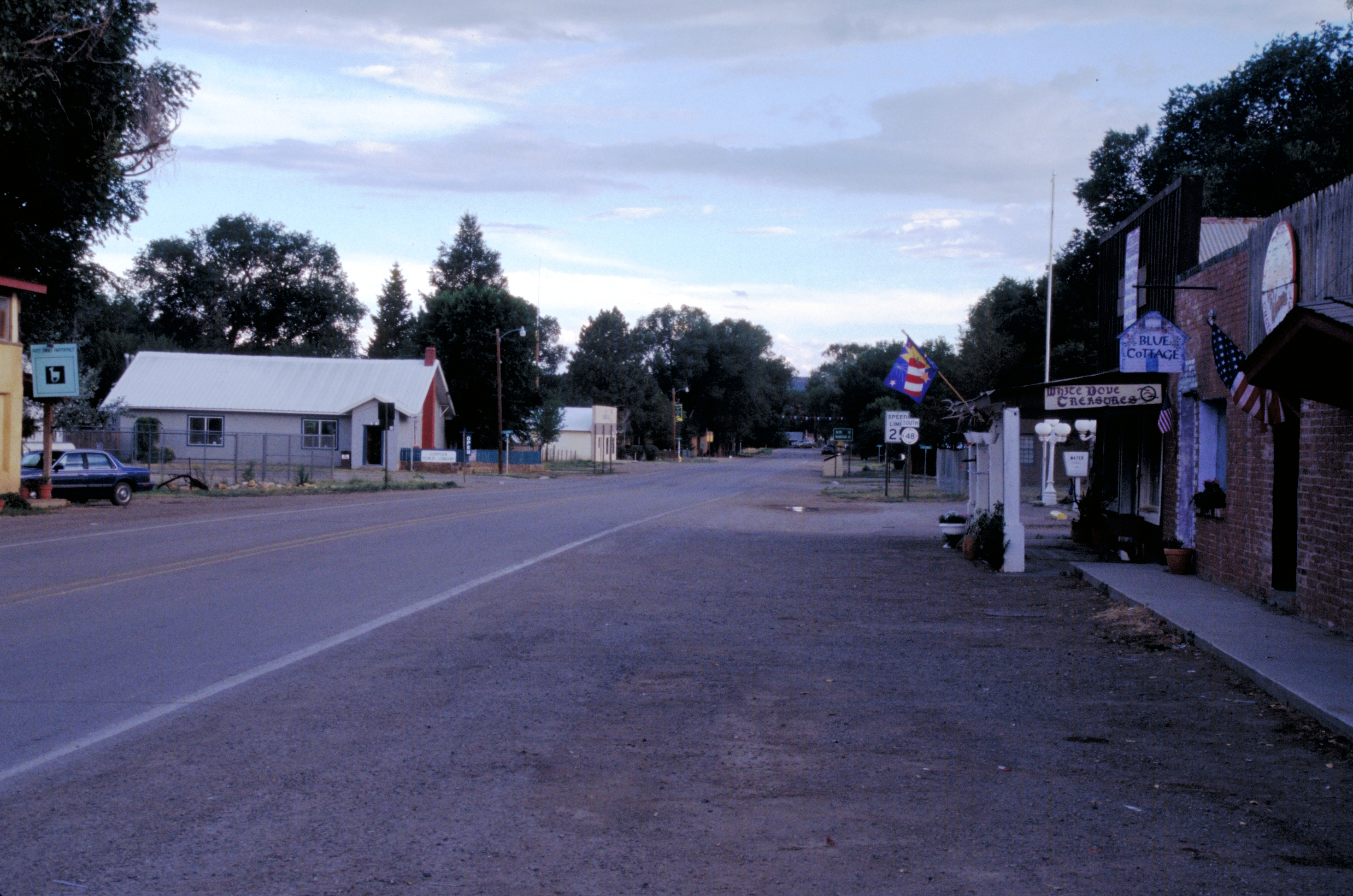
- The Billy the Kid Trail through Capitan

- Location of Capitan, New Mexico

- Location in the United States
- Coordinates: 33°32′38″N 105°34′59″W
- Country: United States
- State: New Mexico
- County: Lincoln

Area
  - Total: 3.26 sq mi (8.44 km^{2})
  - Land: 3.26 sq mi (8.44 km^{2})
  - Water: 0 sq mi (0.00 km^{2})
- Elevation: 6,400 ft (1,950 m)

Population (2020)
  - Total: 1,391
  - Density: 426.8/sq mi (164.78/km^{2})
- Time zone: UTC-7 (Mountain (MST))
  - Summer (DST): UTC-6 (MDT)
- ZIP code: 88316
- Area code: 575
- FIPS code: 35-11800
- GNIS feature ID: 0923574
- Website: www.villageofcapitan.org

Capitan is a village in Lincoln County, New Mexico, United States, located north of the Lincoln National Forest between the Capitan and Sacramento Mountains at an elevation of 6,350 feet (1,950 m). As of the 2020 census, Capitan had a population of 1,391. Capitan was founded in the 1890s and incorporated in 1941.

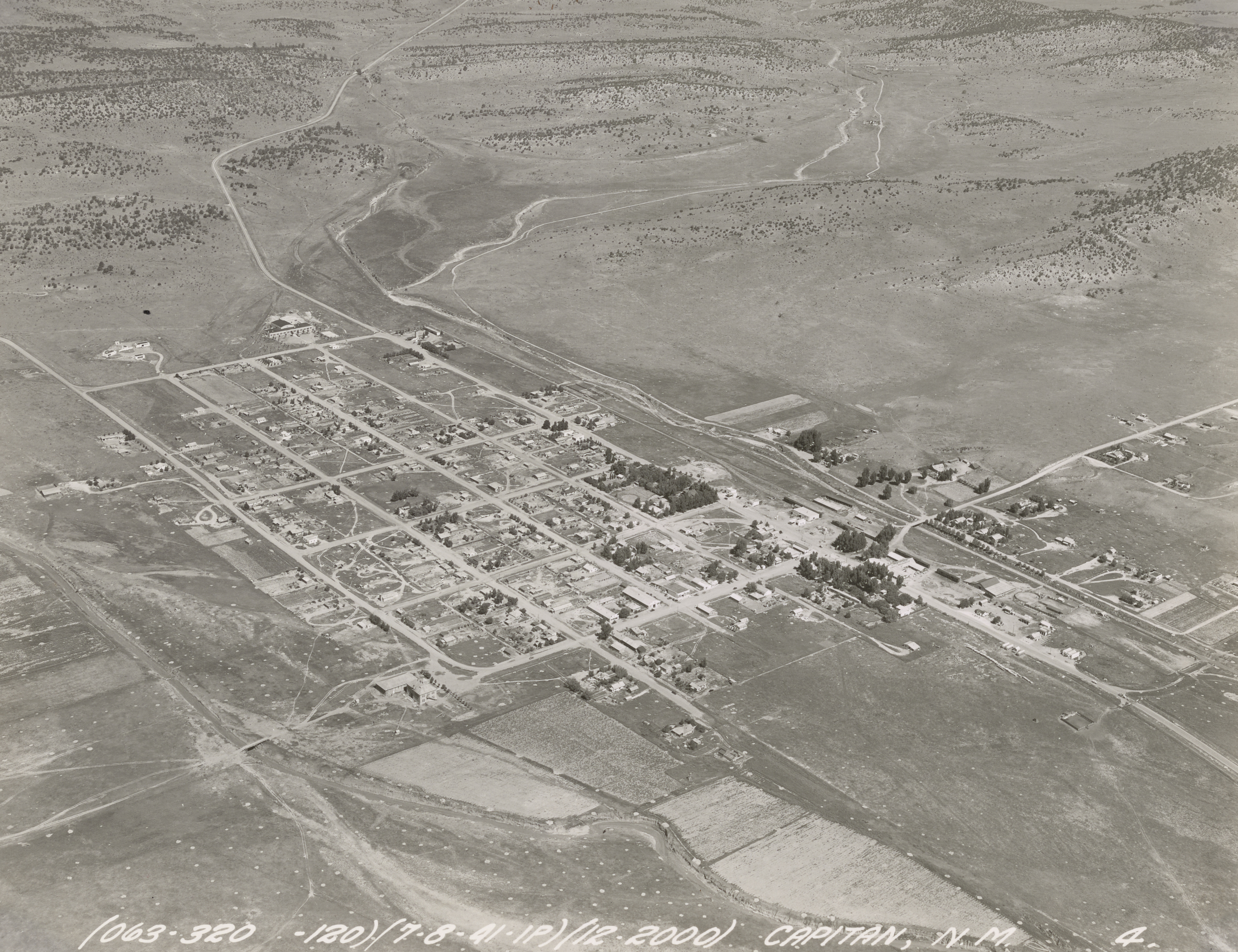
Aerial view of Capitan in 1941

== Geography ==
According to the United States Census Bureau, Capitan has a total area of 3.2 square miles (8.3 km^{2}), all land. The community is surrounded by high desert mountains and New Mexico cedar, pinon and juniper trees.

=== Climate ===
Climate data for Capitan, New Mexico
Month	Jan	Feb	Mar	Apr	May	Jun	Jul	Aug	Sep	Oct	Nov	Dec	Year
Record high °F (°C)	73 (23)	73 (23)	79 (26)	85 (29)	94 (34)	101 (38)	98 (37)	97 (36)	91 (33)	85 (29)	79 (26)	71 (22)	101 (38)
Mean daily maximum °F (°C)	49 (9)	53 (12)	59 (15)	68 (20)	76 (24)	84 (29)	83 (28)	81 (27)	76 (24)	68 (20)	57 (14)	49 (9)	67 (19)
Mean daily minimum °F (°C)	23 (−5)	25 (−4)	29 (−2)	35 (2)	43 (6)	49 (9)	54 (12)	53 (12)	47 (8)	38 (3)	29 (−2)	23 (−5)	37 (3)
Record low °F (°C)	−4 (−20)	−6 (−21)	−2 (−19)	8 (−13)	25 (−4)	33 (1)	42 (6)	41 (5)	30 (−1)	8 (−13)	−11 (−24)	−15 (−26)	−15 (−26)
Average precipitation inches (mm)	0.64 (16)	0.79 (20)	0.63 (16)	0.53 (13)	1.17 (30)	1.55 (39)	3.49 (89)	3.51 (89)	2.21 (56)	1.25 (32)	1.08 (27)	1.00 (25)	17.85 (452)
Average snowfall inches (cm)	7 (18)	6.8 (17)	4.7 (12)	1.3 (3.3)	0.2 (0.51)	0 (0)	0 (0)	0 (0)	0 (0)	0.9 (2.3)	1.9 (4.8)	9.2 (23)	32 (80.91)
Source 1:
Source 2:

== Demographics ==
Historical population
Census	Pop.	Note	%±
1940	932		—
1950	575		−38.3%
1960	552		−4.0%
1970	439		−20.5%
1980	762		73.6%
1990	842		10.5%
2000	1,443		71.4%
2010	1,489		3.2%
2020	1,391		−6.6%
U.S. Decennial Census

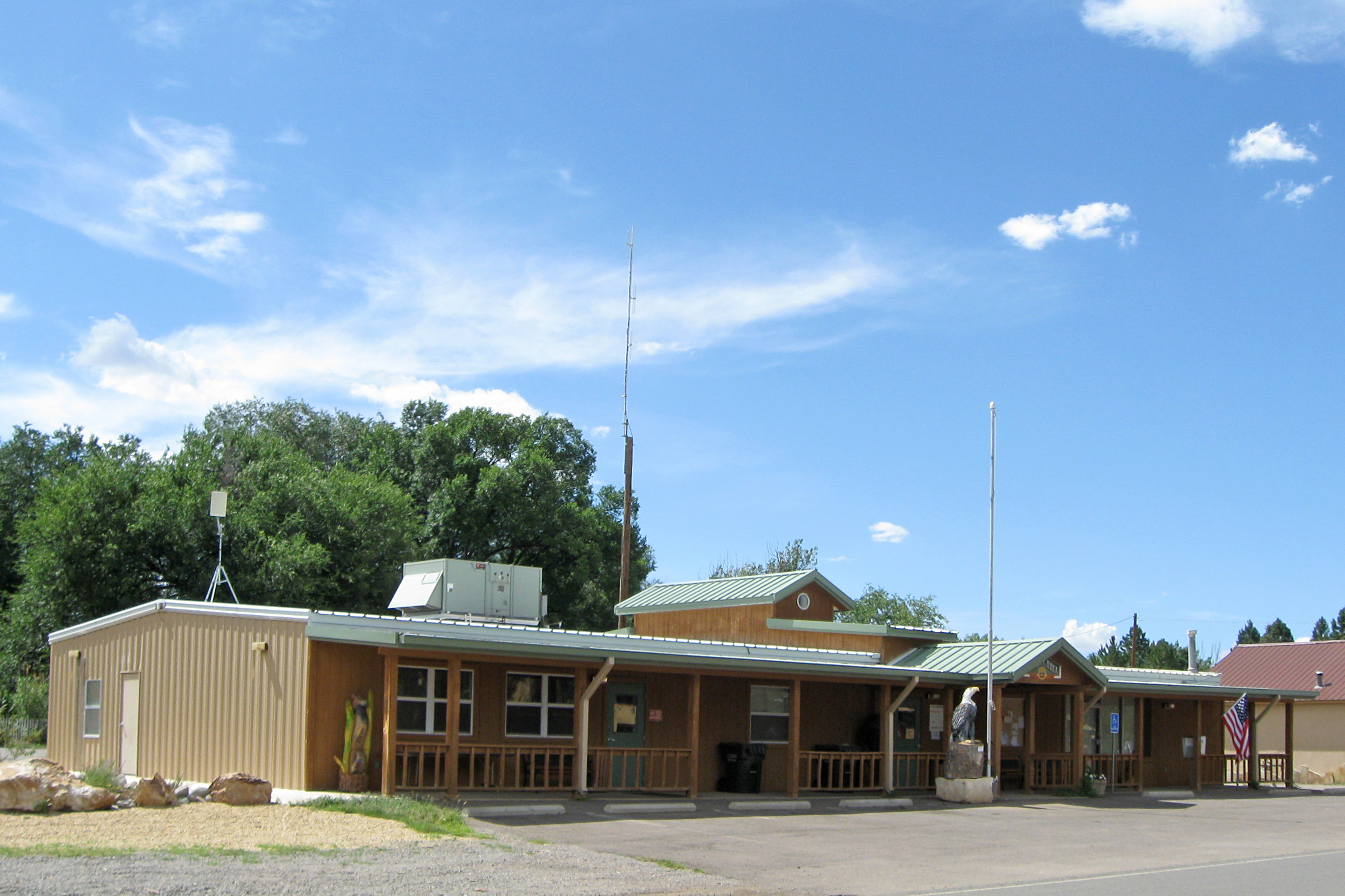
Capitan Village Hall

As of the census of 2000, there were 1,443 people, 605 households, and 416 families residing in the village. The population density was 450.9 inhabitants per square mile (174.1/km^{2}). There were 717 housing units at an average density of 224.0 per square mile (86.5/km^{2}). The racial makeup of the village was 83.57% White, 0.55% African American, 1.46% Native American, 0.55% Asian, 0.07% Pacific Islander, 7.76% from other races, and 2.08% from two or more races. Hispanic or Latino of any race were 19.20% of the population.

There were 605 households, out of which 26.4% had children under the age of 18 living with them, 56.0% were married couples living together, 9.8% had a female householder with no husband present, and 31.2% were non-families. 27.4% of all households were made up of individuals, and 10.4% had someone living alone who was 65 years of age or older. The average household size was 2.39 and the average family size was 2.91.

In the village, the population was spread out, with 24.9% under the age of 18, 5.9% from 18 to 24, 22.6% from 25 to 44, 29.9% from 45 to 64, and 16.6% who were 65 years of age or older. The median age was 42 years. For every 100 females, there were 97.4 males. For every 100 females age 18 and over, there were 93.4 males.

The median income for a household in the village was $27,188, and the median income for a family was $32,115. Males had a median income of $23,500 versus $16,902 for females. The per capita income for the village was $15,062. About 8.3% of families and 13.0% of the population were below the poverty line, including 13.7% of those under age 18 and 12.1% of those age 65 or over.

== Smokey Bear ==
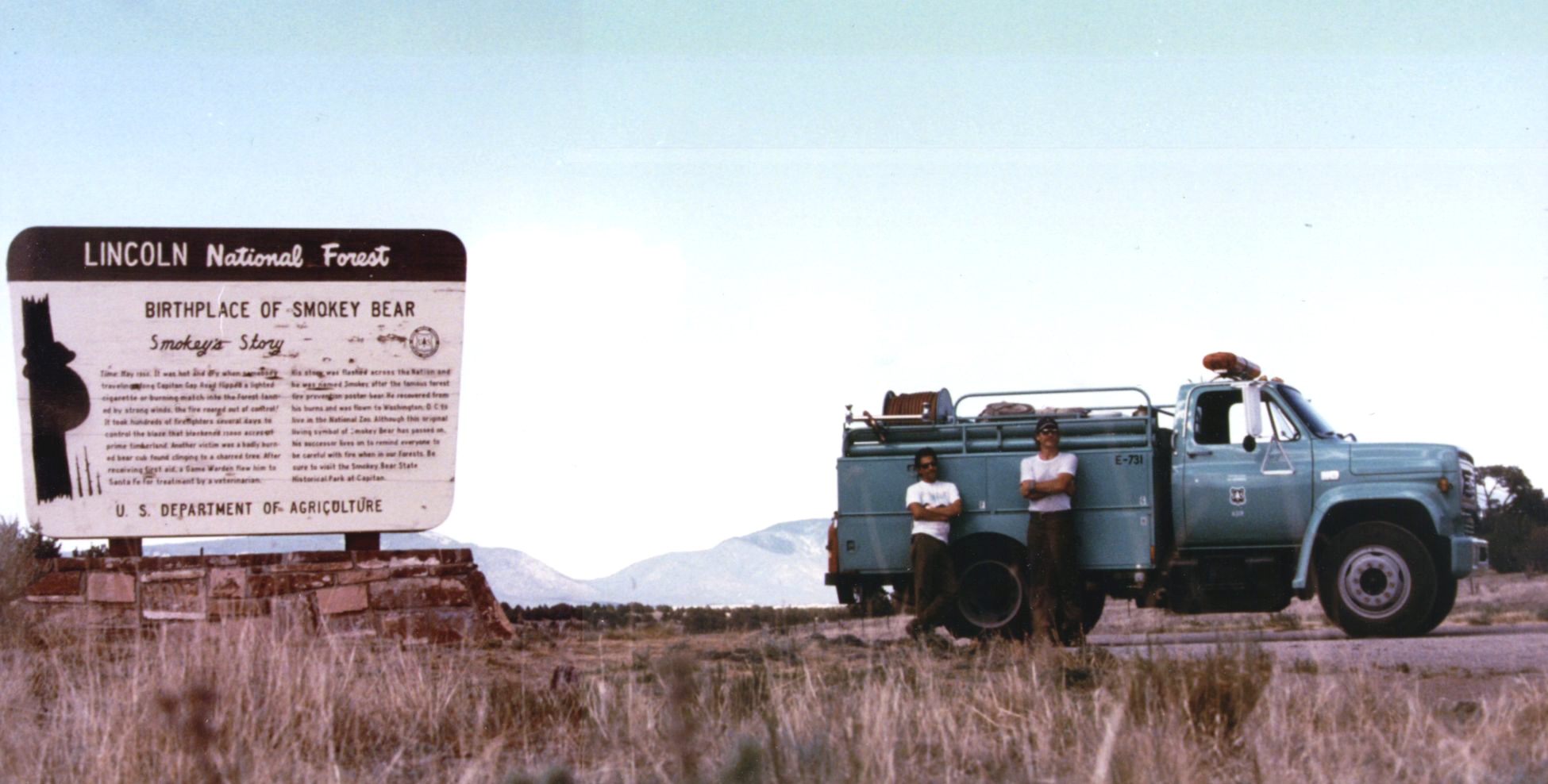
Tahoe National Forest Fire Engine 731 and Crew at Smokey Bear Viewpoint in June 1990 with the Capitan Mountains and Capitan Gap in the distance. Capitan village is in the valley between the Mountains and the Viewpoint.

In spring of 1950, a badly burned black bear cub was rescued from a large forest fire at Capitan Gap in the Capitan Mountains. First called Hotfoot Teddy, he was later renamed Smokey and became the real-life version of the United States Forest Service mascot Smokey Bear. Smokey was later sent to the National Zoo in Washington D.C., where he lived for 26 years. Upon his death on November 9, 1976, Smokey's remains were returned by the government to Capitan and buried at what is now the Smokey Bear Historical Park.

== Education ==
The school district is the Capitan Municipal Schools school district.

Capitan Public Library is the library facility.

== Transportation ==
Major Highways

- U.S. Route 380
- NM 48
- NM 246
