= National Register of Historic Places listings in Lincoln County, New Mexico =

Location of Lincoln County in New Mexico

This is a list of the National Register of Historic Places listings in Lincoln County, New Mexico.

This is intended to be a complete list of the properties and districts on the National Register of Historic Places in Lincoln County, New Mexico, United States. Latitude and longitude coordinates are provided for many National Register properties and districts; these locations may be seen together in a map.

There are 35 properties and districts listed on the National Register in the county, including 2 National Historic Landmarks. All of the places within the county on the National Register are also listed on the State Register of Cultural Properties with the single exception of the Lincoln Historic District although the landmark includes one contributing property recorded on the state register. NRHP properties within the county include two of the state's eight officially designated state historic sites.

This National Park Service list is complete through NPS recent listings posted August 1, 2025.

Contents: NRHP in New Mexico by county
Bernalillo – Catron – Chaves – Cibola – Colfax – Curry – De Baca – Doña Ana – Eddy – Grant – Guadalupe – Harding – Hidalgo – Lea – Lincoln – Los Alamos – Luna – McKinley – Mora – Otero – Quay – Rio Arriba – Roosevelt – San Juan – San Miguel – Sandoval – Santa Fe – Sierra – Socorro – Taos – Torrance – Union – Valencia

== Current listings ==
	Name on the Register	Image	Date listed	Location	City or town	Description
1	Aguayo Family Homestead		December 28, 1995 (#95001478)	Tortolita Canyon, west of Nogal; 33°32′06″N 105°45′09″W	Nogal	
2	Archeological Site LA 12151		September 13, 1988 (#88001507)	Address Restricted	Lincoln	
3	Archeological Site LA 12153		February 18, 1990 (#88001508)	Address Restricted	Lincoln	
4	Archeological Site LA 12155		February 18, 1990 (#88001509)	Address Restricted	Lincoln	
5	Archeological Site LA 61201		September 13, 1988 (#88001510)	Address Restricted	Lincoln	
6	Archeological Site LA 61202		February 18, 1990 (#88001511)	Address Restricted	Lincoln	
7	Archeological Site LA 61204		September 13, 1988 (#88001512)	Address Restricted	Lincoln	
8	Archeological Site LA 61206		September 13, 1988 (#88001513)	Address Restricted	Lincoln	
9	Archeological Site LA 61208		September 13, 1988 (#88001514)	Address Restricted	Lincoln	
10	Archeological Site LA 61210		September 13, 1988 (#88001516)	Address Restricted	Lincoln	
11	Archeological Site LA 61211		September 13, 1988 (#88001515)	Address Restricted	Lincoln	
12	Archeological Site No. AR-03-08-01-051		August 28, 1990 (#90001251)	Address Restricted	White Oaks	
13	Archeological Site No. AR-03-08-01-052		August 28, 1990 (#90001252)	Address Restricted	White Oaks	
14	Carrizozo Commercial Historic District		August 22, 2016 (#16000550)	Roughly bounded by Brick & D Aves., 11th & 13th Sts. 33°38′36″N 105°52′32″W	Carrizozo	
15	Carrizozo Woman's Club	Carrizozo Woman's Club	October 6, 2003 (#03000995)	908 11th St. 33°38′33″N 105°52′43″W	Carrizozo	
16	El Paso And Southwestern Railway Water Supply System		November 21, 1979 (#79001540)	South of Nogal; 33°29′30″N 105°40′44″W	Nogal	
17	Feather Cave		November 20, 1974 (#74001198)	Address Restricted	Lincoln	
18	Fort Stanton	Fort Stanton	April 13, 1973 (#73001142)	7 miles (11 km) southeast of Capitan near U.S. Route 380; 33°29′40″N 105°31′35″W	Capitan	State Historic Site
19	Funston Site (AR-03-08-01-046)		August 28, 1990 (#90001250)	Address Restricted	White Oaks	
20	Hopeful Lode		August 22, 1995 (#95001014)	Along Forest Rd. 108, 6 miles north of the junction of Forest Rds. 107 and 108, north of Bonito Lake; 33°29′19″N 105°46′55″W	Nogal	
21	Peter and Henriette Wyeth Hurd House	Peter and Henriette Wyeth Hurd House	December 10, 2014 (#14001015)	129 La Mancha Ln. 33°24′13″N 105°19′47″W	San Patricio	Designated a National Historic Landmark in 2024.
22	Jicarilla Schoolhouse	Jicarilla Schoolhouse	April 14, 1983 (#83001623)	State Road 349 in the Lincoln National Forest; 33°51′40″N 105°39′16″W	Jicarilla	
23	Luis A. and Susan B. Jimenez House and Studios		December 10, 2014 (#14001016)	Address Restricted	Hondo	
24	Lincoln Historic District	Lincoln Historic District	October 15, 1966 (#66000477)	U.S. Route 380; 33°29′41″N 105°22′56″W	Lincoln	State Historic Site
25	Mesa Ranger Station Barn		June 17, 2025 (#100011946)	National Forest Road 131/Ranger Road, Lincoln National Forest; 33°31′03″N 105°41′26″W	Nogal vicinity	
26	Mesa Ranger Station Site		October 22, 1990 (#90001533)	Address Restricted	Nogal	
27	Monjeau Lookout	Monjeau Lookout	January 27, 1988 (#87002483)	Lincoln National Forest; 33°25′51″N 105°43′53″W	Villa Madonna	
28	New Mexico Military Institute Summer Camp, Main Building		May 2, 1983 (#83001622)	Carrizo Canyon; 33°18′22″N 105°40′08″W	Ruidoso	
29	Nogal Mesa Kiva Site		October 22, 1990 (#90001532)	Address Restricted	Nogal	
30	Nogal Mesa Site		October 22, 1990 (#90001531)	Address Restricted	Nogal	
31	Old Dowlin Mill	Old Dowlin Mill	September 25, 2013 (#13000768)	641 Sudderth Dr. 33°19′25″N 105°38′51″W	Ruidoso	
32	Paden's Drug Store	Paden's Drug Store	March 23, 2005 (#05000204)	1200-1208 E Ave. 33°38′35″N 105°52′42″W	Carrizozo	Now Roy's Ice Cream Parlour
33	Ruidoso Lookout Tower		January 27, 1988 (#87002485)	Lincoln National Forest; 33°19′54″N 105°39′43″W	Ruidoso	
34	White Oaks Historic District	White Oaks Historic District	September 4, 1970 (#70000403)	12 miles northeast of Carrizozo on State Road 349; 33°45′03″N 105°45′22″W	White Oaks	
35	Wizard's Roost		August 2, 1982 (#82004841)	Address Restricted	Capitan	

== See also ==
- List of National Historic Landmarks in New Mexico
- National Register of Historic Places listings in New Mexico
