= Dinosaur Planet (TV series) =

- Starring: Scott D. Sampson
- Narrated by: Christian Slater
- Composer: Dean Grinsfelder
- Country of origin: United States
- No. of seasons: 1
- No. of episodes: 4

Production
- Executive producers: Jean Raymond Bourque; Tomi Bednar Landis; Pierre de Lespinois; Fran LoCascio; Frances LoCascio; Paul Nightingale
- Running time: 48 minutes

Original release
- Network: Discovery Channel
- Release: December 14 – December 16, 2003

Dinosaur Planet is a four-part American nature documentary that aired on the Discovery Channel as a special-two night event on December 14 and 16, 2003. It is hosted by paleontologist Scott Sampson and narrated by actor Christian Slater. It was released on DVD as a two-disc pack on February 17, 2004, and was also released on VHS around the same time.

The format is similar to Discovery's earlier series When Dinosaurs Roamed America. Each episode tells a fictionalized account of a dinosaur from the Late Cretaceous period. The animals are recreated with computer-generated imagery and composited into present-day filmed locations that approximate prehistoric Earth. Periodic interludes (three in each episode) feature Scott Sampson explaining the scientific findings behind the story, also similar to When Dinosaurs Roamed America, but has improved in quality.

== Episodes ==
| No. | Title | Directed by | Written by | Original release date |
|---|---|---|---|---|
| 1 | "White Tip's Journey" | Pierre de Lespinois | Mike Carroll (story), Michael Ormert and Georgann Kane (narration), Gary Parker (paleontologist segments) | December 14, 2003 |
Setting: Gobi Desert, (Mongolia), 80 MYA; Filming Locations: Oceano Dunes State Vehicular Recreation Area, California; In the vast deserts of Prehistoric Mongolia during the Cretaceous time zone, a lone female Velociraptor, White Tip, is walking across the barren dunes. She once lived with other raptors in a group but another pack of raptors attacked her group and all her fellow pack members were massacred by the rival Velociraptor. Only White Tip escaped alive, and she must find a new group. She tries to hunt a small pachycephalosaurid dinosaur called Prenocephale, but fails, as she cannot efficiently hunt without other raptors to back her up. She then turns to hunt smaller prey such as a lizard. During one of her hunts, White Tip hears the screams of an Oviraptor flock and heads to the location. When she gets there, the Oviraptor turn out to be in a mating ritual, where a young male tries to seduce the female with his brilliant plumage, but his tactics fail and the female leaves. Then an older male arrives and drives the young bachelor away. Enraged, the Oviraptor then takes his anger out on White Tip, who runs away. A moment later, White Tip stumbles into a shallow valley of a Protoceratops nest, where she encounters a doe and a buck. She is chased away by the old male ceratopsian guarding his mate and clutch of eggs. Luckily, the bull chases her into the territory of another male Protoceratops, who challenges, and duels the intruder. The old bull is outclassed by the other bull Protoceratops in a head-butting match, and is driven off. The older Protoceratops limps away, bleeding while dazed and disoriented. White Tip finishes the bull off and begins her meal. While she eats, the smell of blood attracts a small pack of other Velociraptor, led by an alpha male, Broken Hand, who had injured one of his arms in an earlier battle. They follow the blood trail to White Tip's kill, and she reluctantly hands her kill over. At first, she makes to continue her lone journey, but stops: White Tip realizes the pack is strong, and tries to joins them. However, the other male in the pack, Blue Brow, shows curiosity first, and, taking it as a sign of an attempt to change authority, Broken Hand suddenly shows aggression towards Blue Brow, knocking White Tip out of the way. After a short argument, a fight ensues with Blue Brow winning, and Broken Hand flees, stunned and disgraced. Blue Brow is the new raptor alpha and allows White Tip to join the pack as his mate. Later, the pack heads off to hunt for one thing most raptors love eating: nutritional dinosaur eggs. What they find is a Protoceratops herd of seven to eight individuals guarding two nests of eggs. The females lunge forward, snapping and biting to goad the Protoceratops long enough for Blue Brow and White Tip to go in and raid the nests. The Protoceratops focus on defending against the female Velociraptor whilst White Tip and Blue Brow go behind the group, steal several eggs and flee, with the other raptors retreating close behind soon after. However, the loot is divided: Blue Brow keeps his eggs, and White Tip has to give hers away. Three months later, White Tip has high authority in the pack, and also is soon to be a mother. She later lays her eggs under the shade of several desert trees but because there are predators everywhere, she must stay with her eggs, while the rest of the pack go hunting. The others chase a Shuvuuia, but an Oviraptor suddenly lunges out of the trees and catches it first, ruining the raptors' hunt. Because the pack did not kill any prey, White Tip goes hungry. During the night, she tries to catch a Deltatheridium, but is interrupted by Broken Hand, eating two of her five eggs in his attempt to stay strong. She runs back and scares Broken Hand off. Soon, White Tip's eggs hatch, and she can go hunting with the others. This time, they make a successful attack on a Oviraptor nest. White Tip gives one of the dead Oviraptor children to her own, and both species of dinosaur infants, strangely, look similar, though it is noted that White Tip's children could have easily been Oviraptor food too. That night, heavy rain pours down across the entire desert. After the rain, the pack goes on the hunt, refusing to help their previous leader, Broken Hand. Broken Hand foolishly tries to attack a Prenocephale herd, but the armored herbivores are working together to beat him up and drive him off. A few days later, the pack discovers Broken Hand's rotting corpse and move on, deciding that he is too putrid to eat. When they do manage to find the Protoceratops herd, the other two female Velociraptors slide down the hill to goad them, while Blue Brow and White Tip go around to attack from behind to trap the ceratopsian dinosaurs. White Tip makes the first move by pouncing on one and tries to wound it, but gets thrown off and onto the ground by the bucking ceratopsian. Blue Brow takes on another Protoceratops, a strong male, whom he fought before. The male raptor lunges and tries to wrestle his foe to the ground, but his wrist is crushed by the Protoceratops' s beak but not before Blue Brow buries one of his large foot claws into the dinosaur's stomach. The raptor pulls himself free of the buck's grasp and the dinosaurs prepare to battle again, but the heavy rain from the storm has weakened the dunes above them and as the dune collapses in on itself, a landslide buries Blue Brow and the Protoceratops, along with the two female raptors, while White Tip and the other Protoceratops watch as their fellows die. White Tip, once again, is left without a pack, but this time, she returns to her offspring, and raises her young as new additions to form her own pack. Later on, Blue Brow and the Protoceratops he died with, will become the famous Fighting Dinosaurs fossil.
| 2 | "Little Das' Hunt" | Pierre de Lespinois | Mike Carroll (story), Stephen Eder (narration), Gary Parker (paleontologist segments) | December 14, 2003 |
Setting: the Elkhorn Range, in the future American state of Montana, 75-68 MYA.; Filming locations: Mesa Ranch, Nogal, New Mexico; Vista Rio Bonito, New Mexico; Bonito Lake Recreation Area, New Mexico; Lincoln National Forest, New Mexico; and Sequoia National Forest, California.; In prehistoric Montana in the Late Cretaceous era, huge grasslands and patches of forest cover the region and the area is bordered by active volcanoes. The Rocky Mountains are being formed with numerous, minor volcanic eruptions. In the highlands, a herd of Orodromeus are grazing on the long grasses sprouting from the nutrient-rich volcanic soil. As they graze, a trio of hunting Troodon watch from behind the trees and ready themselves to lunge at the herd. But before they can do so, the lookout dinosaur spots them and wails a distress call. The dinosaurs flee in terror and move incredibly fast as the Troodon chase after them. However, the predators are forced to slow down on a rocky hill covered in small boulders because they can't afford to break their foot claws in such a reckless race. Suddenly, the ground shakes as a deadly blast of superheated water smashes through the ground as a geyser, propelling one of the Troodon into the air. It then crashes down dead, having died instantly upon impact. Their hunt ends with disastrous results, and the remaining Troodon turn and retreat as other geysers punch up through the air everywhere. Meanwhile, in the lowlands, a herd of Maiasaura are walking across the plains. Two younger animals, Buck and Blaze, decide to wander away from their herd to forage on the slopes. Suddenly, they are confronted by Little Das, a young Daspletosaurus, who begins to chase them further away from the herd, who occasionally watch as they move along. Das's older sisters then chase Buck and Blaze towards their mother, who appears from the trees and bites Buck deep on his right back leg. Because of his boundless excitement, Little Das accidentally slams into the mother; she stumbles and her jaws lose their hold on the struggling dinosaur, allowing the Maiasaura to return to their herd. Das gets to his feet, and the other Daspletosaurus growl at him. The next day, worrying that Das will ruin the hunt, Das' mother and sisters leave him in a grove of trees. When Das can't find them he goes searching and finds a herd of Einiosaurus, horned dinosaurs, grazing on the plains. Thinking he is a scout for an older Daspletosaurus, the Einiosaurus stampede, alerting the Maiasaura to the danger, and Little Das yet again ruins the hunt as his family had been just about to ambush the herd, and his mother bites him in anger. Meanwhile, the highland animals – Orodromeus, Troodon and flying pterosaurs such as Quetzalcoatlus – are beginning to see signs of the inevitable volcanic explosion. The water inside the lake the Orodromeus herd drink from is boiling, and one of the Quetzalcoatlus nesting grounds are demolished by geysers that erupt out of the ground as the cliffside collapses. The pterosaurs all launch off and fly away to get to new nesting grounds. Only the pterosaurs will escape and survive the approaching fiery eruption as they will until the mass extinction of the dinosaurs. Meanwhile, Little Das and his family are once again on the hunt, targeting the injured Buck. The Einiosaurus herd and the Maiasaura are grazing together. When the Daspletosaurus attack, the Einiosaurus form a barricade to defend themselves from the Daspletosaurus, shielding Buck as well in the process. Buck desperately struggles after the retreating herd and Blaze stays by his side at all times. When the Daspletosaurus spot him, they go around the Einiosaurus and continue to go after him. The family is startled by the corpse of a fallen Quetzalcoatlus that was hit by an erupting geyser while flying and killed by the boiling water before spiraling back to the ground. Little Das takes a whiff of the corpse, but he sneezes violently. Agitated, Little Das stomps on the corpse and storms off after Buck's trail, with his family following. But when they approach, the volcano erupts violently, miles of sky are lost in a heavy blanket of volcanic ash and dust that block out all the sunlight. Visibility is poor and the Daspletosaurus must rely on their keen sense of smell to find their target. Buck must use sensitive hearing to listen for the cries of his herd and of Blaze. Small pieces of glass and soot begin to fall from the sky. Closer to the volcano, huge burning pieces of rock erupt from the seething crater and the lava missiles all come plummeting down amongst the forest. One Troodon is killed instantly by a falling lava boulder. After the eruption, the ash cloud begins to clear, some sunlight shines through. But, the west flank of the mountain collapses under the intense pressure from the bubbling magma and a pyroclastic flow begins to engulf the land. It's a wall of superheated rock, debris, and ash that destroys everything around it and levels the forests and grasslands. The temperature under the flow and within it exceed 800 degrees. It levels the highlands first and then the lowlands, completely suffocating every dinosaur from Montana to the Western Interior Seaway. Most of the Troodon are blasted away by the flow as it destroys the forest. The Daspletosaurus abandon the hunt to flee the approaching flow which they process as a threat. The mother, the sisters, and Das all flee but the flow catches up and they are killed. The retreating Maiasaura are also buried by the flow. Buck and Blaze die as well. We then shift 7 million years forward in time. Most of life is sustained again as the eruptions have ceased. Most dinosaurs have evolved. Maiasaura has evolved into Edmontosaurus, and Daspletosaurus has evolved into Tyrannosaurus rex. The story then ends as a young Tyrannosaurus rex and its mother look down upon on a herd of Edmontosaurus, including an immature one. The conflict between them continues the stories of their ancient ancestors: Buck and Das.
| 3 | "Alpha's Egg" | Pierre de Lespinois | Mike Carroll (story), Michael Ormert and Georgann Kane (narration), Gary Parker (paleontologist segments) | December 16, 2003 |
Setting: the forests of Patagonia in South America, 80 MYA.; Filming Locations: Kings Canyon National Park, California; and Sequoia National Forest, California.; The episode starts with a herd of Saltasaurus, all of them female, heading for their nesting grounds. Alpha, a young heifer, is making the trip for the first time since she was born. The narrator explains that their only protection is their numbers and size. Saltasaurus are not the only dinosaurs in the area, however: Aucasaurus lurk in the forests. Dragonfly, a teenage male, and his mate have been drawn by a corpse of a dead saltasaur. Knowing that no one is around, they walk and eat. However, a pair of carcharodontosaurs appear from the shadows and ruin their lunch, much to Dragonfly's dismay. The nesting ground is a large flat river plain, larger than 3 football fields. Although Alpha needs to find a spot to lay her eggs, she's not the first to arrive, since the older females are veterans of building nests. Alpha builds a nest and lays her eggs for the first time. Then she and the herd head back to the forest to collect bushy leaves to incubate their eggs. The program jumps back in time 15 years to the same ground, showing how Alpha's own story began. Approaching the hatching period, the nesting ground is still guarded by a couple of female Saltasaurus, keeping some potential plunderers off the nests. One of these, an Alvarezsaurus, pecks at an egg while pushing Alpha's away. However, a crocodile, Notosuchus, scares the plunderer off, and pokes a hole in Alpha's egg, only to be fended off by an adult Saltasaurus. Alpha is the first of her nest to hatch. Meanwhile, in the forest, a young Aucasaurus, Dragonfly, is also born. His mother hears some rustling from the bushes, and a male Aucasaurus appears. She bares her teeth and hisses at him. The male is her mate, and he soothes her by inflating his throat pouch. While the female takes a nap, her babies have some fun. Dragonfly, the oldest, is goofing off with a dragonfly. He tries to grab it, but misses. Dragonfly will become the main enemy to Alpha. That night, all the baby Saltasaurus have hatched, and they rush for the safety of the forest, dodging Alvarezsaurus and Notosuchus. Dozens of Saltasaurus calves are slain and devoured while they make a run for their lives. That morning, Alpha comes face to face with a hungry Notosuchus, but just in time, an adult Saltasaurus scares it away. Alpha and her fellow youngsters travel along with the adult Saltasaurus herd. Moments later, the herd stops to browse on the treetops. At one point, they are interrupted by the same family of Aucasaurus. The male and his mate are teaching Dragonfly and his sisters how to hunt. They confront the adult Saltasaurus, but Dragonfly alerts his mother to one of the groups of Saltasaurus calves that split up in alarm. She turns her head, spots them and directs their assault on the calves, devouring five of them. As the adult Aucasaurs and the young females pass by, Alpha comes face to face with Dragonfly. Luckily, a dragonfly flies by and Dragonfly starts to chase it, and Alpha survives. As Alpha enters adolescence, she meets Dragonfly again, this time in the wildlands. While Alpha and her herd head for a forest to eat, Dragonfly and his family are right behind them. Dragonfly eagerly darts towards Alpha. She startles him with a bellowing growl, and he jumps away. The Aucasaurus pack trots ahead. As Alpha browses from a tree, another female Saltasaurus comes forward and angrily shoves her aside to eat the leaves, but stumbles on a log, and tumbles down a hill, breaking bones. Alerted by the injured female's screams of pain, the Aucasaurus pack heads over to her and kills the wounded animal, with one Aucasaurus piercing the Saltasaurus' jugular. As they eat, Dragonfly slams his thigh into one of his sisters, but his father scolds him for this action and his rude behavior. The pack continues to eat. A while later, Dragonfly wakes up from a good nap, gets to his feet and heads off to look for a mate to start a pack with, since he knows that as long as he stays, he'll end up being scolded by his father. Sometime later, the mating season ensues, and Alpha is in heat. One young bull attempts to try his luck, but the older bull, who is the leader of the herd, challenges him to a duel: this involves shouting, followed by necking (like modern giraffes) and headbutting. The younger bull wins the duel and mates with Alpha. After the mating season ends, the herd heads toward the grasslands. On the way, Alpha, watching a stalking Dragonfly rather than the ground in front of her, nearly trips on a log and sprains her wrist. Soon after, Dragonfly finds a female Aucasaurus around his age and attempts to seduce her by inflating his throat pouch, but she at first refuses. However, his persistence and inflating of his throat pouch finally win her heart, and they become mates. Meanwhile, the herd passes through the grasslands, but watching them from the shadows are a pair of carcharodontosaurs. In spite of her sprained wrist, Alpha manages to outpace a sick, older female, who is mauled and devoured by the carcharodontosaurs. Soon, the herd reaches the nesting ground where the story began, and lay their eggs. But, after their nests are complete, a thunderstorm brews over the plain, and the nesting ground is in ruins. Following the deluge, the unborn Saltasaurus babies drown. Later, as Alpha looks for a spot to eat, she senses Dragonfly and his mate nearby and readies herself for a duel with them. Dragonfly bares his teeth and goes for an attack. Alpha headbutts him, whips the female Aucasaurus with her tail, knocking the Aucasaurus off her feet and rendering her unable to get up, and then rams Dragonfly, disorienting him for a short time. He wakes up from his disorientation and clamps his jaws on Alpha's left shoulder, but Alpha loses her balance and falls, crushing Dragonfly's skull under her weight, killing him. Alpha then rises to her feet, stares at Dragonfly's corpse and leaves victorious. The Aucasaur female rises to her feet, having just witnessed the whole thing, and tries to wake Dragonfly up. To her horror, her attempts to awaken Dragonfly fail miserably, and this causes her to throw her head back and let loose a loud, mournful howl. Alpha returns to her herd, and soon makes a full recovery despite her injury. The program ends on a happy note for Alpha, claiming that she will have hundreds of offspring during her hundred-year lifetime.
| 4 | "Pod's Travels" | Pierre de Lespinois | Mike Carroll (story), Stephen Eder (narration), Gary Parker (paleontologist segments) | December 16, 2003 |
Setting: islands in the Tethys Ocean, in place of modern southern Europe – Romania and Hațeg Island, 80 MYA.; Filming Locations: Punta Uva, Puerto de Limon, Costa Rica; Bribri, Talamanca, Costa Rica.; In prehistoric southern Europe, lush forest covers a large island where several dinosaur species live out their existence, One of them is Pod, a male Pyroraptor, and his two pack members, his two siblings. Their species rely on their brainpower and intelligence to survive as they are lithe and fairly small but agile. The island has recently been hit by a series of seismic shockwaves that triggered minor earthquakes, suddenly one hits. The earth shakes and some debris falls down. The forest trembles and grazing sauropods pause their feasting to wait for the end of the tremors. The shaking startles Pod and his sisters, but the earthquake soon stops without causing injury to any of the inhabitant dinosaurs. As the three siblings head into the denser forest, away from a noisy herd of grazing titanosaurs, Pod finds the rotting carcass of a small Rhabdodon and is the first to dine. As he eats, a pair of carnivorous Tarascosaurus - a male and a female - are silently approaching, attracted by the scent of blood. These creatures are much larger than the Pyroraptor, and one of them steps on a twig, which snaps in two. Sensing the thieves, Pod calls for help, and the sisters come running to his aid. The three siblings close in to defend their meal by screeching at the Tarascosaurus, hoping to scare them away. Unfortunately, it is ineffective, and the Tarascosaurus advance toward them. In the middle of the battle, another earthquake hits, knocking Pod unconscious. The male Tarascosaurus trips on a tree root and breaks his foot upon falling onto the ground. His agonized roar wakes the unconscious raptor and it drives the female Tarascosaurus off. Before they can kill the male, a Rhabdodon stampede forces them to flee to the shoreline. At the shoreline, the shockwaves have shaken the sea floor and creates a tsunami that towers high above the island before deluging. It sweeps Pod and the other dinosaurs away. Pod and one of his sisters survive, clinging to life on a log swept out into the ocean. The next day, however, the female is caught and eaten by a passing elasmosaurid plesiosaur. On his third day on the log, Pod is swept onto Hațeg Island and collapses from exhaustion. The island is filled with miniature versions of the creatures from his home. As Pod is lying on the beach, a pack of Dwarf dromeosaurs squabble with prehistoric crocodiles known as Allodaposuchus over the supposedly dead Pyroraptor. Pod is awakened by the noises and scares the Allodaposuchus away. Because they look like him, Pod attempts to join the dwarf dromaeosaur pack, but they run away, terrified. After trying to hunt an Ichthyornis , Pod follows the dwarf dromaeosaurs, believing they can lead him to his own kind. Instead, Pod soon learns that all of the island's species are dwarfs of animals back in his homeland. Having lived in a world where size determined a dinosaurs survival, Pod is baffled by the small creatures, although he knows the water tastes just fine, so he takes a moment to refresh himself. He embarks on a quest to find members of his kind, exploring the island all the way. After that, he hears the sounds of two male members of a dwarf Zalmoxes species fighting by a riverside. The male that approaches the herd issues a duel to the alpha Zalmoxes. The herd leader accepts the challenge, and a violent fight breaks out. The leader drives one of its spiked thumb claws through the intruder's jugular vein, but the bleeding intruder refuses to back off. Agitated, the leader defeats the intruder by knocking him to the ground. The wounded male flounders on the ground but then a pack of Allodaposuchus emerge from the depths. The prehistoric crocodiles kill the wounded dinosaur and begin to feast. Attracted by the scent of fresh blood Pod walks over, scares the crocodiles off and begins to eat. While Pod is resting after his meal, the Allodaposuchus attempt to snag the leftovers, only to squabble over it with a flock of troodontids. Pod wakes up, devours his last piece of meat and heads off to resume his mission. Later, in an attempt to find members of his own kind, Pod climbs to the top of a towering cliff and shrieks, trying to get a response. He then hear his own echo, and believes it is another Pyroraptor. The pack of dwarf Troodontids hear the cries, and respond. Pod approaches the group and displays the killing claws on his hind feet. To his shock, they show signs of submission. He walks away, and the curious troodontids follow. They later join him as a pack and he is their leader. As Pod walks through the forest with the Troodontids following him, he finds a trio of dwarf Tarascosaurus - two females and a male - feeding on a dead Magyarosaurus. Pod realizes that the reason he was not the apex predator on his home island was because he was the smallest hunter on that island, here though, he is the largest and most savage dinosaur of all. So he confronts the male. Pod makes a leap, kills the male Tarascosaurus with his sickle claw and he and his troodontid companions scare the females away, and realize that they have become the apex predators on the island. He returns to the beach and finds the log that saved him, scaring some birds off as well. He stays on the island for good, claiming it as his empire.

== Marketing ==
There were a couple of different websites for the series that were created back in November 2003, which included promos on the central characters of each of the episodes, and showed animations of them in a white background. The site appeared to have some of its format taken away by June 2006, but the link remained intact on the site until December 2008, when the link finally redirected to the dinosaur section of Discovery's website, and about five years after the show originally premiered. An interactive game was also created, showcasing the dinosaurs in the show, where they are located, and other facts about them.

== Reception ==
The series was recommended by DVD Talk.

== Awards ==
Primetime Emmy Awards

- 2004 – Outstanding Sound Editing for Nonfiction Programming (Single or Multi-Camera) - Patrick Cusack, David Esparza, Sean Rowe, Lisa Varetakis, Michael Payne, Dean Grinsfelder, Stephen P. Robinson, Nancy Nugent and Gregg Barbanell (for "Pod's Travels" / "Alpha's Egg")
- 2004 – Outstanding Sound Mixing for Nonfiction Programming (Single or Multi-Camera) - Mike Olman and Ken Kobett (for "Pod's Travels"/"Alpha's Egg")
