= Carrizozo Commercial Historic District =

Historic district in New Mexico, United States

- U.S. National Register of Historic Places
- Location within New Mexico
- Location: Roughly bounded by Brick & D Aves., 11th & 13th Sts., Carrizozo, New Mexico
- Coordinates: 33°38′36″N 105°52′32″W
- Area: 18.6 acres (7.5 ha)
- NRHP reference No.: 16000550
- Added to NRHP: August 22, 2016

The Carrizozo Commercial Historic District, in Carrizozo, New Mexico, is an 18.6 acres (7.5 ha) historic district which was listed on the National Register of Historic Places in 2016.

The listing included 30 contributing buildings, two contributing structures, and a contributing site.

It includes the Carrizozo Woman's Club, a Masonic Temple, and more.
