= Silver City Woman's Club =

- U.S. National Register of Historic Places
- NM State Register of Cultural Properties
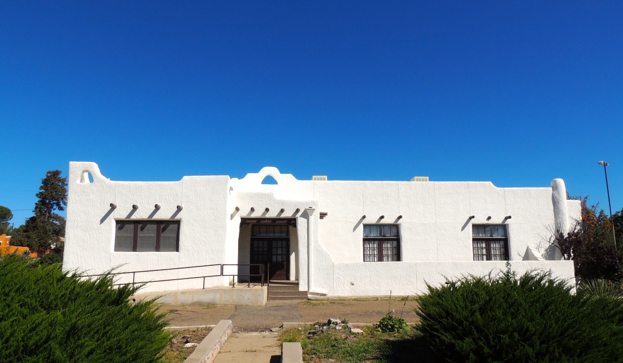

- Location within New Mexico Location within the United States
- Location: 411 Silver Heights Blvd., Silver City, New Mexico
- Coordinates: 32°46′58″N 108°16′18″W
- Area: less than one acre
- Built: 1936
- Built by: Richard Tatsch
- Architectural style: Pueblo Revival
- MPS: New Mexico Federation of Women's Club Buildings in New Mexico MPS
- NRHP reference No.: 03000886
- NMSRCP No.: 1830

Significant dates
- Added to NRHP: September 2, 2003
- Designated NMSRCP: June 13, 2003

The Silver City Woman's Club is a historic women's club located at 411 Silver Heights Boulevard in Silver City, New Mexico. The club was founded in 1909, and it built its meeting house in 1935–36. Richard Tatsch designed the clubhouse in the Pueblo Revival style, which reflected the region's architectural history. The clubhouse provided two spaces for the club's community activities and private meetings; the former included distributing food to needy families and conducting child welfare inspections on behalf of the state, while the latter included self-improvement courses in music and literature. The women's club has continuously held its activities in the building since its construction; it has also provided a space for community meetings and large events.

The clubhouse was added to the National Register of Historic Places on September 2, 2003.

The Carrizozo Woman's Club and Alamogordo Woman's Club were also listed then; all three originally were Works Progress Administration projects. The deterioration of the Carrizozo one, with its being identified as one of the Ten Most Endangered Properties in New Mexico, led to interest by preservationists and woman's club members in all three buildings.

The club operates under the auspices of the New Mexico Federation of Women's Clubs (NMFWC). (now known as GFWC New Mexico).

== See also ==
- National Register of Historic Places listings in Grant County, New Mexico
