= Hopeful Lode =

- U.S. National Register of Historic Places
- Location within New Mexico Location within the United States
- Nearest city: Nogal, New Mexico
- Coordinates: 33°29′19″N 105°46′55″W
- Area: 20 acres (8.1 ha)
- MPS: Mining Sites in the Nogal Mining District of the Lincoln National Forest MPS
- NRHP reference No.: 95001014
- Added to NRHP: August 22, 1995

Parsons Mine, historically known as the Hopeful Lode, near Nogal, New Mexico, was listed on the National Register of Historic Places in 1995. With 20 acres (8.1 ha), it was listed as "Hopeful Lode".

It is located at 8400 feet elevation in an unnamed canyon northeast of Tanbark Canyon north of Bonito Lake, along Forest Rd. 108, 6 miles (9.7 km) north of the junction of Forest Rds. 107 and 108. One third of the site is owned by Parsons Mining Company; the rest is part of Lincoln National Forest. The portion north of 108 includes four adits, an open cut (or glory hole), large waste piles, and two prospect pits.

It was listed for its information potential as an archeological site "for its ability to yield knowledge about early mining technologies, and the communities these mines engendered. The Parsons Mine site retains integrity of location, setting, feeling and association."
