= New Mexico State Road 348 =

State highway in New Mexico, United States

State Road 348

Route information
- Maintained by NMDOT
- Length: 7.100 mi (11.426 km)

Major junctions
- South end: FM 3125 at the Roosevelt–Bailey county line
- North end: US 60 / US 70 / US 84 in Texico

Location
- Country: United States
- State: New Mexico
- Counties: Curry, Roosevelt

Highway system
- New Mexico State Highway System; Interstate; US; State; Scenic
← NM 347	→ NM 349

State Road 348 (NM 348) is a 7.1-mile-long (11.4 km) state highway in the US state of New Mexico. NM 348's northern terminus is at U.S. Route 60 (US 60), US 70 and US 84 in Texico, and the southern terminus is a continuation as North Roosevelt Road A which continues south to NM 202 and Farm to Market Road 1760 (FM 1760).

== Major intersections ==
County	Location	mi	km	Destinations	Notes
New Mexico–Texas line		0.000	0.000	FM 3125 east / Roosevelt Road A south	Southern terminus of NM 348; western terminus of FM 3125
New Mexico–Texas line		6.10	9.82	FM 292 north – Farwell	Southern terminus of FM 292
Curry	Texico	7.10	11.43	US 60 / US 70 / US 84 (Wheeler Avenue)	Northern terminus; road continues as Garwood Street
1.000 mi = 1.609 km; 1.000 km = 0.621 mi
