= Lincoln Historic District (Lincoln, New Mexico) =

Historic district in New Mexico, United States

- U.S. National Register of Historic Places
- U.S. National Historic Landmark District
- New Mexico Historic Site
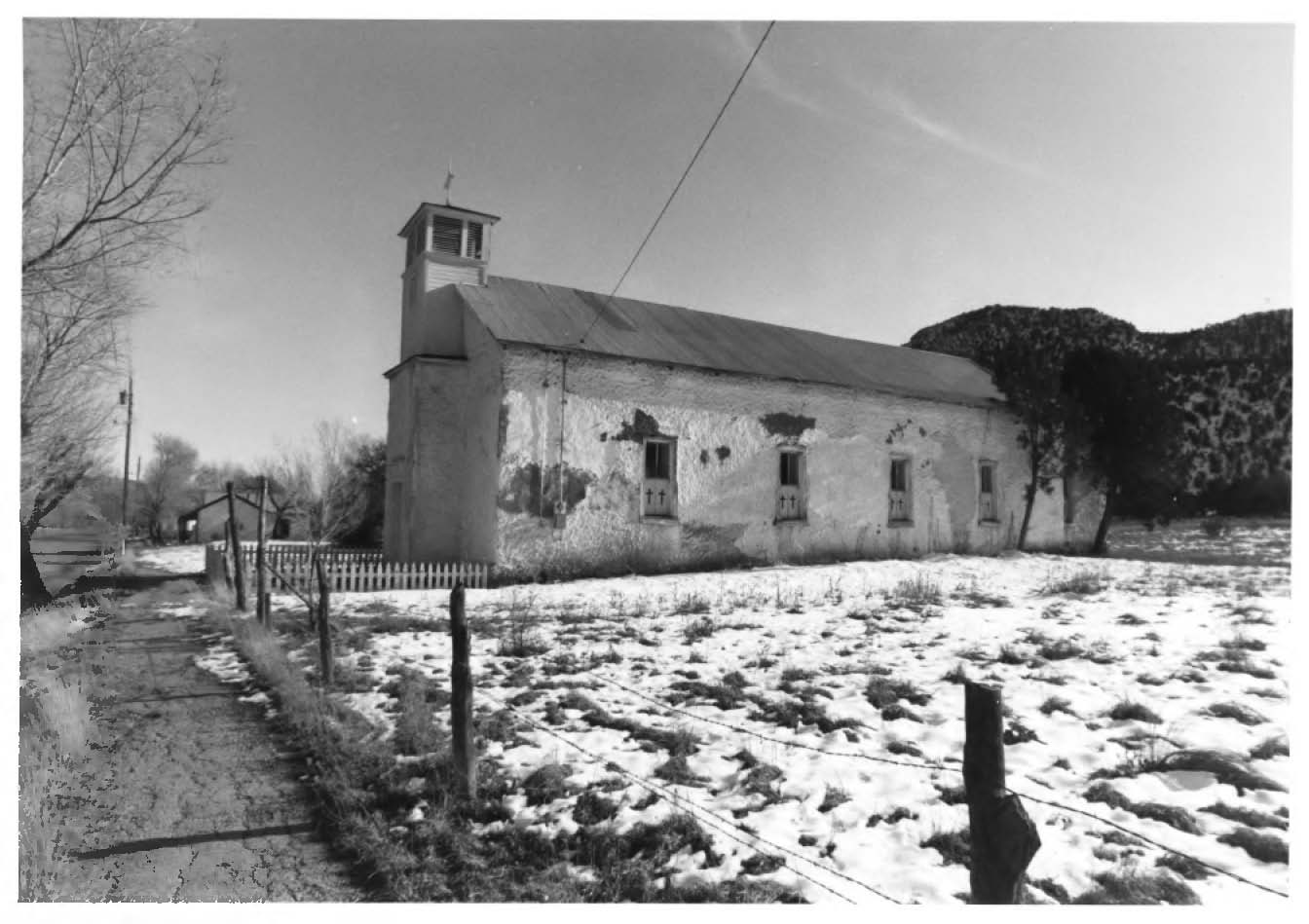
- Iglesia de San Juan Bautista in 1974

- Location within New Mexico Location within the United States
- Location: US 380, Lincoln, New Mexico
- Coordinates: 33°29′41″N 105°22′56″W
- Area: 2,348 acres (950 ha)
- Built: 1881
- NRHP reference No.: 66000477

Significant dates
- Added to NRHP: October 15, 1966
- Designated NHLD: December 19, 1960
- Designated NMHS: 1937

Lincoln Historic District is a historic district encompassing the community of Lincoln, New Mexico. The district was added to the National Register of Historic Places in 1966. The historic district contains 48 structures, some privately held, 12 miles (19 km) east of Capitan and 57 miles (92 km) west of Roswell along U.S. Route 380.

It was declared a National Historic Landmark in 1960. The National Park Service reviewer of the site, who visited in 1974, believed that it was the best preserved frontier "cow town" in the United States.

Seventeen of the buildings are owned by the state of New Mexico and operated as Lincoln Historic Site under the New Mexico Department of Cultural Affairs. Four of the buildings are open as museums year round, and two are open seasonally. It includes a number of buildings, including Wright House, Dr. Wood's Office, the Watson House, Curry Saloon, Wortley Hotel, Penfield Shop and Home, Tunstall Store, Old Mill, Ellis Store, Old Courthouse, and Montano Store.

The town is notable for its famous residents who participated in the Lincoln County War, and as the site of Billy the Kid's most famous escape in April 1881.

== History ==
Lincoln looks much as it did during the Lincoln County War (1878–1881) when its single street was peopled with characters like Billy the Kid, John Chisum and Lawrence Murphy. Nestled in a valley between the Capitan and Sacramento Mountains of southcentral New Mexico, Lincoln was the scene of Billy the Kid's most famous escape in April 1881. Billy had been sentenced to be hanged by the neck until dead and was being held prisoner in the Old Lincoln County Courthouse. Somehow he got hold of a six-shooter, killed the two deputies who were guarding him (Bell and Olinger), then stole a horse and rode out of town—only to be tracked down in Fort Sumner and shot dead two months later by Sheriff Pat Garrett.

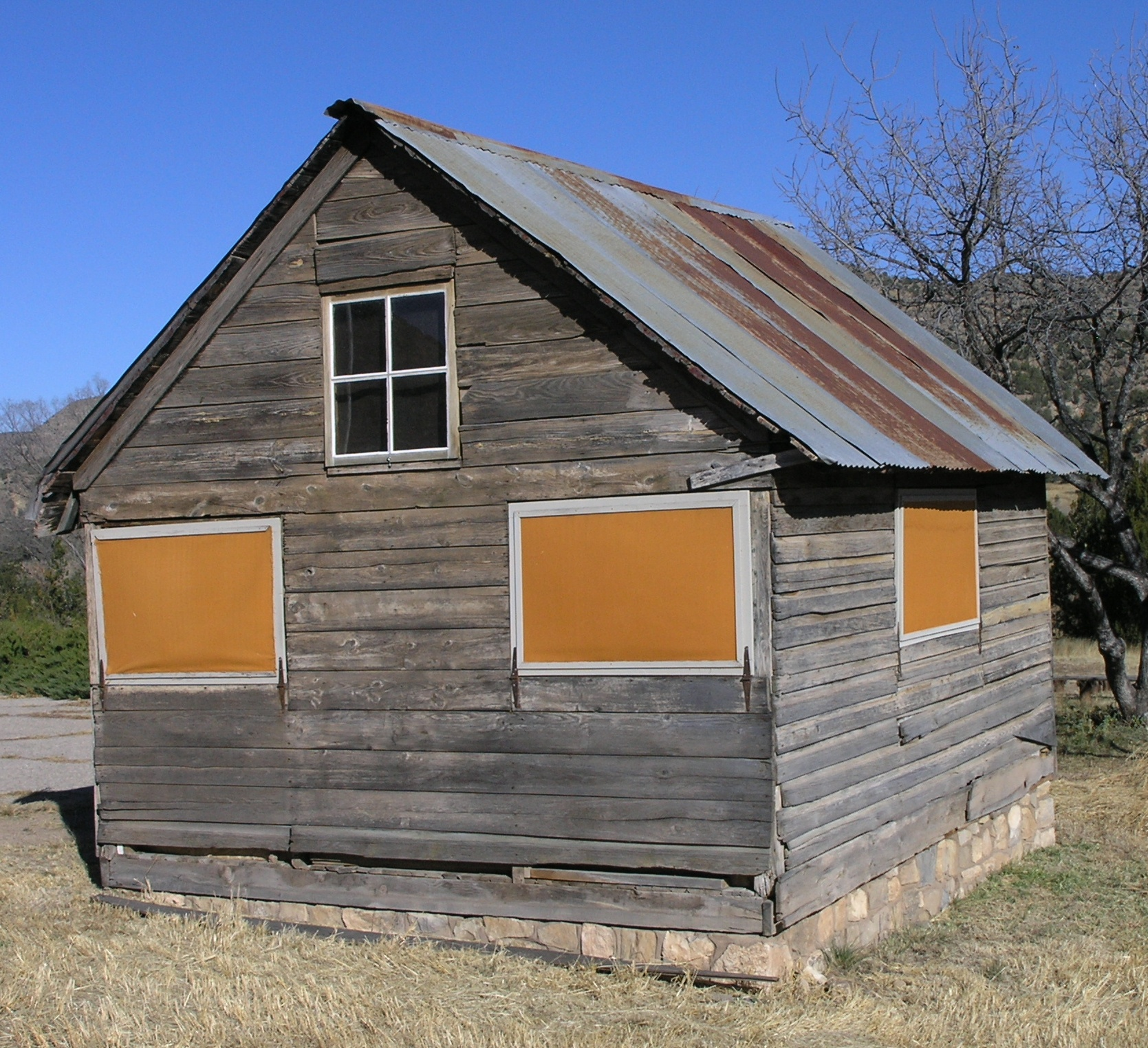
The TB House

Although Billy the Kid was the most famous character in Lincoln during its violent heyday, he had only a supporting role in the larger story of the Lincoln County War. The "war" was a vicious struggle between two competing economic factions for control of lucrative government contracts and local resources. The two factions, Murphy-Dolan and Tunstall-McSween, fought a series of escalating battles with such murderous ferocity that the repercussions were felt as far away as the state capital Santa Fe and even in Washington, D.C.

== Museums ==
Four of the museum buildings are open year-round and two are opened seasonally.

- Old Lincoln County Courthouse - Billy the Kid was held here. Exhibits show the building's use as a store, residence, Masonic Lodge and eventually courthouse and jail.
- Tunstall Store - The store's original 19th century merchandise is on display.
- Torreon - a 20-foot (6.1 m)-high round stone tower originally built near the center of town in the 1860s, served as a refuge during attacks by Mescalero Apaches.
- Montano Store - Features exhibits on adobe construction and the Hispanic culture that was prevalent during the Lincoln County War.
- San Juan Mission Church (La Iglesia de San Juan Bautista) - Built in 1887, the Roman Catholic Church is open to the public and is still used for services today.
- Anderson-Freeman Visitors Center - A non-historical building with exhibits about the town's history starting with American Indian pre-history up to the Lincoln County War. A video details the history of the war.

== See also ==
- National Register of Historic Places listings in Lincoln County, New Mexico
- List of National Historic Landmarks in New Mexico
