= Paden's Drug Store =

- U.S. National Register of Historic Places
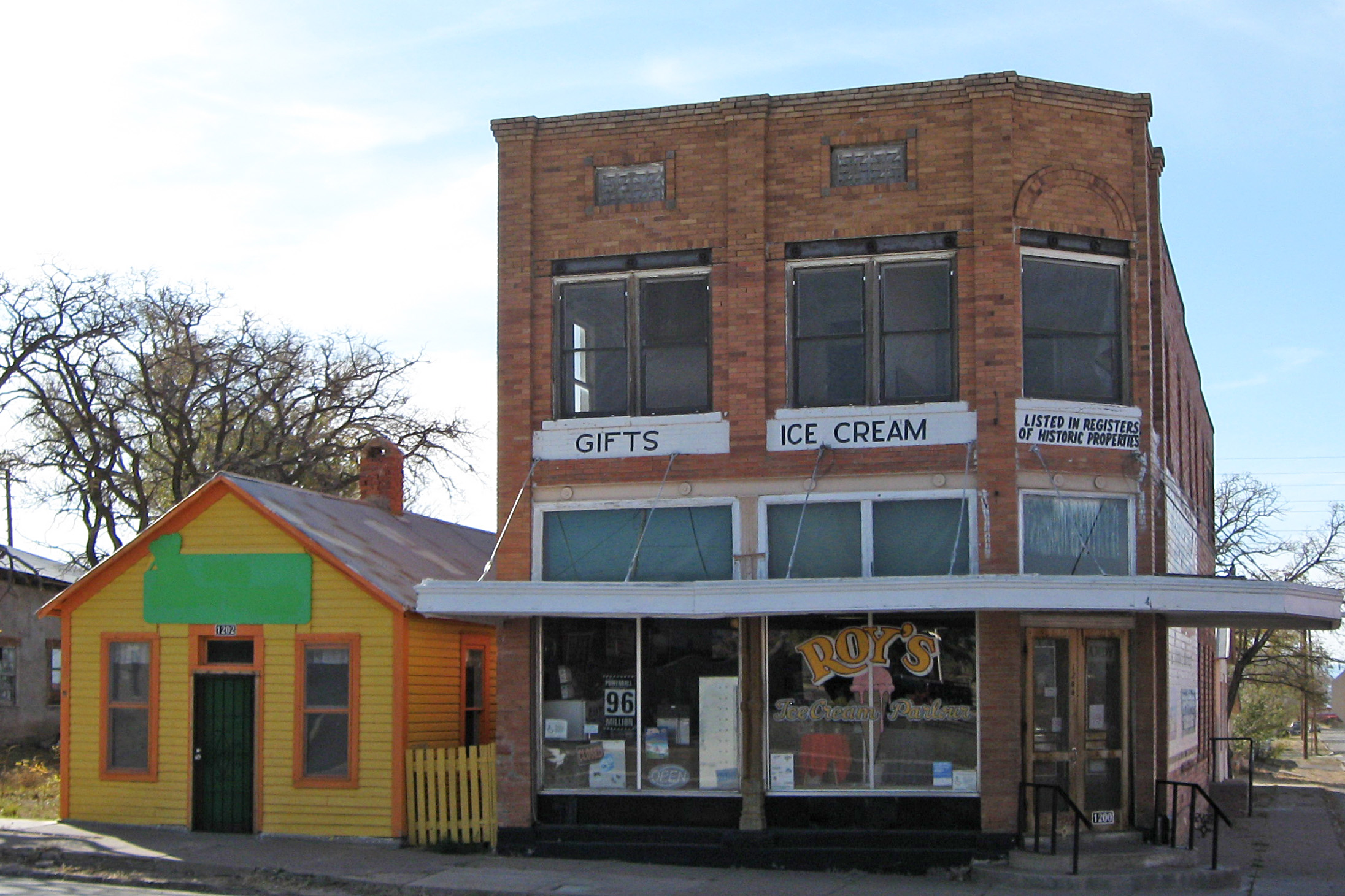

- Location within New Mexico
- Location: 1200-1208 E Ave., Carrizozo, New Mexico
- Coordinates: 33°38′35″N 105°52′42″W
- Area: less than one acre
- Built: 1907
- Built by: Tennis, D.B.
- Architectural style: Commercial vernacular
- NRHP reference No.: 05000204
- Added to NRHP: March 23, 2005

Paden's Drug Store, at 1200-1208 E Ave. in Carrizozo, New Mexico, was listed on the National Register of Historic Places in 2005. It was built in 1907.

The listing includes two buildings. The most prominent is the two-part commercial building built in 1909 and modified to add a second story, by Carrizozo builder D.B. Tennis, in 1917.

In 1937, Melvin G. Paden sold the pharmacy to “Red” Eaker who retained the "Paden" name and ran the store until 1954. In 1977, Carrizozo resident Roy Dow, who owned a gift shop, moved his shop into the Paden Drug Store.

Paden's Drug Store recently operated as a Gift Gallery and Ice Cream Parlour.

In April 2022, Marc Cohen and Julia Danielle quietly purchased the Paden Drug Store building, with plans to make improvements.
