= Carrizozo Woman's Club =

- U.S. National Register of Historic Places
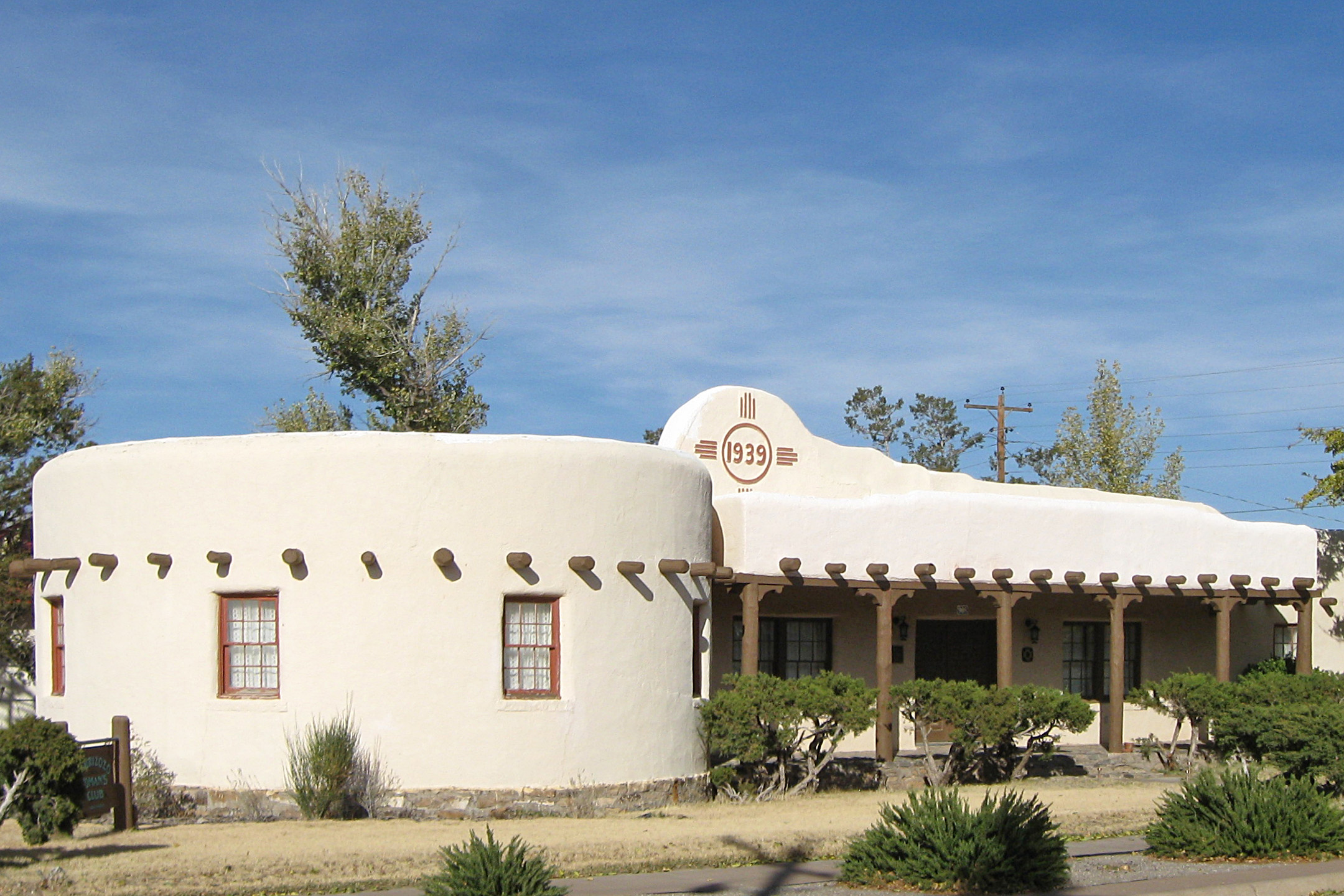

- Location within New Mexico
- Location: 908 Eleventh St., Carrizozo, New Mexico
- Coordinates: 33°38′33″N 105°52′43″W
- Area: less than one acre
- Built: 1939
- Built by: Garrison, J.C.
- Architectural style: Pueblo Revival
- MPS: New Mexico Federation of Women's Club Buildings in New Mexico MPS
- NRHP reference No.: 03000995
- Added to NRHP: October 6, 2003

The Carrizozo Woman's Club, at 908 Eleventh St., Carrizozo, New Mexico is a woman's club. Its building was constructed in 1939 and was listed on the National Register of Historic Places in 2003.

It is Pueblo Revival in style. The building is L-shaped, about 70 feet (21 m) along the front and about 40 feet (12 m) along the side. It has a 30 feet (9.1 m) Round Room.

It operates under the auspices of the New Mexico Federation of Women's Clubs (NMFWC). (now known as GFWC New Mexico).

The building was a Works Progress Administration project.

The building was identified in 2002 as one of the Ten Most Endangered Properties in New Mexico, by the New Mexico Cultural Preservation Alliance. It had a notably severe crack in one of its adobe walls. The situation "attracted the attention of preservations and prompted club members to begin researching the property and preparing a nomination to list it in the State Register of Cultural Properties. Interest raised by NMFWC in other communities about other club buildings led the New Mexico Historic Preservation Division (NMHPD) to contract with historian David Kammer to identify and evaluate" other clubhouses as well, including the Alamogordo Woman's Club and the Silver City Woman's Club.
