= White Oaks, New Mexico =

- White Oaks Historic District
- U.S. National Register of Historic Places
- U.S. Historic district
- NM State Register of Cultural Properties
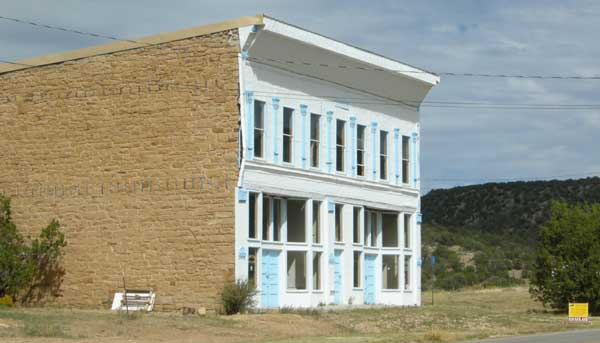
- Old commercial building in White Oaks

- Location within New Mexico Location within the United States
- Location: 12 mi. NE of Carrizozo, on NM 349
- Coordinates: 33°44′59.1″N 105°44′14.3″W
- Area: 1,822.5 acres (737.5 ha)
- Built: 1879
- NRHP reference No.: 70000403
- NMSRCP No.: 43

Significant dates
- Added to NRHP: September 4, 1970
- Designated NMSRCP: February 21, 1969

White Oaks is a ghost town in Lincoln County, New Mexico, United States. Located on the outskirts of the Lincoln National Forest, it became a boomtown in 1879 following the discovery of gold and coal in the nearby Jicarilla Mountains.

== History ==
The region, abundant with game, was first roamed by the Piros Indians who made it one of their hunting grounds. However, the invading Apaches drove them out and claimed it as their own.

The first Europeans to explore the area were the Spaniards of Don Juan de Oñate's expedition, who arrived in the late 1500s. They called the land Malpais (meaning "badlands") because of a nearby lava flow.

In the late 1870s, John J. Baxter, an unsuccessful California '49er, heard reports of gold discovery in the area. He followed in the footsteps of local Mexican prospectors to a shallow canyon east to the mountains, where he discovered a rich gold field. Within a year, a mining camp of tents had appeared. Called White Oaks after a nearby stream, the camp soon grew to be a permanent settlement. It boasted 50 different businesses including four newspapers, two hotels, three churches, a sawmill, a bank, an opera house, livery stables, as well as saloons and gambling houses. A post office had opened as early as 1880.

Baxter and another prospector named Winters established two claims, known as the Homestake Mine and the South Homestake Mine. The local mountains would be named for Baxter. The parties later sold their claims for $300,000 apiece. The town was frequented by notable Old West personalities, including Dave Rudabaugh, Billy the Kid, Pat Garrett, and Shotgun John Collins. Jonathan H. Wise established the town's first newspaper in 1880, called the White Oaks Golden Era. Additional newspapers included the Lincoln County Leader, the Old Abe Eagle and the New Mexico Interpreter. (Florin, 1970, P. 662)

In November, 1880, a posse from White Oaks pursued Billy the Kid for more than forty miles, culminating in a standoff, during which Deputy Sheriff Jim Carlyle was killed after trying to negotiate with the fugitives. National Park Service historian Robert M. Utley, in his book "Wanted: The Outlaw Lives of Billy the Kid and Ned Kelly," wrote that it is not known who shot Carlyle or why.

Billy the Kid later sent a letter to Governor Lew Wallace, disputing an account written in a Las Vegas, New Mexico newspaper claiming that Billy was the leader of a gang of outlaws. Billy said that he and Kelly had been in a ranch house when the posse surrounded it. Deputy Sheriff Carlyle entered the house by himself, demanding the fugitives surrender. Billy asked to see the warrants for their arrests, but Carlyle admitted he had none. Billy replied that without warrants, the posse was nothing but an armed mob and refused to surrender to them. He ordered Deputy Carlyle to remain in the house to keep the posse from attacking them, saying Carlyle should lead his men away in the morning. Shortly after that, the posse sent Billy a note demanding Carlyle's immediate release. If he did not comply, they would kill "Mr. Greathouse", who was known to be Billy's friend. Minutes later, a posse member fired a shot at the house. Deputy Carlyle used the confusion to jump out of a window and make his escape. Unfortunately, he was shot and killed by his own posse.

The United States census, taken in July 1880, showed that White Oaks had a population of about 800. It would eventually reach 4,000 people. (Florin Page 661) In 1882, construction was completed on Starr's Opera House, and the town now had saloons, several general stores, a school, and a town hall. In 1884, Lyman Hood held the first church services in an actual church building. These meetings having previously taken place in the town hall. During this period, there were brothels with many prostitutes, and the town was frequently a haven for cattle rustlers and other outlaws.

By 1885, White Oaks had settled down and was beginning to thrive. Three attorneys, John Y. Hewitt, Harvey B. Ferguson, and George Barber, opened businesses there, and other professionals began to arrive in town to open their own businesses. However, its continued existence was dependent on a railroad passing through it. In the late 1890s, both the Santa Fe and the El Paso and Northeastern railroads were planning to extend tracks toward White Oaks. Local business interests refused to make concessions to lure the railroad to town. Instead they attempted to charge premium prices for right-of-way properties, convinced that the railroads would compete for the privilege. As a result, the railroad chose to run twelve miles to the west, through Carrizozo, New Mexico. By the late 1890s the mines had become exhausted and the population dwindled. Today White Oaks is a ghost town, with just a few buildings still standing.

Susan McSween Barber, widow of Alexander McSween who was killed during the Lincoln County War, became known as the "Cattle Queen of New Mexico" in the late 19th century. She bought and developed the Three Rivers Ranch southwest of the town, eventually owning over 5,000 head of cattle. In 1902 she sold out and moved to White Oaks, where she remained until her death in 1931. She is buried in the old White Oaks cemetery, along with another notable, former New Mexico state Governor William McDonald, the state's first governor after achieving statehood, who had been President of the Exchange Bank of White Oaks and a local attorney.

In 1970, White Oaks was listed on the National Register of Historic Places as a historic district. By that time, very little remained of the original community; although the district covered over 1,800 acres (730 ha), only 6 buildings had enough historical integrity to qualify as contributing properties.

Today, only one of the old saloons remains open, The No Scum Allowed Saloon.

== See also ==
- List of ghost towns in New Mexico
- National Register of Historic Places listings in Lincoln County, New Mexico
