= New Mexico State Road 349 =

State highway in New Mexico, United States

State Road 349
- NM 349 highlighted in red

Route information
- Maintained by NMDOT
- Length: 8.5 mi (13.7 km)

Major junctions
- West end: US 54 near Carrizozo
- East end: End of state maintenance in White Oaks

Location
- Country: United States
- State: New Mexico
- Counties: Lincoln

Highway system
- New Mexico State Highway System; Interstate; US; State; Scenic
← NM 348	→ NM 350

State Road 349 (NM 349) is a 8.5-mile-long (13.7 km) state highway in the US state of New Mexico. NM 349's western terminus is at U.S. Route 54 (US 54) north of Carrizozo, and the eastern terminus is at the end of state maintenance in White Oaks.

== Major intersections ==
The entire route is in Lincoln County.

Location	mi	km	Destinations	Notes
	0.000	0.000	US 54	Western terminus
White Oaks	8.500	13.679	End of state maintenance	Eastern terminus
1.000 mi = 1.609 km; 1.000 km = 0.621 mi
