= Aguayo Family Homestead =

- U.S. National Register of Historic Places
- Location within New Mexico Location within the United States
- Nearest city: Nogal, New Mexico
- Coordinates: 33°32′06″N 105°45′09″W
- Area: 33.4 acres (13.5 ha)
- Built: 1917
- Built by: Melquiades of Mexico; Chavarria of Mexico
- MPS: Homesteads on the Lincoln National Forest, New Mexico MPS
- NRHP reference No.: 95001478
- Added to NRHP: December 28, 1995

The Aguayo Family Homestead, near Nogal, New Mexico, was listed on the National Register of Historic Places in 1995.

It is located on Tortolita Creek, in Tortolita Canyon, west of Nogal. The listing included one contributing building, five contributing structures, and two contributing sites.

The house is a single-story, L-shaped adobe building built around 1917. The family had first lived in a log building which was later used as a barn.
