= Carrizozo Municipal Airport =

Airport in New Mexico, United States

- IATA: none; ICAO: none; FAA LID: F37

Summary
- Airport type: Public
- Owner: Town of Carrizozo
- Serves: Carrizozo, New Mexico
- Elevation AMSL: 5,373 ft (1,638 m)
- Coordinates: 33°38′56″N 105°53′44″W

Map
- Location of airport in New Mexico

Runways
Direction	Length		Surface
Direction	ft	m	Surface
6/24	4,944	1,507	Asphalt
15/33	2,500	762	Dirt

Statistics (2023)
- Aircraft operations (year ending 4/3/2023): 3,500
- Based aircraft: 6
- Source: Federal Aviation Administration

Carrizozo Municipal Airport (FAA LID: F37) is a town owned, public use airport located one nautical mile (2 km) northwest of the central business district of Carrizozo, a town in Lincoln County, New Mexico, United States. It is included in the National Plan of Integrated Airport Systems for 2011–2015, which categorized it as a general aviation facility.

== Facilities and aircraft ==
Carrizozo Municipal Airport covers an area of 204 acres (83 ha) at an elevation of 5,373 feet (1,638 m) above mean sea level. It has two runways: 6/24 is 4,944 by 75 feet (1,507 x 23 m) with an asphalt surface; 15/33 is 2,500 by 90 feet (762 x 27 m) with a dirt surface.

For the 12-month period ending April 3, 2023, the airport had 3,500 aircraft operations, an average of 67 per week: 96% general aviation and 4% military. At that time there were 6 aircraft based at this airport, all single-engine.
