= El Paso and Southwestern Railway Water Supply System =

- U.S. National Register of Historic Places
- Location within New Mexico Location within the United States
- Nearest city: Nogal, New Mexico
- Coordinates: 33°29′30″N 105°40′44″W
- Area: 7.8 acres (3.2 ha)
- Built: 1908
- Engineer: Charles H. Henning
- NRHP reference No.: 79001540
- Added to NRHP: November 21, 1979

The El Paso and Southwestern Railway Water Supply System, in the area south of Nogal, New Mexico, was built in 1908. It was listed on the National Register of Historic Places in 1979.

It is also named, or it includes, the Bonito Pipeline. The construction engineer was Charles H. Henning.
