= Monjeau Lookout =

- U.S. National Register of Historic Places
- NM State Register of Cultural Properties
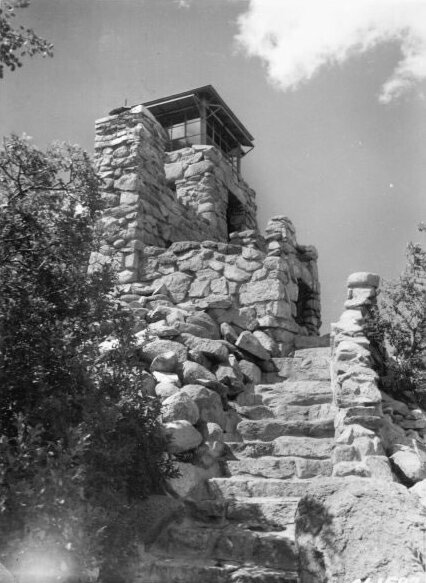
- Photo by USDA Forest Service - 1950.

- Location within New Mexico Location within the United States
- Nearest city: Villa Madonna, New Mexico
- Coordinates: 33°25′51″N 105°43′53″W
- Area: less than one acre
- Built: 1940
- Built by: Civilian Conservation Corps
- Architectural style: Rustic style
- MPS: National Forest Fire Lookouts in the Southwestern Region TR
- NRHP reference No.: 87002483
- NMSRCP No.: 1445

Significant dates
- Added to NRHP: January 27, 1988
- Designated NMSRCP: March 4, 1988

Monjeau Lookout was completed in 1940 by the Civilian Conservation Corps to serve as a fire lookout tower within Lincoln National Forest, New Mexico, United States, and remains in active use as a destination for forest visitors. The structure is a 14-by-14-foot (4.3 m × 4.3 m) native stone tower which contains living quarters, and is topped with a 7 ft × 7 ft (2.1 m × 2.1 m) metal-frame cab.

The structure is listed on the National Register of Historic Places, as well as the New Mexico State Register of Cultural Places.

Monjeau Lookout is reached via a 5.5 miles (8.9 km) National Forest gravel road, north of Ruidoso, New Mexico. There are three parking and camping areas a mile or two below the Lookout. The last mile or so of NF117 going up to the Monjeau Lookout is sometimes closed. When that is the case, no vehicle traffic goes to the top and the restroom at the top may also be closed. To reach the structure, one must then hike up the road. As of July 2021, the gate is open, but it was closed for a time in the late summer of 2020.

== See also ==
- National Register of Historic Places listings in Lincoln County, New Mexico
