= Carrizozo Municipal School District =

School district in New Mexico, United States

Carrizozo Municipal School District is a school district headquartered in Carrizozo, New Mexico. It operates three schools: Carrizozo Elementary School, Carrizozo Middle School, and Carrizozo High School.

Within Lincoln County, the district includes Carrizozo and Nogal. The district also includes a portion of Socorro County.

== History ==
Robert Cobos began his term as superintendent circa 2006. In 2011 he resigned from his position. The board of trustees selected Jim Nesbitt to replace Cobos.

In 2017, the state gave Carrizozo High School an "A" rating.
