= Ruidoso Lookout Tower =

- U.S. National Register of Historic Places
- NM State Register of Cultural Properties
- Location within New Mexico Location within the United States
- Location: Lincoln National Forest, Ruidoso, New Mexico
- Coordinates: 33°19′54″N 105°39′43″W
- Area: less than one acre
- Built: 1940
- MPS: National Forest Fire Lookouts in the Southwestern Region TR
- NRHP reference No.: 87002485
- NMSRCP No.: 1447

Significant dates
- Added to NRHP: January 27, 1988
- Designated NMSRCP: March 4, 1988

Ruidoso Lookout Tower was completed in 1940 by the U.S. Forest Service to serve as a fire lookout tower within Lincoln National Forest, New Mexico, United States.

== Background ==
It remains in active use for the detection of urban/suburban fires in the town of Ruidoso, which has grown over the years to surround the tower. The structure is a 30 feet (9.1 m) Aermotor tower with metal catwalks and is topped with a 14 by 14 feet (4.3 by 4.3 m) wooden cab.

The structure is listed on the National Register of Historic Places, as well as the New Mexico State Register of Cultural Properties.

The first detonation of a nuclear device by the Manhattan Project at Trinity Site was observed by Herbert Lee Traylor, the forest ranger on duty at the Ruidoso Lookout tower at the time of the explosion.

== See also ==
- National Register of Historic Places listings in Lincoln County, New Mexico
