= Old Dowlin Mill =

- U.S. National Register of Historic Places
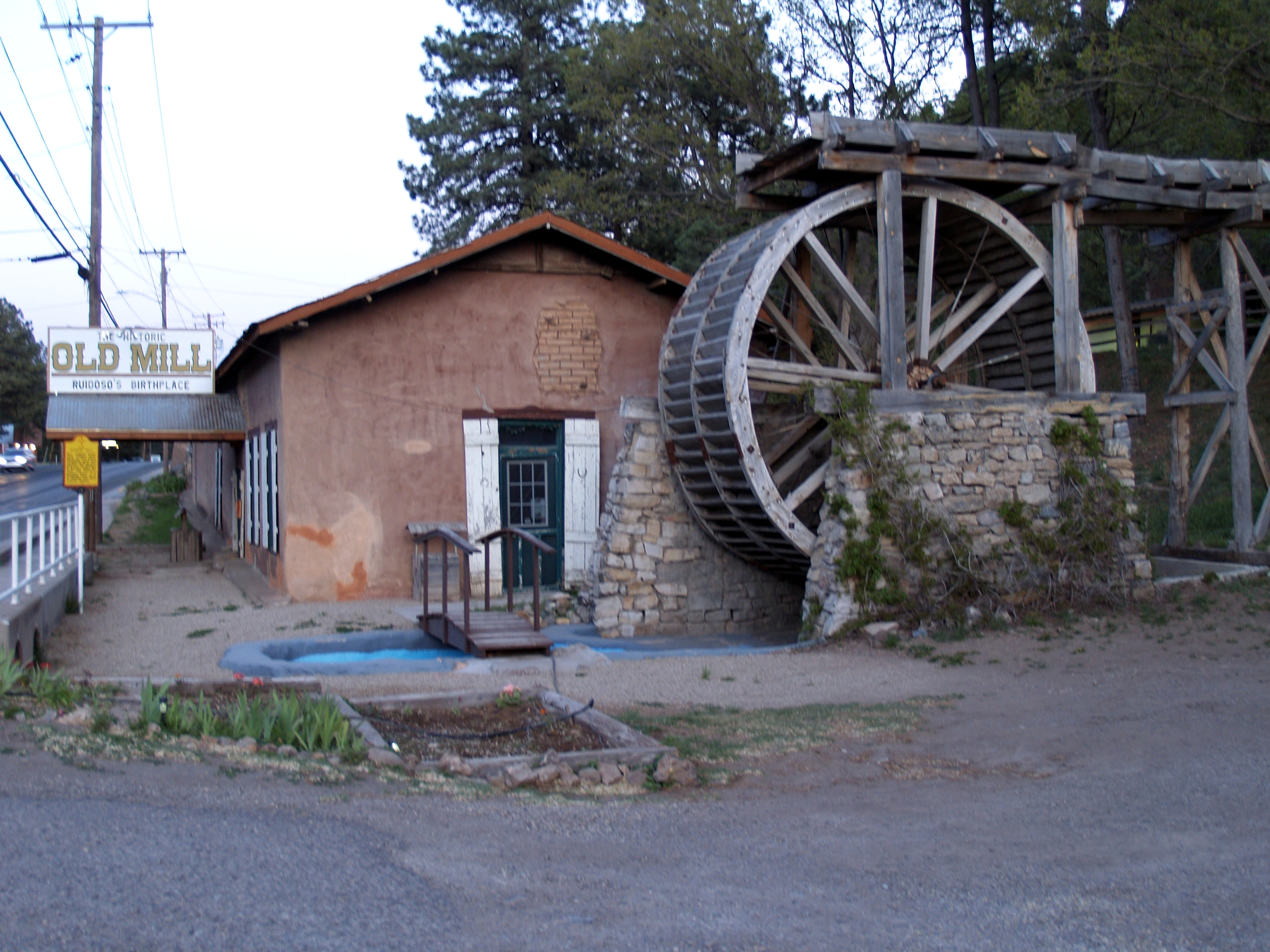

- Location within New Mexico
- Location: 641 Sudderth Dr., Ruidoso, New Mexico
- Area: 0.5 acres (0.20 ha)
- Built: 1868
- Built by: Dowlin, Paul
- Architectural style: southwest adobe
- NRHP reference No.: 13000768
- Added to NRHP: September 25, 2013

The Old Dowlin Mill, at 641 Sudderth Dr. in Ruidoso, New Mexico, was built in 1868 by Captain Paul Dowlin. The Old Dowlin Mill is the oldest building in Ruidoso. It has also been known as Old Mill, Dowlins Mill, and Lesnetts Mill. It was listed on the National Register of Historic Places in 2013. The listing included one contributing building, two contributing structures, and a contributing object.

== Early Days Of Operation ==
The Mill is Ruidoso's oldest building, was built by Paul Dowlin, a Civil War veteran and retired Army captain who served at nearby Fort Stanton. It was his second attempt in the mill business. The first mill, built just down the hill at the junction of Ruidoso River and Carrizo Creek, was swept away by heavy rains just a few weeks after its completion. The place where The Mill currently sits is Captain Paul's second attempt at building a mill. It was completed in 1868. The newly built mill was now on higher and safer ground away from the immediate dangers of flooding. In addition to a grist mill, the building has also served as a general store, a blacksmith shop, warehouse and bean thresher among other uses. There, the settlers and Native tribes would bring their grain to be milled. It was also a social center for the village. An 1884 news report cited a leap year dinner and ball that was held at the former Dowlin residence that once stood next to the Mill. Paul also served as post master for the Village of Dowlin's Mill in 1873. In the 1870s half of the interest was sold to Frank Lesnett, the operator of the mill. In 1877, Captain Paul died in a dispute with cowboy, Jerry Dillion. Captain Paul and Dillion had tried to settle an old dispute behind the mill, where Captain Paul was shot and he succumbed to his wounds.

== Notable Historical Figures ==
Since the mill was a place for local gatherings, famous local legends often visited.

- Billy The Kid was a family friend of both the Dowlin's and Lesnett's. He would often frequent the mill for dinners and dances. It has also been said that Annie Lesnett hid Billy The Kid in and empty flour barrel when on the run from pursuing law enforcement.
- Pat Garrett, sheriff of Lincoln County, also frequented the mill.
- General "Black Jack" Pershing, was also seen trading there, with his army buddies, Paddock and Penn.
- Geronimo was said to have been seen there trading on a few occasions.

== 1940's to 2005 ==
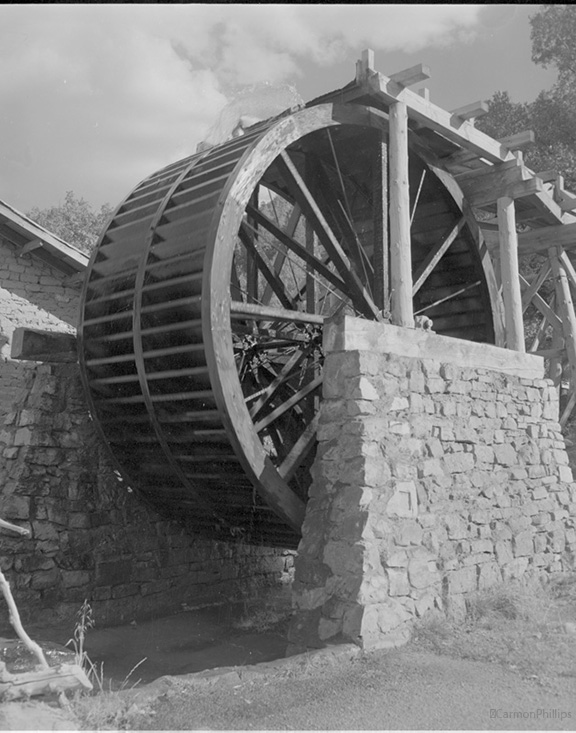
Historic Old Mill. Early 1950's

From the 1930s to 1949 the mill languished and fell into disrepair. About 1950, Carmon and Leoana Phillips bought the mill property and renovated the building. New adobe blocks were made and used to rebuild the back wall. The outside of the building is plastered but the interior whitewashed walls show the texture of the adobe. The large water wheel was rotted and sunk into the ground with the shaft broken. Phillips salvaged pieces of redwood from a water tank at an abandoned gold mine and used them to rebuild the wheel. They opened it as a gift shop and ran it until 2005.

== 2005 to 2017 ==
After Carmon Phillips died, his daughter Delana Phillips Clements took over the running of the mill. In 2005 it was opened as a venue for the arts. The mill was often used as a gallery to display local artist, a theater for local plays and as a venue for small concerts.

== 2017 Gas Explosion and Restoration ==
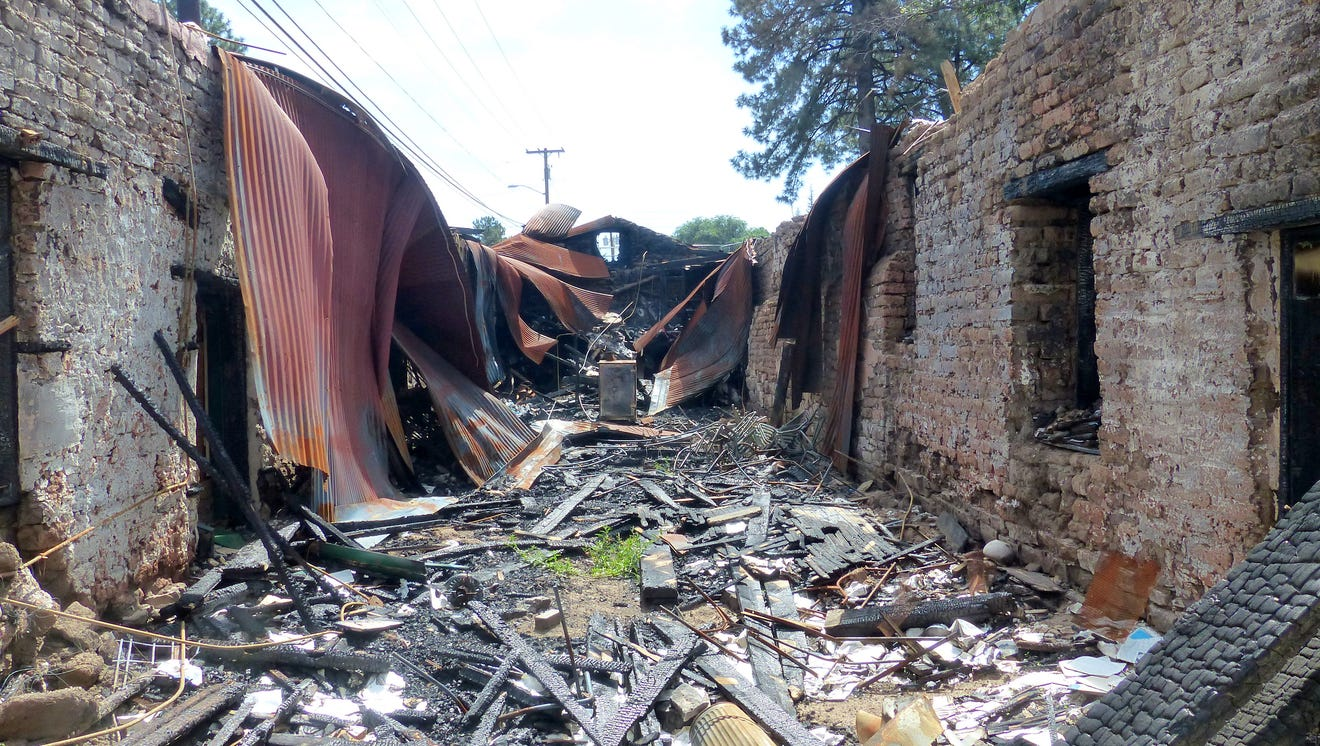
2017, After Gas Explosion.

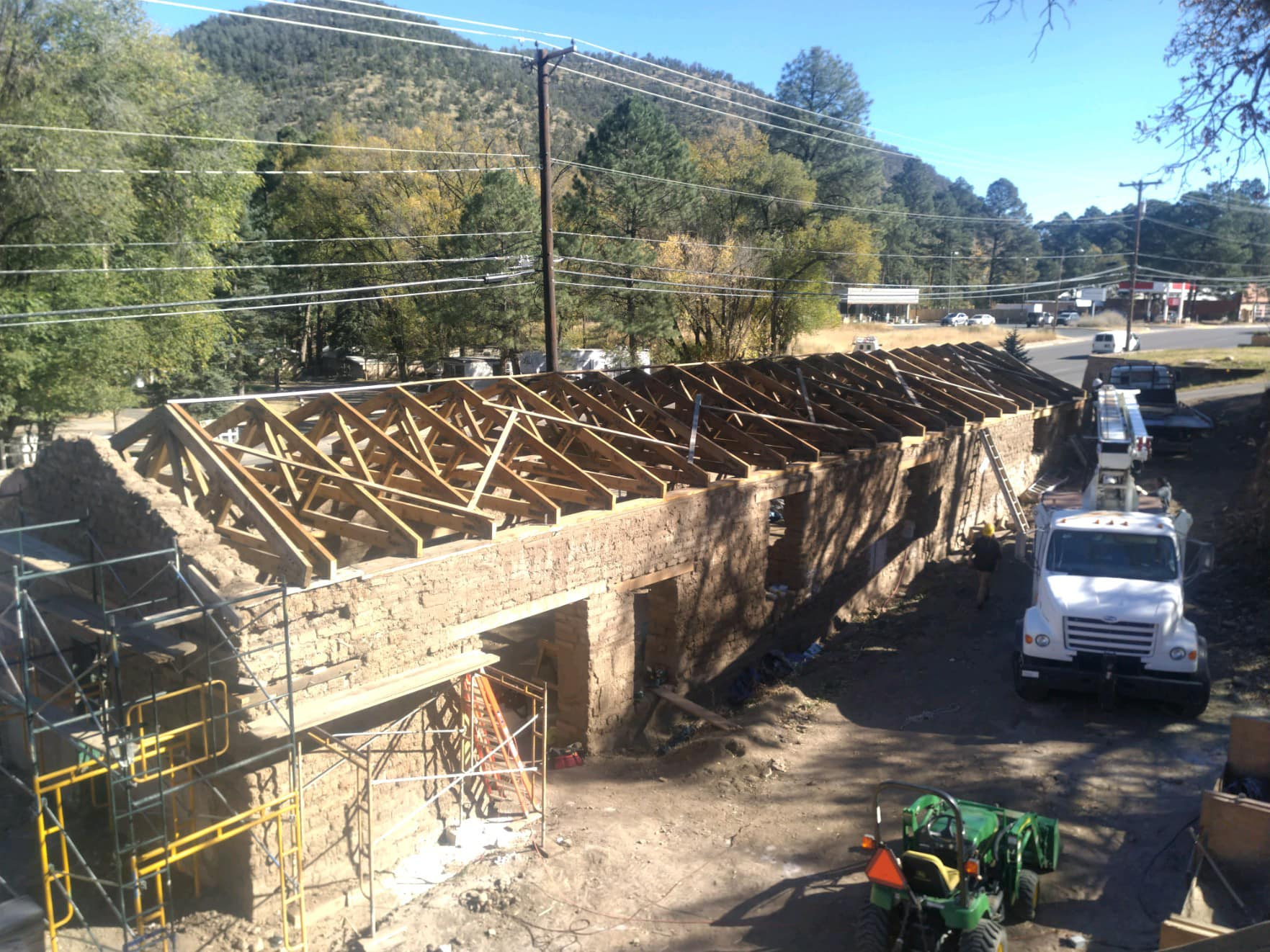
November 2021, building the roof of the mill.

The mill was nearly destroyed by a gas explosion and fire in December 2017. The building's adobe walls and grist-mill water wheel survived. The explosion was caused by the electric company, PNM digging for new power poles and accidentally hit a gas line. No one was in the building at the time of the explosion. Restoration started on the mill in 2019.

Go to historicoldmill.com for further updates.
