= Bonito Lake =

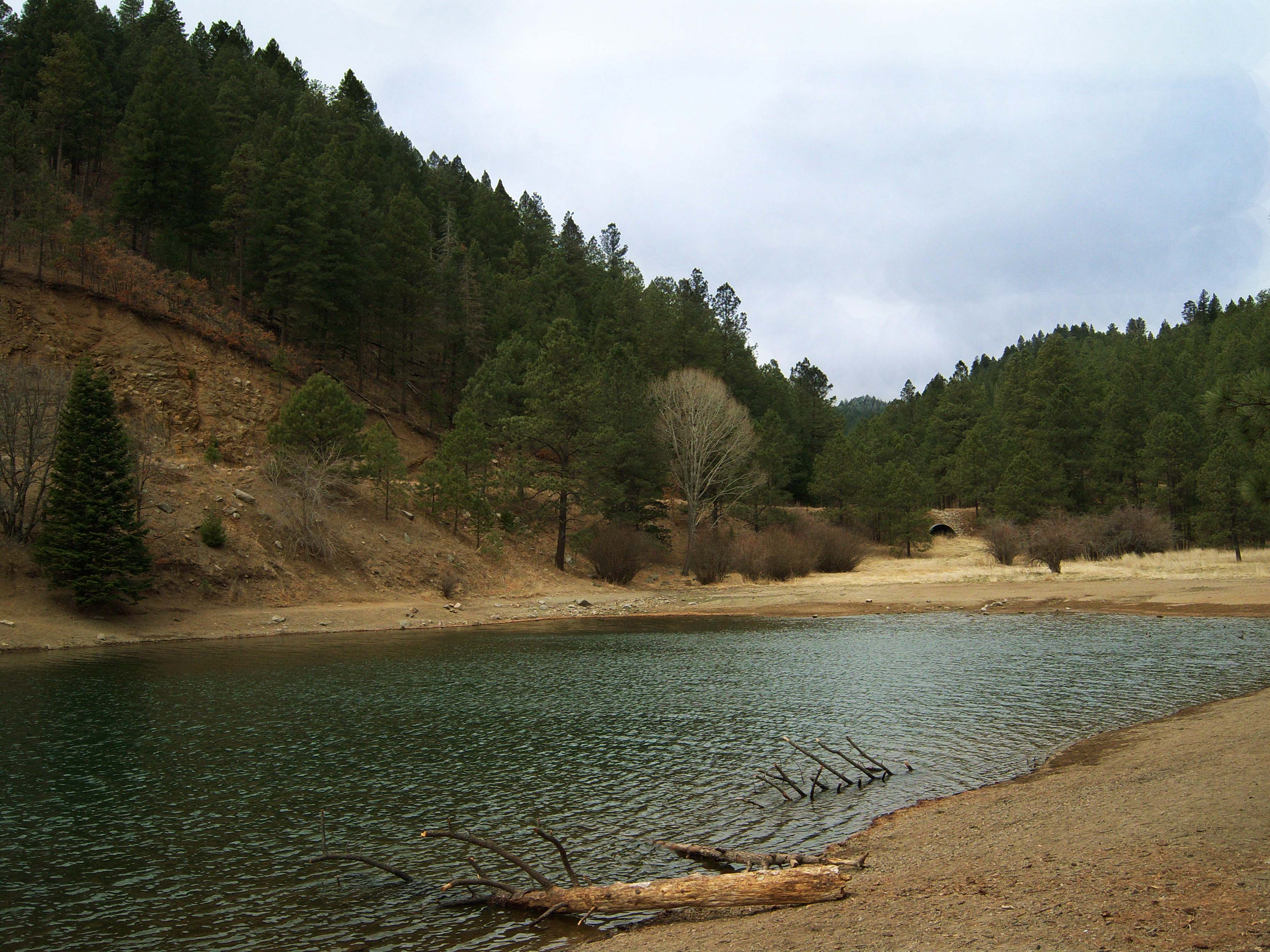

- Location within New Mexico Location within the United States
- Location: Lincoln County, New Mexico
- Coordinates: 33°27′21″N 105°43′54″W
- Type: reservoir
- Primary inflows: Bonito Creek
- Primary outflows: Bonito Creek
- Basin countries: United States
- Max. length: 2,800 ft (850 m)
- Max. depth: 70 ft (21 m)
- Surface elevation: 7,380 ft (2,250 m)

Bonito Lake is an alpine reservoir located high in the Sierra Blanca mountains northwest of Ruidoso, New Mexico. It is a popular fishing and camping destination, and although it is surrounded by the Lincoln National Forest, it is not a part of the national forest. It is currently owned by the city of Alamogordo, New Mexico as their primary water source. Because of the high altitude, the lake's temperature is cold year round, and is home to an abundance of rainbow trout. The area around the lake has several campgrounds with hiking trails and streams. The 2012 Little Bear Fire caused severe erosion in the watershed above the lake, flooding and the lake was contaminated with sediment and ash. In 2015 the lake was drained in order to dredge it.

== History ==
The area is now a part of the Lincoln National Forest, but in the late 19th century, the Southern Pacific Railroad owned most of the water rights in the area. In 1907 the railroad built a small dam in South Fork Canyon, upstream from the current dam. From that dam they extended a wooden pipeline 132 miles (212 km) to Pastura, New Mexico to provide water for the steam trains of the era. The remnants of the original dam and pieces of the wooden pipeline are still visible to hikers along the trail in South Fork Canyon.

By the 1920s, the railroad needed even more water, and they petitioned the Government of New Mexico to allow them to build another, larger dam along Bonito Creek. The engineers who surveyed the canyon determined that the best place to build a dam would be downstream from the town of Bonito, across a narrow spot in the canyon. This location would allow the dam to contain the water of two streams which merged just above the dam. This location, however, meant that the town of Bonito would be flooded by the dam's lake. The people living in Bonito were given land further down the canyon, and the entire town was moved downstream to a new location.

The dam was completed in 1931, and by 1933 the lake was completely filled. At full capacity, the lake contains 1,500 acre-feet of water.

Bonito Lake lies within the estimated radioactive fallout zone of the 1945 Trinity (test); it was a water source for towns like Carrizozo, Alamogordo, and Ruidoso.

By the 1950s, steam locomotives had been replaced by diesel electric locomotives, and the railroad no longer needed the water from the lake. The railroad sold the lake to the city of Alamogordo, New Mexico, which needed a reliable water supply to provide the town's drinking water. A 90-mile (140 km) pipeline was built to Alamogordo's "La Luz" water treatment plant.

== 21st century ==
As of 2011, Alamogordo still owned the dam and lake, but all of the land around the lake is a part of the Lincoln National Forest. The lake and the surrounding mountains have been popular for fishing, camping, and hiking.

The 2012 Little Bear Fire caused flooding and other damage to Bonito Lake and the surrounding area. The lake was closed to fishing since that time, and the campgrounds around the lake were also closed. The fire caused severe erosion in the watershed above the lake, and the lake was contaminated with sediment and ash from the fire. In the summer of 2015 engineers began the process of draining the lake in order to dredge it. The expected reopen date was unknown, but may be as late as 2019 or 2020.

On September 26, 2017 the Alamogordo city commissioners approved an $8.6 million contract to drain, dredge, and restore the lake. The city engineer estimated that it would take about 24 months for the work to be completed and the lake reopened.
