= Little Bear Fire =

Wildfire in New Mexico, United States

- Date: June 4 - July 30, 2012
- Location: New Mexico

Statistics
- Total area: 44,330 acres (179.4 km^{2})

Impacts
- Structures lost: 254

Ignition
- Cause: Lightning

The Little Bear Fire wildfire in New Mexico on June 4, 2012 burned 44,330 acres and 254 buildings. The previously most destructive fire was the Cerro Grande Fire. The fire began on June 4, 2012 from a lightning strike and quickly grew out of control due to dry, windy conditions. The Little Bear Fire was contained by July 30, 2012 according to Federal Emergency Management Agency.

There was no loss of human life at all, but one couple in the evacuation zone reported that they received at least one call to evacuate the area. The New Mexico government did an effective job of notifying the public about the fire and mitigating damages.

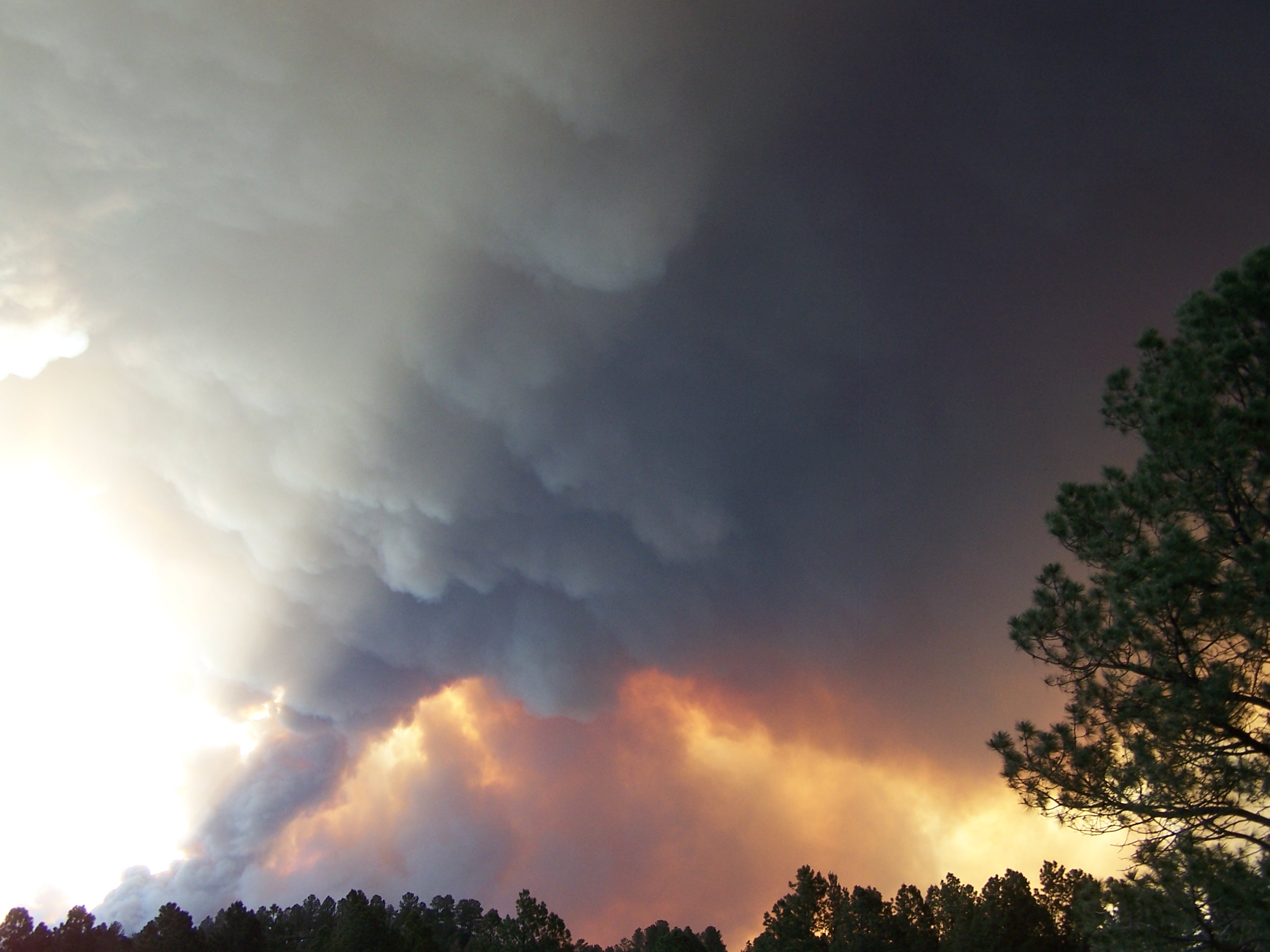
view from Mecham Road

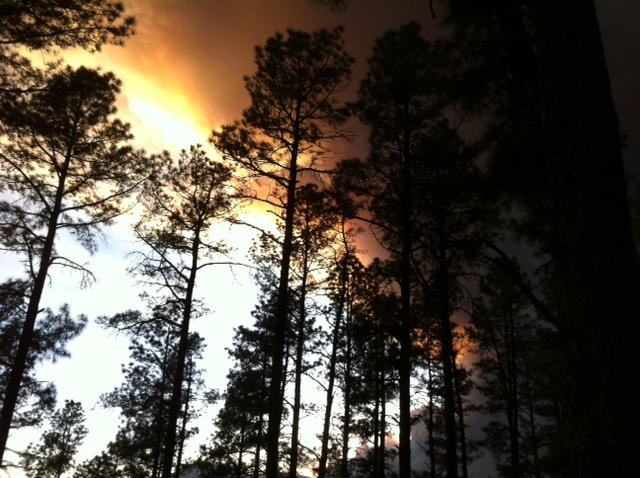
8 June 2012
