= Alamogordo Woman's Club =

- U.S. National Register of Historic Places
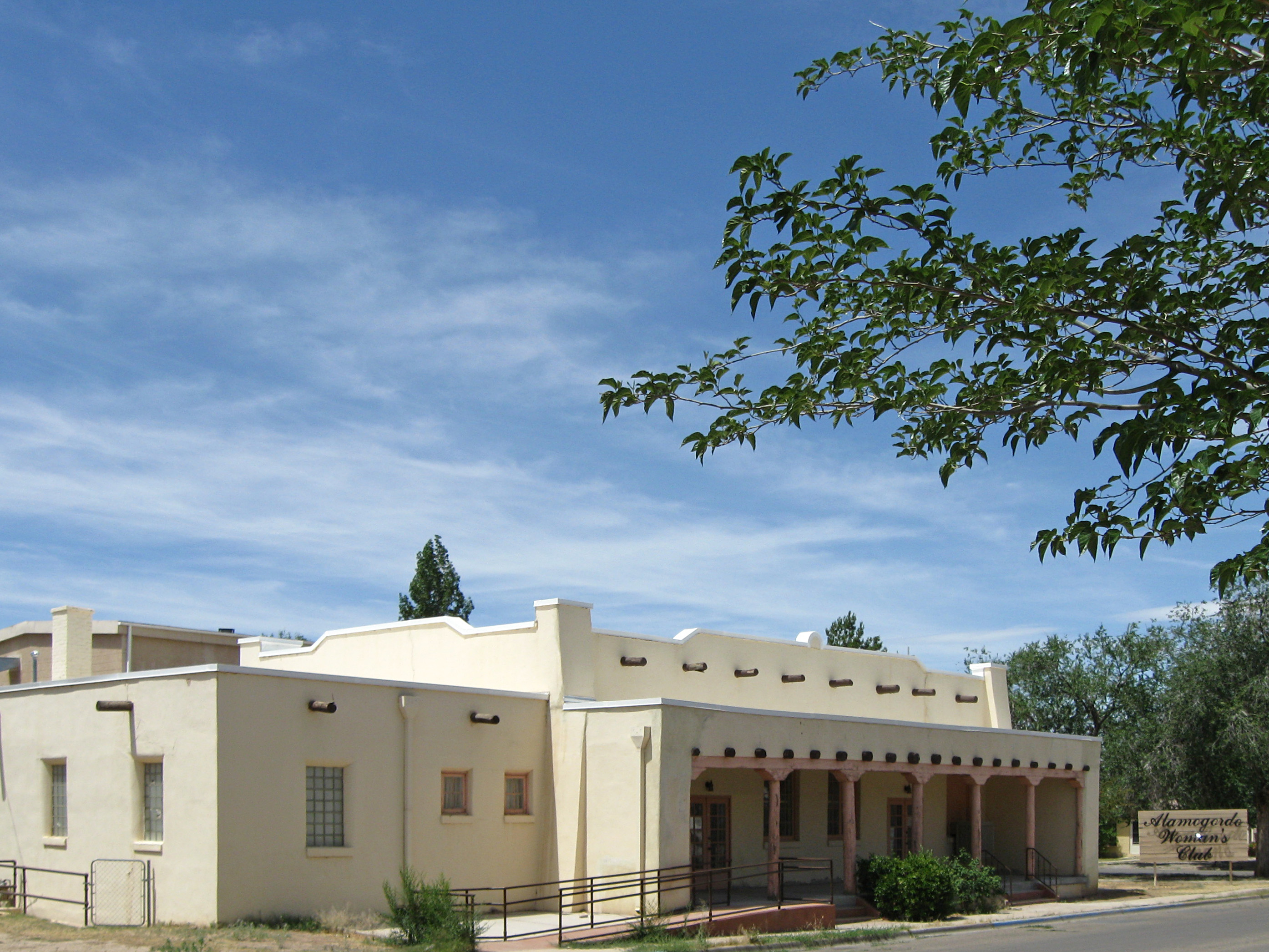

- Location within New Mexico Location within the United States
- Location: SE corner of 12th St. and Indiana Ave., Alamogordo, New Mexico
- Coordinates: 32.90166°N 105.95620°W
- Area: less than one acre
- Built: 1936-37
- Built by: Works Progress Administration
- Architectural style: Pueblo Revival
- MPS: New Mexico Federation of Women's Club Buildings in New Mexico MPS
- NRHP reference No.: 03000734
- Added to NRHP: August 4, 2003

The Alamogordo Woman's Club is a women's club based in New Mexico. It operates under the auspices of the New Mexico Federation of Women's Clubs (NMFWC) (now known as GFWC New Mexico). The club was created to provide Alamogordo women a way to serve their community. Of note was the Alamogordo Woman's Club's providing books to school libraries.

== The building ==
The Alamogordo Woman's Club was built in 1937 in the Pueblo Revival style by the Works Progress Administration (WPA)

It is a one-story 80 by 52 feet (24 m × 16 m) building built by Works Progress Administration workers. It was "most likely designed by the project foreman, as were other WPA-funded women's clubs in New Mexico."

Its main hall includes three Federal Arts Project paintings by J.R. Willis, a New Mexico artist. Joseph Roy Willis (1876-1960) was based in Albuquerque.

It was one of several structures in the Tularosa Basin to be built by the WPA. Others WPA buildings are the Alamogordo Post Office (now Otero County Administration Building), and parts of the New Mexico School for the Blind campus.

The Alamogordo Woman's Club building was listed on the National Register of Historic Places in 2003.
