= Nogal, New Mexico =

- Census-designated place
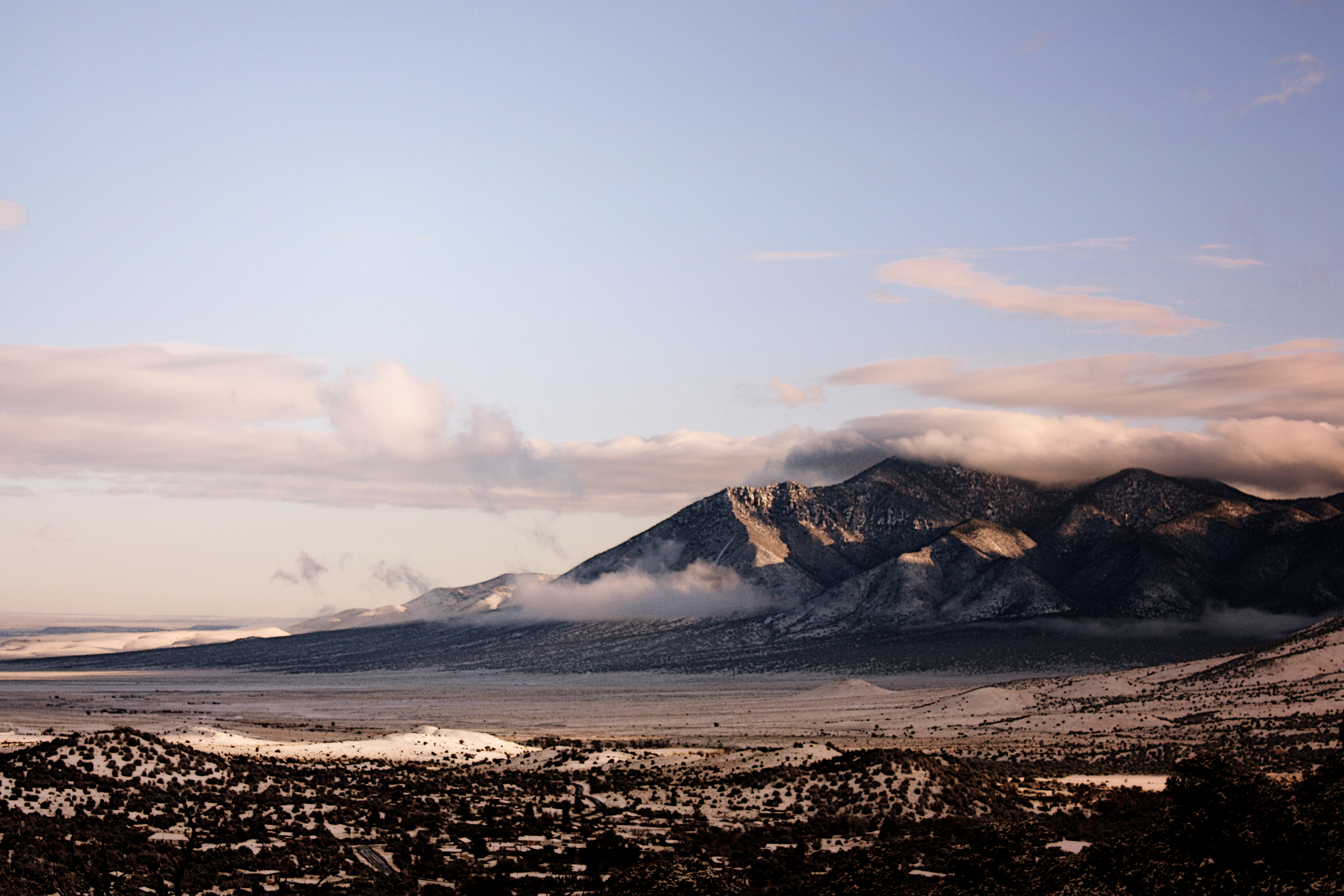
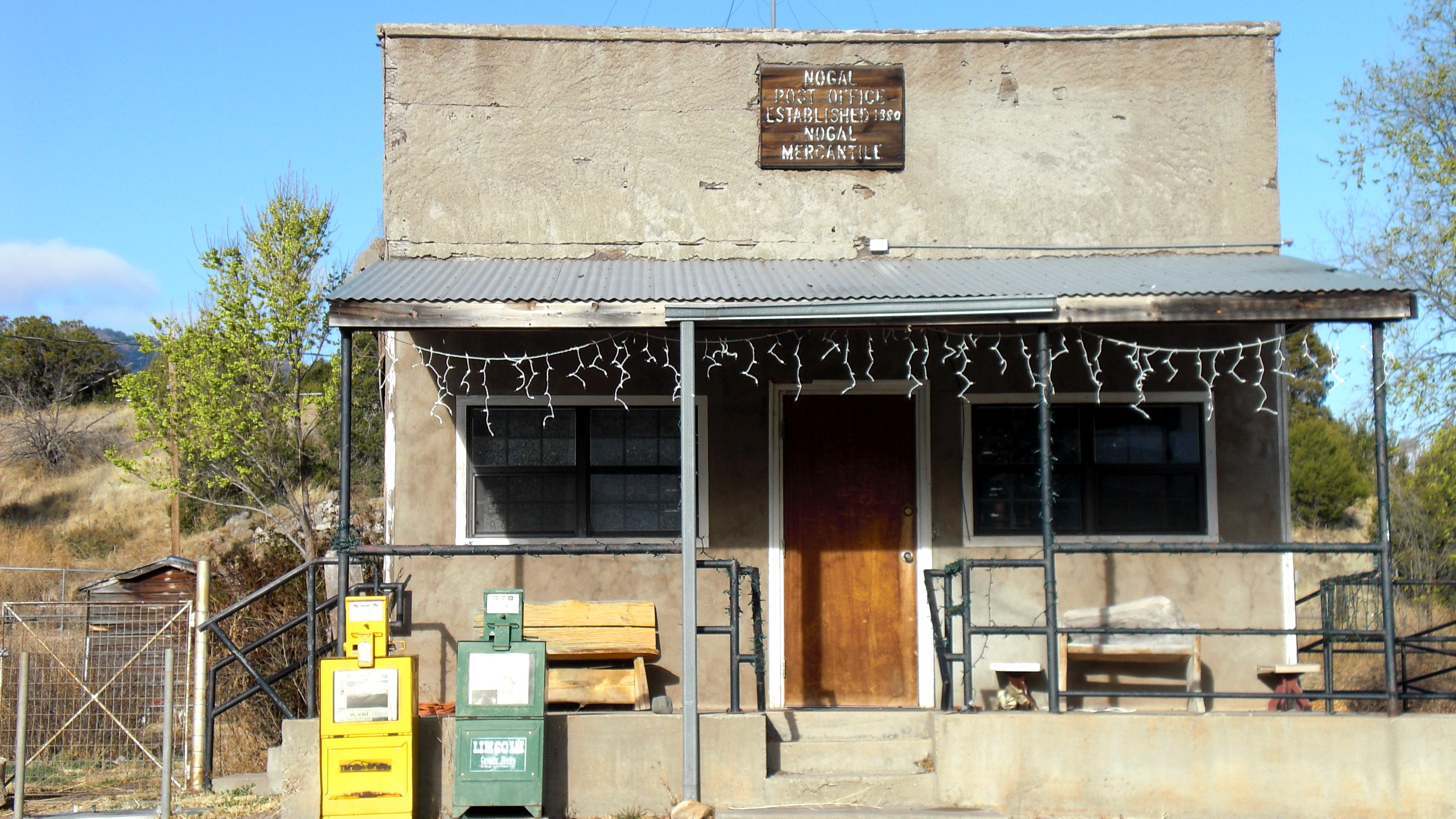
- Skyline Nogal Mercantile

- Location within New Mexico Location within the United States
- Coordinates: 33°32′18″N 105°42′43″W
- Country: United States
- State: New Mexico
- County: Lincoln

Area
  - Total: 7.61 sq mi (19.71 km^{2})
  - Land: 7.61 sq mi (19.71 km^{2})
  - Water: 0 sq mi (0.00 km^{2})
- Elevation: 6,798 ft (2,072 m)

Population (2020)
  - Total: 105
  - Density: 13.8/sq mi (5.33/km^{2})
- Time zone: UTC-7 (Mountain (MST))
  - Summer (DST): UTC-6 (MDT)
- ZIP code: 88341
- Area code: 575
- GNIS feature ID: 2584164
- FIPS code: 35-52190

Nogal is a census-designated place and unincorporated community in Lincoln County, New Mexico, United States. As of the 2020 census, Nogal had a population of 105. Nogal has a post office with ZIP code 88341, which opened on November 9, 1880.

== Geography ==
Nogal is in southwestern Lincoln County, in the valley of Nogal Creek at the north end of the Sierra Blanca range. New Mexico State Road 37 passes through the community, leading northwest 12 miles (19 km) to Carrizozo, the county seat, and south 18 miles (29 km) to Ruidoso, the largest community in the county.

== Demographics ==
Historical population
Census	Pop.	Note	%±
2020	105		—
U.S. Decennial Census

== Education ==
Carrizozo Municipal Schools is the local school district.
