= Carrizozo, New Mexico =

- Town
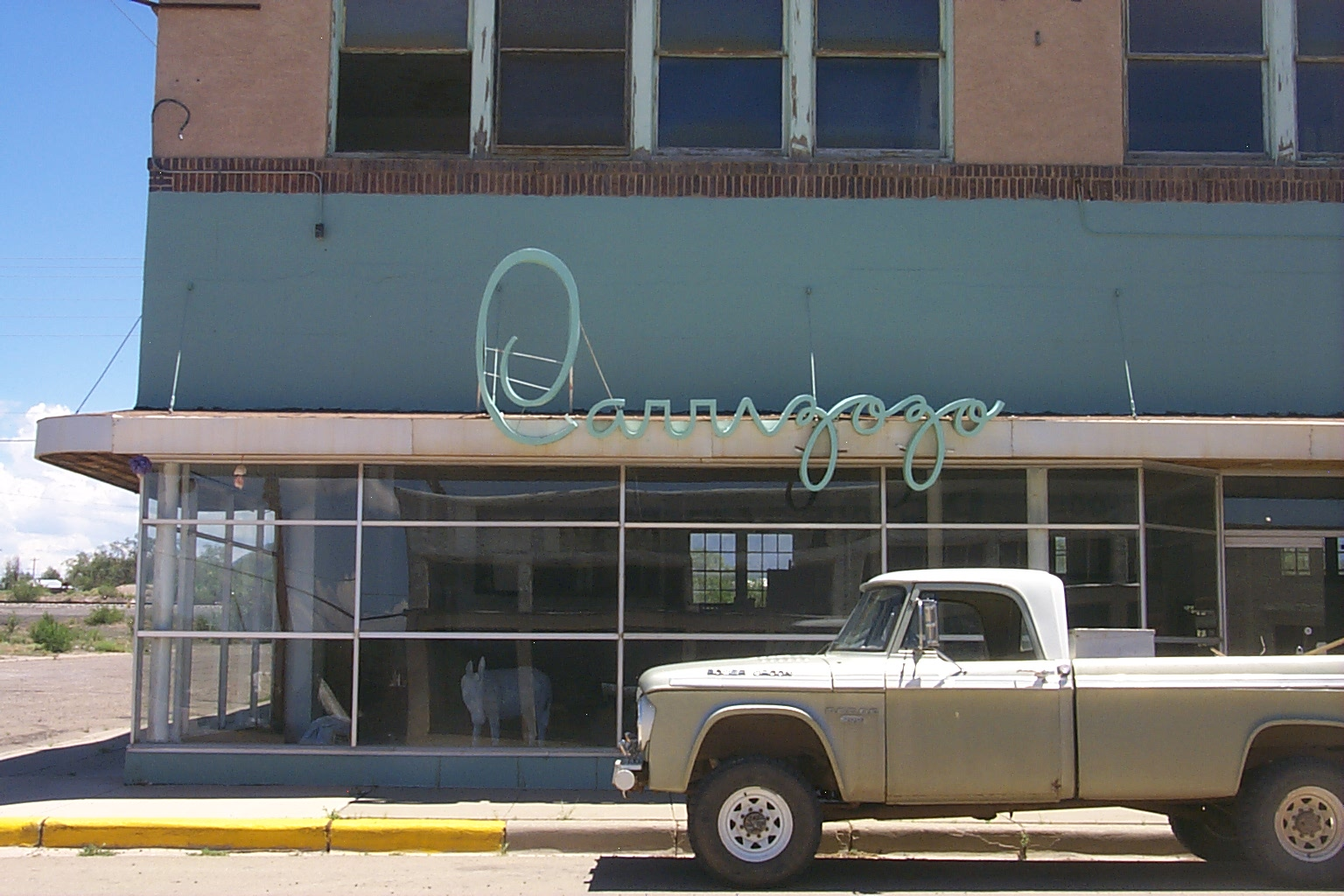
- Downtown Carrizozo
- Nickname: 'Zozo
- Location of Carrizozo, New Mexico

- Location in the United States
- Coordinates: 33°38′35″N 105°52′25″W
- Country: United States
- State: New Mexico
- County: Lincoln

Area
  - Total: 8.36 sq mi (21.66 km^{2})
  - Land: 8.36 sq mi (21.66 km^{2})
  - Water: 0 sq mi (0.00 km^{2})
- Elevation: 5,545 ft (1,690 m)

Population (2020)
  - Total: 972
  - Density: 116.2/sq mi (44.88/km^{2})
- Time zone: UTC−7 (Mountain (MST))
  - Summer (DST): UTC−6 (MDT)
- ZIP Code: 88301
- Area code: 575
- FIPS code: 35-12500
- GNIS feature ID: 2413174
- Website: www.carrizozonm.us

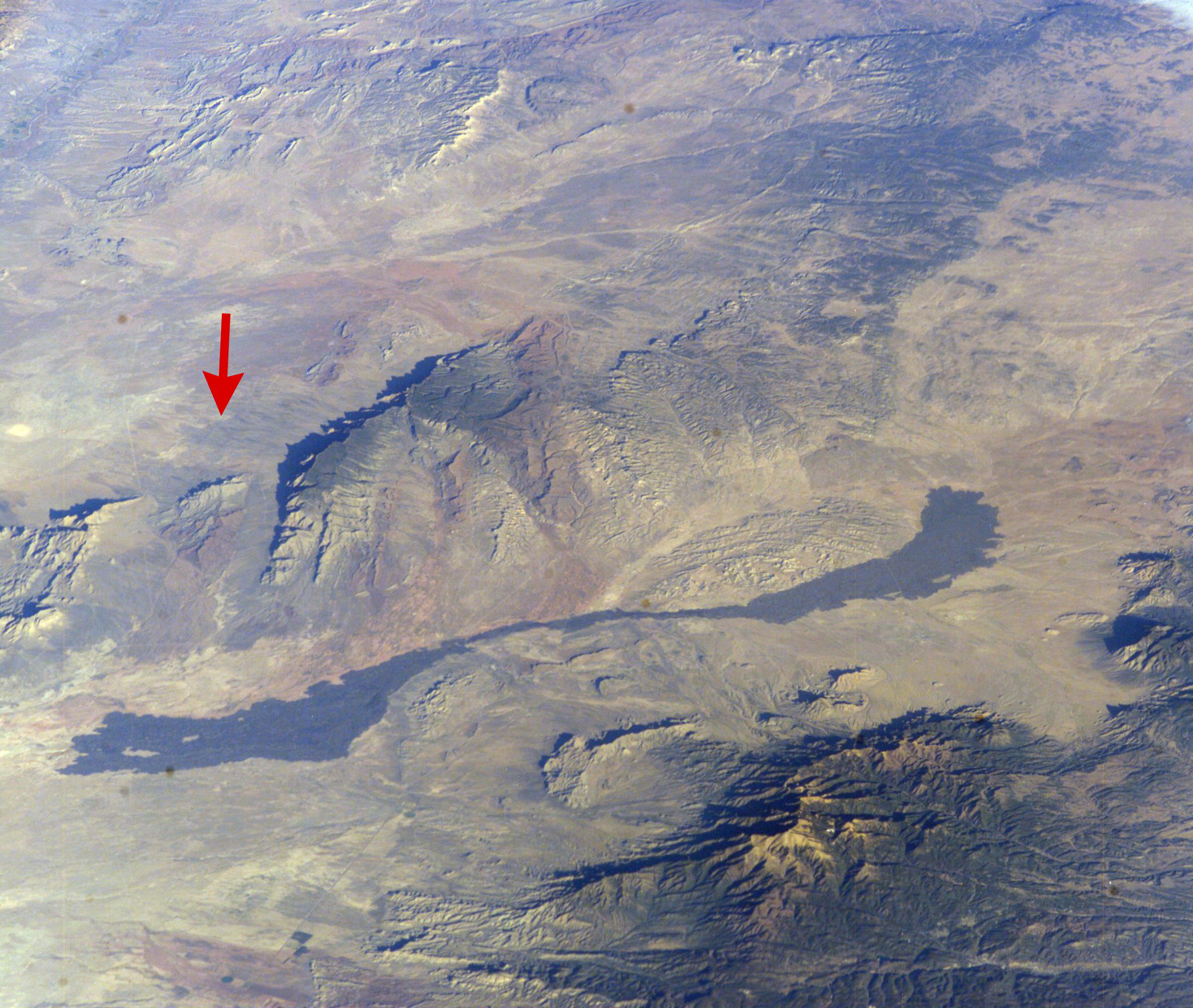
The Carrizozo Malpais is the long dark streak across the bottom half of the image. The red arrowhead marks the location of Trinity site. Credit: NASA Astronaut photograph ISS008-E-5604, taken at an altitude of 198 miles.

Carrizozo is a town in Lincoln County, New Mexico, United States. It is the county seat, and as of the 2020 census had a population of 972. Founded in 1899, the town provided the main railroad access for Lincoln County, and the town experienced significant population growth in the early decades of the 1900s. However, with declining relevance of the railroad, the population of the town has gradually declined. The town is located at the intersection of U.S. Routes 54 and 380.

== Name ==
The name of the town is derived from the Spanish vernacular for reed grass (Carrizo), which grew significantly in the area and provided excellent feed for ranch cattle. The additional "zo" at the end of the town name was added to indicate abundance of Carrizo grass. The town is now often referred to colloquially as "Zozo".

== History ==
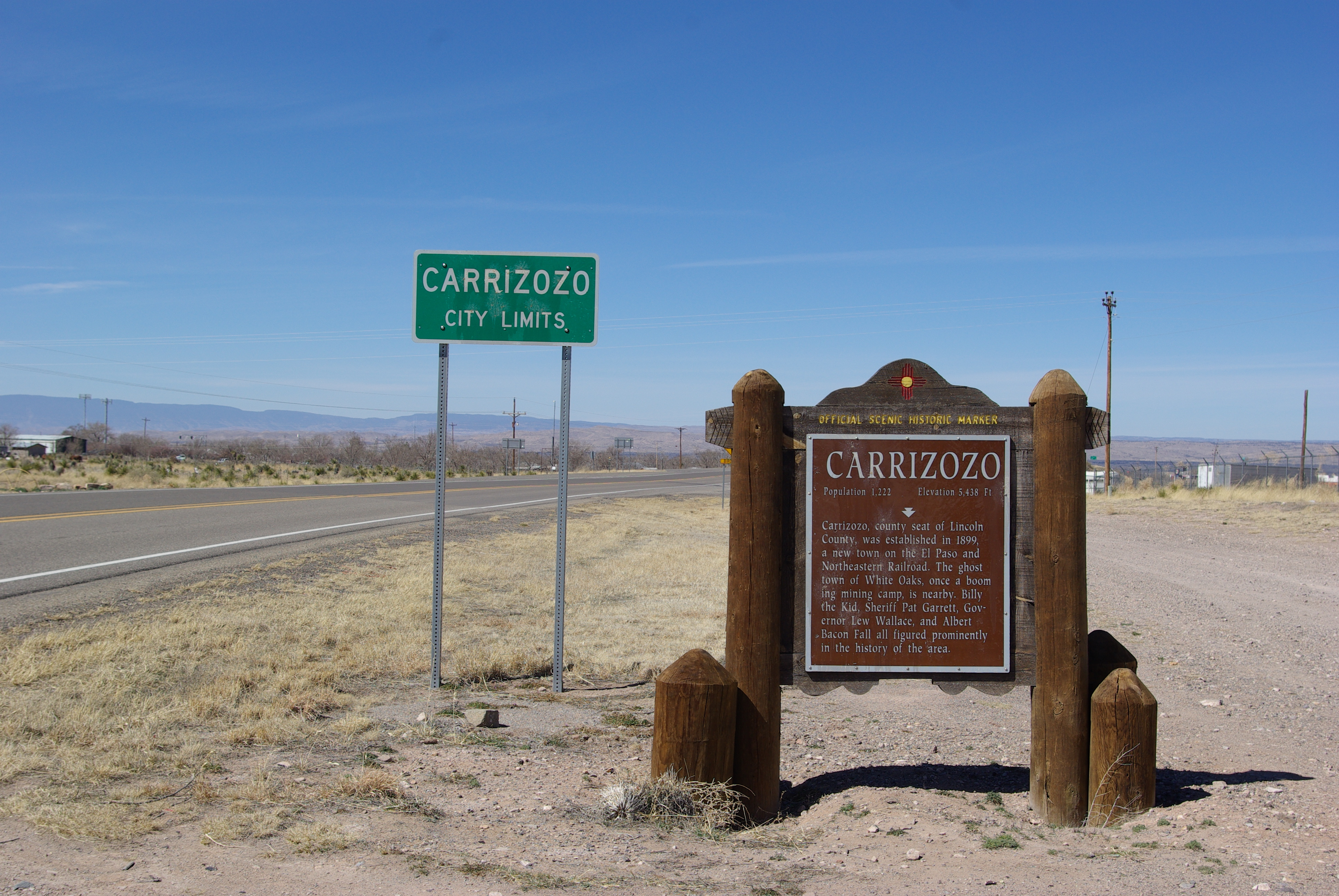
Official scenic historical marker at eastern town limit

Prior to 1899, the area was primarily a few ranches and a stagecoach crossing with limited permanent settlement. Lawrence Murphy, a merchant active in the Lincoln County War (1878), owned a major ranch in the area. The location of Carrizozo was selected as the site for a station on the El Paso and Northeastern Railway (EP&NE) main line in 1899. Carrizozo was chosen over the nearby booming mine town of White Oaks, resulting in large-scale migration from White Oaks to Carrizozo.

The railroad brought businesses, growing population, and increased importance to the town of Carrizozo. As a result, a county referendum in 1909 moved the seat of Lincoln County from the town of Lincoln to Carrizozo. This decision resulted in a four-year legal battle that was eventually resolved in favor of Carrizozo by the Supreme Court of the United States in the case of Gray v. Taylor. The result was a boom in which railroad access and political importance combined to lead to significant population growth in Carrizozo. The population reached around 2,000 by 1920.

During this time, Albert B. Fall, a U.S. Senator from New Mexico and later Secretary of the Interior, owned the Three Rivers Ranch just south of Carrizozo, but had to sell it to settle legal debts as a result of his involvement in the Teapot Dome scandal (1922–1923). During the same time, journalist Quentin Reynolds visited the town and wrote a piece on it for Collier's. Later, he wrote in The Wounded Don't Cry that "I used to agree with Bugs that once you left New York, you were strictly on the horse and buggy circuit. But of late years I've had to modify that. Since then I've discovered New Orleans, San Francisco and a little place called Carrizozo, New Mexico, where I want to go when I die. I want to go there and gang around the drug store and sneak behind the prescription counter with Art Rolland and have a nip of what he calls Old Granddaddy then type out his prescriptions for him."

Carrizozo is about 35 miles (56 km) east of the Trinity Site, where the first nuclear bomb was detonated on July 16, 1945. Residents reported tremors like an earthquake and, as the first major downwind settlement, the town received a significant part of the remnants of the mushroom cloud resulting in nuclear fallout of the area, which caused radioactive contamination. Bonito Lake which also lies within the estimated radioactive fallout zone of the 1945 Trinity test, was a water source for Carrizozo.

With the rise of the automobile, Carrizozo's proximity to the railroad became less important starting in the 1950s, and the last passenger train passed through in 1968. The result was a decrease in economic opportunity in Carrizozo, and the population fell back to about 1,200 people for much of the end of the 20th century. Recently, the town has seen increasing focus on tourism, and cherry cider produced in the town was known nationally. The Carrizozo Orchard has since been permanently closed.

== Geography ==
Carrizozo is located at the northern end of the Tularosa Basin, which extends southward to the New Mexico–Texas border. The town itself is located in a flat area known prior to the founding of the town as the Corrizo flats, with typical Chihuahuan desert scrub and desert grasslands.

To the west of the town is the Carrizozo Malpais, a 40-mile-long (64 km) lava flow that is about 1,500 years old and accessible through the Valley of Fires Recreation Area. To the northeast is Carrizo Mountain, a 9,600-foot (2,900 m) peak within the Sacramento Mountains, and to the southeast is the Sierra Blanca mountain range which rises to an elevation of 11,981 ft (3,652 m).

=== Climate ===
Carrizozo has an average annual temperature of 55.7 °F (13.2 °C) and an average precipitation of 12.8 in (330 mm). The heaviest precipitation is in the summer. The climate under the Köppen classification is Bsk (cold, semi-arid steppe).

Carrizozo, New Mexico

Climate chart (precipitation, max. and min. temperature)
J	F	M	A	M	J	J	A	S	O	N	D
0.6 55 25	0.7 56 26	0.7 63 30	0.5 72 37	0.7 85 47	1.1 96 59	2.1 95 55	2.4 87 54	1.5 82 51	1.4 72 40	0.6 60 28	0.9 55 25
- █ Average max. and min. temperatures in °F
- █ Precipitation totals in inches
Metric conversion
J	F	M	A	M	J	J	A	S	O	N	D
16 13 −4	17 13 −3	18 17 −1	14 22 3	17 29 8	28 36 15	53 35 13	60 31 12	39 28 11	37 22 4	15 16 −2	23 13 −4
- █ Average max. and min. temperatures in °C
- █ Precipitation totals in mm

== Demographics ==
Historical population
Census	Pop.	Note	%±
1920	1,301		—
1930	1,171		−10.0%
1940	1,457		24.4%
1950	1,389		−4.7%
1960	1,546		11.3%
1970	1,123		−27.4%
1980	1,222		8.8%
1990	1,075		−12.0%
2000	1,036		−3.6%
2010	996		−3.9%
2020	972		−2.4%
U.S. Decennial Census

As of the 2010 census, there were 996 people living in the town. The racial makeup of the town was 78.71% White, 0.70% African American, 2.61% American Indian, 14.16% Other, and 3.82% identified as two or more. Hispanics of any race were 43.57% of the population. Of the population, 54.72% were men and 45.28% were women. Of these, 15.96% were under the age of 18, 24.50% were over 65, and 59.54% were between 18 and 65.

== Transportation ==
Carrizozo is located at the intersection of U.S. Routes 54 and 380.

Railroad freight traffic is provided by Union Pacific.

For general aviation, the town is served by Carrizozo Municipal Airport.

== Education ==
Carrizozo Municipal Schools is the local school district.

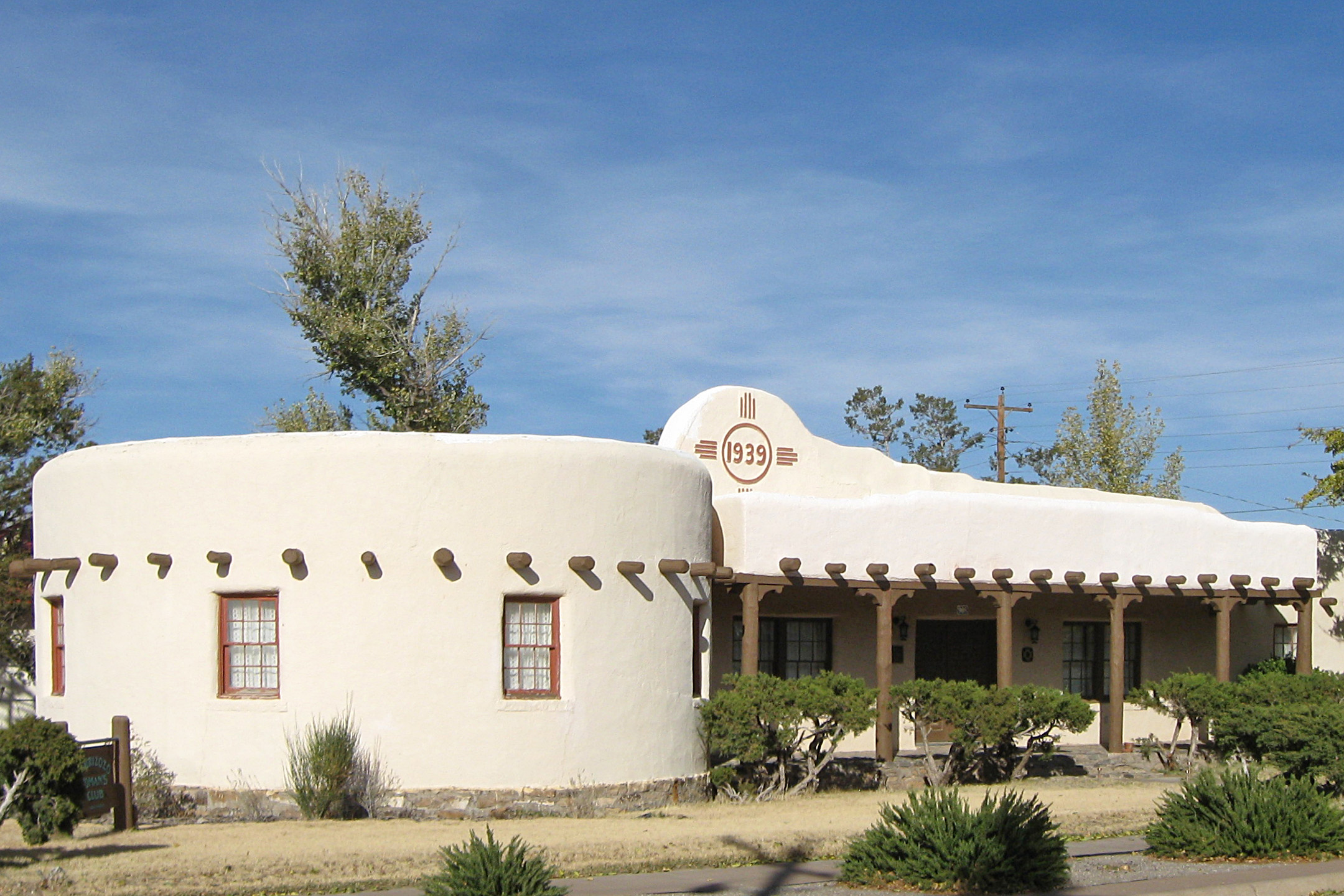
The Carrizozo Women's Club

== Points of interest ==
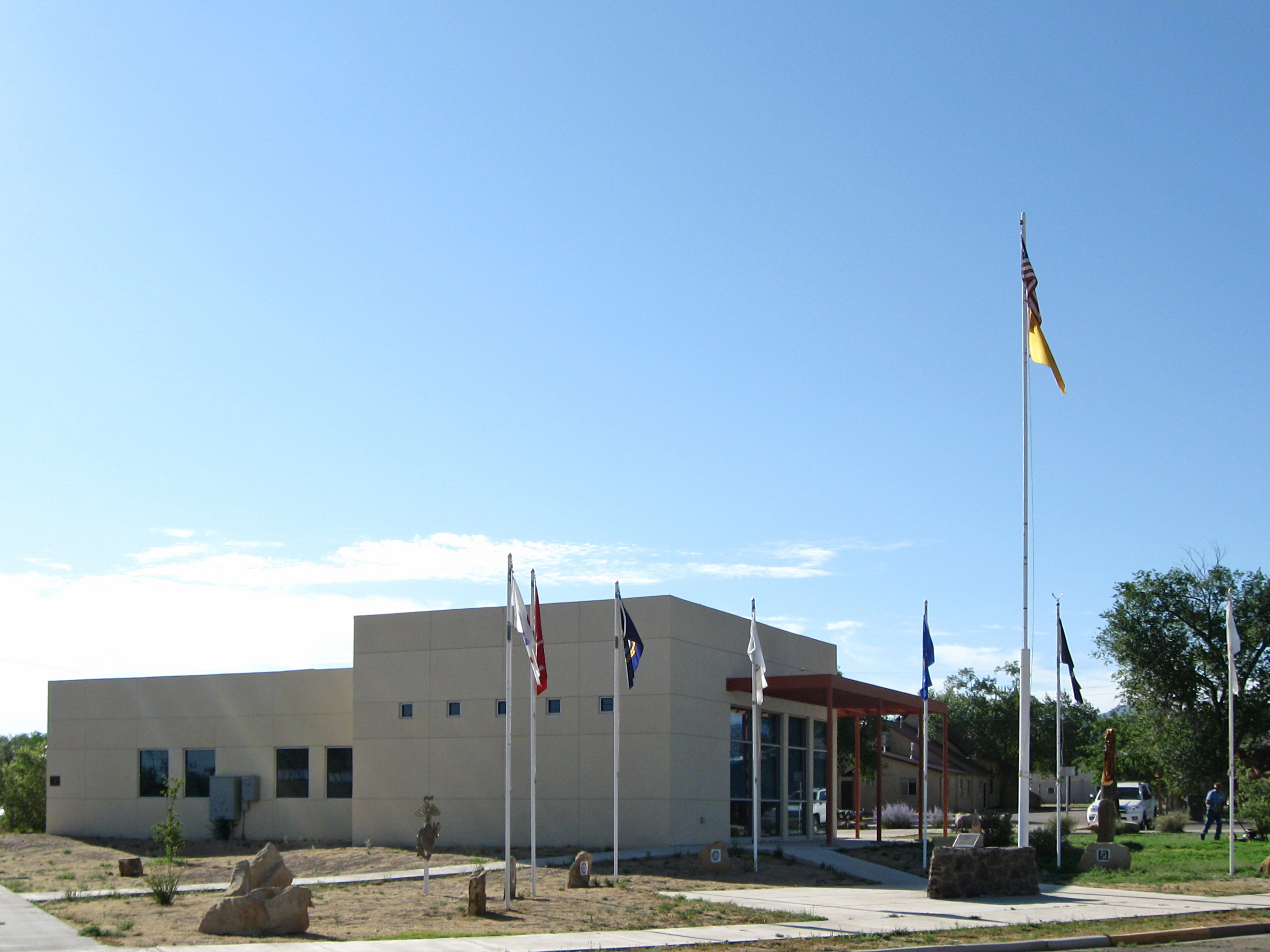
Carrizozo Municipal Building

- Carrizozo Women's Club (1920 Pueblo Revival style building listed in the National Register of Historic Places)
- Carrizozo Heritage Museum (1940s built as a frozen food locker—converted into local history museum in 2003)
- Lincoln National Forest (southeast of the city via U.S. Route 380 and NM 37)
- Valley of Fires Recreation Area (west-northwest of the city via U.S. Route 380)

== Film and television ==
A number of movies have been filmed in Carrizozo. Movies which have been filmed at least partially in Carrizozo include:

- Wander (2020)
- Gambit (2012)
- This Must be the Place (2011)
- The Book of Eli (2010)
- Deja Vu, Hera's Odyssey (2004)
- The Outfitters (1999)
- Mad Love (1995)

== Notable people ==
- Albert B. Fall, first senator from the state of New Mexico (1912–1921)
- Rick Geary, American cartoonist and illustrator, has lived in Carrizozo since 2007.
- Charlie Siringo, famous Pinkerton detective assigned to Carrizozo to catch cattle thieves (1916–1917)
- Earl Reece Stadtman, biochemist born in Carrizozo in 1919
