= 2021 in New Mexico =

- Decades: 2000s; 2010s; 2020s
- See also: History of New Mexico; Historical outline of New Mexico; List of years in New Mexico; 2021 in the United States

The following is a list of events of the year 2021 in New Mexico.

== Incumbents ==
=== State government ===
- Governor: Michelle Lujan Grisham (D)

== Events ==
- April 12 – A bill to legalize recreational use, House Bill 2, the Cannabis Regulation Act, was signed by Governor Michelle Lujan Grisham.
- April 26 – The Three Rivers Fire started which burned 5,854 acres in the Lincoln National Forest.
- May 20 – The Johnson Fire started which burned burned 88,918 acres near Gila National Forest.
- August 13 – A 13-year-old student allegedly shot and killed another 13-year-old student, Bennie Hargrove, during a lunch hour at Washington Middle School.
- June 1 – Melanie Stansbury wins in the 2021 New Mexico's 1st congressional district special election.
- July 11 – Virgin Galactic Unity 22 was launched by Virgin Galactic at Spaceport America in Sierra County.
- October 21 – Rust shooting incident: Halyna Hutchins was fatally shot and Joel Souza was injured on the set of the film Rust.
- November 2 – Tim Keller wins in the 2021 Albuquerque mayoral election.
- December 18 – 2021 New Mexico Bowl played against UTEP Miners and Fresno State Bulldogs.

== See also ==
- 2021 in the United States
