= 2019 in New Mexico =

- Decades: 1990s; 2000s; 2010s; 2020s
- See also: History of New Mexico; Historical outline of New Mexico; List of years in New Mexico; 2019 in the United States

The following is a list of events of the year 2019 in New Mexico.

== Incumbents ==
=== State government ===
- Governor: Michelle Lujan Grisham (D)

== Events ==
- January 1 – Lujan Grisham was sworn in as Governor after beating Steve Pearce in the 2018 New Mexico gubernatorial election.
- March 9 – New Mexico United played its inaugural match at Isotopes Park.
- June 28 – The New Mexico Supreme Court overturned the death sentences of Robert Ray Fry and Timothy Allen effectively closing down New Mexico's death row.
- July 1 – Senate Bill 323 was signed into law by Governor Lujan Grisham which made first-time possession of up to 1/2 ounce (14 g) of cannabis a petty misdemeanor offense, punishable by a $50 fine and decriminalized possession of drug paraphernalia.
- August 30 - The 95th Burning of Zozobra saw a record crowd of over 64,000 people.
- October 5 – 48th annual Albuquerque International Balloon Fiesta.
- December 20 – The White Sands National Park was redesignated as a national park by Congress and signed into law by President Donald Trump.
- December 21 – 2019 New Mexico Bowl was played against Central Michigan Chippewas and San Diego State Aztecs.

== See also ==
- 2019 in the United States
