= 2024 in New Mexico =

- Decades: 2000s; 2010s; 2020s
- See also: History of New Mexico; Historical outline of New Mexico; List of years in New Mexico; 2024 in the United States

The following is a list of events of the year 2024 in New Mexico.

== Incumbents ==
=== State government ===
- Governor: Michelle Lujan Grisham (D)

== Events ==
- June 4 –
  - 2024 New Mexico Democratic presidential primary
  - 2024 New Mexico Republican presidential primary
- June 18 – 2024 New Mexico wildfires:
  - At least one person dies, over 500 structures are damaged or destroyed, and several thousand people are forced to evacuate from Ruidoso, after the South Fork Fire burns over 15,276 acres of land.
- September 7 – The Boeing Crew Flight Test capsule returns to Earth uncrewed, landing at the White Sands Space Harbor, after being docked for three months at the International Space Station.
- October 20 – At least two people are killed and 309 others are rescued in flash flooding in Roswell.
- November 5 – 2024 United States presidential election in New Mexico

== See also ==
- 2024 in the United States
