= 2020 in New Mexico =

- Decades: 2000s; 2010s; 2020s
- See also: History of New Mexico; Historical outline of New Mexico; List of years in New Mexico; 2020 in the United States

The following is a list of events of the year 2020 in New Mexico.

== Incumbents ==
=== State government ===
- Governor: Michelle Lujan Grisham (D)

== Events ==
- Ongoing – COVID-19 pandemic in New Mexico
- March 11 – Governor Lujan Grisham signed Executive Order 2020–004, declaring a statewide public health emergency.
- March 25 – The first death in the state is reported. A male in his late 70s died on March 22 at Artesia General Hospital.
- June 15 – The Vics Peak Fire started which burned burned 14,624 acres in the Apache Kid Wilderness in the Cibola National Forest.
- September 4 – Virtual burning of Zozobra took place in Santa Fe.
- November 3:
  - In the 2020 United States presidential election in New Mexico, Joe Biden wins the state by a 10.79% margin of victory.
  - In the 2020 United States Senate election in New Mexico, Ben Ray Luján defeated Mark Ronchetti by a 6.1% margin.
  - Yvette Herrell defeated incumbent Xochitl Torres Small for New Mexico's 2nd congressional district.

== See also ==
- 2020 in the United States
