= 2018 in New Mexico =

- Decades: 1990s; 2000s; 2010s; 2020s
- See also: History of New Mexico; Historical outline of New Mexico; List of years in New Mexico; 2018 in the United States

The following is a list of events of the year 2018 in New Mexico.

== Incumbents ==
=== State government ===
- Governor: Susana Martinez (R)

== Events ==
- May 31 – The Ute Park Fire started which burned burned 36,740 acres east of Ute Park.
- June 6 – New Mexico United was founded.
- August 31 – The 94th Burning of Zozobra.
- October 8 – Netflix buys Albuquerque Studios.
- November 3:
  - In the 2018 New Mexico gubernatorial election, Michelle Lujan Grisham defeated Steve Pearce by a margin of 14.4%.
  - In the 2018 New Mexico House of Representatives election, all 70 of the state's House districts were up for reelection.
  - In the 2018 United States Senate election in New Mexico, Martin Heinrich defeated Mick Rich and Gary Johnson.
- December 13 – VSS Unity VP-03, the first suborbital spaceflight of VSS Unity was successfully completed.

== See also ==
- 2018 in the United States
