= 2021 New Mexico wildfires =

Fire season

Statistics
- Total fires: 363 (As of June 9)
- Total area: 121,277 acres (49,079 ha)

Impacts
- Deaths: 1
- Cost: Unknown

The 2021 New Mexico wildfire season began on February 7, 2021. As of July 7, there have been at least 363 fires across the state that have burned at least 121,277 acres (49,079 ha).

== Background ==
While "fire season" can vary every year in New Mexico based on weather conditions, most wildfires occur in from early May through June, before the monsoon season. However, there is an increasing fire risk year-round from climate change. Droughts are becoming more common partly from rising temperatures in the state that evaporate water from streams. Unpredictable monsoon levels can increase fire risks. New Mexico is prone to strong winds, and jet stream disruption from climate change can make them stronger. Intense winds contribute to drought, allow wildfires to spread, and dry out vegetation. Unique plant life and fine fuels in the state fuel wildfires, especially in the Eastern New Mexico grasslands. Rising temperatures will reduce snowpack and shorten the snowmelt season which can increase drought and wildfire severity.

Overgrazing and logging in the late 1800s and over 100 years of strict fire suppression affected natural systems of New Mexico led to a growing wildfire risk and intensity. Scientists predict New Mexico's forests will gradually deteriorate, turning into shrublands as wildfires burn the forests.

== Early outlook ==
In line with general predictions of a ‘very active wildfire season’ for the Western United States, state and local officials in New Mexico expect a particularly severe wildfire season for the state, citing effects of the ongoing drought conditions that make vegetation more susceptible to fires. Southwest Coordination Center Predictive Services forecasted an 'above normal' risk for significant wildland fires for May and June for the entire state, with fire potential returning to 'normal' by July with the timely arrival of a normal to above-normal monsoon.

== List of wildfires ==
The following is a list of fires that burned more than 1,000 acres (400 ha), or produced significant structural damage or casualties.

| Name | County | Acres | Start date | Containment date | Notes | Ref |
|---|---|---|---|---|---|---|
| Culebra | Torrance | 1,462 | February 27 | February 28 | | |
| Three Rivers | Lincoln | 5,854 | April 26 | June 21 | Unknown cause | |
| Cuervito | San Miguel | 1,621 | May 9 | June 18 | Lightning-caused; managed for ecological benefit. | |
| Doagy | Catron | 12,785 | May 14 | June 3 | Lightning-caused; managed for ecological benefit. | |
| Johnson | Grant, Catron | 88,918 | May 20 | July 23 | Lightning-caused; managed for ecological benefit. | |
| Eicks | Hidalgo | 900 | May 24 | June 3 | Unknown cause; 1 firefighter fatality | |
| Poso | Rio Arriba | 2,057 | May 29 | June 29 | Lightning-caused; managed for ecological benefit. | |
| Amargo | Rio Arriba | 1,296 | August 7 | August 23 | | |

== See also ==
- 2021 Arizona wildfires
- 2021 Colorado wildfires
