= Gun laws in New Mexico =

Location of New Mexico in the United States

Gun laws in New Mexico regulate the sale, possession, and use of firearms and ammunition in the state of New Mexico in the United States.

New Mexico is among states with some of the least restrictive firearms laws in the country. Being part of the Intermountain West, New Mexico is home to a strong gun culture, which is reflected in New Mexico's constitution and gun laws. State laws governing the possession and use of firearms include those in New Mexico Statutes Chapter 30, Article 7, "Weapons and Explosives".

== Summary table ==
Subject / law	Long guns	Handguns	Relevant Statutes	Notes
State permit required to purchase?	No	No		New Mexico does not require any permit to purchase a long gun or handgun.
Firearm registration?	No	No		
Assault weapon law?	No	No		
Magazine Capacity Restriction?	No	No		There is no magazine capacity restriction.
Owner license required?	No	No		
Waiting Period for Firearms Transfers?	7-Days*	7-Days*	NMSA 30-7-7.3	*New Mexico law imposes a 7-day waiting period for most firearms transfers, which has been ruled unconstitutional by the 10th Circuit US Court of Appeals. While the circuit court's would render the waiting period unenforceable, authorities in New Mexico have chosen to ignore the 10th Circuit's ruling and continue to enforce the 7-day waiting period on firearms transfers.
License required for concealed carry?	N/A	Yes	NMSA 29–19–4	Shall-issue to full-time and part-time residents (who hold a valid New Mexico ID/Driver's License), with passage of a criminal history check and mental health records check, and completion of 15-hour handgun safety course that includes live-fire instruction. Active military and law enforcement members and veterans honorably discharged within 20 years of permit application are exempt from training requirement. Permit required to carry concealed loaded firearm on foot. No permit needed for open carry, concealed carry of an unloaded firearm, or transport of a loaded firearm either concealed or openly in a vehicle. Unlawfully carrying a concealed firearm is a petty misdemeanor that is punishable by up to 6 months in a county jail and/or a fine of up to $500. Except for active-duty military members and dependents permanently stationed in the state, New Mexico does not issue CHLs to non-residents.
License required for open carry?	No	No		It is legal to open carry a loaded rifle and/or handgun in New Mexico without a permit.
Vehicle carry permitted?	Yes	Yes		A loaded firearm may be carried/transported either openly or concealed in a vehicle without a permit.
Out-of-state permits recognized?	N/A	Partial	NMSA 29-19-12	New Mexico recognizes permits from states with reciprocity agreements (currently 24 states). New Mexico law limits reciprocity agreements to states with licensing standards that are substantially similar or more restrictive than New Mexico's.
Duty to Inform?	No	No	NMSA 29-19-9	Although not mandated by state law, it is customary in New Mexico to inform law enforcement officials when transporting firearms. Those who are carrying a loaded pistol or revolver concealed while on foot must carry their CHL with them and present it upon demand by law enforcement.
Concealed Carry on College Campuses?	No	No	NMSA 29-19-8; NMSA 30-7-2.4	Firearms and ammunition may be stored in a locked vehicle while parked on campus, and may be carried while driving in a vehicle on campus, but may not be carried on foot while on campus property or stored in an on-campus facility. Exceptions exist for university-sponsored shooting events and ROTC programs.
NFA weapons restricted?	No	No		
State pre-emption of local ordinances?	Yes	Yes	NMSA 29-19-10	As stated in Article 2, Section 6 of the New Mexico Constitution. Tribal laws on Native American reservations not pre-empted. Some tribes recognize New Mexico firearms laws, while others do not and have far more restrictive firearms policies. Additionally, some local jurisdictions have enacted ordinances restricting or banning the discharge of firearms within their boundaries, with exceptions for shooting ranges and designated hunting areas during hunting season.
Castle Doctrine law?	Yes	Yes	NMSA 30-2-7	New Mexico's self-defense statute (NMSA 30-2-7) is vaguely worded and does not specifically address Castle Doctrine or Stand Your Ground situations. However, Castle Doctrine has been established on a limited basis by a 1946 New Mexico Supreme Court ruling, which states that when a person reasonably feels "threatened with an attack need not retreat. In the exercise of his right of self defense, he may stand his ground and defend himself." Currently, the courts have limited the scope of Castle Doctrine/Stand Your Ground to self-defense situations occurring inside the defender's home, and neither law nor court precedents provide the defender immunity from lawsuits by the aggressor arising from the use of lethal force in self-defense. Additionally, judicial precedents in New Mexico have established that the use of lethal force is not justifiable in defense of one's property alone.
Duty to Retreat?	No	No	NM UJI 14-5190	A person who is threatened with an attack need not retreat. In the exercise of his right of self defense, he may stand his ground and defend himself.
Opt-Out statute?	Yes	Yes	NMSA 29–19–12; NMSA 30–14–6; NMAC 10.8.2.27	Property owners may prohibit the carrying of firearms onto property they lawfully possess by posting signage or verbally notifying persons upon entering the property. Violating these "gun-free" establishments is a full misdemeanor punishable by less than one year in the county jail and/or a fine of up to $1,000 (Criminal Trespass - NMSA 30-14-1).
Peaceable journey laws?	No	No		One may travel through or within New Mexico with a loaded weapon in a vehicle. Federal law pre-empts Native American reservation laws. FOPA is observed.
Red Flag Law?	Yes	Yes	NMSA 40-17	NMSA 40-17 allows law enforcement officials to petition a judge to order the temporary seizure of firearms from an individual where there is probable cause that the individual will cause harm to themselves or others. Under the law, the subject has the option to surrender his or her firearms within 48 hours of the order, to law enforcement or to a licensed firearms dealer for safekeeping until the order expires or is rescinded. The judge will then schedule a hearing within 10 days to determine based on the preponderance of evidence if the weapons should be returned to the owner, or to issue an Extreme Risk Firearm Protection Order (ERFPO) for up to 1 year. New Mexico's Red Flag law also allows for an individual subject to an ERFPO to sell or transfer seized/surrendered firearms to a licensed firearms dealer or other non-prohibited buyer, after the buyer has passed a NICS background check. Authorities in some rural jurisdictions have refused to enforce New Mexico's Red Flag Law.
Background checks required for private sales?	Yes	Yes	NMSA 30-7-7.1	Effective July 1, 2019. Senate Bill 8, which establishes a requirement for NICS background checks for private-party transfers was signed into law on March 8, 2019. Exceptions will exist for active/retired LEO transfers and transfers between immediate family members. Some local counties have adopted Second Amendment sanctuary resolutions in opposition to universal background check laws.

== Constitutional provisions and state preemption ==
New Mexico has state preemption of firearms laws, so local governments may not restrict the possession or use of firearms. However, local jurisdictions may restrict or ban the discharge of firearms within their boundaries. In 1986, Article 2, Section 6 of the state constitution was amended to say, "No law shall abridge the right of the citizen to keep and bear arms for security and defense, for lawful hunting and recreational use and for other lawful purposes, but nothing herein shall be held to permit the carrying of concealed weapons. No municipality or county shall regulate, in any way, an incident of the right to keep and bear arms."

State gun laws do not pre-empt tribal laws on Native American reservations, which cover a significant portion of the state. The only exception to this is when one is traveling through the reservation on a state-owned highway (includes US and Interstate highways) or county road, in which case state firearms policies and protections under the federal Firearm Owners' Protection Act (FOPA) do apply. While some tribes have established gun control policies that match New Mexico state law and honor New Mexico concealed carry permits, other tribes do not recognize any concealed carry permit regardless of where it was issued, and have far more restrictive gun control laws. Tribes with laws that do not match New Mexico state law have policies on open and concealed carry that vary from No-Issue to Shall-Issue, depending on the tribal nation. Some Native American reservations that do allow open or concealed carry (but do not honor the New Mexico Concealed Handgun License) typically have established their own permitting systems, where applications for concealed carry permits are processed and adjudicated by the respective tribal council or tribal police. Permits on such reservations may be available to the general public or limited to tribal members, depending on the tribal nation policies. A few tribes completely ban firearms carry of any kind, except by law enforcement.

== Open and Concealed carry ==
New Mexico is a Shall-Issue state for the concealed carry of handguns, and permits the open carry of loaded firearms without a permit. A New Mexico Concealed Handgun License (CHL) is required by in-state residents to carry in a concealed manner a loaded handgun while on foot. Per state law, a firearm may be considered "loaded" when a magazine with live ammunition is inserted into the weapon and/or a live round is in the firing chamber, but there is no definition for a "loaded firearm" in New Mexico statutes. Additionally, state law (NMSA 29-19-2) defines a concealed handgun as "a loaded handgun that is not visible to the ordinary observations of a reasonable person." This definition creates legal ambiguity for partially-exposed weapons, as the firearm may be visible to one person and thus no violation of law occurs since it would be viewed as open carry. However, the same partially-exposed weapon may not be readily visible to a second person, thus potentially placing the carrying person in violation of the state's concealed carry law if the individual carrying does not have a valid license for concealed carry. A CHL is not required for open carry, concealed carry of an unloaded firearm on foot, or concealed carry of a loaded or unloaded firearm while in a vehicle (including motorcycles, bicycles, off-road vehicles, motor homes, or riding a horse). An applicant for a concealed carry permit must be a resident of New Mexico and at least 21 years of age. Each permit specifies the category and caliber of handgun that may be carried, but is also valid for a smaller caliber. The applicant must complete a state approved training course that includes at least 15 hours of classroom and firing range time, and must pass a shooting proficiency test for that category (e.g., revolver and semi-automatic) and caliber of handgun (must be between .32 and .50 caliber, as any caliber over .50 is considered a destructive device; calibers smaller than .32 are not allowed for CHL qualification). A permit is valid for four years, but license holders must pass the shooting proficiency test every two years. An applicant may appeal the denial of a Concealed Handgun License by requesting a hearing before the Department of Public Safety within 35 days of receipt of an Order of Denial for a CHL. An unfavorable ruling on the appeal by the DPS may be further appealed through the New Mexico courts. New Mexico currently recognizes concealed carry permits from or has reciprocal agreements with the following states: Alaska, Arizona, Arkansas, Colorado, Delaware, Florida, Idaho, Kansas, Michigan, Mississippi, Missouri, Nebraska, Nevada, North Carolina, North Dakota, Ohio, Oklahoma, South Carolina, Tennessee, Texas, Virginia, West Virginia, and Wyoming. New Mexico does not issue CCW permits to non-residents, except for Active Duty military members permanently assigned to a military installation within the state. Part-time residents with a valid New Mexico ID or Driver's license may apply for a New Mexico CHL. New Mexico does not recognize out-of-state nonresident permits held by in-state residents for concealed carry. In other words, New Mexico residents must hold a New Mexico CHL to lawfully carry a concealed, loaded handgun while on foot within the state.

New Mexico is a Permissive Open Carry state. Open carry of a loaded firearm without a license is legal statewide, except for restricted places listed in the section below. Provisions in the New Mexico Constitution prevent counties or municipalities from enacting ordinances restricting or banning open carry.

=== History ===
New Mexico's current concealed carry permit law was enacted in 2003. Prior to 2003, New Mexico was a hybrid No-Issue/Unrestricted state, where concealed carry was completely banned in incorporated cities and towns (although open carry without a permit has always been permitted statewide). In unincorporated rural areas, concealed carry without a license was legal. In 2001, state lawmakers passed a May-Issue concealed carry law that would have allowed cities and counties to opt out of honoring concealed carry permits and maintain outright bans on concealed carry. At the time, officials in most larger cities, notably Albuquerque and Santa Fe, strongly opposed the legalization of statewide concealed carry. After the May-Issue law was enacted but before it could go into effect, the City of Albuquerque filed a lawsuit (Baca v. New Mexico Department of Public Safety) to block implementation of the concealed carry law. Ultimately the May-Issue concealed carry law was struck down by the New Mexico Supreme Court before it could go into effect. The current Shall-Issue law, which pre-empted any existing local restrictions on firearms carry, was passed in 2003, with the issuance of Concealed Handgun Licenses beginning later that year, after surviving its own legal challenge by concealed carry opponents.

=== Restricted Places ===
Additionally, New Mexico law prohibits the carrying of firearms with or without a permit in the following locations or circumstances:

- K-12 schools (although a firearm may be kept in a vehicle while picking up or dropping off a passenger at a K-12 school)
- State and federal courthouses, unless specifically authorized by the presiding judge
- State colleges and university campuses, although firearms may be kept in locked vehicles while on campus; except that firearms may be carried in designated areas of the campus as part of a school-sponsored shooting event or ROTC program
- Military installations, except when authorized by the Installation Commander
- As of July 1, 2010, 30-7-3 NMSA a person licensed to carry a concealed handgun in New Mexico is allowed to legally carry into a licensed liquor establishment that DOES NOT sell alcohol for consumption on the premise. Further a person licensed to carry a concealed handgun in New Mexico is allowed to carry into a restaurant licensed to sell only beer and wine that derives no less than sixty percent of its annual gross receipts from the sale of food for consumption on the premises, unless the restaurant has a sign posted, in a conspicuous location at each public entrance, prohibiting the carrying of firearms, or the person is verbally instructed by the owner or manager that the carrying of a firearm is not permitted in the restaurant.
- Aboard public transportation (e.g., city buses and Rail Runner Express)
- Private property where owners or tenants state that no firearms are permitted on premises
- Secure areas of airports
- Native American reservations, unless permitted by the respective Tribal Council
- While under the influence of alcohol or drugs, including certain prescription or over-the-counter medications

Even with a concealed carry permit, it is not legal to carry a firearm into a federal building, school, or restaurant that serves alcohol. Carrying of a concealed weapon into a store that sells alcohol for off site consumption is legal, but open carry is not allowed in these locations, and constitutes a 4th Degree Felony. The state also has an "opt-out" statute, allowing home and business owners the ability to legally forbid firearms on their property and/or in their buildings with appropriately displayed signage stating such prohibition. While violating certain "gun free" areas carries legal penalties that can be punishable by up to 18 months imprisonment and/or a $5,000 fine, it is more common for those who inadvertently carry into such areas to be reprimanded by law enforcement officials and possibly have their concealed carry license suspended or revoked. For prohibitions of concealed carry on private property, New Mexico law does not require a specifically-formatted sign posted at such locations, and verbal notification of such prohibition has the force of law. Those who refuse to either leave or check their firearms upon notification of such prohibition may be charged with trespassing, a misdemeanor punishable by up to a year in county jail and/or $1,000 fine.

New Mexico has an "extended domain" law, which means that a person's vehicle (including motorcycles, bicycles, all-terrain vehicles, RVs, and while riding a horse) is considered an extension of their home. It is therefore legal to carry a loaded firearm without a permit, openly or concealed, anywhere in a vehicle. On foot, no permit is required to carry a firearm unless it is both loaded and concealed.

Concealed carry of an unloaded firearm is legal without a permit in New Mexico, however the same restrictions that apply to openly carried firearms apply. Persons under age 19 cannot carry in this manner unless traveling to certain sporting, recreational or training events as defined in law or on property controlled by parents, grandparents or guardians and under their supervision.

== Castle Doctrine and Stand Your Ground ==
Court precedents and New Mexico's 1907 self-defense law allow someone to use deadly force to stop an attack inside one's own home (to include lawfully-occupied apartments, condominiums, RVs and hotel rooms), but the state courts have ruled that the use of lethal force is not justifiable for the defense of property alone. The use of lethal force to protect one's life or that of a third party outside of the home remains a legal gray area in New Mexico, and such situations are handled by authorities on a case-by-case basis.

A 1946 ruling by the New Mexico Supreme Court (State v. Couch) held that defense of habitation alone, without specific statute, gave a homeowner the right to meet force with force “for a man’s house is his castle.” As a result of this ruling, judges provide a specific instruction to juries in self-defense cases, which states, “A person who is threatened with an attack need not retreat. In the exercise of his right of self defense, he may stand his ground and defend himself.” As applied to self-defense situations inside the home, the Couch ruling establishes the presumption that an aggressor unlawfully entering an occupied dwelling intends to inflict bodily harm on a homeowner or lawful occupant, thereby justifying the use of lethal force in such situations.

Authorities currently conduct investigations to determine on a case-by-case basis if the use of lethal force in self-defense was justified, particularly for situations occurring outside of the home. Factors that authorities consider in determining whether or not the use of lethal force was justified include: 1) whether the aggressor acted without provocation by the defender; 2) the aggressor reasonably posed a risk of bodily harm to the defender (or third party subject to the attack); 3) whether there was an avenue of escape available to the defender in order to avoid or evade the aggressor; and 4) whether the amount of force used to stop the attack was reasonable. Those who lawfully use lethal force in self-defense may still face prosecution and have to reference the 1946 Couch decision as an affirmative defense to any criminal charges arising from the incident. Additionally, one using lethal force in lawful self-defense does not have immunity either through statute or court precedents from potential lawsuits by the aggressor and/or his or her surviving relatives.

== See also ==
- 2023 Albuquerque gun ban
