= Rainbow Ryders Hot Air Balloon Company =

American company

- Type: Private
- Industry: Tourism; Recreation
- Founded: 1983 in the Rio Grande Valley, New Mexico, U.S.
- Founder: Scott Appelman
- Headquarters: Phoenix, Arizona, U.S.
- Area served: Southwestern U.S.
- Key people: Heather Appelman (President)
- Services: Hot air ballooning
- Number of employees: 110 (2023)
- Website: rainbowryders.com

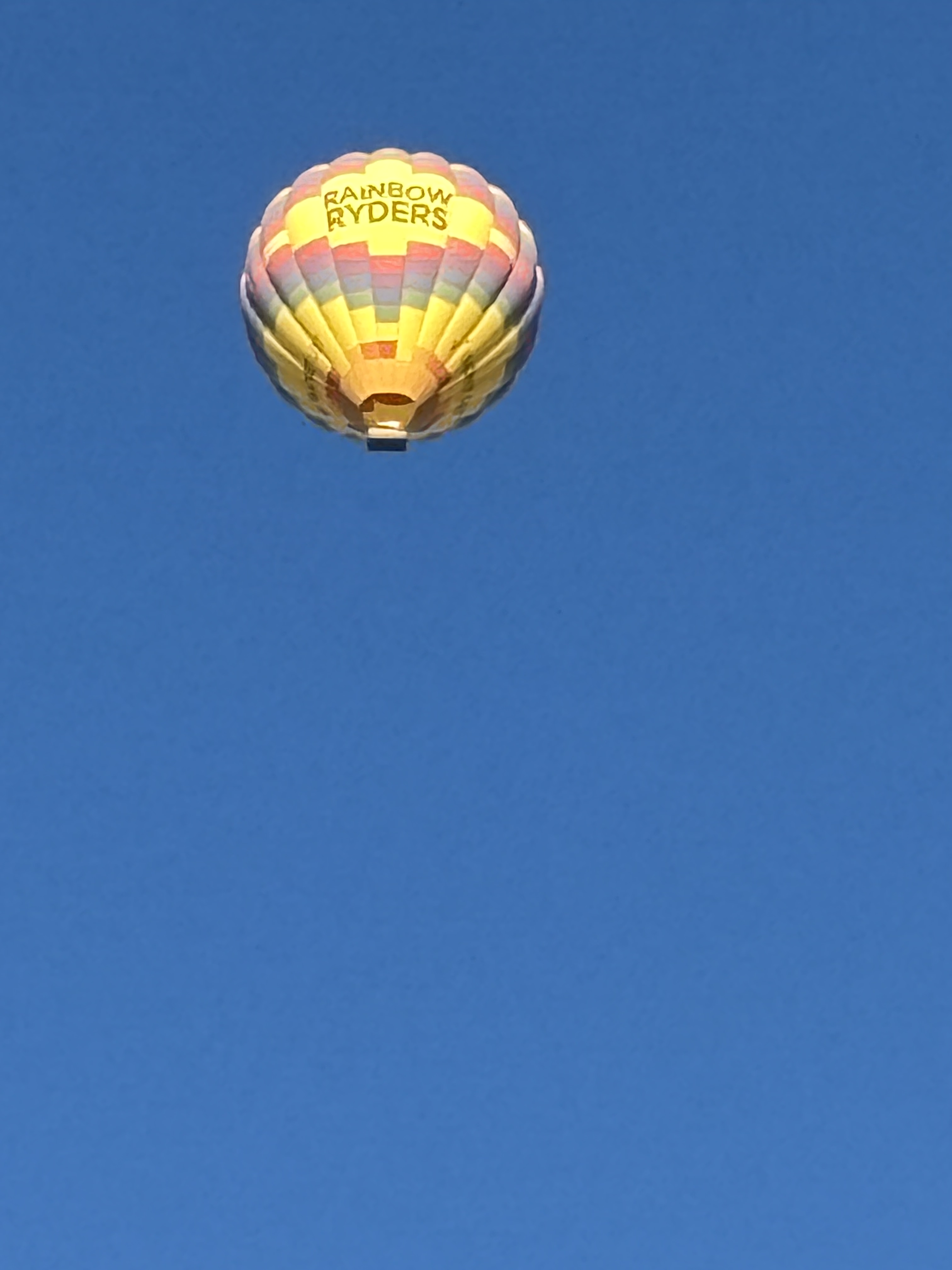
A Rainbow Ryders hot air balloon in Albuquerque in March 2026

Rainbow Ryders Hot Air Balloon Company is a hot air balloon company based in Phoenix, Arizona. It was founded by Scott Appelman in 1983, who served as its president until his death in 2024. It is led by Heather Appelman as of 2025.

The company services the Four Corners and is the largest hot air balloon company in its region. Since 1999, it has been Albuquerque International Balloon Fiesta's official ride concessionaire.

== History ==
Scott Appelman founded Rainbow Ryders Hot Air Balloon Company out of New Mexico’s Rio Grande Valley in 1983. The founder's interest in hot air balloons dated back to when we was 12 years old and attended the first Albuquerque International Balloon Fiesta. By college, he had pursued piloting hot-air balloons. After graduation, he was ballooning recreationally. Appelman founded Rainbow Ryders in Albuquerque, New Mexico with a single two-person balloon. The company opened its Phoenix, Arizona, office in 2009. Rainbow Ryders acquired Private Balloon Flights in 2017. Combined, the two companies had flown more than 300,000 customers to date. Before the COVID-19 pandemic, Appelman was flying two or three people a day. As of 2020, that number increased to as many as 220 per day. By 2023, Appelman says his sale increased by nearly 300 percent when compared to before the pandemic. Rainbow Ryders broke ground in 2023 on a 14,000-square-foot (1,300 m^{2}) facility in Glendale, Arizona, and opened it as its new headquarters in December 2023. The company expanded into Park City, Utah in 2024.

== Operations ==
=== Company ===
Founder Appelman was Rainbow Ryders' chief executive officer until his death in 2024. Heather Appelman was the company's president, as of 2025. It had 110 employees, as of 2023. Rainbow Ryders has operations in Phoenix, where it is headquartered, and in Albuquerque, New Mexico, and Colorado Springs, Colorado. It has balloon rides year-round in Arizona and part of the year in Colorado, and Utah, as of 2024. Local news outlets reported that in 2016, Rainbow Ryders had more than $4 million in revenue.

=== Flights ===
Rainbow Ryders has a fleet of 47 balloons across three states and is the largest hot air balloon business in its region, as of 2023. It flies 45,000 people each year, as of 2023. A routine goes up to nearly 5,000 feet above the ground and the average time in the air is an hour and 15 minutes. Appelman had piloted over 6,000 hours on hot air balloons, with him and his team having flown in 45 states, as of 2020. He estimated the company has flown over 750,000 people over 40 years, as of 2023.

== Events ==
Rainbow Ryders has been the Albuquerque International Balloon Fiesta's official ride concessionaire since 1999 and was named the official hot air balloon ride provider at the Balloon Fiesta in 2023. The company renewed the contract to serve as the official Fiesta balloon ride provider in March 2023. It is the official hot air balloon ride operator at the Scottsdale SkyFest & Balloon Glow, as of 2020.

== Recognition ==
After a 38-percent growth in revenue from 2014 to 2016, Albuquerque Business First placed Rainbow Ryders at number 20 for its fastest growing companies list. In 2016, TripAdvisor named the 15 best balloon rides in the world, with Rainbow Ryders included with four total four American companies in the ranking. That year, it was also on the Inc. 5000 fastest-growing companies list. USA Today ranked the company as second on the list of best hot air balloon rides in the United States in 2024.
