= 2026 in New Mexico =

- Decades: 2000s; 2010s; 2020s
- See also: History of New Mexico; Historical outline of New Mexico; List of years in New Mexico; 2026 in the United States

The following is a list of events of the year 2026 in New Mexico.

== Incumbents ==
=== State government ===
- Governor: Michelle Lujan Grisham (D)

== Events ==
- January 1 – Eight new bills take effect.
- March 9 – Investigators begin a search of Zorro Ranch, a former property of Jeffrey Epstein located near Stanley.
- March 17 – One person is killed in a domestic shooting at Holloman Air Force Base.
- March 24 – A New Mexico jury determines that Meta Platforms, owner of Facebook, Instagram, and WhatsApp, knowingly harmed children's mental health and concealed its knowledge of child sexual exploitation on its platforms.
- May 14 – A medical plane operated by Trans Aero MedEvac loses radio contact and crashes near Ruidoso, killing all four passengers on board.
- May 20 – Three people are killed and over a dozen are hospitalized after a chemical exposure in a Mountainair home. Authorities say the chemicals consisted of fentanyl, methamphetamine, and parafluorofentanyl.
- June 26 – New Mexico Attorney General Raúl Torrez opens an investigation into the Drug Enforcement Administration (DEA) following a report by the Associated Press that the DEA let multiple shipments of fentanyl into the state in a bid to build bigger criminal cases.
- August 5 – New Mexico sues the Department of Justice, accusing it of blocking state authorities from investigating Zorro Ranch.
- September 15 – Three Navajo people, including a 7-year-old girl and her grandmother, are killed in flooding near Newcomb. Navajo Nation President Buu Nygren declares a state of emergency over flooding.
- November 3 – 2026 New Mexico elections:
  - 2026 New Mexico gubernatorial election: Former interior secretary Deb Haaland wins the election. She is the first Native American governor in the United States.
  - 2026 New Mexico House of Representatives election
  - 2026 New Mexico Commissioner of Public Lands election
  - 2026 New Mexico Secretary of State election
  - 2026 United States House of Representatives elections in New Mexico
  - 2026 United States Senate election in New Mexico: Ben Ray Luján wins reelection.

== See also ==
- 2026 in the United States
