= 2023 in New Mexico =

- Decades: 2000s; 2010s; 2020s
- See also: History of New Mexico; Historical outline of New Mexico; List of years in New Mexico; 2023 in the United States

The following is a list of events of the year 2023 in New Mexico.

== Incumbents ==
=== State government ===
- Governor: Michelle Lujan Grisham (D)

== Events ==
- January 16 –Solomon Peña, a former Republican candidate for the New Mexico House of Representatives, is arrested by SWAT officers for his role in the shootings of at least four New Mexico Democratic politicians' houses.
- May 15 – 2023 Farmington, New Mexico shooting: Three civilians are killed and two police officers are injured in a mass shooting in Farmington. The shooter is killed by police.
- June 29 – Virgin Galactic successfully launches Galactic 01, its first private spaceflight, from Spaceport America.
- September 7 – Governor Michelle Lujan Grisham signs an emergency order banning firearms in Albuquerque and Bernalillo County for 30 days. A judge blocks the order six days later, citing the Second Amendment.
- October 7 – Research into the White Sands fossil footprints reveals that human settlement in North America may have originated earlier than previously assumed.

== See also ==
- 2023 in the United States
