= Salt Fire (2024) =

2024 wildfire in New Mexico, USA

- Part of the 2024 New Mexico wildfires
- Date: June 17, 2024 – unknown
- Location: Mescalero, New Mexico, United States
- Coordinates: 33°20′29″N 105°39′58″W

Statistics
- Burned area: 7,939 acres (32.13 km^{2}; 12.405 sq mi)

Ignition
- Cause: Under Investigation

Map
- Perimeter of the South Fork Fire (map data)
- The location of the Salt Fire, in southern New Mexico

The Salt Fire was a wildfire in New Mexico that burned 7,071 acres (2,862 ha) and was declared contained in July 2024. The fire began on June 17 near the town of Ruidoso, on the Mescalero Apache Reservation.

A state of emergency was also declared by New Mexico Governor Michelle Lujan Grisham.

== Incidents ==
The Salt Fire was first reported near Ruidoso on June 17, 2024, at approximately 2:20 PM MDT.

On June 18, 2024, New Mexico Governor Michelle Lujan Grisham declared a state of emergency in Lincoln County and the Mescalero Apache Reservation due to the Salt Fire and nearby South Fork Fire.

== See also ==
- South Fork Fire, a wildfire near the Salt Fire
- Wildfires in the United States during 2024
