= 2025 in New Mexico =

- Decades: 2000s; 2010s; 2020s
- See also: History of New Mexico; Historical outline of New Mexico; List of years in New Mexico; 2025 in the United States

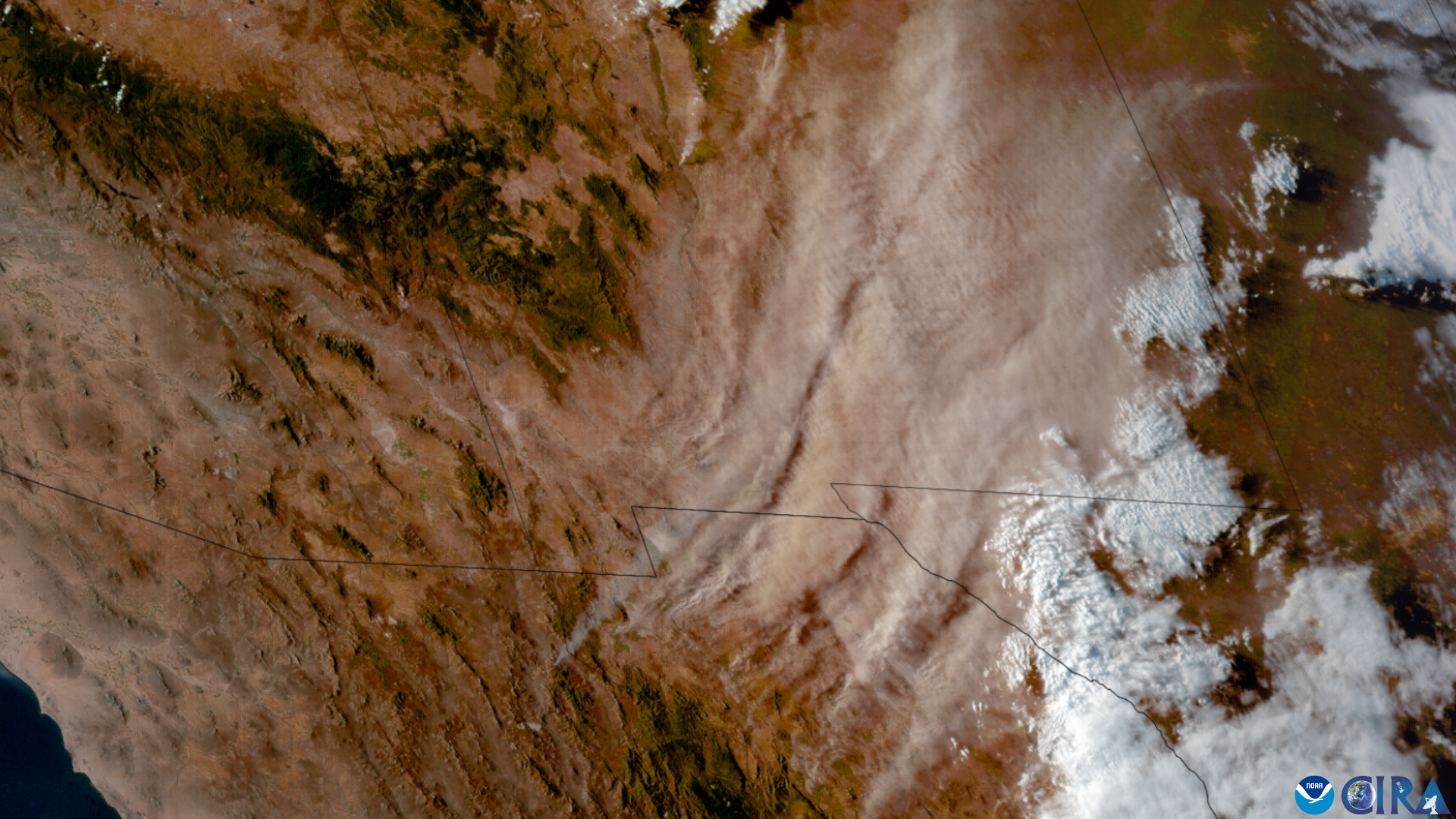
Large dust storm over Mexico

The following is a list of events of the year 2025 in New Mexico.

== Incumbents ==
=== State government ===
- Governor: Michelle Lujan Grisham (D)

== Events ==
Ongoing: 2025 Southwest United States measles outbreak

- February 11 – 2025 Southwest United States measles outbreak: The New Mexico Department of Health confirms the state's first measles case of 2025.
- February 26 – Actor Gene Hackman, pianist Betsy Arakawa, and one of their dogs are found dead in their Santa Fe home. It is determined that Arakawa died of hantavirus pulmonary syndrome on February 12. Hackman, who had Alzheimer's disease, died around February 18.
- March 21 – A shooting at a car meet-up in Las Cruces kills three people and injures 15.
- March 30 – The front entrance of the New Mexico Republican Party headquarters in Albuquerque is damaged in an arson attack .
- May 23 – Hannah Gutierrez-Reed, the armorer convicted of involuntary manslaughter in the shooting death of cinematographer Halyna Hutchins on the set of Rust in 2021, is released on parole.
- July 8 – A man and two children are killed in flash floods in Ruidoso.
- August 17 – Organizers announce that the Gathering of Nations event in Albuquerque will host its final pow-wow in 2026.
- November 4 –
  - 2025 Albuquerque mayoral election: No candidate receives more than 50% of the vote, resulting in a run-off election between incumbent Mayor Tim Keller and Darren White.
  - 2025 Santa Fe mayoral election: Michael Garcia wins election.
- December 9 – 2025 Albuquerque mayoral election: Tim Keller wins reelection in the run-off.

== See also ==
- 2025 in the United States
