= List of years in New Mexico =

This is a list of the individual New Mexico year pages. In 1912, the United States admitted the New Mexico Territory as the 47th state, establishing the state of New Mexico.

== 21st century ==
2010s
2010
2011
2012
2013
2014
2015
2016
2017
2018
2019

2020s
2020
2021
2022
2023
2024
2025
2026
2027
2028
2029

== See also ==
- History of New Mexico
- Outline of the history of New Mexico
- List of years in the United States
