= South Fork Fire (New Mexico) =

2024 wildfire in New Mexico, USA

- Part of the 2024 New Mexico wildfires
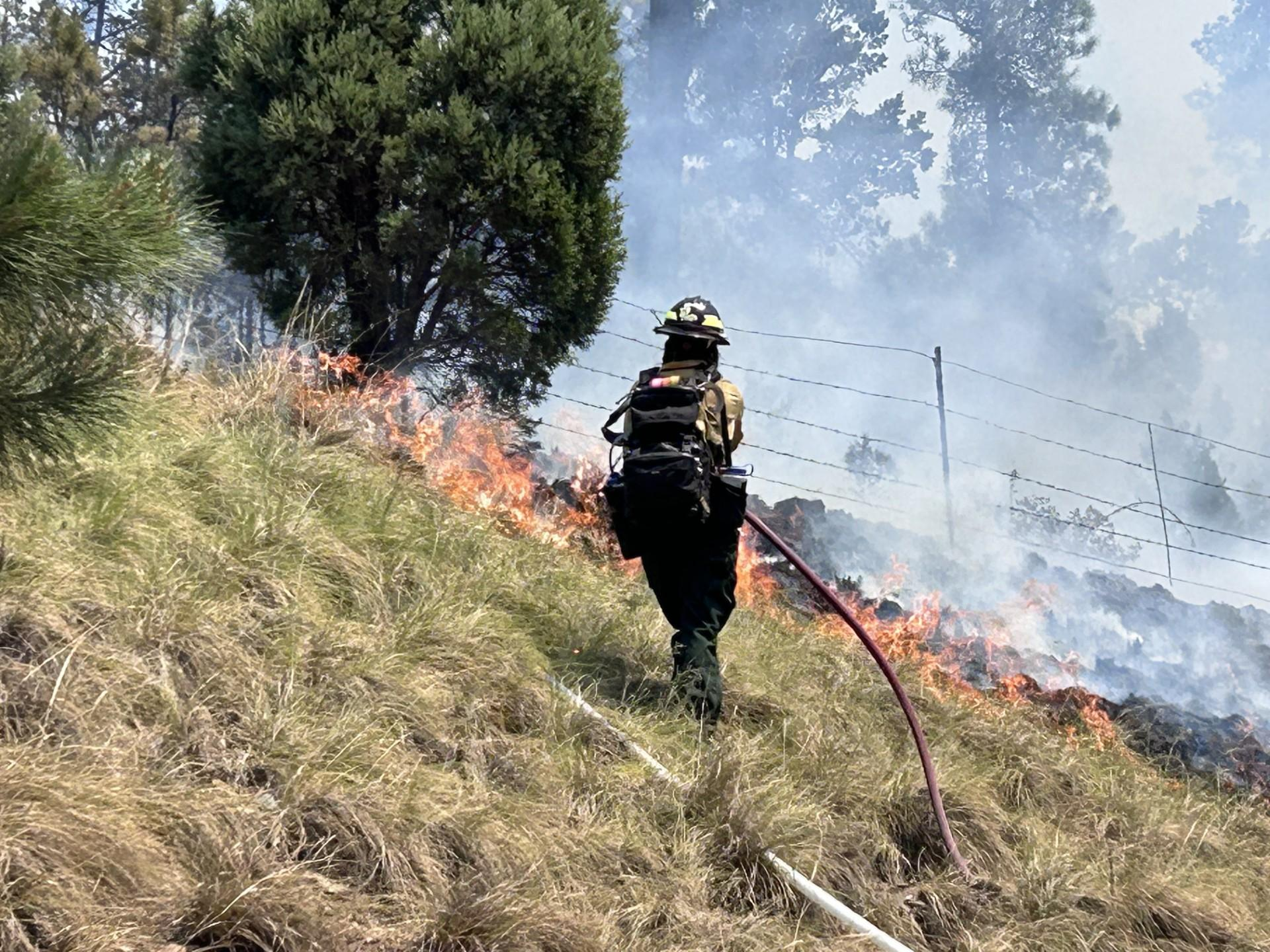
- Firefighter combatting the South Fork Fire on June 18
- Coordinates: 33°20′29″N 105°39′58″W

Statistics
- Burned area: 17,569 acres (71.10 km^{2}; 27.452 sq mi)

Impacts
- Deaths: 2 people
- Structures lost: At least 1,400 structures

Ignition
- Cause: Lightning

Map
- Perimeter of the South Fork Fire (map data)
- The location of the South Fork Fire, in southern New Mexico

The South Fork Fire was a wildfire in New Mexico that burned 17,569 acres (7,110 ha) before being declared 99% contained as of July 15, 2024. The fire began on June 17 near the town of Ruidoso and grew very rapidly, surpassing 15,000 acres burned by the following day and destroying at least 1400 houses and structures. Investigators have stated that a lightning strike caused the fire.

A state of emergency was also declared by New Mexico Governor Michelle Lujan Grisham.

== Incidents ==
The South Fork Fire was first reported near Ruidoso near the Mescalaro Apache Reservation on June 17, 2024, at approximately 9:07 AM MDT. Extreme fire behavior occurred across the South Fork on June 18, with crowning observed. Air resources worked in conjunction with ground resources, firefighters and heavy equipment, to continue constructing protective firelines including around structures. Firefighters quickly put out a spot fire on the South Fork Fire on June 18.

On June 18, 2024, New Mexico Governor Michelle Lujan Grisham declared a state of emergency in Lincoln County and the Mescalero Apache Reservation due to the South Fork Fire and nearby Salt Fire. That same day it was reported that one person had died from the fire. The following day another person was reported to have died due to the fire, as a result of the fire burning the vehicle they were in.

State and federal officials responded with over 800 firefighters and 40 Army and Air National Guardsmen to assist state police with traffic checkpoints.

== Closures ==
Various roads were closed due to the fire including stretches of Highway 48 and Highway 70 near Ruidoso, State Highway 48 from Alpine Village to State Highway 220 and U.S. Route 70 from mile marker 249 to mile marker 258.

== Evacuations ==
On June 17, 2024, at 7 PM MDT, just under 10 hours after the fire had begun, the entire town of Ruidoso, New Mexico was ordered to evacuate. Several evacuation centers have been set up in the city of Roswell, about 75 miles east of Ruidoso.

== Damage ==
Reports indicate that more than 1,400 structures have been destroyed by the fire.

== See also ==
- Salt Fire, a wildfire that burned near the South Fork Fire
