= 2023 Farmington, New Mexico shooting =

Mass shooting in New Mexico, U.S.

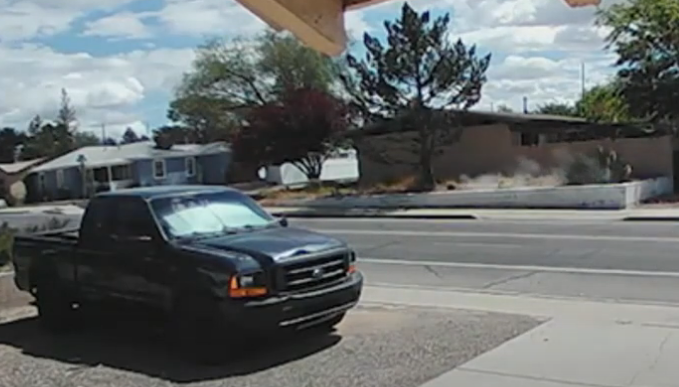
- Location: 36°45′6″N 108°11′23″W; Farmington, New Mexico, U.S.
- Date: May 15, 2023; 10:56–11:06 a.m. (UTC−6)
- Target: Members of the general public
- Attack type: Mass shooting
- Weapons: Black Rain Ordnance BRO-A2 AR-15 style semi-automatic rifle (.223 Remington); Stoeger STR-9 semi-automatic pistol (9mm); Browning 1911-22 A1 semi-automatic pistol (.22-caliber)
- Deaths: 4 (including the perpetrator)
- Injuries: 6
- Perpetrator: Beau Wilson
- Motive: Unknown

On May 15, 2023, a mass shooting occurred in Farmington, New Mexico, United States. Three people were killed, and six others were wounded, before the shooter, 18-year-old Beau Wilson, was killed by police.

== Shooting ==
The shooting began on May 15, 2023, at about 10:56 a.m. MDT. The shooting took place in the city of Farmington, 180 miles (290 km) northwest of Albuquerque.

The shooter shot at nearby homes and drivers while walking through the area. Police were dispatched at 10:57 a.m. and arrived by 11:02 a.m. The shooter was killed by police three to four minutes later. According to Farmington police, the shooter first fired at least 141 or 176 rounds from a rifle. He then discarded the weapon and began firing from two pistols, one a 9mm and the other a .22; at least 18 rounds were fired from the 9mm. At least seven houses and 11 vehicles were struck during the incident.

During the confrontation with police, the shooter shouted for them to "come kill me." The shooter had left a handwritten note which stated, in part, "if your [sic] reading this im [sic] the end of the chapter." The note also warned those who "Lay eyes or [dare] put a finger on my little sister there will be regrets."

According to an autopsy report, the assailant was struck nine times by police gunfire.

== Victims ==
Three women between the ages of 73 and 97 were killed. Those killed were in vehicles at the time of the shooting, with one victim dying after being transported to a local hospital. Two of the victims were related to each other and were traveling together to a nearby school. They were shot when attempting to pull over to render aid to the first victim. Six other people were injured by gunfire, including two responding police officers.

== Aftermath ==
Farmington Municipal Schools were placed in lockdown for almost two hours due to an initial belief by police that there was a second shooter involved. A vigil for the victims was held that night at a local church with additional vigils occurring throughout the week.

== Investigation ==
The Bureau of Alcohol, Tobacco, Firearms and Explosives said in a tweet at 12:55 p.m. that they were "assisting with a report of a mass shooting" in Farmington. The New Mexico State Police and the Federal Bureau of Investigation are also investigating the shooting.

== Perpetrator ==
The gunman was identified as 18-year-old Beau Wilson (October 2004 – May 15, 2023), a student at Farmington High School. He was reported to have a modified bullet-proof vest along with two "pistol-type weapons", later reported by Farmington police as .22 caliber and 9 mm pistols, and an AR-15 style rifle. According to local police, Wilson had legally purchased the AR-15 style rifle in late 2022 and purchased three AR-15 magazines days before the shooting, while the handguns were believed to have been owned by family members. Under New Mexico law, a person must be at least 19 in order to be in possession of a handgun. A member of the Farmington Police said at a news conference the day after the shooting that it was not clear if the family members were aware that the suspect was in possession of their handguns. His modified bullet-proof vest was useless due to being struck nine times by police gunfire.

== Reactions ==
Governor of New Mexico Michelle Lujan Grisham gave her condolences to the victims and said that the shooting "serves at yet another reminder of how gun violence destroys lives in our state and our country every single day". In a joint statement, New Mexico's five members of Congress stated they would promote gun control legislation. Nonprofit organization Brady Campaign, which focuses on preventing gun violence, also responded to the shooting.

In September 2023, Lujan Grisham issued an emergency order restricting carrying firearms in Albuquerque for 30 days in response to this and other shootings in New Mexico.

== See also ==
- List of mass shootings in the United States in 2023
