= Albuquerque International Balloon Fiesta =

Annual hot air balloon festival in New Mexico, United States

Coordinates: 35°11′46″N 106°35′51″W

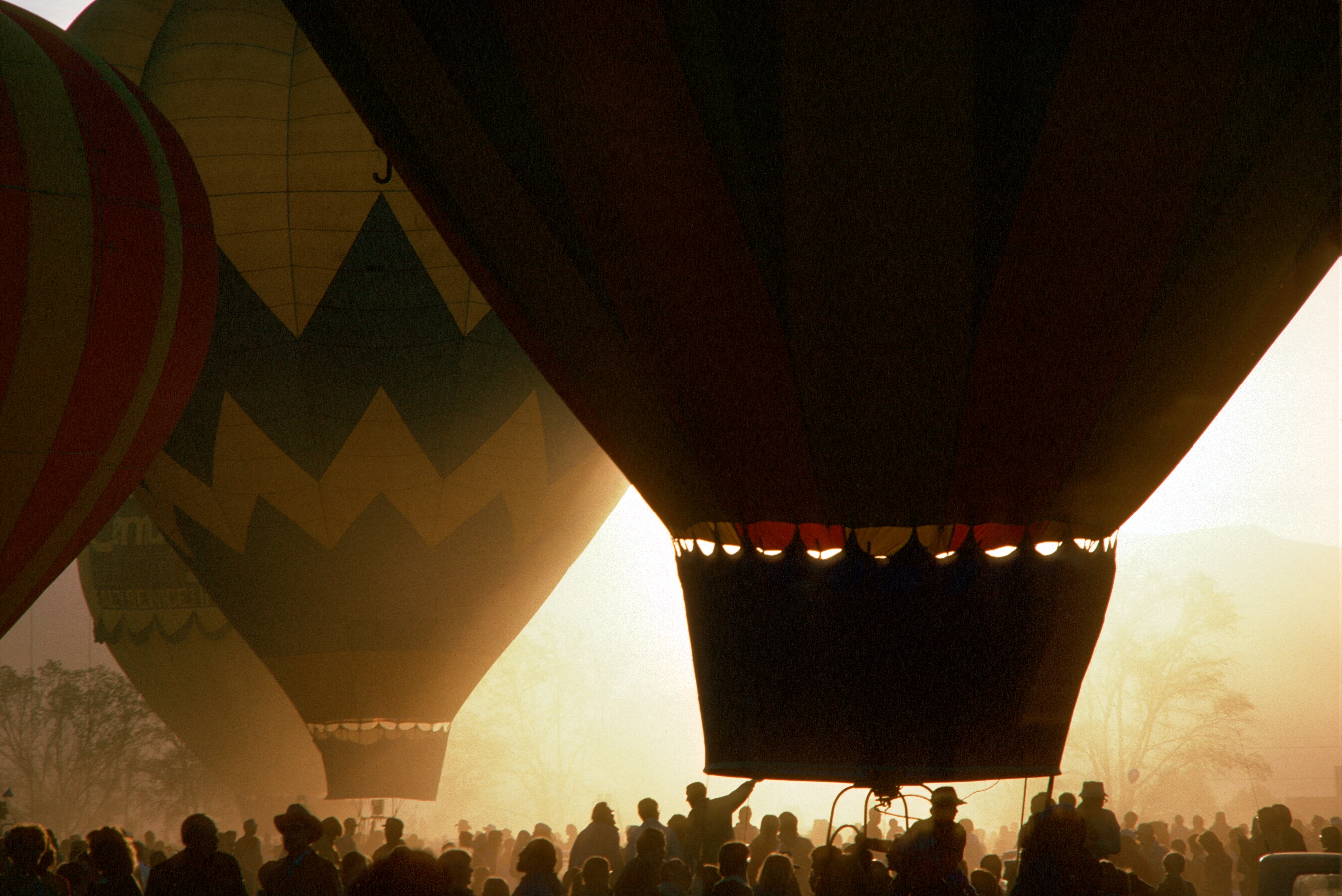
Dawn scene at the Albuquerque International Balloon Fiesta

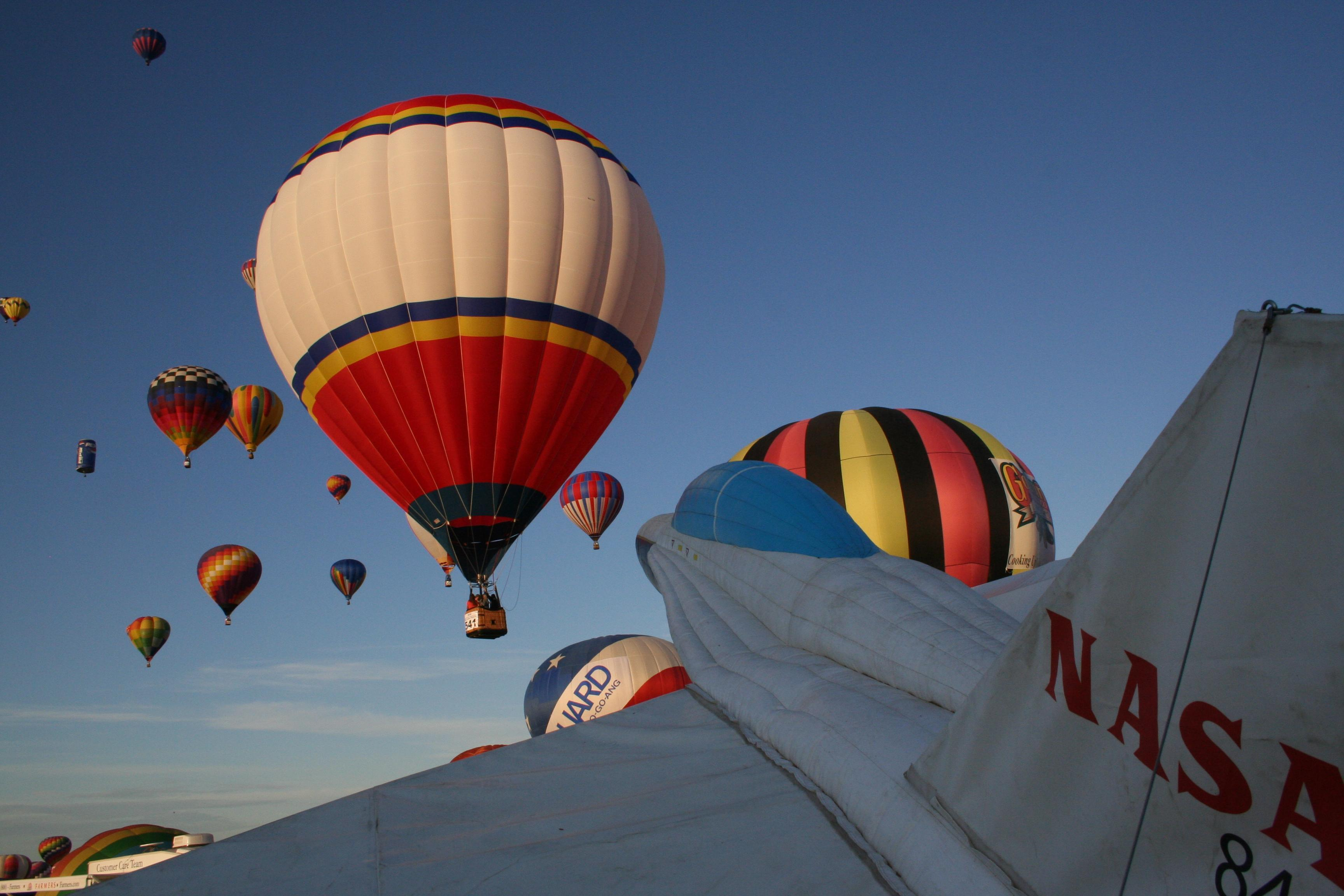
The nose of an inflatable half-scale model of a NASA F/A-18 in front of the NASA Aeronautics exhibit

The Albuquerque International Balloon Fiesta is a nine-day event occurring in the first full week of October in Albuquerque, New Mexico, United States. It has over 500 hot air balloons each year, far from its beginnings of merely 13 balloons in 1972. The event is the largest balloon festival in the world, as well as the most photographed annual event, attracting hundreds of thousands of visitors each year from around the globe.

== History ==
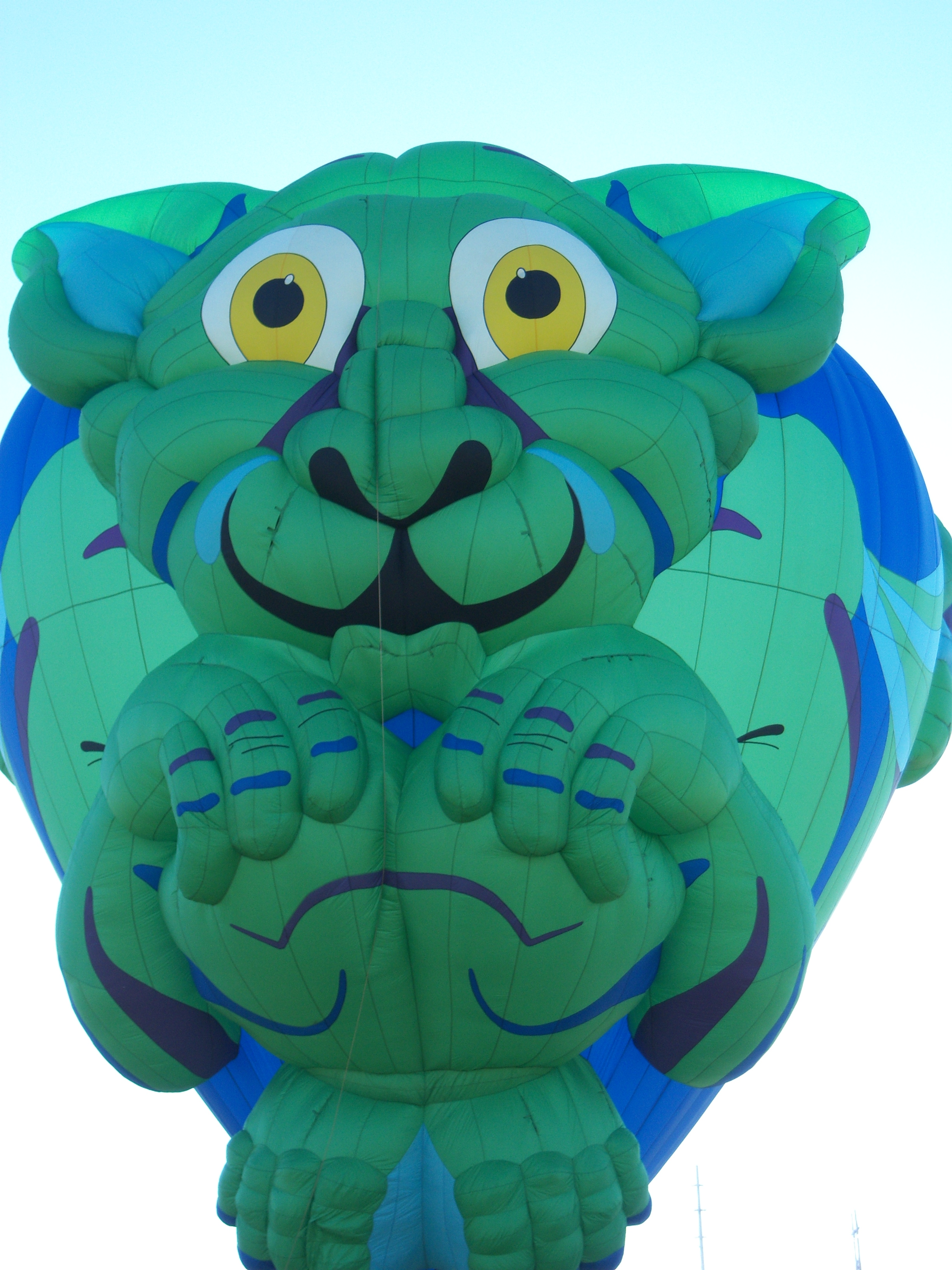
Gizzmo the Gargoyle, 2007 Fiesta

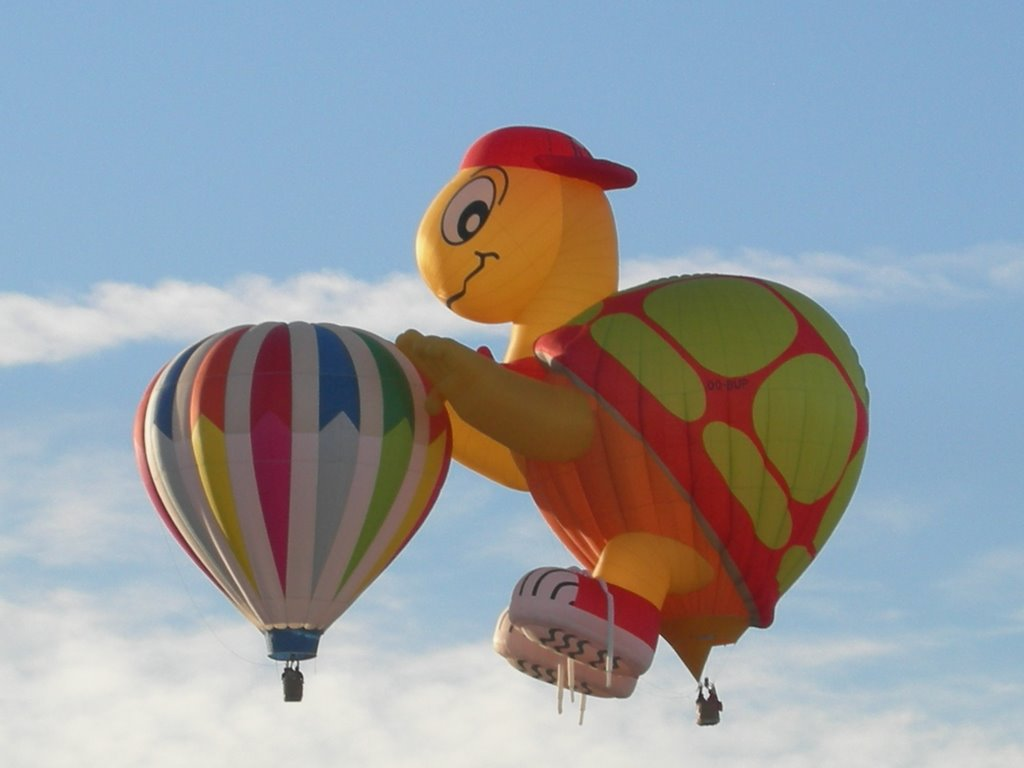
Close encounter among two balloons, 2007 Fiesta

The Balloon Fiesta began in 1972 as the highlight of a 50th birthday celebration for 770 KOB Radio. Radio station manager Dick McKee asked Sid Cutter, owner of Cutter Flying Service and the first person to own a hot air balloon in New Mexico, if KOB could use his new hot-air balloon as part of the festivities. The two began discussing ballooning, along with conversation and help from Oscar Kratz, and McKee asked what the largest gathering of hot air balloons to date had been (which had been 19 balloons in England). Kratz asked "Can we get 19 here?" Cutter agreed to try. He got commitments from 21 pilots, but bad weather kept some of them from arriving in time. The first fiesta ended up as a gathering of 13 balloons on April 8, 1972, sponsored by KOB. The first event was located in the parking lot of the Coronado Center Shopping Mall with 20,000 spectators and with balloonists from Arizona, California, Iowa, Michigan, Minnesota, Nevada and Texas taking part. McKee, Cutter, and Kratz are the three men who had originally started the balloon races. The first fiesta incorporated a "Roadrunner-Coyote Balloon Race" with 1 balloon being the "Roadrunner" and the others being "Coyote" balloons (the "Roadrunner" balloon was actually emblazoned with likenesses of both Warner Bros. characters). The winner of the race – the "Coyote" that landed closest to the Roadrunner – was Don Piccard, flying a balloon of his company's design and construction (his wife also placed in the race). This race has continued as part of the Balloon Fiesta today.

The next year Albuquerque hosted the first World Hot-Air Balloon Championships in February and the fiesta became an international event. In 1975 Albuquerque was looking at hosting the World Championships again, but the event was scheduled for October. So the fiesta was moved to correspond with the championships. To maintain interest in Albuquerque's bid to host the championships, a balloon rally was held in February of that year. Autumn being a far better flying time than February, the event has remained in early October to the present day.

The Balloon Fiesta grew each year for decades, and today is the largest balloon convention in the world. The number of registered balloons reached a peak of 1,019 in 2000, prompting the Balloon Fiesta Board to limit the number to 750 starting in 2001, citing a desire for "quality over quantity". The limit was changed to 600 in 2009 – citing recent growth in the city and a loss of landing zones. On any given day during the festival, up to 100,000 spectators may be on the launch field where they are provided the rare opportunity to observe inflation and take off procedures. Countless more people gather at landing sites all over the city to watch incoming balloons. The limit was increased to 1,000 in 2011.

The Balloon Fiesta 49th Edition, like most public gatherings in 2020, was postponed for one year due to the COVID-19 pandemic. It resumed the next year.

In 2023, an annular solar eclipse happened during the Balloon Fiesta.

== Events ==
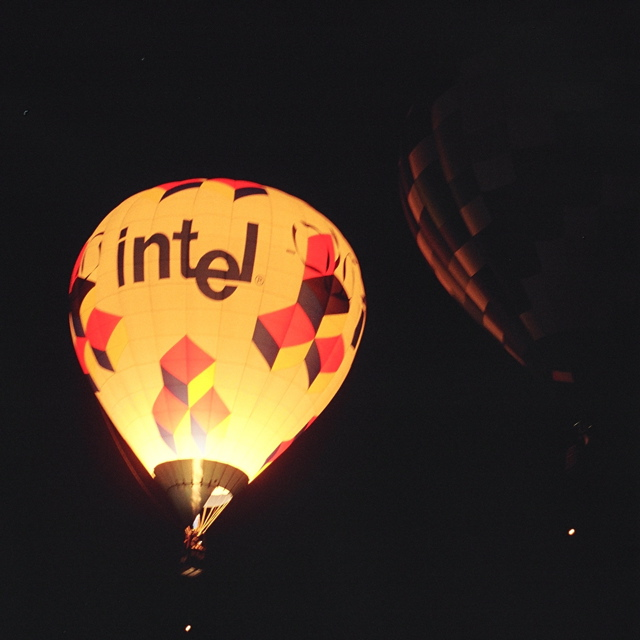

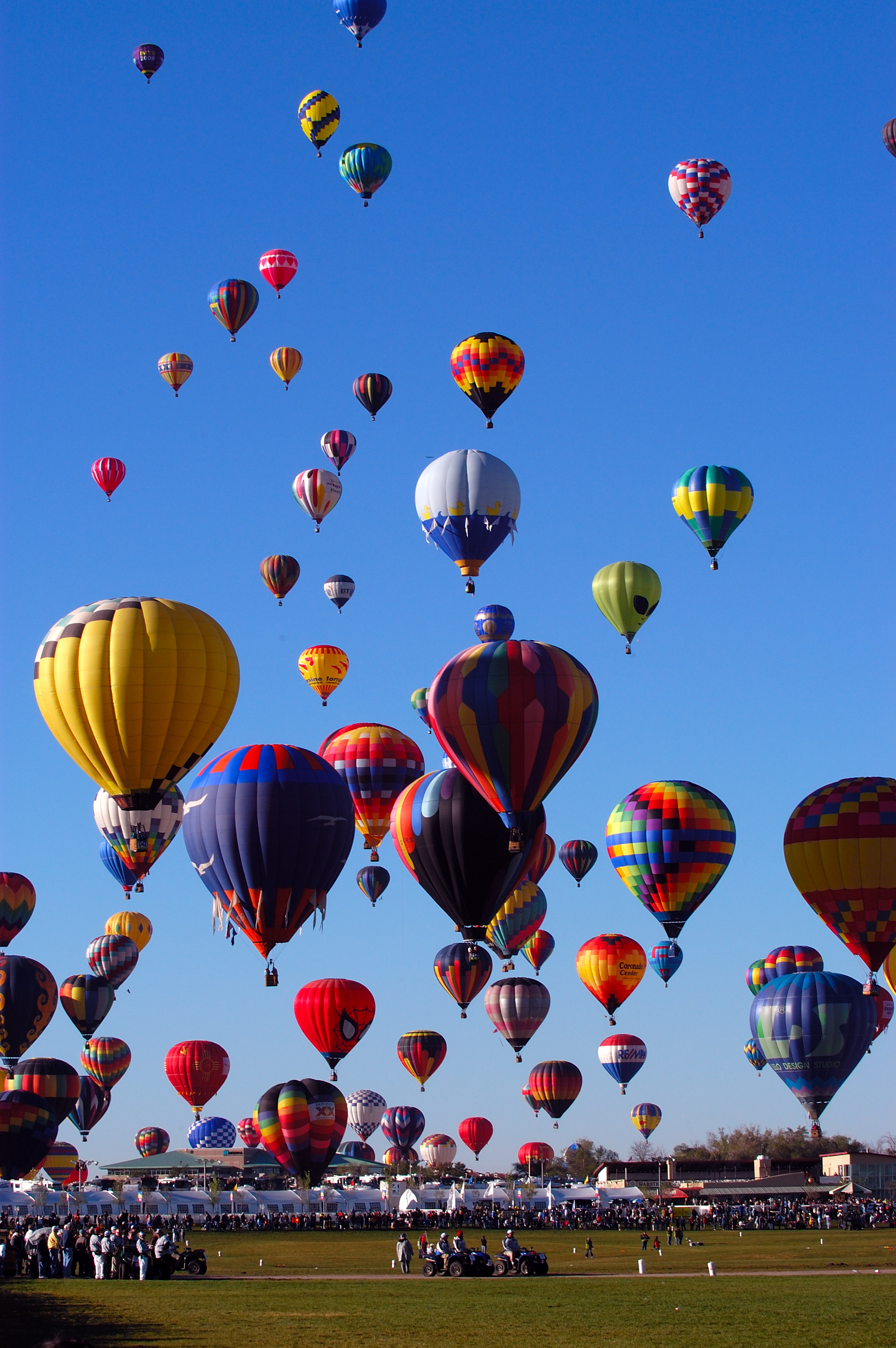
Mass ascension, 2006

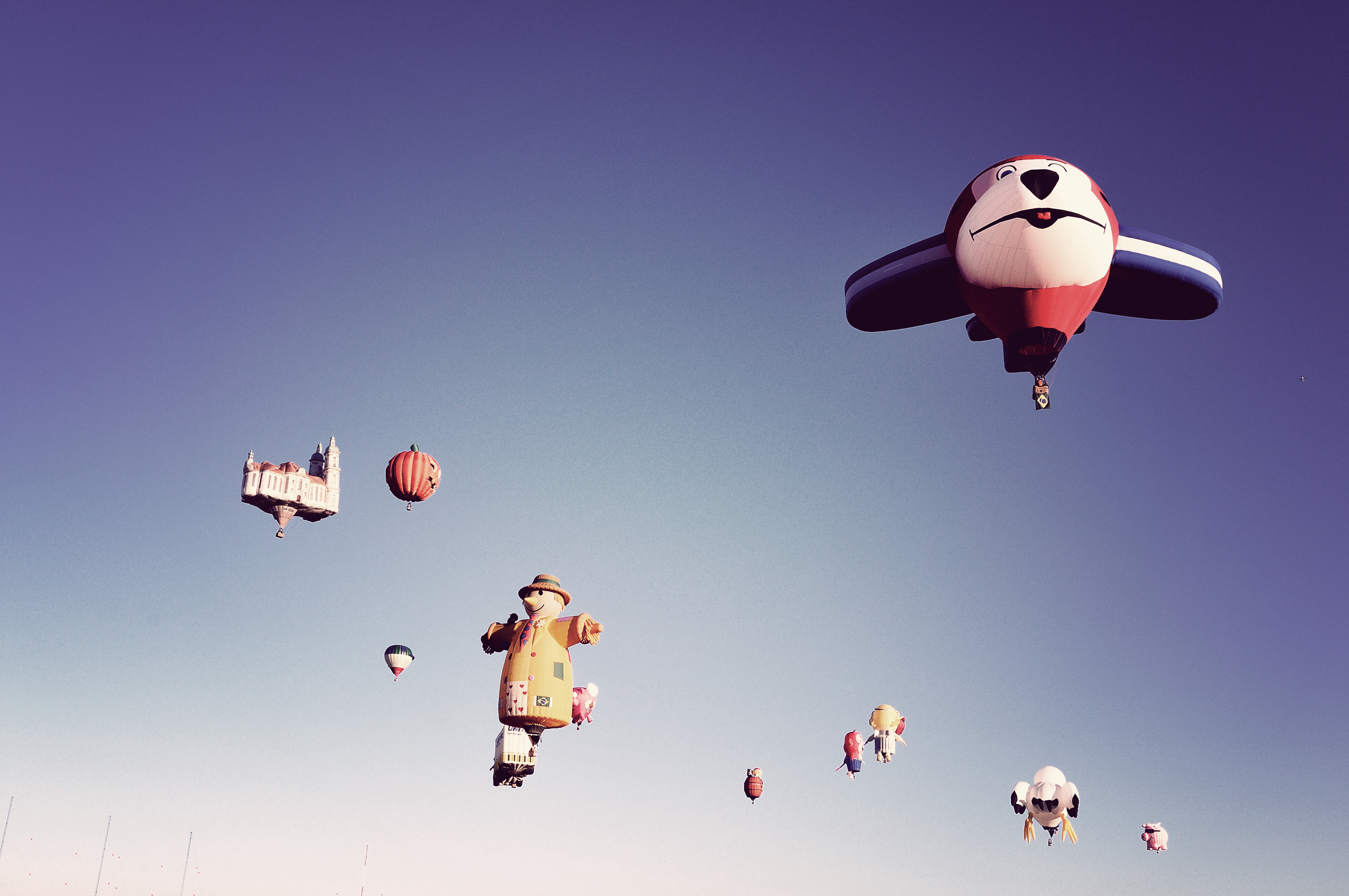
Special Shapes Rodeo, 2008

=== Dawn Patrol ===
The Dawn Patrol began at the Balloon Fiesta in 1978, when two California balloonists developed position lighting systems that allowed them to fly at night. Dawn Patrol pilots take off before sunrise and fly until it is light enough to see landing sites. Fellow balloonists appreciate the Dawn Patrol because they can watch the balloons and get an early idea of wind speeds and directions at different altitudes.

=== Mass Ascensions ===
One of the biggest events of the fiesta, where all participating balloons launch in two waves, filling the sky with hundreds of balloons at once. Launch directors, also known as "zebras" because of their black-and-white-striped outfits, serve as "traffic cops," coordinating the launch so balloons leave the field in a safe and coordinated manner. The first wave of the mass ascension typically begins at around 7 am, around the time of Albuquerque's sunrise in early October.

=== Artistic Vision ===
Many local artists take advantage of the balloons as favorite subject matter for their paintings. Balloons often land in Albuquerque neighborhoods. Many residents watch the balloons from the comfort of their backyards.

=== Special Shape Rodeo ===
Many non-traditional, uniquely shaped balloons are launched at the same time. Some of the most famous shapes include a milk cow, a wagon coach, twin bees, and many others like soda pop cans and animals. This is the most popular part of the event as families can see how balloons can be all different in shapes and sizes.

=== Balloon Glows ===
Large numbers of balloons are illuminated at night by their propane burners. They stand static and do not take off during these events. The "Glowdeo" is a night glow for the special shapes balloons. Evening Balloon glows are often followed by fireworks displays.

=== Special Events and Competitions ===
Various events like:

- Hot Air Balloon Target Competition, a game where balloonists attempt to drop a marker closest to a target on touch screen tables designed by Ideum.
- Weather or Not To Fly, a game where young balloonists attempt to fly their virtual balloons through different weather conditions on a touch screen table designed by Ideum.
- America's Challenge Gas Balloon Race, where special long-distance gas balloons are inflated and then launched. The winner of the race is the balloon that travels the farthest. Some balloons in the race have gone as far as Canada and the U.S. East Coast.
- The Flight of the Nations Mass Ascension, where balloonists from each nation launch, one at a time, to their national anthem and waving their nation's flag.
- Other piloting, skill, and speed competitions.
- Music Fiesta, the fiesta invites artists for concerts and shows.
- Rainbow Ryders Hot Air Balloon Company, the official balloon rides that people can book and enjoy.

== Local impact ==
The convention has also become a major showcase of New Mexican culture and history and features numerous cultural exhibitions. The fiesta is one of Albuquerque's largest tourist attractions and constitutes a major source of income for the city and local businesses. Albuquerque also has the most instate/resident balloonists at over 300 people. In 2015, the fiesta logged 955,703 visitors. Typically, tourists and fiesta visitors take thousands of pictures of the balloons, so it is no surprise that for several years the fiesta was sponsored by Kodak and was given the title the Kodak Albuquerque International Balloon Fiesta, though that title was usually only used in print ads and on official memorabilia. In 2018 the fiesta was presented by Canon, a Japanese camera and imaging company.

== Albuquerque box ==
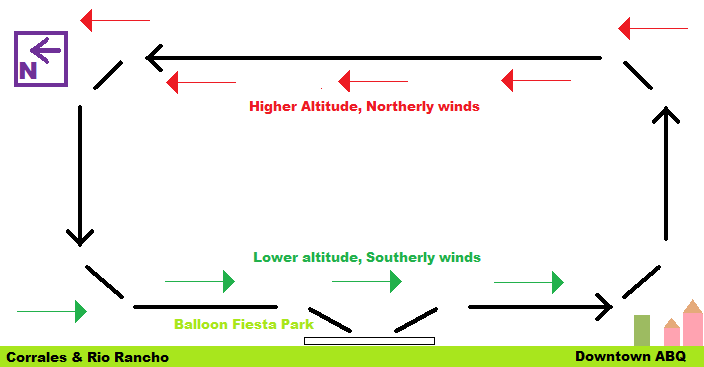
Diagram of the Albuquerque box effect when conditions are optimal

The success of the Fiesta depends in part on the cool Albuquerque morning temperatures in October and the Albuquerque box. The "box" is a set of predictable wind patterns that can be exploited to navigate the balloons. At low elevations the winds tend to be northerly (from the north), but at higher elevations they tend to be southerly. Balloonists use these winds to navigate in a vertical box: they ascend slightly from the launch park, move south, ascend further, move north, descend, and repeat the box or land back in the launch park or quite nearby. During events involving on-field targets, such as the "Key Grab" (where pilots attempt to grab prizes, including a set of keys to a new vehicle, from atop tall, flexible poles), it's not uncommon to see the same balloon make 5 or 6 passes at the targets, simply by working the "Box" to keep returning to the field.

== Location ==
Balloon Fiesta Park, from which the balloons are launched, is located on the northern edge of the city. The park is a multi-use field and is home to many other events throughout the year. In 2005, the Anderson-Abruzzo Albuquerque International Balloon Museum was opened on the grounds. The museum is dedicated to the history, science, sport, and art of ballooning and other innovative forms of flight.

== Organization ==
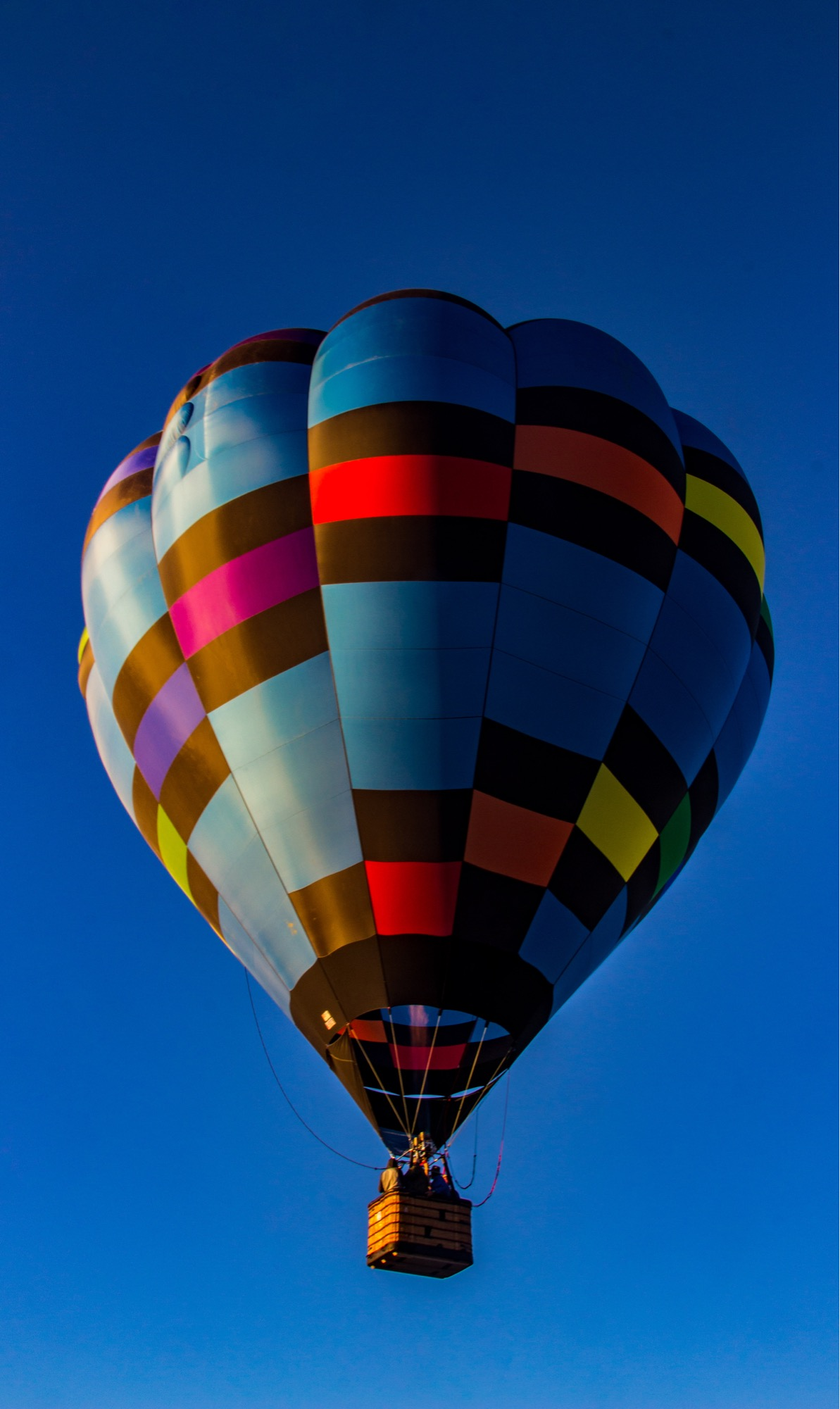
A balloon takeoff, 2019

The Balloon Fiesta is organized by Albuquerque International Balloon Fiesta, Inc., a 501(c)(3) non-profit organization.

== Trademark ==
Albuquerque International Balloon Fiesta, Inc. owns the trademark for the name "Balloon Fiesta".

== Incidents ==
=== 2004 radio tower collision ===
On October 9, 2004, while landing, a Smokey Bear imaged balloon collided with, and became entangled in, one of KKOB's radio transmitter towers. The three passengers were able to climb out of the basket onto the tower. However, the tower was energized and could have led to electrocution once the passengers set foot on ground, so KKOB shut down its transmitter following the accident in order to enable them to climb down to safety. This accident was recorded by several local television stations, and the footage has become a standard story on a number of televised reality programs which deal with "caught on camera" incidents.

=== 2024 radio tower collision and collapse ===
On the morning of October 11, 2024, a balloon named Blue Moon from Tucson, Arizona, USA, collided with one of the guy wires of the KKOB tower, causing the tower to collapse. No one was injured in this incident, and the pilot subsequently made a safe landing.

== See also ==
- Hot air balloon festivals
