= 2023 Albuquerque gun ban =

2023 New Mexico executive order

On September 7, 2023, the Governor of New Mexico, Michelle Lujan Grisham signed an emergency order banning firearms in Albuquerque and Bernalillo County for 30 days.

== Background ==
Lujan Grisham gave the order in response to three mass shootings that occurred in New Mexico in 2023, including the Farmington, New Mexico shooting. On September 13, U. S. District Judge David H. Urias blocked enforcement of the ban until October 3, citing the Second Amendment to the United States Constitution.

== Further developments ==
On September 16, Lujan Grisham narrowed the ban to playgrounds and parks and "other public areas provided for children to play in." A third order dropped this last clause, and Urias let the ban on guns in playgrounds and parks stand. On October 16, 2024, Lujan Grisham announced that she would not be extending the order.

== Text of the order ==
The section of the first emergency order suspending the right to carry in public read as follows:

(1) No person, other than a law enforcement officer or licensed security officer, shall possess a firearm, as defined in NMSA 1978, Section 30-7-4.1, either openly or concealed, within cities or counties averaging 1,000 or more violent crimes per 100,000 residents per year since 2021 according to Federal Bureau of Investigation’s Uniform Crime Reporting Program AND more than 90 firearm-related emergency department visits per 100,000 residents from July 2022 to June 2023 according to the New Mexico Department of Public Health, except:

A. On private property owned or immediately controlled by the person;

B. On private property that is not open to the public with the express permission of the person who owns or immediately controls such property;

C. ‘While on the premises of a licensed firearms dealer or gunsmith for the purpose of lawful transfer or repair of a firearm;

D. While engaged in the legal use of a firearm at a properly licensed firing range or sport shooting competition venue; or

E. While traveling to or from a location listed in Paragraphs (1) through (4) of this section; provided that the firearm is in a locked container or locked with a firearm safety device that renders the firearm inoperable, such as a trigger lock.

== Reaction ==
Albuquerque Police Chief Harold Medina and Bernalillo County Sheriff John Allen both said they would not enforce the original order, with the latter stating that he believed it was unconstitutional. Likewise, Attorney General of New Mexico Raúl Torrez said he would not defend the governor's administration against lawsuits challenging the order.

== See also ==
- Gun laws in New Mexico
