= 2024 New Mexico wildfires =

Natural disasters in the USA

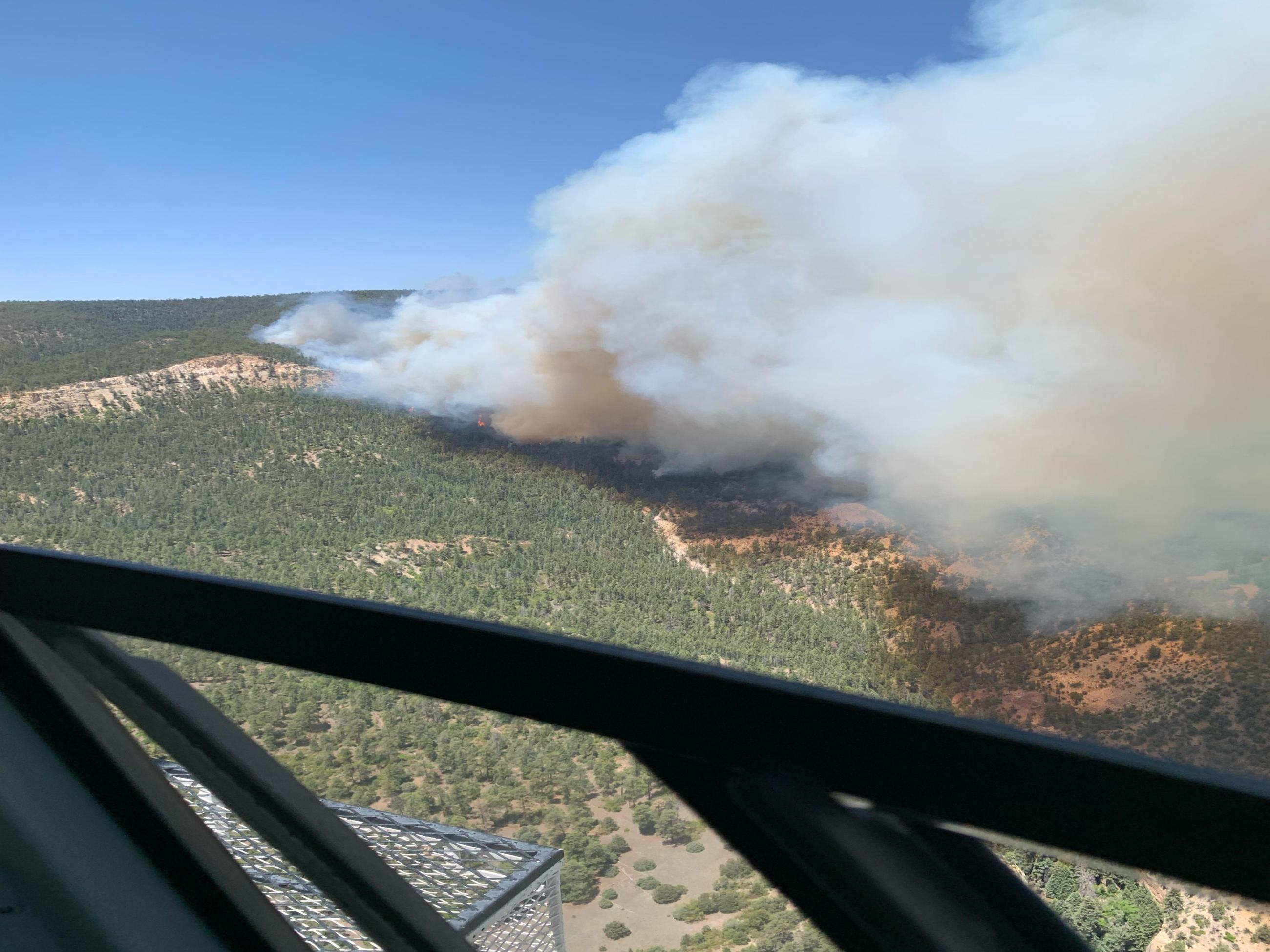
- Aerial view of the Indios Fire on May 23

Impacts
- Deaths: 2
- Structures destroyed: 900+ damaged or destroyed
- Cost: $1.8 billion

The 2024 New Mexico wildfire season was a series of wildfires that burned throughout the U.S. state of New Mexico.

== Background ==
While "fire season" can vary every year in New Mexico based on weather conditions, most wildfires occur in from early May through June, before the monsoon season. However, there is an increasing fire risk year-round from climate change. Droughts are becoming more common partly from rising temperatures in the state that evaporate water from streams. Unpredictable monsoon levels can increase fire risks. New Mexico is prone to strong winds, and jet stream disruption from climate change can make them stronger. Intense winds contribute to drought, allow wildfires to spread, and dry out vegetation. Unique plant life and fine fuels in the state fuel wildfires, especially in the Eastern New Mexico grasslands. Rising temperatures will reduce snowpack and shorten the snowmelt season which can increase drought and wildfire severity.

Overgrazing and logging in the late 1800s and over 100 years of strict fire suppression affected natural systems of New Mexico led to a growing wildfire risk and intensity. Scientists predict New Mexico's forests will gradually deteriorate, turning into shrublands as wildfires burn the forests.

== Summary ==
By early August, New Mexico experienced an active wildfire season, with the Sangre de Cristo Mountains and Gila National Forest regions particularly affected. The Coyote Creek Fire, which started on August 5 near Lincoln County, ultimately burned 6,780 acres and prompted temporary road closures and evacuations of a few remote ranches. Earlier in the season, the Black Mesa Fire, ignited by lightning in mid-June near San Juan County, charred 3,450 acres—the first major wildfire of the year in the state—before being fully contained by early July.

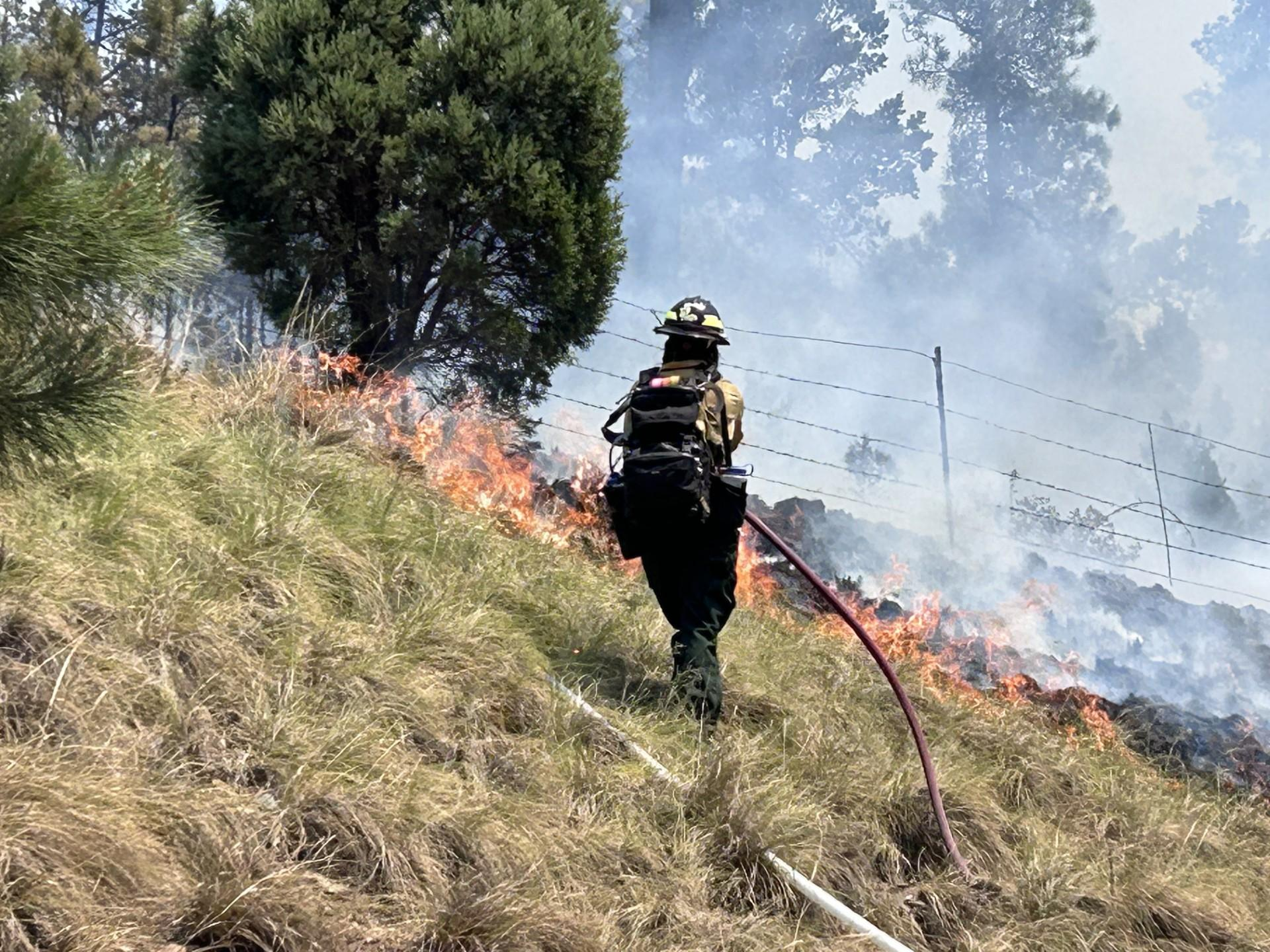
Firefighter on the South Fork Fire on June 18

The late spring and summer period was marked by dry fuels, low humidity, and strong winds, leading to rapid fire spread across forested and grassland areas. The Red Hills Fire, which began near Alamogordo in late July, consumed over 5,200 acres and damaged several outbuildings, requiring aggressive firefighting tactics including backburning and aerial water drops. Another incident, the Piedra Lumbre Fire, covering roughly 1,800 acres, threatened recreational areas along the Rio Grande, highlighting the state’s ongoing wildfire management challenges.

New Mexico state wildfire suppression spending in 2024 reached approximately $15 million, driven largely by these larger incidents. The New Mexico State Forestry Division also distributed $2.5 million in community mitigation grants to enhance preparedness in vulnerable rural areas facing persistent drought conditions.

== List of wildfires ==
The following is a list of fires that burned more than 1,000 acres (400 ha), or produced significant structural damage or casualties.

Name	County	Acres	Start date	Containment date (Note: Containment means that fire crews have established and secured control lines around the fire's perimeter. These lines are artificial barriers, like trenches or cleared vegetation, designed to stop the fire's spread, or natural barriers like rivers. Containment reflects progress in managing the fire but does not necessarily mean the fire is starved of fuel, under control, or put out.)	Notes	Ref
Blue 2	Lincoln	7,532	May 17	September 11	Fire caused by lightning on Lincoln National Forest.	
Indios	Rio Arriba	11,477	May 19	August 2	Fire caused by lightning on Santa Fe National Forest and managed for ecological benefit.	
Antone	Catron	12,455	June 7	July 30	Fire caused by lightning on Gila National Forest and managed for ecological benefit.	
Encerrita	Cibola	2,496	June 15	August 28	Fire was caused by lightning on El Malpais National Monument.	
South Fork	Otero & Lincoln	17,569	June 17	August 26	A mandatory evacuation order was issued for all of Ruidoso. Approximately 1,400 structures were lost, and two fatalities were reported.	
Salt	Otero	7,939	June 17	August 26	Evacuations were prompted in the Mescalero Apache Reservation, and for the village of Ruidoso Downs on 18 June 2024. Over 400 structures were damaged or destroyed.	
Ridge	Catron	4,257	July 2	September 19	Fire caused by lightning on the Gila National Forest.	
Fisher	Socorro	8,044	July 4	July 21	Fire caused by lightning on the Cibola National Forest and managed for ecological benefit.	
Paramount	Sierra	1,328	July 12	August 19	Fire caused by lightning on the Gila National Forest.	
Tanques	Rio Arriba	6,645	July 18	August 21	Caused by natural factors.	
Island	Union	1,600	August 22	August 28	Caused by natural factors.	

Perimeters of 2024 New Mexico wildfires (map data)
