= Cannabis in New Mexico =

New Mexico's non-ASTM D8441/D8441M Cannabis Universal Symbol

Cannabis in New Mexico is legal for recreational use as of June 29, 2021. A bill to legalize recreational use – House Bill 2, the Cannabis Regulation Act – was signed by Governor Michelle Lujan Grisham on April 12, 2021. The first licensed sales of recreational cannabis began on April 1, 2022.

Medical use was legalized in 2007 through a bill signed by Governor Bill Richardson. A 1978 law also allowed for medical use, but only through a federally-approved research program. It was the first medical cannabis law enacted by any state.

== State policy ==
=== Prohibition (1923) ===
In 1923, New Mexico banned the cultivation, importation, and sale of cannabis. The Santa Fe New Mexican noted:

The Santa Fe representative, however, had better luck with his bill to prevent sale of marihuana, cannabis indica, Indian hemp or hashish as it is variously known. This bill was passed without any opposition. Marihuana was brought into local prominence at the penitentiary board's investigation last summer when a convict testified he could get marihuana cigarettes anytime he had a dollar. The drug produces intoxication when chewed or smoked. Marihuana is the name commonly used in the Southwest and Mexico.

=== Controlled Substances Therapeutic Research Act (1978) ===
In 1978 New Mexico became the first state to pass legislation allowing the medical use of cannabis in some form. Known as the Controlled Substances Therapeutic Research Act, the bill allowed the use of cannabis through a research program approved by the Food and Drug Administration, using cannabis supplied by the National Institute on Drug Abuse. The bill was spurred by the efforts of cancer patient Lynn Pierson, who found relief from using cannabis and pleaded his case to state lawmakers that he should be allowed to use the drug. His efforts were rewarded in February 1978 when the bill was signed into law, following its passage in both chambers of the legislature by wide margins. However, the program still required federal approval, which would not come until August 1978, shortly after Pierson died due to his illness. The approval was then rescinded a few weeks later, but in November 1978 the final go-ahead was given, and cannabis was delivered to the state two months later. Between 1978 and 1986, approximately 250 cancer patients received either cannabis or THC through the Lynn Pierson Therapeutic Research Program (named in honor of Pierson after his death).

=== Governor Johnson endorses legalization (1999) ===
In 1999, Republican Governor Gary Johnson set off a political firestorm in the state when he endorsed the policy of drug legalization. In particular, Johnson called for the legalization of cannabis and said that the drug's dangers had been significantly exaggerated. His comments regarding legalization were soon condemned by various law enforcement officials, the lieutenant governor, and the Republican Party. Darren White, the secretary of the New Mexico Department of Public Safety, resigned in protest. Drug czar Barry McCaffrey made a special trip to Albuquerque to denounce the governor's comments which he called "astonishing" and "embarrassing". Johnson did not back down, however, and continued to advocate for legalization as he finished out his second term. He became the highest-ranking elected official in the country to endorse such a position.

=== Medical use legalized (2007) ===
In April 2007, Governor Bill Richardson signed into law Senate Bill 523, the Lynn and Erin Compassionate Use Act. The bill allowed the use of cannabis with a physician's recommendation for treatment of certain medical conditions such as HIV/AIDS, cancer, glaucoma, multiple sclerosis, and epilepsy. In later years the list of qualifying conditions was expanded, and an allowance for cultivation by patients was added as well. Senate Bill 523 passed the Senate by a vote of 32–3 and the House by a vote of 36–31, making New Mexico the 12th state to legalize medical use and the 4th to do so through an act of state legislature.

=== House approves legalization (2019) ===
In March 2019, House Bill 356 was approved by the House of Representatives by a 36–34 vote. The bill sought to legalize the recreational use of cannabis and establish a system for the distribution of cannabis through dispensaries run by the state. After passing in the House it stalled in the Senate Finance Committee, but Governor Lujan Grisham announced that she would add the issue to the legislative agenda for the upcoming year. The passage of the bill marked the first time that either chamber of the legislature had voted to legalize recreational cannabis.

=== Decriminalization (2019) ===
In April 2019, Senate Bill 323 was signed into law by Governor Lujan Grisham. It made first-time possession of up to 1/2 ounce (14 g) of cannabis a petty misdemeanor offense, punishable by a $50 fine. It also decriminalized possession of drug paraphernalia, making New Mexico the first state to do so. SB 323 passed the House by a 44–20 vote and the Senate 30–8. It went into effect on July 1, 2019.

=== Medical program expansion (2019) ===
In April 2019, Governor Michelle Lujan Grisham signed into law Senate Bill 406, the first major change to the Lynn and Erin Compassionate Use Act since it was enacted in 2007. The bill included reforms to allow the medical use of cannabis in public schools, protect medical cannabis patients from losing custody of their children, provide employment protections for patients in non-safety sensitive positions, allow patients to renew their medical cannabis card every three years instead of one, allow medical cannabis cardholders from other states to use cannabis, allow the consumption of medical cannabis at dispensaries, and prevent denial of an organ transplant due to being a medical cannabis patient. A similar bill passed the legislature in 2017 but was vetoed by Governor Susana Martinez.

=== Cannabis Legalization Working Group (2019) ===
In June 2019, Governor Lujan Grisham announced the formation of the Cannabis Legalization Working Group to determine the best path forward for legalization during the 2020 legislative session. Said Grisham: "This group will ensure we begin the next session with a credible, equitable, and cohesive legalization proposal that will incorporate all public safety concerns, workplace regulations, labeling requirements that protect underage children, and all manner of other issues." The working group consisted of over 20 individuals from varying backgrounds including state lawmakers, cabinet secretaries, law enforcement officials, and medical cannabis executives.

The Cannabis Legalization Working Group released a report detailing its recommendations in October 2019. "Through more than 30 hours of public meetings across the state, and with the help of more than 200 pages of public comment, the members explored every aspect of legalization, both good and bad," said the chair of the working group, Albuquerque City Councilor Pat Davis.

=== Recreational use legalized (2021) ===
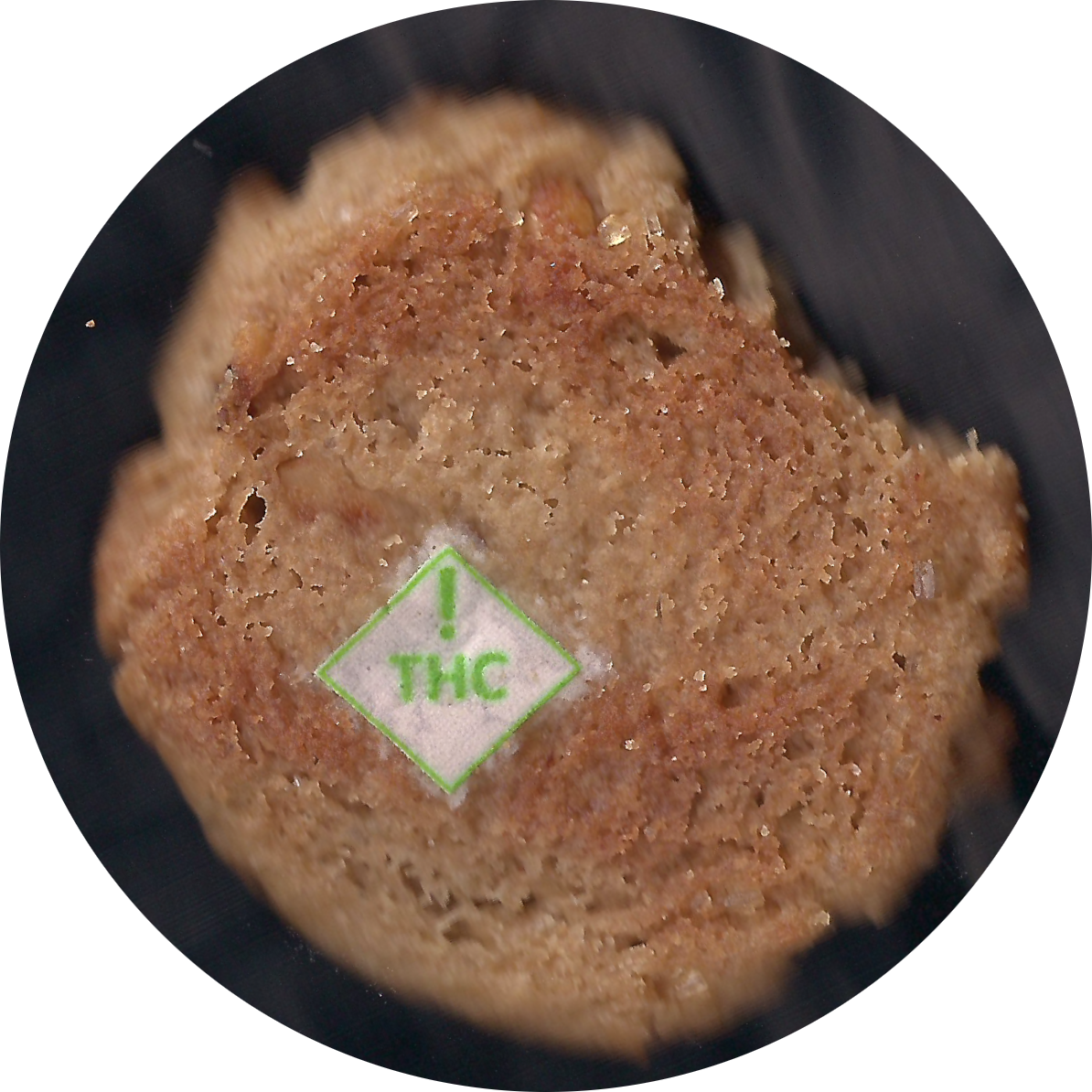
Cannabis edible purchased recreationally from a store in Eldorado at Santa Fe

House Bill 2, the Cannabis Regulation Act, was signed into law by Governor Lujan Grisham on April 12, 2021. It passed the House 38–32 and the Senate 22–15 during a special legislative session called by the governor, after the legislature failed to legalize cannabis during the regular 2021 session. House Bill 2, along with a separate bill dealing with expungements (Senate Bill 2), legalized cannabis with the following conditions:

- Possession of cannabis for adults 21 and over will become legal on June 29, 2021. No possession limit will apply at home while a two-ounce (57 g) limit will apply outside the home.
- Personal cultivation of six mature plants and six immature plants will be allowed per person, with a limit of 12 mature plants per residence.
- Retail sales of cannabis will begin by April 1, 2022. A 12% excise tax will apply in addition to regular sales taxes. The excise tax will increase 1% each year beginning in 2025, until reaching 18% in 2030.
- There will be no limit on the number of retail licenses issued by the state. Local governments will be allowed to limit the number of dispensaries or restrict where they are located, but will not be allowed to ban them entirely.
- Public consumption will remain illegal, but businesses will be allowed to offer on-site consumption if certain requirements are met.
- Any arrests or convictions for acts made legal by the bill will automatically be expunged.

In compliance with the deadline imposed by the Cannabis Regulation Act, the first licensed sales of recreational cannabis began on April 1, 2022. Governor Lujan Grisham visited a dispensary in Albuquerque to mark the occasion.

== County and municipal policy ==
=== Santa Fe decriminalization (2014) ===
In August 2014, the Santa Fe City Council voted 5–4 to enact (rather than let go to ballot) a citizen-led petition to decriminalize small amounts of cannabis. The law allows police to issue a $25 civil citation for possession of up to one ounce (28 g), and requires that minor cannabis offenses be made the lowest police priority.

=== Bernalillo and Santa Fe county referendums (2014) ===
In November 2014, voters in Bernalillo and Santa Fe counties approved ballot measures expressing support for "county, city, and statewide efforts to decriminalize possession of one ounce [28 g] or less of marijuana". Initially the referendums were blocked from the ballot by Secretary of State Dianna Duran (who claimed that state law did not allow for non-binding questions), but the Supreme Court of New Mexico overruled her in September 2014. The measures passed with 60% and 73% support respectively.

=== Albuquerque decriminalization (2018) ===
In April 2018, the Albuquerque City Council voted 5–4 to allow police to issue a $25 civil citation for possessing up to one ounce (28 g) of cannabis. Previous efforts to decriminalize through a city council vote (in 2015) and a ballot measure vote (in 2014) were vetoed by the prior mayor Richard Berry.

=== Santa Fe legalization resolution (2018) ===
In December 2018, the Santa Fe City Council approved a resolution calling on state lawmakers to "enact legislation related to the legalization ... of cannabis and cannabis-related products for recreational use". The resolution was introduced by Mayor Alan Webber and passed by a 6–1 vote.

=== Las Cruces legalization resolution (2020) ===
In February 2020, the Las Cruces City Council approved a resolution urging the state legislature to pass the Cannabis Regulation Act to legalize recreational cannabis in New Mexico. The resolution passed 6–1 with Mayor Ken Miyagishima casting the only opposing vote.
