= Johnson Fire =

2021 wildfire in Gila National Forest, New Mexico, U.S.

- Part of the 2021 New Mexico wildfires
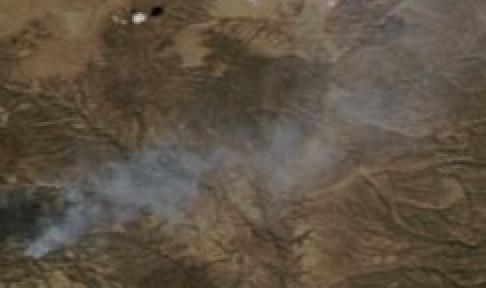
- Smoke from the Johnson Fire as seen from space
- Date: May 20, 2021 – July 23, 2021
- Location: Gila National Forest
- Coordinates: 33.238°N 108.473°W

Statistics
- Burned area: 88,918 acres (35,984 ha)

Ignition
- Cause: Lightning

Map
- Location in Southern New Mexico

The Johnson Fire was a wildfire that started in Gila National Forest near Gila Cliff Dwellings National Monument and the town of Silver City, New Mexico on May 20, 2021. The fire burned 88,918 acres (35,984 ha) and was fully contained on July 23, 2021. It was the largest wildfire in the United States of the 2021 wildfire season until June 6, 2021.

== Events ==
=== May ===
The Johnson Fire was first reported at around 12:00 am MDT on May 20, 2021.

=== Cause ===
The cause of the fire is believed to be due to a lightning strike.

=== Containment ===
On July 23, 2021, the Johnson Fire reached 100% containment.

== Impact ==
=== Closures and Evacuations ===
The Johnson Fire has led to the closure of multiple trails and roads in Gila National Forest, including Royal John Rd., Black Range Crest Trail, Grandview Trail and Trujillo Trail. It has also forced the closure of State Highway 152 between the mileposts 28 and 40.

The National Park Service closed the Gila Cliff Dwellings National Monument on June 5, 2021, and will remain closed until their order is rescinded.

== See also ==
- 2021 New Mexico wildfires
- List of New Mexico wildfires
