= New Mexico House Bill 356 =

New Mexico State House Bill

House Bill 356 titled "Cannabis Regulation Act" was a piece of legislation to legalize cannabis in New Mexico. It was advanced by the House Judiciary Committee for a vote by the full New Mexico House of Representatives on February 22, 2019. It was the first time a legalization bill had been advanced to the New Mexico Legislature for a vote. The bill passed in the House, 36–34, on March 7, 2019.

The corresponding bill in the New Mexico Senate was S.B. 577. A difference between the bills is that under the Senate legislation, cannabis would be sold in state-owned stores. On March 11, the Senate Public Affairs Committee referred the bill to the floor for a vote.

The bill died in the final days of the legislative session when the state Senate Finance Committee, chaired by John Arthur Smith refused to give the bill a hearing.
