= Three Rivers Fire =

Wildfire in New Mexico, United States

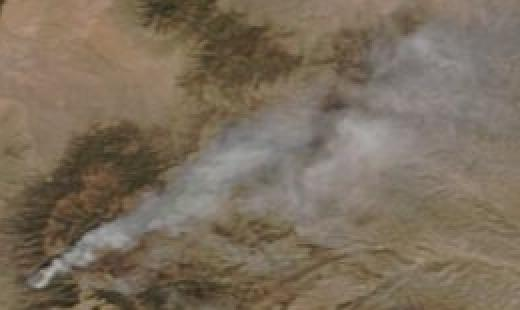
- Smoke from the Three Rivers Fire as seen from space
- Date: April 26, 2021 – June 21, 2021
- Location: Mescalero and Tularosa, Otero County, New Mexico
- Coordinates: 33.402°N 105.871°W

Statistics
- Burned area: 5,854 acres (2,369 ha)

Impacts
- Deaths: 0
- Structures lost: 0

Ignition
- Cause: Under investigation

Map
- Location within New Mexico

The Three Rivers Fire was a wildfire that started near the towns of Mescalero and Tularosa, New Mexico on April 26, 2021. The fire burned 5,854 acres (2,369 ha) in the Lincoln National Forest and was fully contained on June 21, 2021.

== Development ==
=== April ===
The Three Rivers Fire was first reported on April 26, 2021, at around 8am MST. It started near the Three Rivers Campground in the Lincoln National Forest.

=== Containment ===
On May 4, 2021, the fire was 23% contained.

On May 17, 2021, the fire was 78% contained.

On May 31, 2021, the fire was 98% contained.

== Impact ==
=== Closures and Evacuations ===
The Three Rivers Fire forced the closure of a number of roads, campgrounds, and hiking trails within the White Mountain Wilderness of the Lincoln National Forest, including the Three Rivers Campground itself. Evacuation notices were issued to several communities in the surrounding area.

== Aftermath ==
In early May, after performing a BAER assessment, forest service officials closed the area of the White Mountain Wilderness around the fire's burn scar to recreation due to the increased risk of flooding and mudslides. Some of the closed area was reopened to recreation in late June, including parts of the Crest Trail and Argentina Canyon Trail. However, the Three Rivers Campground remains closed as of July 2021, along with numerous other trails around the burn scar.

== See also ==
- 2021 New Mexico wildfires
