= New Mexico Wilderness Act of 1980 =

U.S. federal law

- Long title: An act to designate certain National Forest Service lands in the State of New Mexico for inclusion into the National Wildlife Preservation System, and for other purposes.
- Enacted by: the 96th United States Congress
- Effective: December 19, 1980

Citations
- Public law: 96-550

Legislative history
- Introduced in the House as H.R. 8298 by Manuel Lujan, Jr. (R–NM) on October 2, 1980; Committee consideration by United States House Committee on Agriculture; Passed the House on November 21, 1980; Passed the Senate on December 1, 1980; Signed into law by President Jimmy Carter on December 19, 1980

New Mexico Wilderness Act of 1980, Public Law 96-550, is a U.S. federal law that authorized the establishment of a number of designated Wilderness Areas on National Forest land in New Mexico. The law also added additional lands to four existing Wilderness Areas in New Mexico, and named several Forest areas for study as potential Wilderness Areas. The law also created two new National Park Service units, Chaco Culture National Historical Park and Salinas National Monument, from existing NPS lands. By means of this law approximately 400,000 acres of forest land were designated as Wilderness Areas, as described by the Wilderness Act of 1964, and approximately 75,000 additional acres were designated as Wilderness Study Areas for possible future inclusion in the Wilderness program.

== Background ==
Responding to a heightened public interest in conservation and an increased threat to public lands by development, and other intrusive or consumptive activities, such as logging, Congress passed the Wilderness Act of 1964, Public Law 88-577 (16 U.S.C. 1131-1136) on September 3, 1964. Created, in the words of the law, "to secure for the American people of present and future generations the benefits of an enduring resource of wilderness," the law created the National Wilderness Preservation System and a set of criteria and administrative processes by which natural areas could be added to this system.

Under this new law, proposed areas on U.S. Forest Service, National Park Service, and U.S. Fish and Wildlife Service could be designated as Wilderness Areas, special reserves protected from human encroachment and development. Within these areas, unless specially exempted, Congress mandated that there "shall be no commercial enterprise and no permanent road within any wilderness area designated by this Act and, except as necessary to meet minimum requirements for the administration of the area...there shall be no temporary road, no use of motor vehicles, motorized equipment or motorboats, no landing of aircraft, no other form of mechanical transport, and no structure or installation within any such area." To be kept in as close to a pristine natural state as possible, these areas would only be open to hikers and backpackers, who would be expected to follow low-impact, "pack-in/pack out" camping practices.

== Legislative history ==
What would eventually become Public Law 96-550 was first proposed to the House of Representatives by Manuel Lujan Jr., the representative of New Mexico's 1st Congressional District on October 2, 1980. Designated House Resolution 8298 (96th) the bill was discussed in both the House Agriculture and Natural Resources Committees before being approved on November 21, 1980, six weeks after its introduction. After passing through the Senate Energy and Natural Resources Committee, the bill was passed in identical form to the House version on December 1, 1980. Eighteen days later, on December 19, 1980, the bill, now known as the New Mexico Wilderness Act of 1980, was signed by the President.

== Title I ==
Title 1, Section 102 of the new law authorized the establishment of nine new Wilderness Areas and the addition of lands to three existing Wilderness Areas on National Forest land in New Mexico.

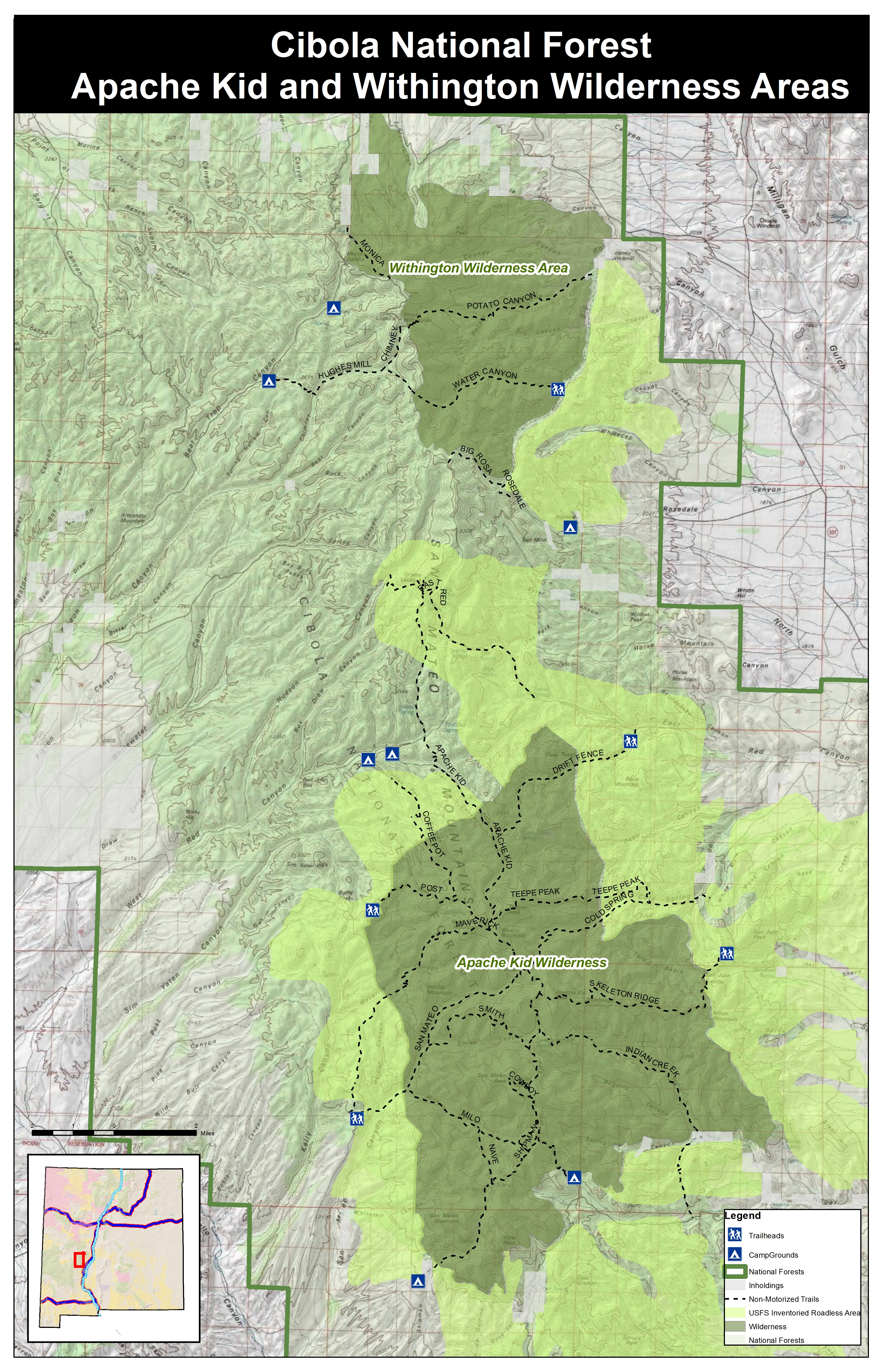
Map of the Apache Kid and Withington Wilderness Areas, Cibola National Forest

The Wilderness Areas established included:

- The 211,300 acre Aldo Leopold Wilderness in the Gila National Forest
- The 45,000 acre Apache Kid Wilderness in the Cibola National Forest
- The 30,000 acre Blue Range Wilderness in the Gila National Forest
- The 34,000 acre Capitan Mountains Wilderness in the Lincoln National Forest
- The 5,200 acre Dome Wilderness in the Santa Fe National Forest
- The 20,000 acre Latir Peak Wilderness in the Carson National Forest
- The 19,000 acre Withington Wilderness in the Cibola National Forest
- The 18,000 acre Cruces Basin Wilderness in the Carson National Forest

Additional lands were added to the following existing Wilderness Areas, including:

- 140,000 acres added to the Gila Wilderness in the Gila National Forest
- 14,700 acres added to the Wheeler Peak Wilderness in the Carson National Forest
- 16,806 acres added to the White Mountain Wilderness in the Lincoln National Forest
- 55,000 acres added to the Pecos Wilderness in the Carson and Santa Fe National Forests

Title I, Section 103 of the law instructed the Secretary of Agriculture, as the official responsible for the Forest Service and the implementation of the Wilderness Act of 1964 to examine five proposed Wilderness Study Areas to determine their suitability for inclusion in the National Wilderness Preservation system. The law further stated that the Secretary's findings should be presented to the Senate and the President no later than January 1, 1986.

The areas proposed for study included:

- The 15,110 acre Bunk Robinson Wilderness Study Area in the Coronado National Forest
- The 16,000 acre Columbine-Hondo Wilderness Study Area in the Carson National Forest
- The 18,860 acre Hell Hole Wilderness Study Area in the Gila National Forest
- The 8,800 acre Lower San Francisco Wilderness Study Area in the Gila National Forest
- The 7,760 acre Whitmire Canyon Wilderness Study Area in the Coronado National Forest

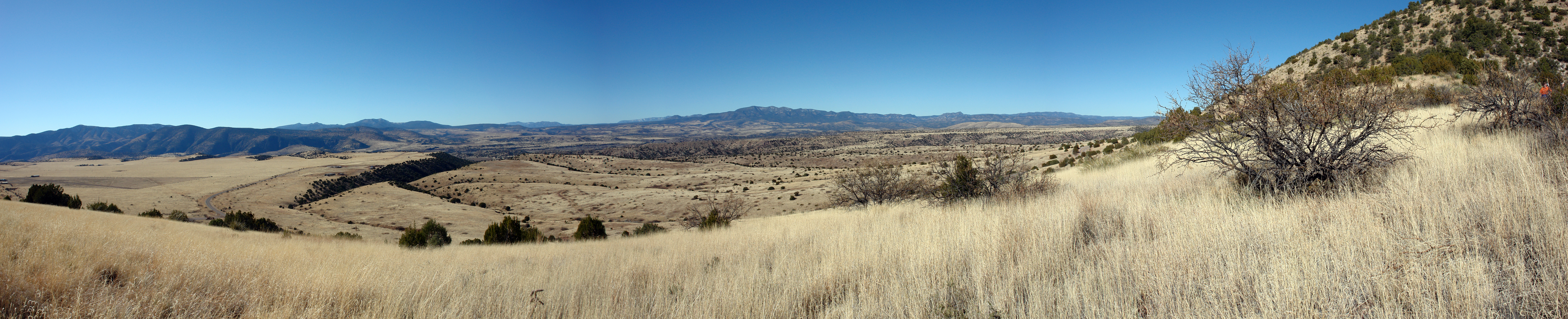
Panoramic view of the Gila Wilderness, Gila National Forest

== Title II ==
Title II of the law authorized the Secretary of Agriculture to create, in conjunction with the New Mexico Institute of Mining and Technology, the Langmuir Research Site in the Cibola National Forest. Noting that the "high altitude and freedom from air pollution and night luminosity caused by human activity" made the Forest "uniquely suited to the conduct of research probes into thunder clouds and for other atmospheric and astronomical research purposes," the law authorized the use of 31,000 acres of the Cibola National Forest for research use.

== Titles III and IV ==
These two short sections of the law authorized the payment of not more than $20,000 to reimburse Albert and Eulalaia Rodriquez for improvements on land within the Taos Pueblo Grant, and gave the Secretary of the Interior the authority to amend the contract between the Vermejo Conservancy District, a Bureau of Reclamation irrigation project near Maxwell, New Mexico and the federal government.

== Title V ==
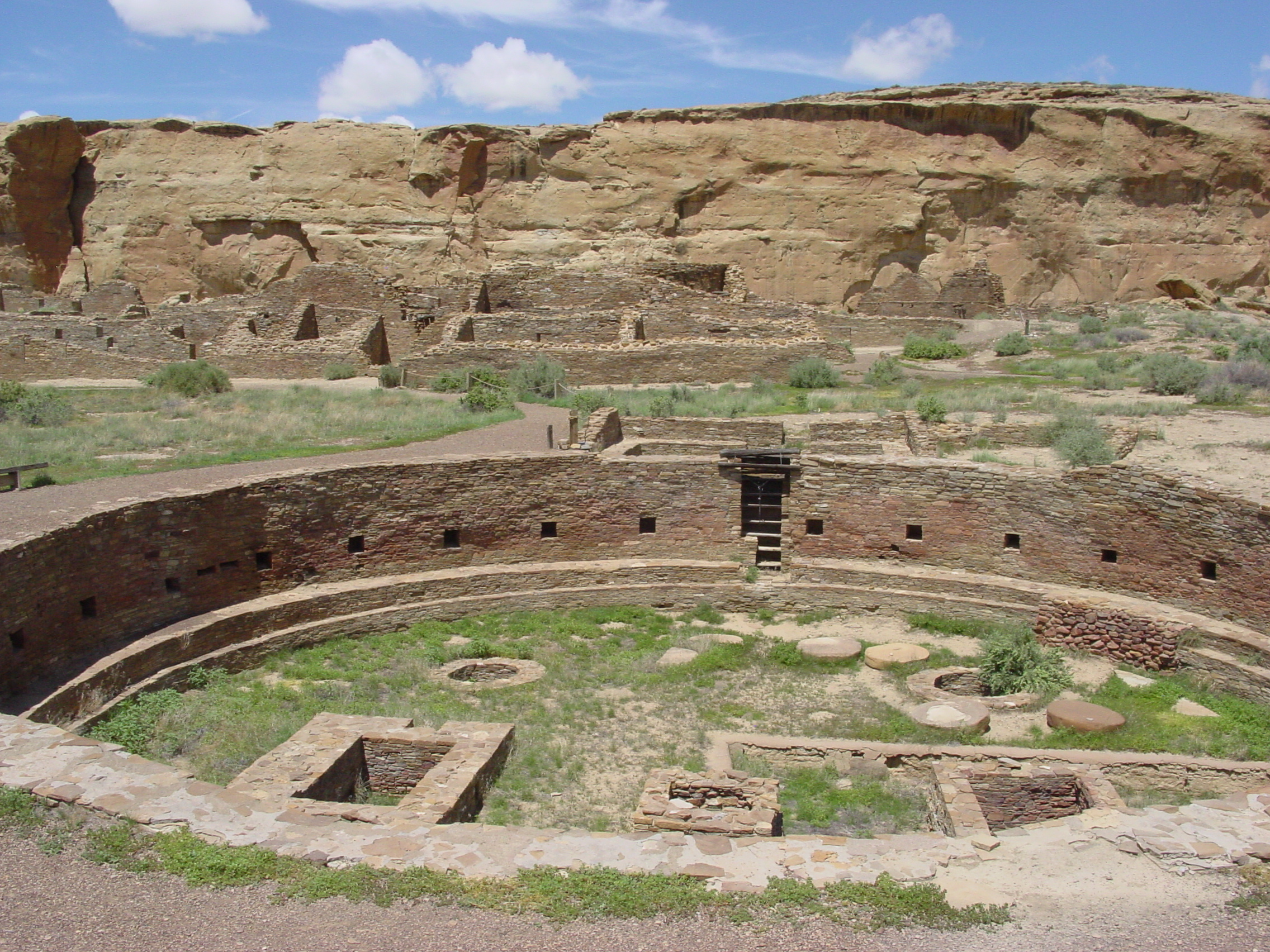
The Great Kiva, Chaco Culture N.H.P.

Title V of the law authorized the re-designation of the Chaco Canyon National Monument to Chaco Culture National Historical Park. Established in 1933, Chaco Canyon National Monument was created to preserve the very large collection of Ancestral Puebloan dwellings, kivas, and primitive roads located in and around Chaco Canyon in northwestern New Mexico. In 1980, recognizing the importance of the archaeological research being done in and around Chaco Canyon and the increased public interest in the Ancient Puebloan people Congress authorized the Secretary of Agriculture to designate 31 outlying areas Chaco Culture Archaeological Protection Sites. Meant to protect these potentially valuable sites from encroachment from energy-related exploration and development, the law authorized the Secretary of Interior, as the official responsible for the National Park Service, to enter into co-operative agreements with land holders to protect, preserve, maintain, and administer these sites, or if under imminent threat of damage or destruction, to seek title to these lands by donation, purchase with donated or appropriated funds, or exchange.

== Title VI ==
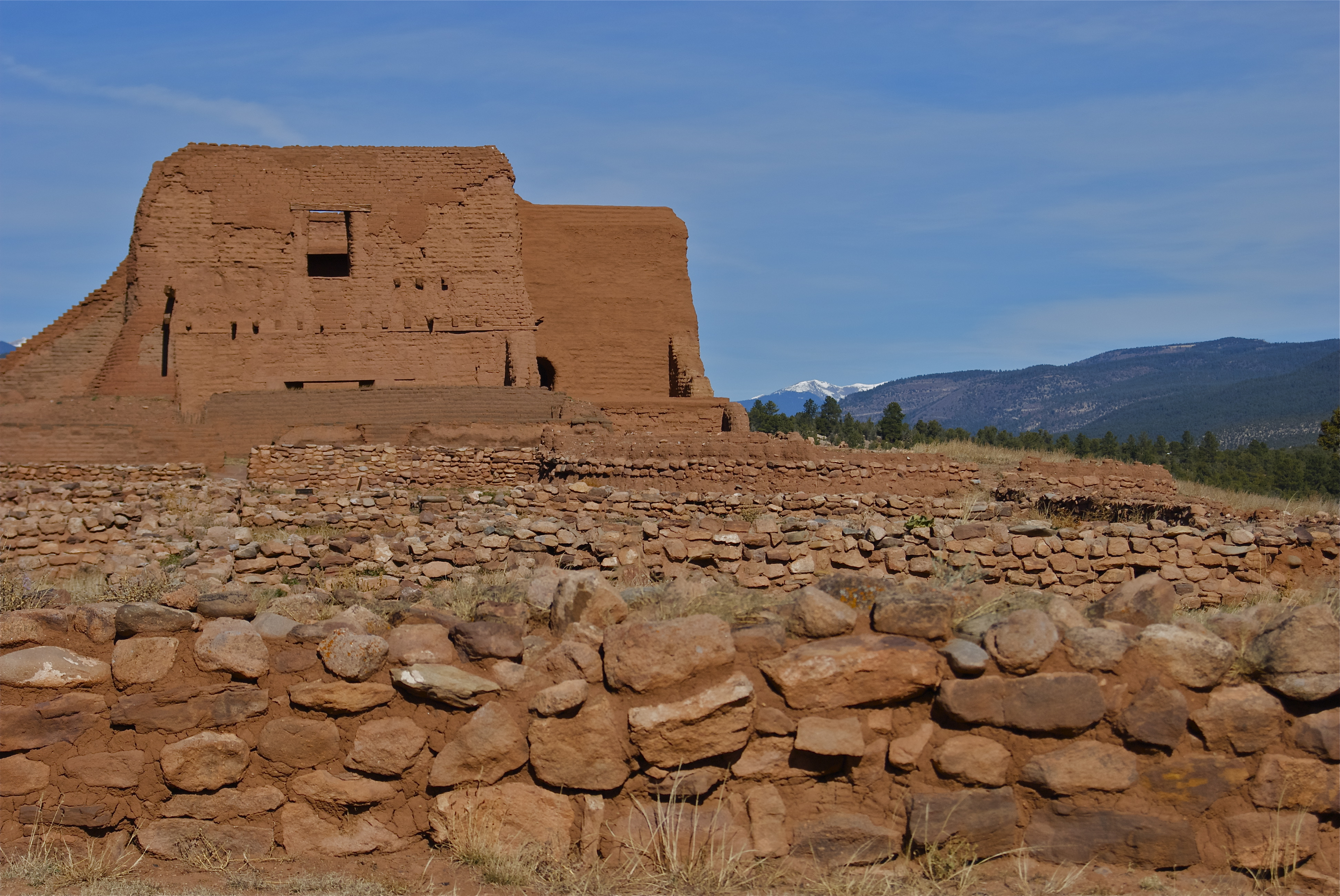
Ruins at Gran Quivira, Salinas Pueblo Missions National Monument

The last section of the law authorized the establishment of Salinas Pueblo Missions National Monument near Mountainair, New Mexico. To create this new unit, the law abolished the nearby Gran Quivira National Monument, assigned its 611 acres to the new park, authorized the Secretary of the Interior to acquire an additional 466 acres near Mountainair, and gave permission for the Secretary to acquire other lands as might be need to complete the unit. Protecting both the ancient Native American ruins and the Missions built in the area by the Spanish, the new park combined the ruins at Gran Quivira, Abo, and Quaraiin into a single administrative unit, with its headquarters in Mountainair.

== See also ==
- Wilderness Act of 1964
