= White Wilderness =

White Wilderness may refer to:

- Puszcza Biała, the White Wilderness in Poland
- White Wilderness (film), a 1958 Disney documentary noted for its propagation of the myth of lemming suicide
- White Mountain Wilderness, a protected wilderness area within the Lincoln National Forest
