= Alamo National Forest =

Former national forest in New Mexico

Coordinates: 32°48′03″N 105°36′47″W

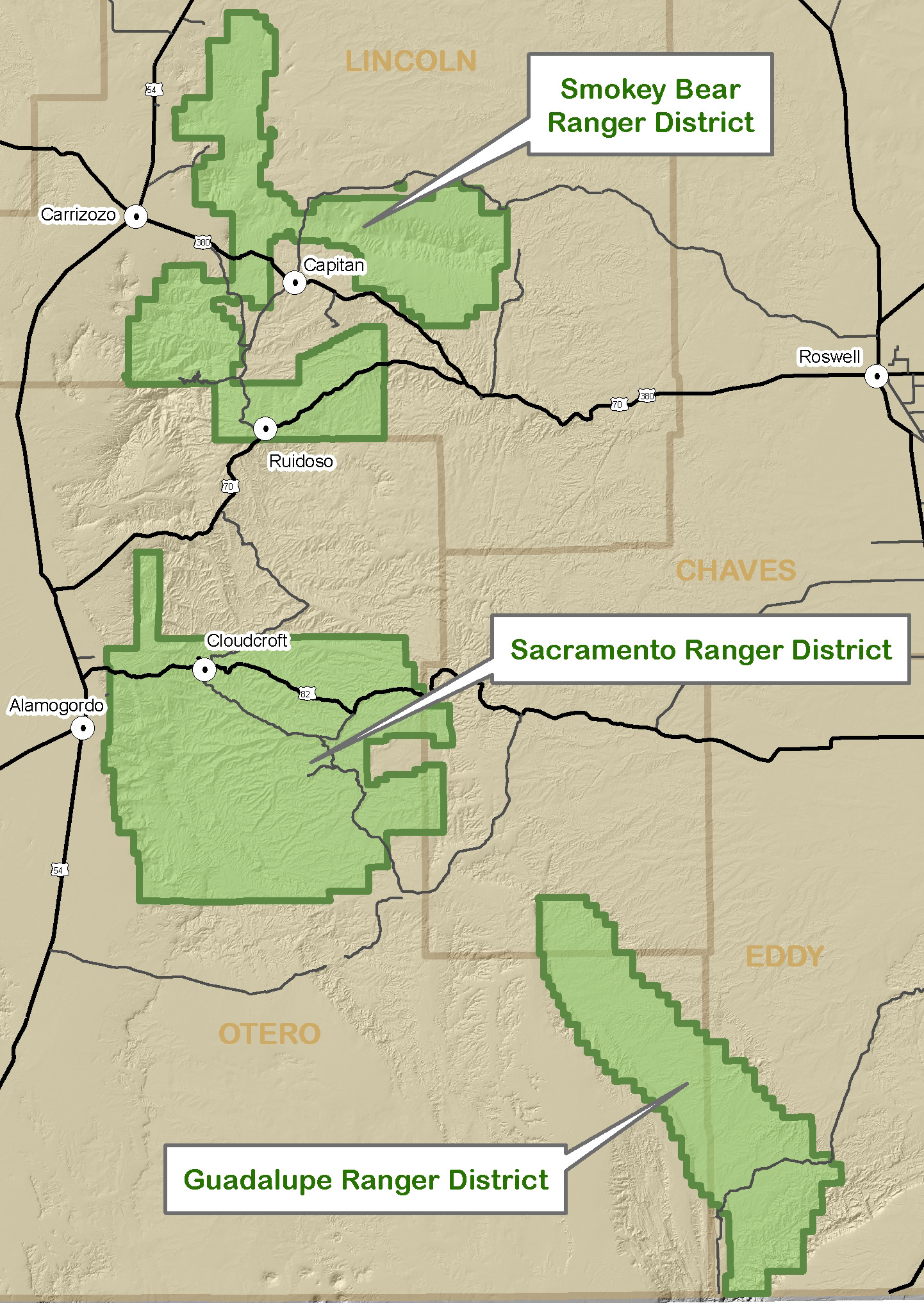
Map of Lincoln National Forest

Alamo National Forest is a disestablished National Forest in southern New Mexico. The forest was established on July 2, 1908, by an executive order (908) signed by President Theodore Roosevelt that consolidated two existing U.S. Forest Service units, the Guadalupe National Forest, established on April 19, 1907, to protect a part of the Guadalupe Mountains north of the Texas border, and the Sacramento National Forest, established on April 24, 1907, to preserve the heavily forested Sacramento Mountains east of Alamogordo. The new forest encompassed approximately 800,000 acres of public land and was divided into a number of Ranger districts, including the Carson Seep district in the former Guadalupe forest and the Fresnal, La Luz, Mayhill and Weed districts in the former Sacramento forest. The forest boundaries were enlarged on March 2, 1909, by presidential proclamation when Roosevelt removed timber-rich land from the adjacent Mescalero Apache Reservation and added them to the forest. These lands were returned to the Mescalero Apache three years later on March 1, 1912, by an executive order (1481) signed by President William Howard Taft, who noted his desire to "restore the Mescalero Apache Indian Reservation in all respects to the status existing prior to the said proclamation of March 2, 1909, as though the inclusion of the lands within the Alamo National Forest had not been ordered." The final change of boundaries came on April 3, 1916, when President Woodrow Wilson issued a proclamation both adding to and eliminating lands from the forest area. A little over a year later the Alamo National Forest was disestablished by Executive Order (2633) and the forest's lands transferred to the nearby Lincoln National Forest, a former Forest Reserve first established in 1902 to protect lands around Capitan and Lincoln. Under this new administration the Carson Seep Ranger District was renamed the Guadalupe Ranger District, and the Fresnal district was renamed the Cloudcroft district. The Mayhill and Weed districts retained their names until 1961 when the Cloudcroft, Mayhill, and Weed districts were consolidated into the current Sacramento Ranger District.

== See also ==
- Guadalupe National Forest
- Sacramento National Forest
- Lincoln National Forest
