= Gallinas National Forest =

New Mexico

Gallinas National Forest was established as the Gallinas Forest Reserve by the U.S. Forest Service on November 5, 1906 to protect 78,480 acres (317.6 km^{2}) of land in the Gallinas Mountains NW of Corona, New Mexico. The area became a National Forest on March 4, 1907. On July 2, 1908 the area was transferred to Lincoln National Forest, a forest area SE of Corona. In 1958 the Gallinas forest area was transferred to the Cibola National Forest, where it became a part of the Mountainair Ranger District, headquartered in Mountainair, New Mexico.
