= Sacramento National Forest =

Former national forest in New Mexico

Coordinates: 32°50′00″N 105°40′00″W

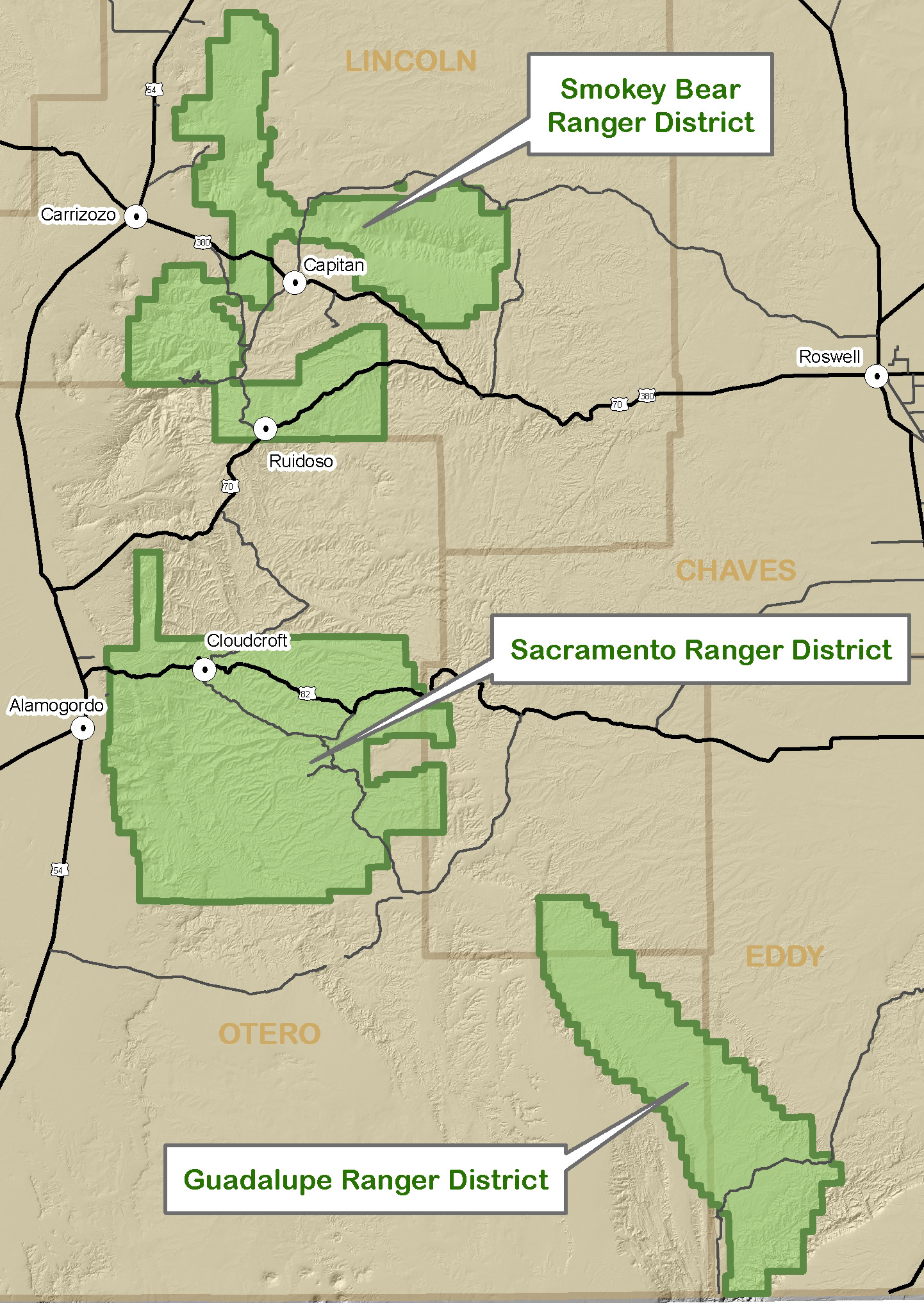
Map of Lincoln National Forest

Sacramento National Forest is a former National Forest in southern New Mexico. The Forest was established by Presidential proclamation on April 24, 1907 to preserve the timber-rich lands in the southern Sacramento Mountains around Cloudcroft and Mayhill. Led by inaugural Forest Supervisor C. H. Hinderer, the forest was headquartered in Alamogordo. Fourteen months later, on July 2, 1908, President Roosevelt issued Executive Order 908. which consolidated the Sacramento with the nearby Guadalupe National Forest to create the Alamo National Forest. Arthur M. Neal, the last supervisor of the independent Guadalupe forest became the initial supervisor for the new Alamo National Forest, with his headquarters in Alamogordo. Under this new administrative scheme the former Sacramento National Forest was divided into a number of individual Ranger Districts within the Alamo National Forest, including Fresnal, La Luz, Mayhill, and Weed. On June 6, 1917, President Woodrow Wilson issued Executive Order 2633, which disestablished the Alamo National Forest and transferred all of its lands to the nearby Lincoln National Forest. As a result of this order, some areas of the former Sacramento National Forest, like La Luz Ranger District, lost their independent status, others were renamed, such as the Fresnal district, which became the Cloudcroft Ranger District, and others, like Mayhill and Weed, retained their original names and designations. In 1961, the Cloudcroft, Mayhill and Weed Ranger Districts were consolidated and given their current designation, the Sacramento Ranger District of the Lincoln National Forest.

== See also ==
- Alamo National Forest
- Guadalupe National Forest
- Lincoln National Forest
