= Guadalupe National Forest =

Protected area in New Mexico, US

Coordinates: 32°18′00″N 104°51′00″W

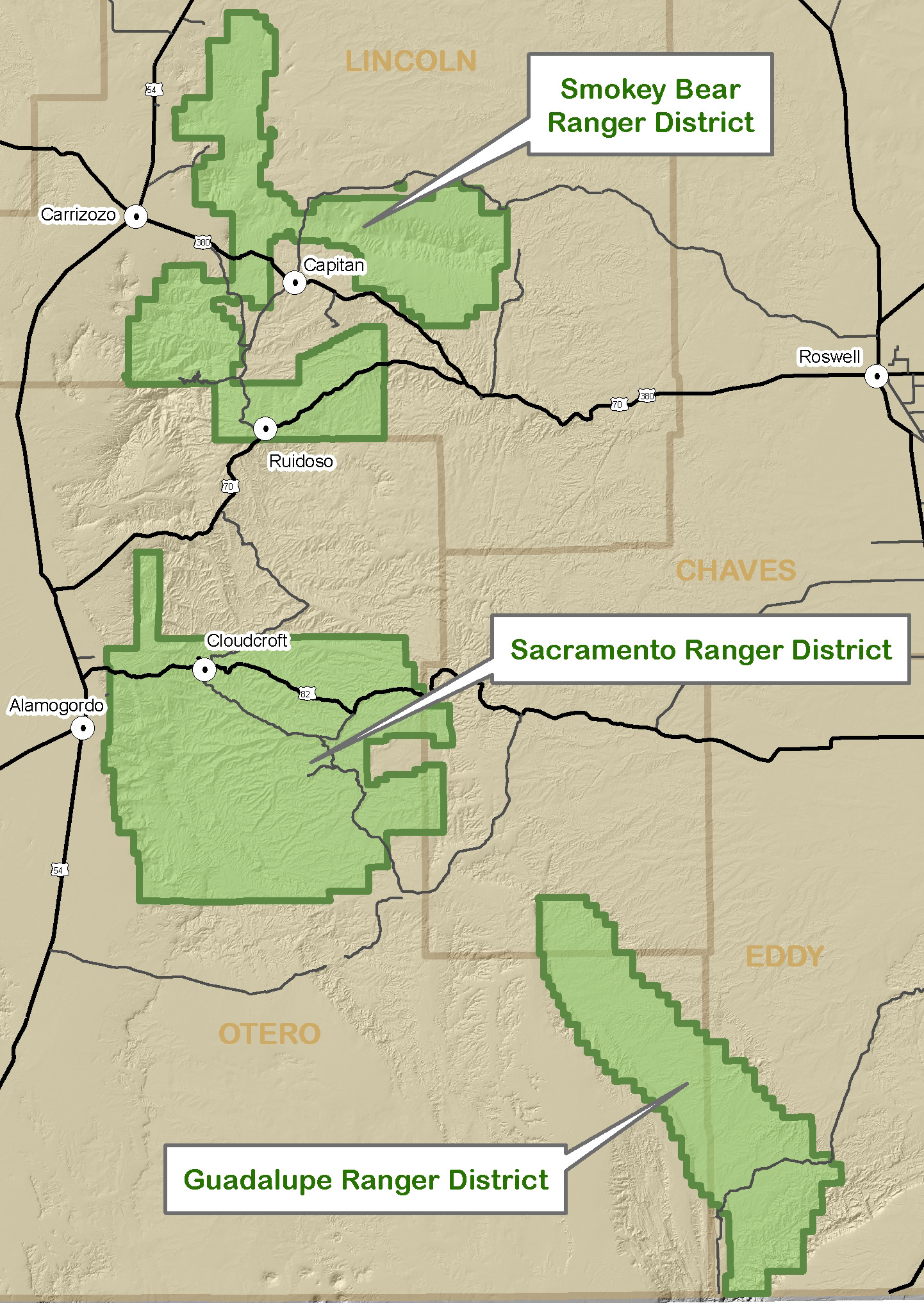
Map of Lincoln National Forest

Guadalupe National Forest is a former National Forest in southern New Mexico. The Forest was originally established on April 19, 1907 by a Proclamation issued by President Theodore Roosevelt. Led by inaugural Supervisor J. H. Kinney, the forest was initially based in Carlsbad, New Mexico, but within a year the headquarters was moved to Alamogordo. Soon after, on July 2, 1908, President Roosevelt issued Executive Order 908. which consolidated the Guadalupe with the nearby Sacramento National Forest to create the Alamo National Forest. Arthur M. Neal, the last supervisor of the independent Guadalupe forest became the initial supervisor for the new Alamo National Forest, with his headquarters in Alamogordo. Under this new administrative scheme the former Guadalupe National Forest was renamed the Carson Seep Ranger District of the Alamo National Forest. On June 6, 1917, President Woodrow Wilson issued Executive Order 2633, which disestablished the Alamo National Forest and transferred all of its lands to the Lincoln National Forest. As a result of this order, the Carson Seep Ranger District was renamed to its current designation, the Guadalupe Ranger District of the Lincoln National Forest, with its headquarters in Carlsbad.

== See also ==
- Alamo National Forest
- Sacramento National Forest
- Lincoln National Forest
