= Lincoln National Forest =

National forest in New Mexico, United States

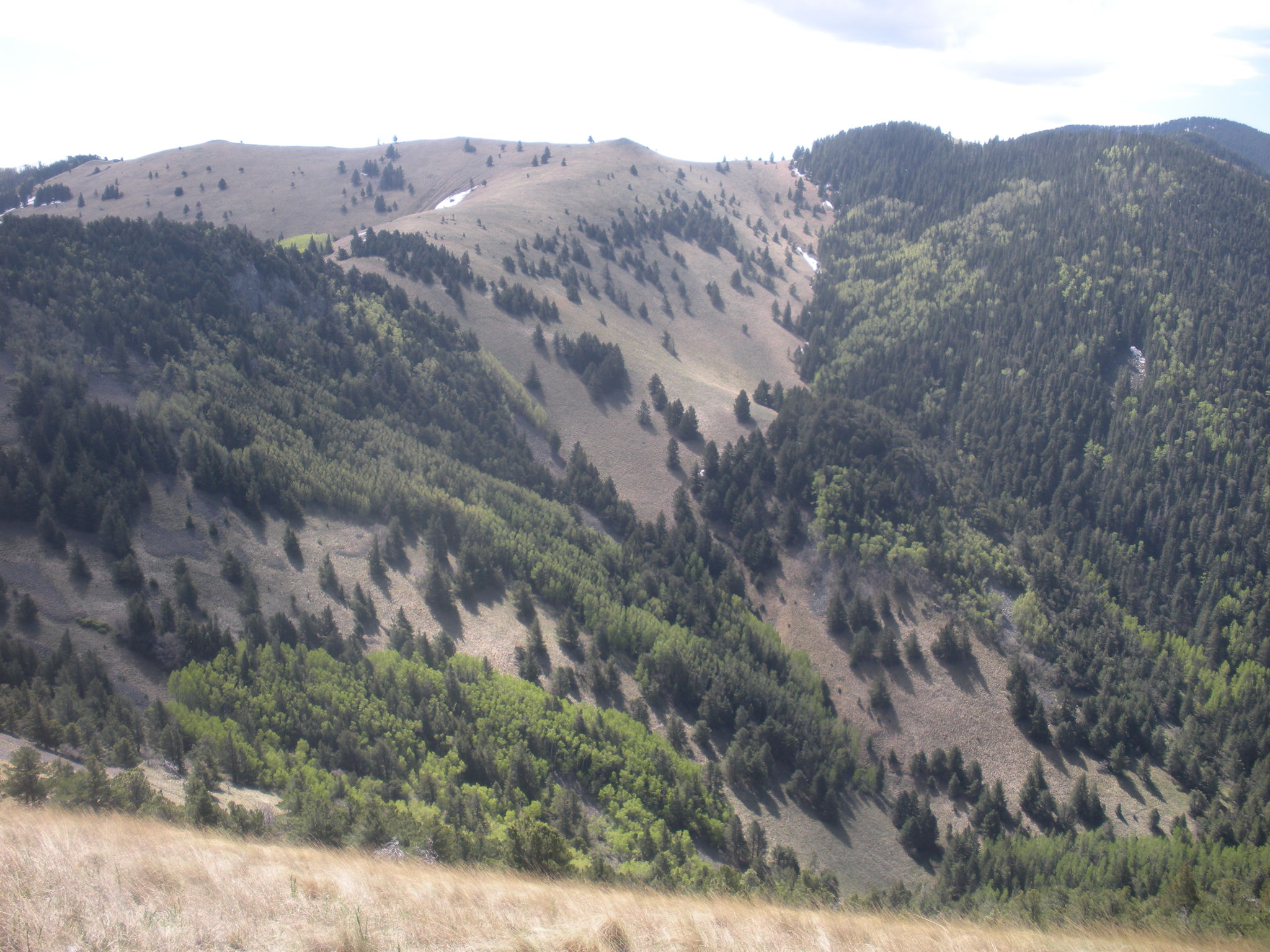
- Lincoln National Forest - view from Crest Trail

- Location within New Mexico Location within the United States
- Location: New Mexico, United States
- Nearest city: Alamogordo, NM
- Coordinates: 32°50′02″N 105°41′49″W
- Area: 1,103,897 acres (4,467.31 km^{2})
- Established: July 26, 1902; 123 years ago
- Governing body: U.S. Forest Service
- Website: Lincoln National Forest

Lincoln National Forest is a unit of the U.S. Forest Service located in southern New Mexico. The Lincoln National Forest covers an extensive 1.1 million acres in southeastern New Mexico. Established by Presidential Proclamation in 1902 as the Lincoln Forest Reserve, the 1,103,897 acres (4,467.31 km^{2}) forest begins near the Texas border and contains lands in parts of Chaves, Eddy, Lincoln, and Otero counties. The Lincoln National Forest is home to three major mountain ranges: Sacramento, Guadalupe and Capitan. The three Ranger Districts within the forest contain all or part of a total of four mountain ranges, and include a variety of different environmental areas, from desert to heavily forested mountains and sub-alpine grasslands. Clean air, water, and soil are necessary elements that the National Forests contribute to the environment. Established to balance conservation, resource management, and recreation, the lands of the Lincoln National Forest include important local timber resources, protected wilderness areas, and popular recreation and winter sports areas. The forest headquarters is located in Alamogordo, N.M. with local offices in Carlsbad, Cloudcroft, and Ruidoso.

== History ==
The land was inhabited in pre-Columbian times by the Niit'a-héõde band of the Mescalero Apache. The modern Lincoln National Forest traces its origins to several different forest reserves and national forests designated in the 1902–1908 period. These included the Lincoln Forest Reserve, a 545,256-acre area established July 26, 1902, around Capitan and Lincoln, the 78,480 acre Gallinas Forest Reserve established on November 5, 1906, in the Gallinas Mountains west of Gallinas, the Guadalupe National Forest, established April 19, 1907 in the mountains along the Texas border, and the Sacramento National Forest, created on April 24, 1907, to reserve the forested heights of the Sacramento Mountains near Alamogordo. Scattered throughout south-central New Mexico, these individual units contained lands in the Guadalupe, Sacramento, Sierra Blanca/White Mountains, Capitan and Gallinas ranges, and encompassed environments from the desert shrubs at the floor of the Chihuahuan Desert through forests of Piñon, Pine and Juniper to sub-alpine grasslands above the tree-line.

The process of integrating these individual units into a single, unified National Forest began in July 1908, when President Theodore Roosevelt signed Executive Order 908, which combined a number of national forests in the Southwestern states into larger units. The first forester was Arthur Ringland who later founded the international relief organization, CARE. One element of this order was to add the Gallinas National Forest, a tract of land around the Gallinas Mountains west of Corona, New Mexico to the existing Lincoln National Forest. Another element of Roosevelt's Executive Order that would have a great impact on the development of the Lincoln National Forest was the decision to combine the existing Guadalupe and Sacramento National Forests into the Alamo National Forest. A wholly new administrative unit, the Alamo National Forest was headquartered in Alamogordo and led by inaugural Forest Supervisor Arthur M. Neal.

Nearly nine years later, on June 6, 1917, President Woodrow Wilson signed an Executive order that transferred the lands of the Alamo National Forest to the control of the Lincoln National Forest. As a result of this order, the main elements of the Alamo National Forest, the public lands around the Sacramento and Guadalupe Mountains, were transferred to the Lincoln, greatly expanding its size. The last major change in the Forest's boundaries came in 1945, when administrative control of the former Gallinas National Forest was transferred from the Lincoln to the sprawling Cibola National Forest. Officially transferred in 1958. the Gallinas area was renamed the Mountainair Ranger District, with its headquarters in Mountainair.

== The forest ==
The modern Lincoln National Forest is composed of three separate units, the Smokey Bear Ranger District, headquartered in Ruidoso, the Sacramento Ranger District, headquartered in Cloudcroft, and the Guadalupe Ranger District, with its headquarters in Carlsbad.

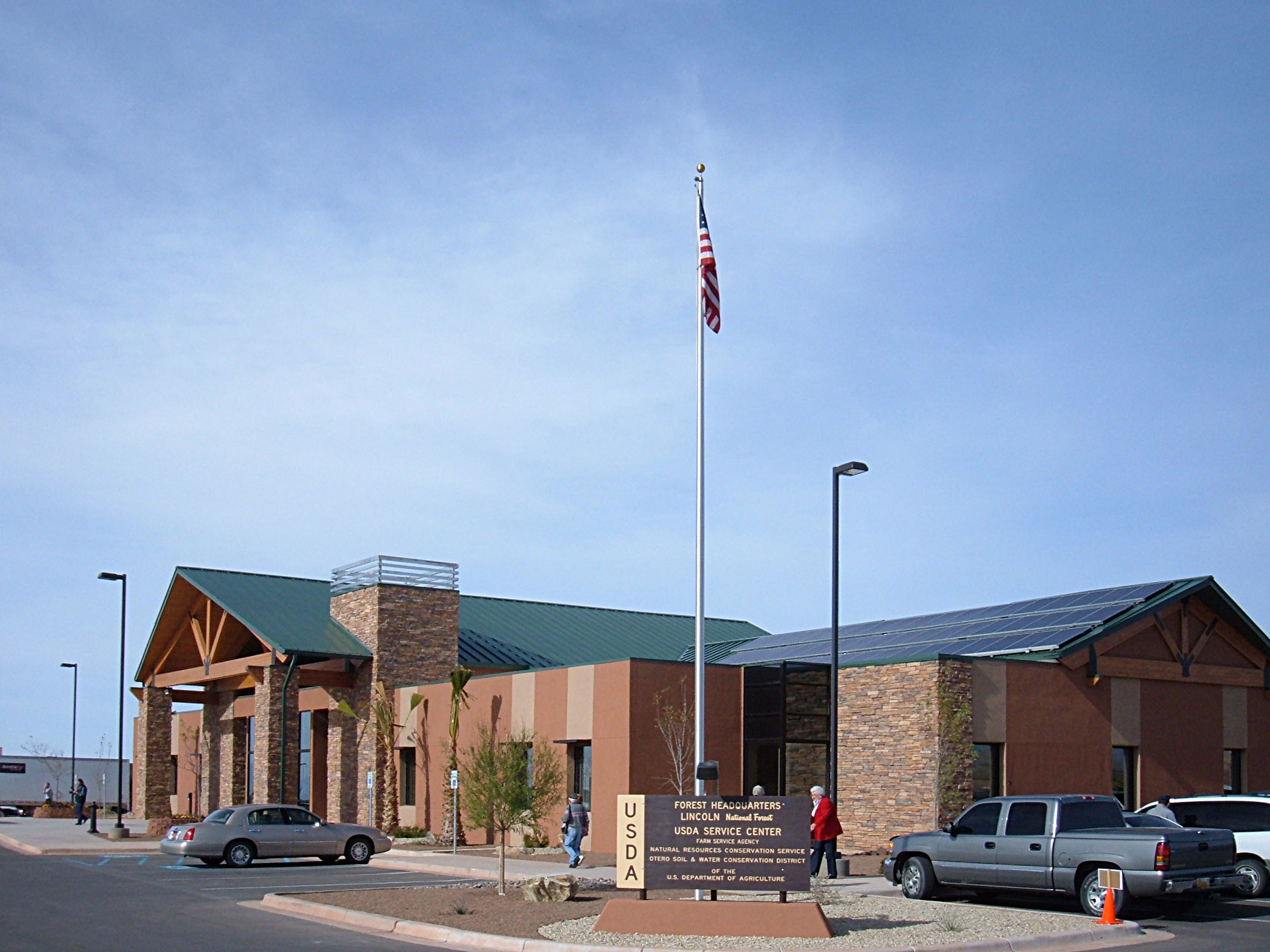
Forest Headquarters, Alamogordo, N.M.

=== Sacramento Ranger District ===
Originally established April 24, 1907 as the Sacramento National Forest, the heavily forested southern Sacramento Mountains, east of Alamogordo, were combined with the Guadalupe National Forest to form the Alamo National Forest in July 1908. One of the two major elements of the new forest, the former Sacramento National Forest was divided into a number of smaller ranger districts within the larger unit. These included the La Luz, Mayhill, and Weed Ranger Districts, all of which administered lands around their respective villages. On June 6, 1917, these lands became part of the Lincoln National Forest, when their parent organization, the Alamo National Forest was disestablished. As a result of this order, some areas of the former Sacramento National Forest, like La Luz Ranger District, lost their independent status, others were renamed, such as the Fresnal district, which became the Cloudcroft Ranger District, and others, like Mayhill and Weed, retained their original names and designations. In 1961, the Cloudcroft, Mayhill and Weed Ranger Districts were consolidated and given their current designation, the Sacramento Ranger District of the Lincoln National Forest.

Rising high above the gypsum sands of White Sands National Park and the city of Alamogordo, the Sacramento district encompasses much of the southern half of the Sacramento Mountains. Located immediately south of the Mescalero Apache Reservation, which covers the northern half of the mountains, the district is primarily composed of Douglas Fir, Ponderosa pine, aspen, and oak, as well as numerous creeks and waterfalls. The district is traversed east–west by that section of U.S. 82 between Artesia and Alamogordo, which goes through the villages of Cloudcroft and Mayhill. Other roads include New Mexico State Road 6563, also known as the Sunspot Scenic Byway, which runs between Cloudcroft and the village of Sunspot, and NM 244, which exits the district north of Cloudcroft and enters the Mescalero Apache Reservation.

==== Trestle ====
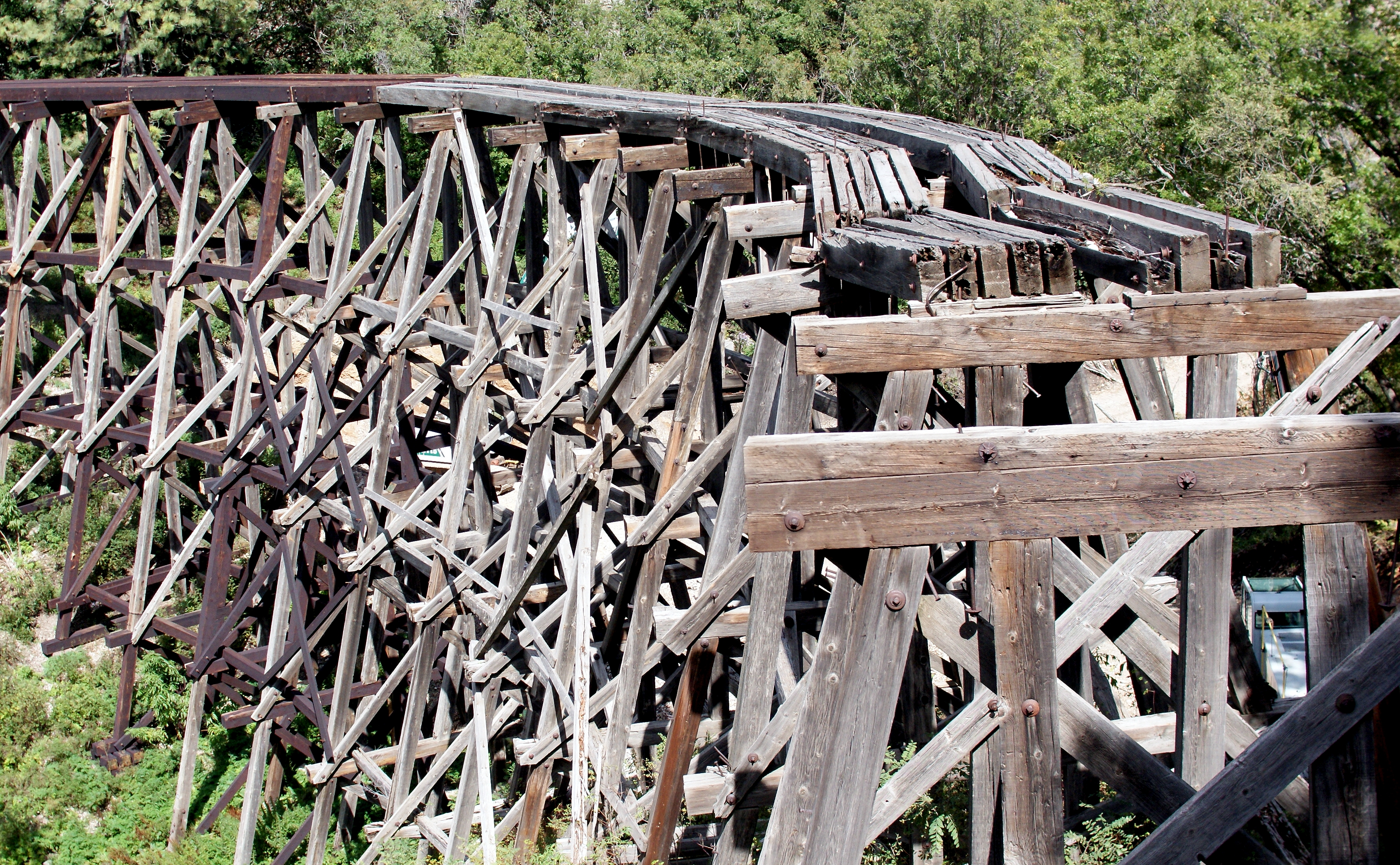
Wood railroad trestle across Mexican Canyon

A heavily forested area in an otherwise arid environment, the Sacramento Mountains have long been used for timber harvesting. To expedite the transport of timber to processing facilities and markets, the Alamogordo and Sacramento Mountain Railway was constructed in 1898 by the El Paso and Northeastern Railway, a short-line railroad that connected El Paso, Texas and Alamogordo. A genuine engineering marvel, the Alamogordo and Sacramento Mountain Railway climbed 4,747 feet over 32 miles of track, and included numerous switchbacks, trestles, and grades as high as 6.4%. Though the track was removed in 1948, evidence of the railroad is visible throughout the district. The most visible remnant of the railroad is the 320-foot trestle over Mexican Canyon near Cloudcroft. Crossing 52 feet above the canyon floor the trestle can be seen from vista points on U.S. 82 and by a number of short trails beginning at the Trestle Recreation Area, a day-use facility on the western edge of Cloudcroft.

==== Sunspot Observatory ====
The high mountains of the Sacramentos are also home to the National Solar Observatory's Richard B. Dunn Solar Telescope, considered the world's premier high resolution optical solar telescope at the time of its inauguration in 1969. Located in the southern end of the district, the observatory is open to the public on a seasonal basis and can be accessed by the scenic New Mexico State Road 6563, also known as the Sunspot Scenic Byway, a two-lane paved road that travels the 15.5 miles between Cloudcroft and the village of Sunspot.

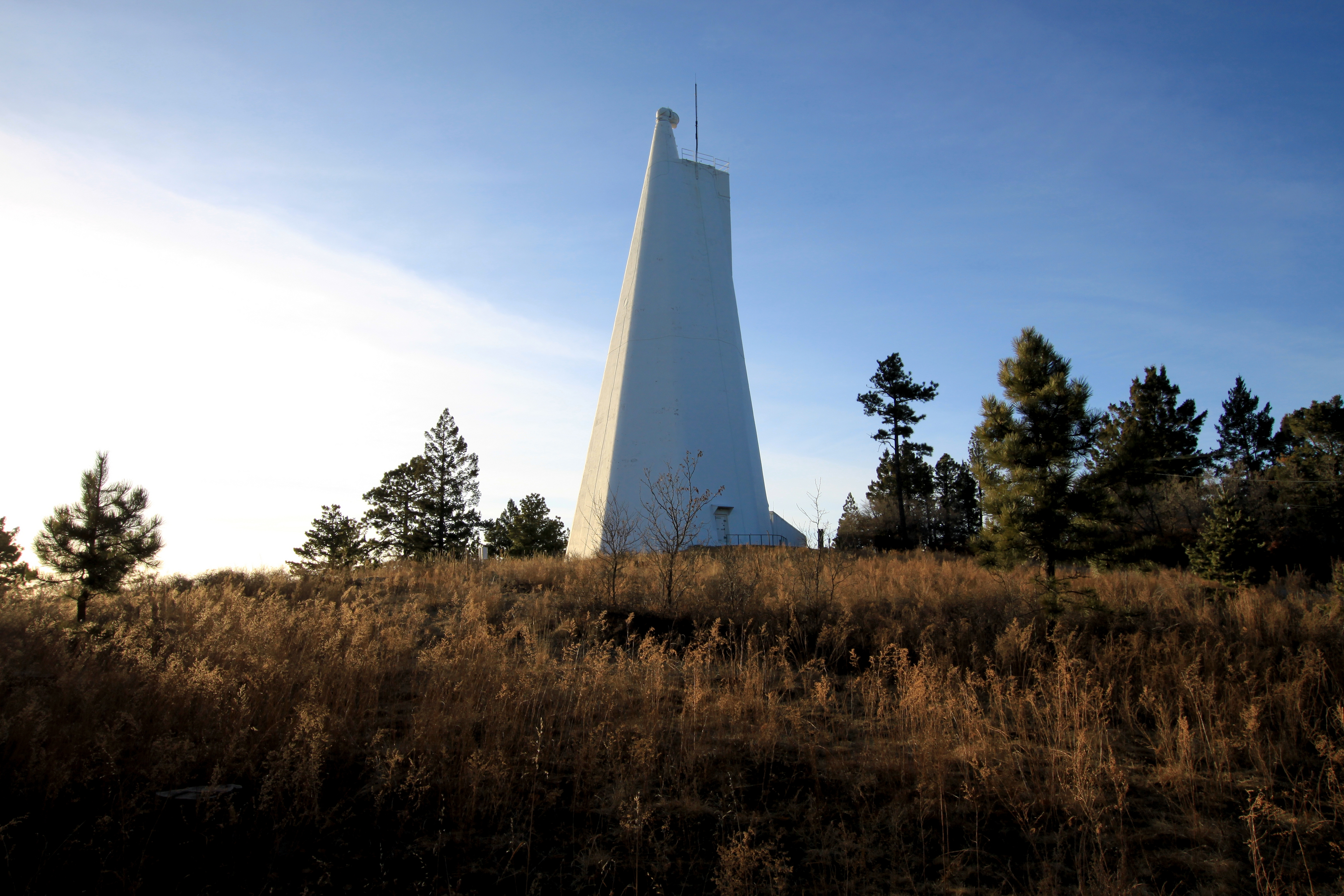
Richard B. Dunn Solar Telescope, Sunspot, N.M.

=== Smokey Bear District ===
Part of the original Forest Reserve established in 1902, the modern Smokey Bear Ranger District administers lands north of Capitan and Lincoln, in the Capitan Mountains, and south of Capitan to Ruidoso, immediately east of the Sierra Blanca or White Mountains. The area was initially divided into the Baca Ranch Ranger District, renamed the Capitan District in February 1919, along the Rio Bonito north of Lincoln, and the Mesa and Ruidoso Ranger Districts further south. The Mesa and Ruidoso districts were combined in October 1929 into the White Mountain Ranger District, a designation that lasted until 1952 when both areas resumed their original names. All of these areas were combined in 1960 and given their current designation, the Smokey Bear Ranger District.

423,416 acres in size, and ranging in elevation from 5,400 to 11,580 feet in the Capitan Mountains, the Smoky Bear district embraces a number of different environments, and includes desert shrubs, forests of pinyon pine, juniper, and spruce, and high-elevation grasslands above the treeline. The area also includes the Forest's two designated Wilderness Areas and one of the two ski areas, Ski Apache near Ruidoso. The district can be reached via U.S. 70, which traverses much of the southern part of the district and passes through the village of Ruidoso. Another highway, U.S. 380, crosses a thin stretch of public lands east of Carrizozo and crosses through Capitan and Lincoln.

==== Smokey Bear ====
The Lincoln National Forest is home to Smokey Bear, found in 1950. The real-life tale of Smokey Bear is one of the most enduring stories to come out of the long history of the forest. The bear cub was rescued from the devastated forest after the Capitan Gap fire of 1950. Rescued from a burnt tree by either a New Mexico Department of Game and Fish ranger or a group of soldiers from nearby Fort Bliss seconded to fight the blaze, the cub was flown to Santa Fe by New Mexico Ranger Ray Bell for treatment of burns and other injuries. The bear was eventually named Smokey Bear, after the Forest Service's symbol of fire safety on public lands, which had been created in 1944 by artist Harry Rossol. Now the living symbol of fire awareness and prevention, Smokey Bear was flown to the National Zoo in Washington D.C. The subject of hundreds of thousands of visitors and letters, the bear lived at the zoo until his death in 1976. Eulogized by the Washington Post as a transplanted New Mexico native with many years of government service, Smokey Bear was returned to his native land and buried near Capitan in November 1976.

==== Lincoln County War ====
Lincoln County, in which much of the district is located, was the site of the 1878–79 Lincoln County War, a complex and bloody struggle between ranchers, bankers, politicians, and hired gunmen for control of the county. One of the major events in the war took place in the village of Lincoln itself, when forces supporting Sheriff George W. Peppin besieged the house of merchant Alexander McSween over several days while soldiers from nearby Fort Stanton stood by. McSween was killed by gunfire, but a number of his supporters, known as "regulators," escaped, led from the burning building by a young tough named William Bonney, later known as the famous gunfighter Billy the Kid. The violence continued until early 1879, when Federal troops arrived to support local law enforcement in returning the area to the rule of law.

=== Guadalupe Ranger District ===
Part of a rugged and remote landscape of mountains and ridges, the 288,540 acre Guadalupe Ranger District begins at the Texas–New Mexico border and follows the spine of the Guadalupe Mountains northwest for nearly 50 miles. Originally established on April 19, 1907, as the Guadalupe National Forest, with its headquarters in Carlsbad, the area became part of the newly created Alamo National Forest in July 1908, as the Carson Seep Ranger District. When the Alamo was disestablished in June 1917, the Guadalupe area became part of the Lincoln National Forest, where it was re-designated the Guadalupe Ranger District.

The district is part of the Guadalupe Mountain range, an exposed area of the Capitan Reef, a Permian period (299 to 251 million years ago) barrier that partially encircled the Delaware Sea, a 150-mile-long and 75-mile-wide sea to the south and east. Running north-northwest from the more famous Guadalupe and El Capitan peaks on the Texas side of the border, the Guadalupe Ranger District forms the back reef of the northernmost section of the Capitan Reef. Ranging in elevation from 7500 ft in the south to 3500 ft in the north, the district begins at the Texas–New Mexico border in a series of steeply walled canyons before gradually changing into rolling hills and small canyons that run east into the valley of the Pecos River.

=== Lookout towers ===
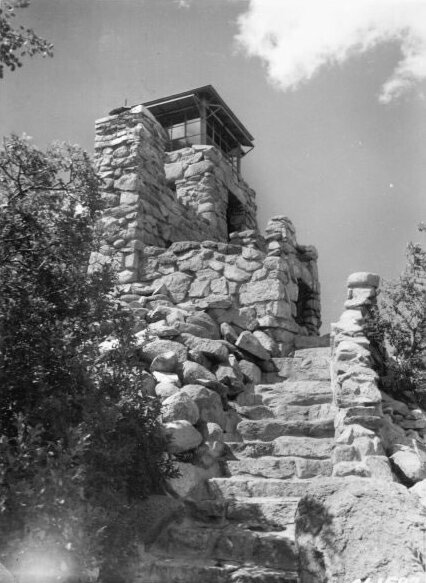
Monjeau Lookout tower

Given the importance of fire prevention and fire fighting in the heavily forested areas of the Lincoln National Forest it is not surprising that there have been a number of fire lookout towers constructed on forest lands. Of the sixteen fire lookout structures once in the forest, 9 are still extant, and six of those are listed on the National Register of Historic Places (NRHP). The structures range from the unique stone structure of the Montjeau Lookout, a 1930s Civilian Conservation Corps (CCC) project in the Smoky Bear Ranger District, to the Sacramento Lookout, a 14x14 live-in cab on a 62-foot high steel tower located west of Cloudcroft, to the 7x7 ft. Dark Canyon Lookout, standing 48 feet over the deep canyons of the southern Guadalupe District above its CCC-constructed observer's cabin and sheds. Most of these Lookouts offer some sort of public access, and two of them, Carissa and Wofford, are under consideration for conversion to rental cabins.

== Climate ==
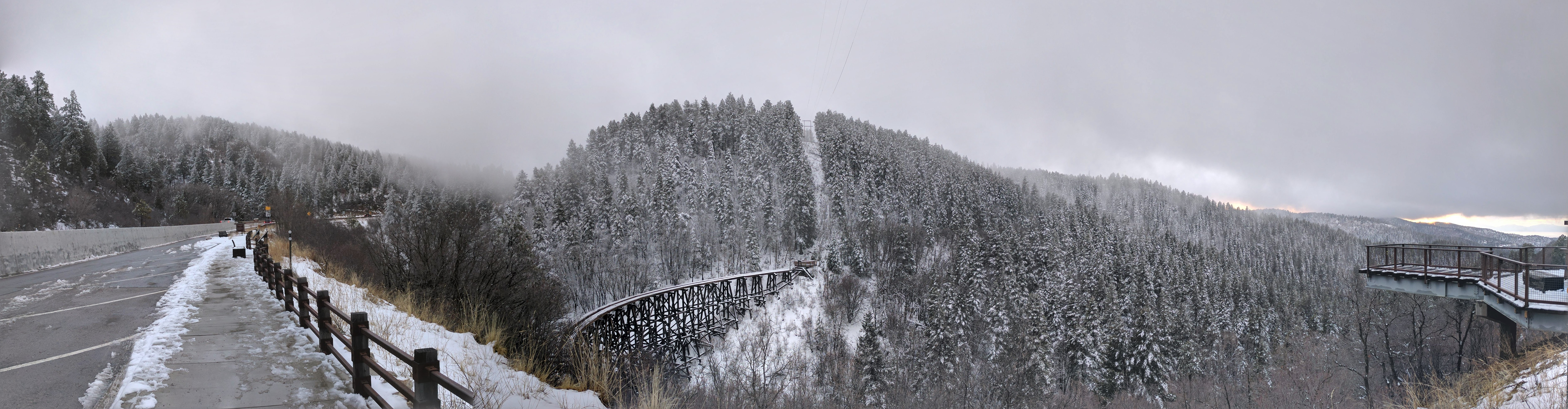
Mexican Canyon Trestle outside of Cloudcroft in the snow.

Since the forest encompasses a wide range of environments temperatures vary with elevation. At higher elevations (7,000 feet/2,100 meters and up), summer temperatures range from 40 °F (4 °C) (night) to 78 °F (26 °C) (day), while winter temperatures can drop to a −15 °F (−26 °C) at night and rise to 50 °F (10 °C) during the day. At lower elevations (6,000 to 7,000 feet/1,800 to 2,100 meters), summer temperatures range from 50 to 90 °F (10 to 32 °C), while during the winter, temperatures rarely fall below 0 °F (−18 °C) and usually run from teens to 50s (-10 °C to +10 °C). At the lowest elevations (below 6,000 feet/1,800 meters), temperatures are generally 10 °F (−12 °C) higher throughout the year.

Spring is the windy season. These high winds dry the forest to the point of extreme fire danger. Fire is a constant threat in the Lincoln National Forest; notable wildfires in the forest include the 1950 Capitan Gap Fire and the 2022 McBride Fire. The fire season usually starts in March or April and continues through mid-July. If the fire danger becomes too high, open fires may be prohibited, and forest areas and roads may be closed. July through September is classified as the rainy season, which aids in fire prevention. The first snowfalls usually occur in late October, or early November. This season can continue for four or five months. Villages at medium elevations, such as Ruidoso and Capitan, annually receive 20-30 inches of snow, while higher elevations, such as the village of Cloudcroft, often receive 60 inches in a year.

Climate data for Elk, New Mexico, 1991–2020 normals, extremes 1895–present
Month	Jan	Feb	Mar	Apr	May	Jun	Jul	Aug	Sep	Oct	Nov	Dec	Year
Record high °F (°C)	82 (28)	84 (29)	91 (33)	91 (33)	99 (37)	106 (41)	110 (43)	99 (37)	94 (34)	89 (32)	84 (29)	78 (26)	110 (43)
Mean daily maximum °F (°C)	54.9 (12.7)	58.3 (14.6)	64.5 (18.1)	71.4 (21.9)	78.6 (25.9)	86.5 (30.3)	85.4 (29.7)	83.8 (28.8)	79.5 (26.4)	72.0 (22.2)	62.4 (16.9)	54.6 (12.6)	71.0 (21.7)
Daily mean °F (°C)	37.5 (3.1)	40.6 (4.8)	46.1 (7.8)	52.6 (11.4)	60.3 (15.7)	68.3 (20.2)	70.3 (21.3)	69.0 (20.6)	63.4 (17.4)	54.5 (12.5)	44.5 (6.9)	37.8 (3.2)	53.7 (12.1)
Mean daily minimum °F (°C)	20.1 (−6.6)	22.8 (−5.1)	27.8 (−2.3)	33.8 (1.0)	41.9 (5.5)	50.2 (10.1)	55.1 (12.8)	54.2 (12.3)	47.3 (8.5)	36.9 (2.7)	26.7 (−2.9)	20.9 (−6.2)	36.5 (2.5)
Record low °F (°C)	−24 (−31)	−24 (−31)	−7 (−22)	11 (−12)	20 (−7)	34 (1)	38 (3)	37 (3)	26 (−3)	−1 (−18)	−9 (−23)	−15 (−26)	−24 (−31)
Average precipitation inches (mm)	0.51 (13)	0.33 (8.4)	0.51 (13)	0.52 (13)	0.99 (25)	1.62 (41)	3.14 (80)	2.74 (70)	2.62 (67)	1.50 (38)	0.51 (13)	0.70 (18)	15.69 (399.4)
Average snowfall inches (cm)	3.1 (7.9)	2.0 (5.1)	1.2 (3.0)	0.2 (0.51)	0.0 (0.0)	0.0 (0.0)	0.0 (0.0)	0.0 (0.0)	0.0 (0.0)	1.5 (3.8)	1.9 (4.8)	3.5 (8.9)	13.4 (34.01)
Average precipitation days (≥ 0.01 in)	2.7	2.0	2.6	2.3	3.1	5.4	9.9	10.6	6.5	4.2	2.0	2.3	53.6
Average snowy days (≥ 0.1 in)	1.5	0.9	0.8	0.2	0.0	0.0	0.0	0.0	0.0	0.4	0.8	1.5	6.1
Source 1: NOAA
Source 2: xmACIS2

== Forest economics ==
Along with preservation and recreation, resource management and use is one of the main principles of the National Forest system. Initially created, in part, to help regulate the free grazing of livestock, which by the 1880s was leading to a significant loss of resources, one of the oldest uses for the forest area has been grazing. Over the last one hundred years the use of public lands for grazing has proved to be a stable and consistent addition to the local economy. As an example, a study by the Cooperative Extension Service at New Mexico State University, demonstrated that between 1970 and 2003 the average number of calves on forest lands was 6,233 head. During the same period, the price per calf at market averaged $530, implying that over the 33-year period livestock grazing rights contributed $3.3 million to the local economy. Another major type of resource in the forest is timber, the mighty oak, Ponderosa pine, and fir trees that cover much of the forest area. The importance of this resource has been known to generations of Natives and settlers, both Mexican and Anglo, as well as by the construction and railroad building industries that helped push Anglo society ever further west, and eventually connected the markets of the East Coast with the resources of the West. Along with grazing, logging is the oldest economic use of the forest area, and according to the NMSU study, generated an average of $11 million annually from 1970 to 1990 for the economies of the four counties in which the forest is contained. In terms of total economic impact, the massive diminution of consumptive activities on the Lincoln since 1990 has cost the region $14.7 million in potential revenues, comparable to the estimated income of 930 local residents.

The third use of forest resources is tourism, or "dispersed recreation" as it is referred to by the Forest Service. Since the extension of rail lines, and later highways, into southern New Mexico in the late 19th/early 20th centuries tourism has been a consistent part of the economics of the Lincoln. In 2004, the Forest Service's National Visitor Use Monitoring Study (NVUM) showed 735,237 visitors to the forest in that year. These visitors, multiplied by the estimated cost of an 8-hr Recreational Visitor Day (RVD), calculated as $5.93 in the NMSU study, implied a direct economic impact of 4.6 million, and a total impact of $8.33 million, including direct, indirect, and induced impacts on the region. While this is a substantial impact on the region, tourism remains the least stable and consistent of the three forest uses, and the one most vulnerable to change, both from local issues, such as fire and drought, and from larger regional or national issues, such as economic instability and high seasonal gasoline prices.

While the debates on forest planning and operations are often defined by the tension between these various uses—grazing, logging, and dispersed recreation—studies, such as the NMSU paper quoted above, have shown that no one industry can produce enough economic benefit for the region to offset the loss of revenues implied by the removal of one or both of the other two.

=== Firewood collection ===
While organized commercial logging has been drastically reduced in the forest area since 1990, the public use of the timber and forest resources by the public has continued, mainly in the collection of firewood. Forest visitors can purchase permits entitling them to collect up to four cords of timber, both "dead and down" and "green standing" from designated firewood collection areas throughout the forest. These permits are available at the Forest Headquarters and the three Ranger District offices.

=== Christmas trees ===
Along with collecting firewood, another long-standing tradition in the Lincoln National Forest is the cutting of Christmas trees during the holiday season. Permits to harvest Christmas trees can be purchased at the Forest Headquarters or any of the three District Ranger Offices.

== Recreation ==
Ranging from the floor of the Chihuahuan Desert to the forested peaks of the Sacramento and White Mountains, the Lincoln National Forest is a popular destination for year-around recreation, offering developed and dispersed camping, group picnic and camping facilities, developed trails for hikers, equestrians, and OHV's, wilderness areas, ski areas, and designated snow play areas. Hiking, picnicking, and camping are just a few activities popular within the Lincoln National Forest. Other outdoor sports include mountain biking and dirt bike racing. Because the environment changes rapidly, hikers, campers, hunters, etc. must constantly be aware of safety concerns.

=== Smokey Bear Ranger District ===
The Smokey Bear district has 6 developed family campgrounds and 2 group-camping areas. Three of these areas, Montjeau, Baca, and Skyline are free, the others are fee areas. Two areas located at lower elevation, Three Rivers and Baca, are open year-around. The others, located at higher elevations, generally operate on a May to September schedule, subject to weather.

Picnic areas include Schoolhouse Canyon on the Rio Bonito, and Cedar Creek Picnic Area, which has picnic tables, grills, water, and restrooms. Cedar Creek also offers a covered group picnic pavilion that can be reserved by groups of less than 40. The district has over 50 hiking trails of varying lengths and all difficulty levels. The majority of these trails are less than three miles in length and are located within the two designated wilderness areas. Longer backpacking trails include the 20-mile long Crest Trail (T25) in the White Mountain Wilderness and the 11.1 mile long South Base Trail (T57 ) in the Capitan Wilderness.

=== Sacramento Ranger District ===
The most heavily developed of the three ranger districts, the Sacramento district has 10 developed campgrounds and 5 group-camping sites. Three areas, James Canyon, Upper Karr Canyon, and Lower Karr Canyon are free. Upper Karr is open year-round, while the others are generally open from May to September, weather permitting. Popular day-use picnic sites include the Trestle Recreation Area near Cloudcroft, and Bluff Springs, a partially developed area near a scenic waterfall.

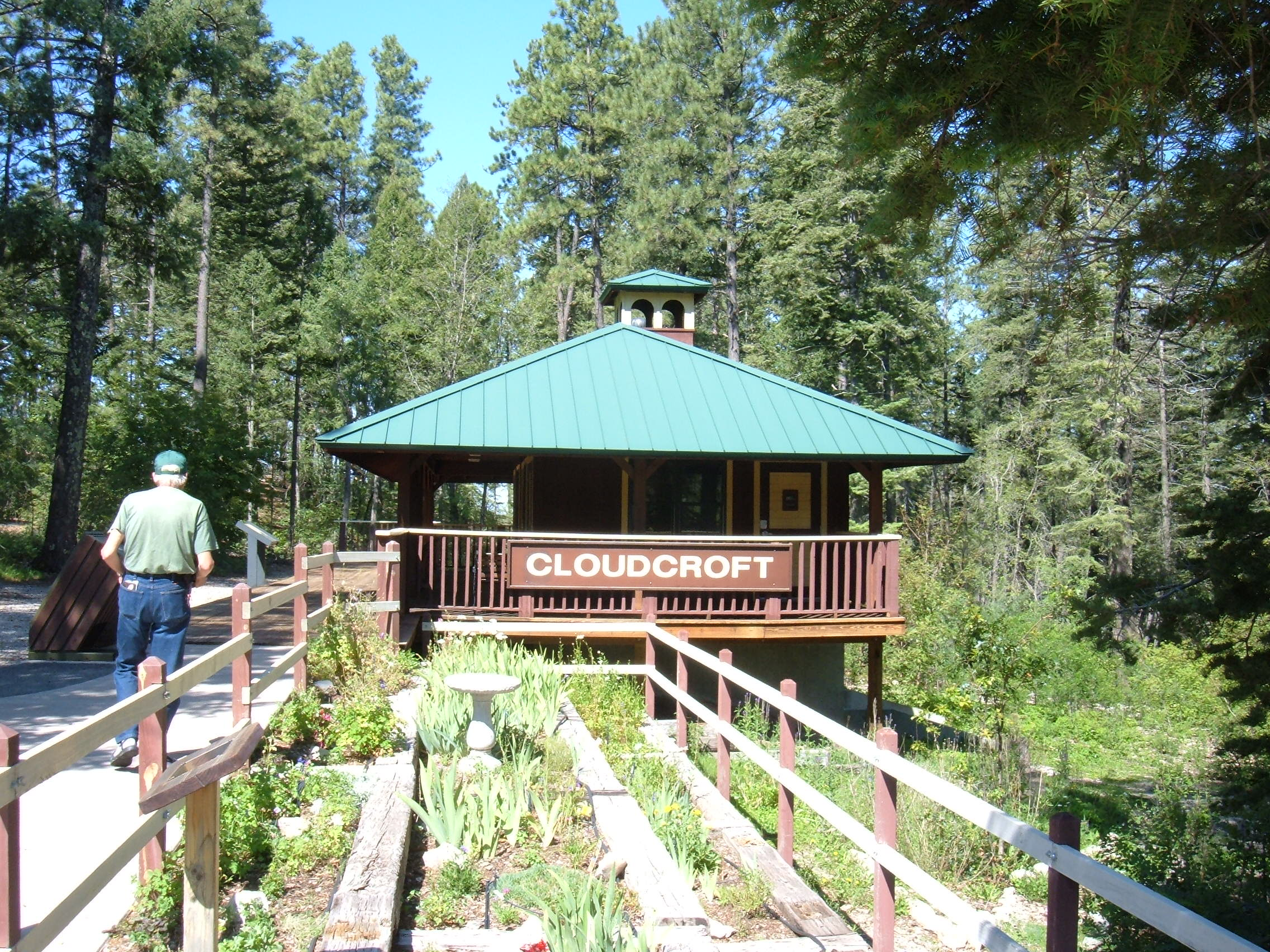
Train depot replica at Trestle Recreation Area.

There are more than 50 trails within the district to challenge hikers of all skill levels. Many of these trails explore small canyons, lead to natural features, such as waterfalls and springs, and follow the abandoned beds of the railroads that once hauled timber from the high forests down the desert floor. While the majority of these trails are shorter than 3 miles in length, the Sacramento district has several long multi-day backpacking trails, including the 29-mile long Rim Trail (T105). The district also includes the 5-mile long Dog Canyon National Recreation Trail, which begins immediately west of the forest in Oliver Lee Memorial State Park, south of Alamogordo and climbs over 3000 ft to the heart of the forest.

=== Guadalupe Ranger District ===
The most remote of the three ranger districts, the Guadalupe district only has one developed facility, Sitting Bull Falls Picnic Area. An oasis in the desert located approximately 20 miles west of Carlsbad, Sitting Bull Falls has covered picnic tables, fire grills, water, restrooms, and access to a number of trails, including a .5-mile trail (T68A) to the 150 ft Sitting Bull Falls. This is a day-use facility only, with no camping allowed.

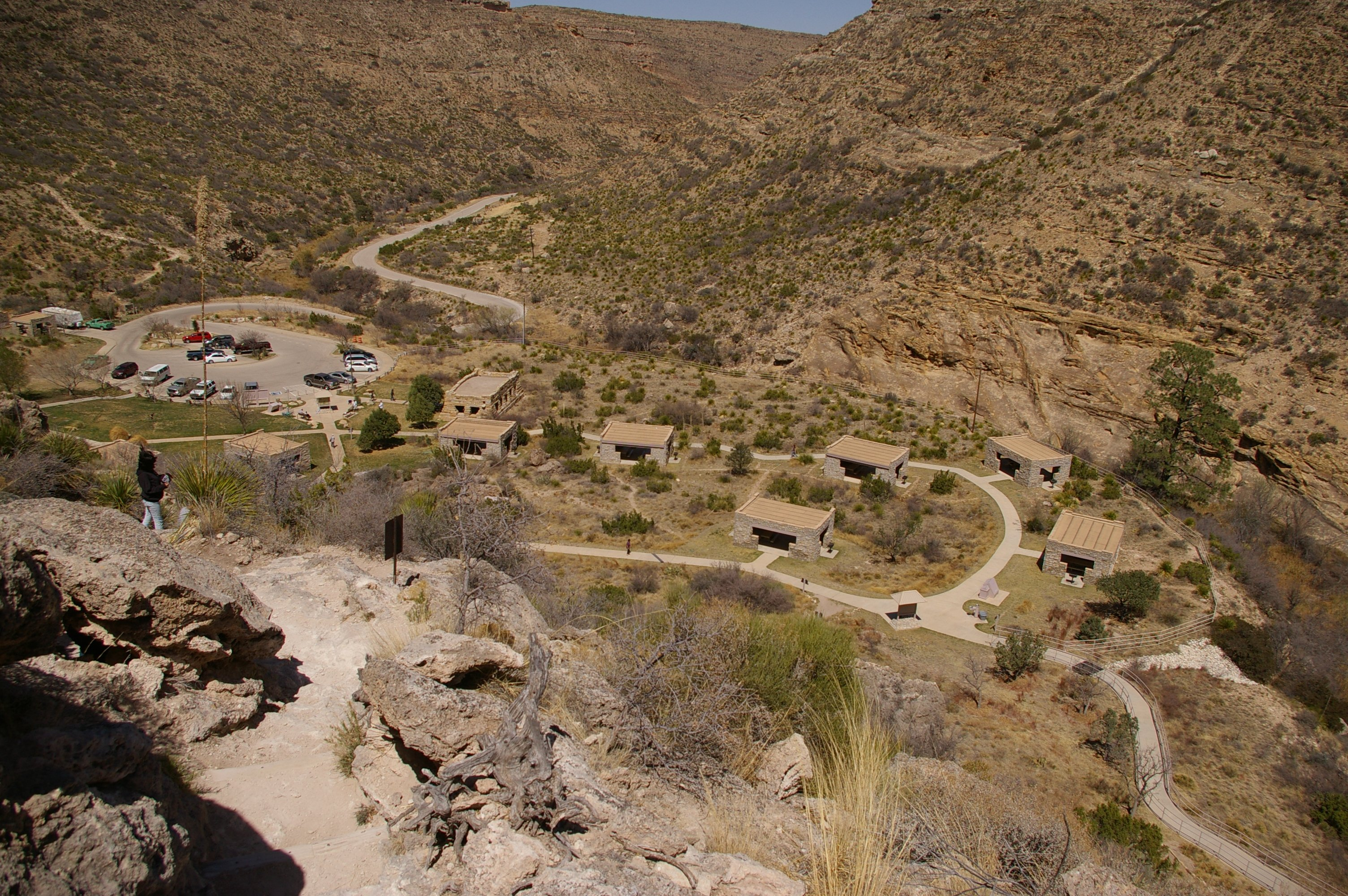
Sitting Bull Falls Picnic Area

The district has 23 developed trails, most of which are 3 miles in length or less. These trails can be found in all parts of the district, from the deep canyons in the south to the rolling hills further north and range from easy to difficult. The majority of these trails are also open to pack and service animals. Neither mechanized or motorized vehicles are allowed on the trails in the Guadalupe district, though OHV's are allowed on most forest roads. Scenic drives in the district include an approximately 50-mile trip west from Carlsbad on N.M. 137 to 5 Points Vista, a scenic overlook with views of the Guadalupe Mountains and the Rim, the 1500' - 2000' cliff that extends the entire north–south length of the district and which marks the western edge of the Guadalupe range.

=== Wilderness areas ===
The Lincoln is home to a pair of designated wilderness areas, the Capitan Mountains Wilderness and the White Mountain Wilderness, both located in the Smoky Bear Ranger District.

==== Capitan Mountains Wilderness ====
The Capitan Mountains Wilderness was created as part of the New Mexico Wilderness Act of 1980 (Public law 96-550), passed in December 1980, which placed 34,000 acres of public lands in the rugged mountains north of Lincoln and north-east of Capitan into the National Wilderness Preservation System. Protecting a rare (for New Mexico) east–west mountain range, the Capitan Mountains Wilderness measures 12 miles long and from two to six miles wide. Elevations range from about 5,500 feet to 10,083 feet at the top of Capitan Peak. Because of the rugged nature of the area there are few trail heads into the wilderness and those require the use of a 4-wheel drive, high-clearance vehicle.

==== White Mountain Wilderness ====
The White Mountain Wilderness was created in 1964 as part of the bill (Public Law 88-577) that created the National Wilderness Preservation System. Originally protecting 28,118 acres NW of Ruidoso, the size of the wilderness area was increased by 16,860 acres in 1980. Beginning on the northern border of the Mescalero Apache Reservation west of Sierra Blanca Peak, the wilderness follows the main ridge of the White Mountains (Sierra Blanca in Spanish) north 12.5 miles. Ranging from 4–12 miles in width the wilderness also includes numerous side canyons and a few year-round streams. Passenger vehicles can access the over 50 trails in the wilderness from the Three Rivers, Nogal Canyon, Crest and Mill's trailheads. Other trail heads can be accessed by 4-wheel, high-clearance vehicles.

As with all designated wilderness areas mechanized and motorized vehicles are prohibited in the White Mountains and Capitan Mountains Wildernesses. Access can only be by foot or horse. Totally undeveloped, these areas have no amenities and require hikers and backpackers to practice "Leave No Trace" camping techniques.

=== Dispersed camping ===
Many areas of the Lincoln National Forest are open to dispersed camping, meaning that visitors are allowed to drive up to 300' from public roads onto forest lands for camping. This type of primitive camping is free and does not require a permit. Since these are undeveloped areas there is no water, restrooms, or other amenities. Not all forest lands are open to dispersed camping, so visitors should consult the current Motor Vehicle Use Map for the specific Ranger District to find eligible areas. Popular areas for dispersed camping are the Upper Bonito Dispersed Camping Area, NW of Ruidoso in the Smokey Bear Ranger District and Lower Karr Canyon in the Sacramento R.D. south of Cloudcroft.

=== Equestrian and mountain-biking trails ===
While there are no designated equestrian campgrounds, pack and saddle animals are allowed on the vast majority of trails within the forest. Mountain bikes are permitted on most of the trails in the Sacramento district, as well as 10+ trails in the Smokey Bear district. Mechanized vehicles are not permitted on any trail in the Guadalupe district.

=== OHVs ===
The roads and developed trails of the Lincoln National Forest are popular areas for Off-Highway Vehicles (OHVs), such as motorcycles and ATVs. All three districts allow OHVs less than 50" wide on designated forest service roads. Riders should consult the current Motor Vehicle User Map to see which forest roads are open to OHVs. There are also a large number of trails open to OHVs in both the Sacramento and Smokey Bear Ranger Districts, including the last 28 miles of the Rim Trail (T105). All trails in the Guadalupe Ranger District are closed to motorized vehicles.

=== Winter activities ===
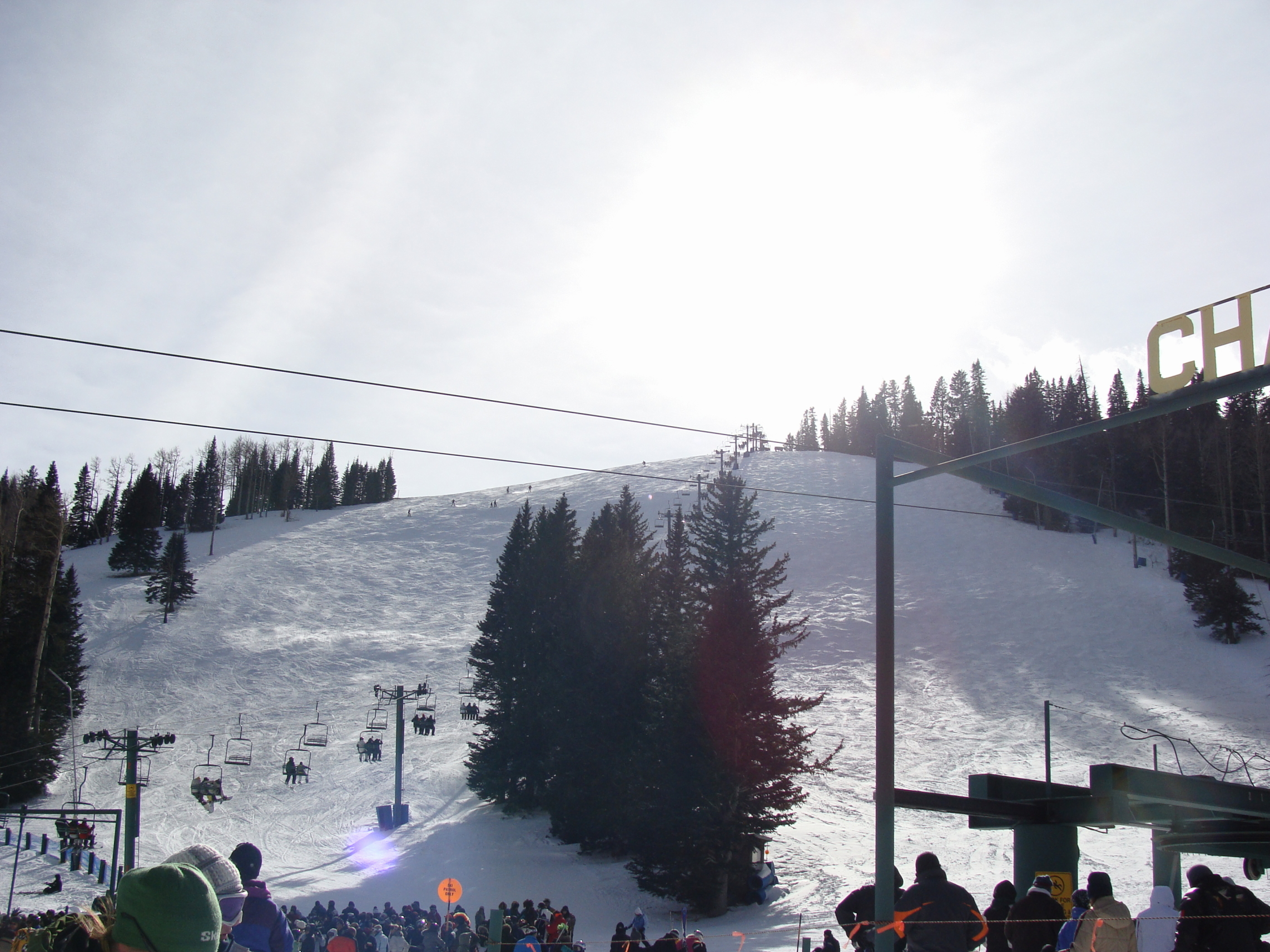
Ski Apache ski area, Smokey Bear Ranger District

Winter in southern New Mexico brings new recreational opportunities to all parts of the Lincoln National Forest from the dry, desert lowlands to the snowy, high mountain areas. Snow skiing and snowboarding is available at Ski Apache, a Mescalero Apache-owned resort on Sierra Blanca, in the Smokey Bear Ranger District approximately 15 miles west of Ruidoso. The Upper Karr Canyon Area near Cloudcroft is designated for snow sledding and tubing, and two trails, the 1.9 mile Fir Trail (T122) and the 2.8 mile Little Apache Trail (T124) are maintained in winter as cross-country skiing trails. These trails can be accessed from the Silver Overflow Campground in the Sacramento Ranger District, near Cloudcroft. For campers, the Three Rivers and Baca campgrounds in the Smokey Bear district and the Upper Karr Canyon site in the Sacramento district are open year-round.

== Location and access ==
=== Towns and cities ===
The following towns and villages lie within the bounds of the Lincoln National Forest:

- Cloudcroft, New Mexico
- High Rolls, New Mexico
- Mayhill, New Mexico
- Ruidoso, New Mexico
- Ruidoso Downs, New Mexico
- Sacramento, New Mexico
- Sunspot, New Mexico
- Timberon, New Mexico
- Queen, New Mexico
- Capitan, New Mexico
- Lincoln, New Mexico

Larger cities near the Forest include:

- Alamogordo, New Mexico
- Carlsbad, New Mexico
- Las Cruces, New Mexico
- El Paso, Texas

=== Transportation ===
==== Airports ====
- Sierra Blanca Regional Airport, located about 15 miles (24 km)northwest of Ruidoso

==== Major highways ====
The following major highways traverse the Lincoln National Forest:

- U.S. Route 70
- U.S. Route 82
- U.S. Route 380
- NM 37
- NM 48

== Nearby attractions ==
The Lincoln National Forest is only one of many public lands in the south-central region of New Mexico. Immediately west of the Sacramento Ranger District is White Sands National Park, known to millions for its shifting ocean of fine, white gypsum sand. A small section of the enormous dune field, located west of Alamogordo on U.S. 70, White Sands offers dune field access, picnic sites, and primitive camping. South of Alamogordo is Oliver Lee Memorial State Park, a New Mexico state park on the canyon floor west of the Sacramento Mountains. A full service park with both tent and RV camping, group camping and group picnic areas, Oliver Lee is also the trailhead for the Dog Canyon Trail, which climbs 2000' into the forested mountains of the Sacramento District. West of White Sands and approximately 70 miles west of Alamogordo is the recently created Organ Mountains–Desert Peaks National Monument, a unit of the Bureau of Land Management created to protect the jagged Organ Mountains on the eastern outskirts of Las Cruces. Though a newer park, the area does contains a camp ground and trail heads for day hikes into the mountains.

South of the Guadalupe District and west of Carlsbad lies two renowned national parks, Carlsbad Caverns and Guadalupe Mountains National Parks. Located on U.S. 62/180 approx. 30 miles west of Carlsbad, Carlsbad Caverns National Park is a world-famous site for exploring both developed and undeveloped caves. Primarily a day-use area, the park does have limited opportunities for backpacking on the high ridges west of the cavern's entrance. Immediately west of Carlsbad Caverns, on the Texas side of the border, is Guadalupe Mountains National Park. Established in 1970, GMNP protects Guadalupe Peak and El Capitan, the two tallest mountains in the state, as well as scenic McKittrick Canyon, known for its fall colors. A favorite destination for hikers and backpackers, GMNP has a number of trails for both day hikes and backpacking. Shorter trips lead to a number of historical areas, such as the Butterfield Stagecoach station near Pine Springs, while longer treks climb high into the mountains and far into the adjacent salt-flats. One of the more popular hikes is the 4.5 mile trail to the top of Guadalupe Peak, where decades of climbers have signed the register book at the summit. A number of semi-developed back-country campsites make possible a wide range of multi-day trips. For campers, GMNP has two developed campgrounds, one at Pine Springs, near the park headquarters on U.S. 62/180 and Dog Canyon, on the New Mexico side, approximately 70 miles west of Carlsbad.

== See also ==
- List of national forests of the United States
- Mescalero Apache Indian Reservation
- Alamo National Forest
- Sacramento National Forest
- Guadalupe National Forest
- Smokey Bear
- Lincoln County War
