= White Mountain Wilderness =

Wilderness area in New Mexico, US

- IUCN category Ib (wilderness area)
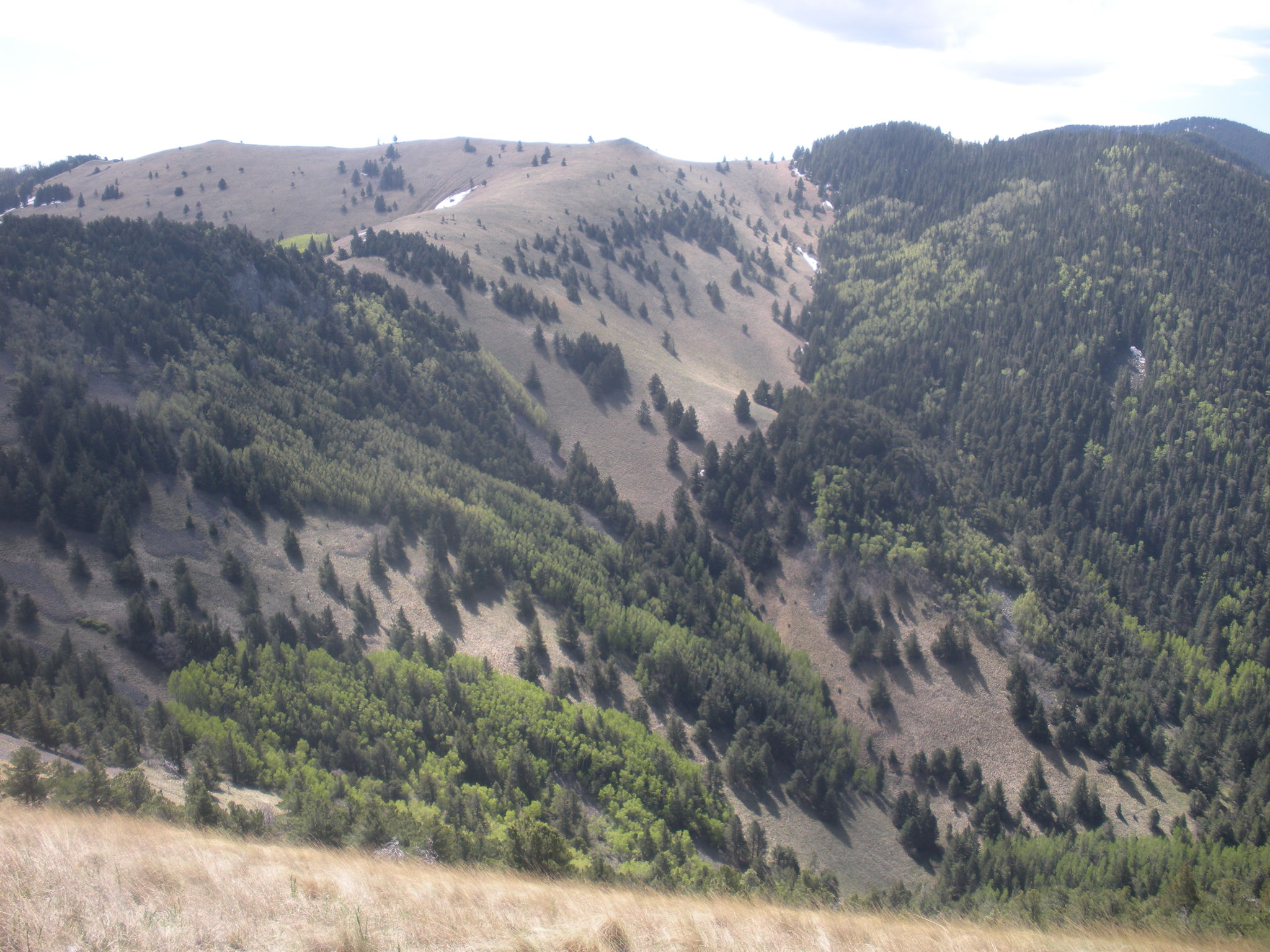
- White Mountain Wilderness along the Crest Trail

- Location within the United States
- Location: Lincoln County, New Mexico, United States
- Nearest city: Ruidoso, New Mexico
- Coordinates: 33.4375°N 105.750278°W
- Area: 46,963 acres (19,005 ha)
- Established: 1964
- Administrator: Lincoln National Forest, US Forest Service

The White Mountain Wilderness is a 46,963 acre designated wilderness area managed by the United States Forest Service. Located in the Smokey Bear Ranger District of the Lincoln National Forest, the White Mountain Wilderness lies in the Sierra Blanca mountains of south central New Mexico, approximately 15 miles (24 km) north northwest of the town of Ruidoso.

== History and Administration ==
The White Mountain Wilderness was first established as a primitive area by the United States Congress in 1933. After the passage of Public Law 88-577, also known as The Wilderness Act, in September 1964, the primitive area was re-designated as the White Mountains Wilderness Area and entered into the newly created National Wilderness Preservation System. Originally established at 28,118 acres, Public Law 96-550, the New Mexico Wilderness Act, added an additional 16,860 acres to the area in December 1980, increasing the total size to 46,963 acres. The Wilderness Area is administered by the United States Forest Service as part of the Lincoln National Forest, headquartered in Alamogordo, New Mexico. Located in the Smokey Bear Ranger District of the Lincoln, the Wilderness is managed from the District Ranger Office in Ruidoso, New Mexico.

== Geography and Climate ==
This wilderness area contains approximately 46,963 acres (19,005 ha) of land and is approximately 12.5 miles (20.1 km) long and 12 miles (19 km) wide. It consists of mainly a long, northerly running ridge and its branches. The west side of this ridge is extremely steep and rugged, while the eastern side is more gentle with broader, forested canyons and some small streams. Elevations range from 6,400 feet (2,000 m) at Three Rivers Campground on the western side to 11,580 feet (3,530 m) near Lookout Mountain in the south.

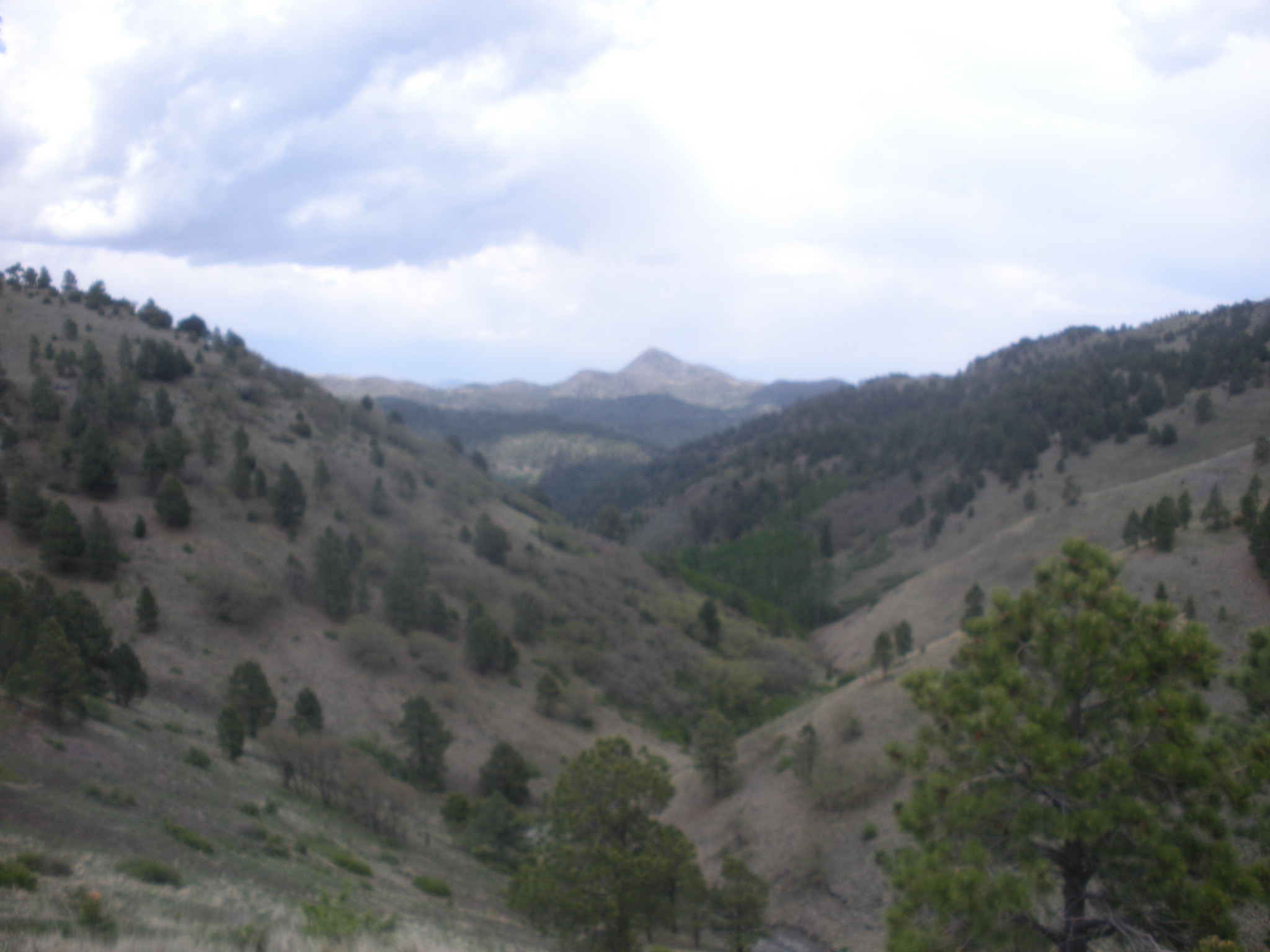
View of Nogal Peak in the White Mountain Wilderness

There are four different life zones within this wilderness area: pinyon-juniper, ponderosa pine, mixed conifer, and sub-alpine forest, plus alpine tundra found at the summit of Sierra Blanca just outside the wilderness boundary. Abrupt changes in elevation, escarpments, rock outcroppings, and avalanche chutes make for striking contrast and scenery. The area is also interspersed with meadows and grass-oak savannahs, which are the result of forest fires. The weather is dry and windy in springtime, with temperatures ranging from 32 °F/0 °C to 80 °F/26 °C. July and August are the rainy months with frequent afternoon showers and high temperatures averaging 85 °F/29 °C. Snows in winter do not typically begin until mid-November, and snowfall averages 6 feet (1.8 m) or more. Low temperatures during winter average around 22 °F (−6 °C), but have reached as low as −15 °F (−26 °C).

Water sources are not abundant, but do exist in the form of small streams or springs scattered throughout the area. Trails with good water access include Big Bonito Trail and South Fork Trail. Although fishing is permitted within the wilderness area, few fish are found due to the small size of most streams. Although the streams run well most of the year, in times of severe drought, they may be non-existent.

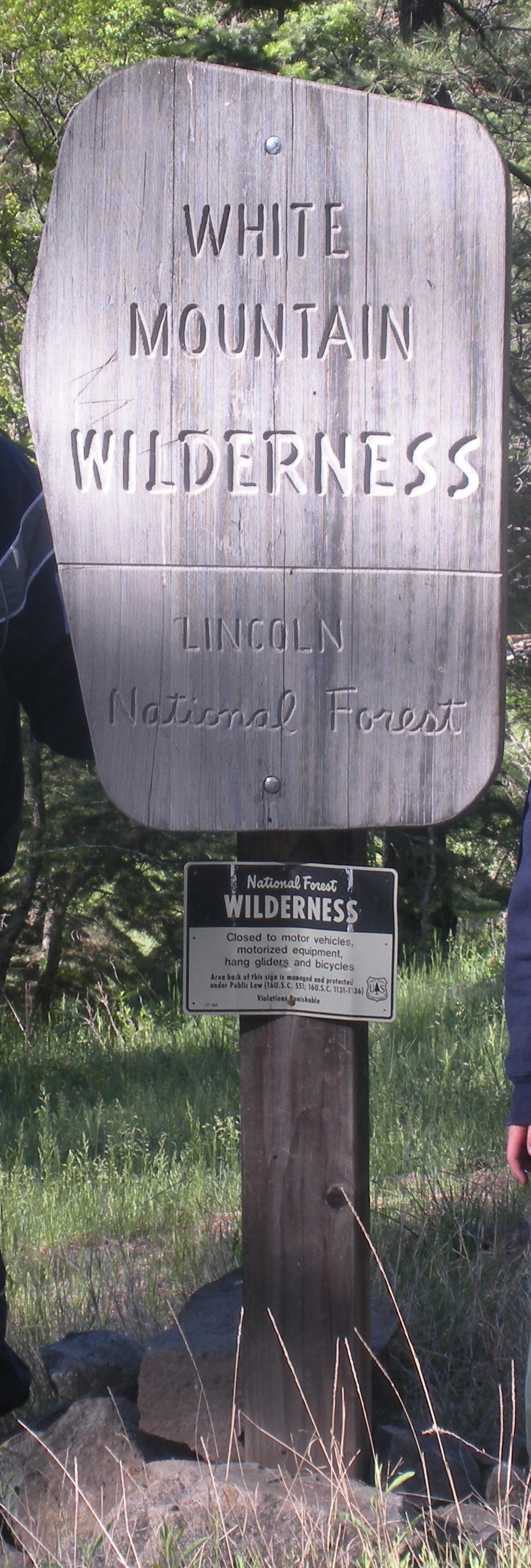
Wilderness sign

== Wildlife ==
Wildlife commonly found in the Wilderness Area include mule deer, elk, black bear, turkey, porcupine, badger, bobcat, gray fox, coyote, skunk, spruce and rock squirrels, and numerous species of mice, moles, and birds. The White Mountain area is also home to many types of birds and is a critical habitat for several species, including the northern three-toed woodpecker, Clark's nutcracker, red-breasted nuthatche, Townsend's solitaires, and golden-crowned kinglets.

== Location and Access ==
Located approximately 15 miles NNW of Ruidoso, the northern and eastern sections of the Wilderness can be accessed by passenger car from Ruidoso via NM state highways 48 and 37, while the southern half can be reached from either Ruidoso, via state highway 532 or from Carrizozo, New Mexico or Tularosa, New Mexico via US 54. As with all designated Wilderness Areas the White Mountains Wilderness is closed to all forms of mechanized transport, so the most common means of access is via trailheads, small developed parking areas located just outside the Wilderness’ boundaries. New Mexico 37 offers access to the Nogal Canyon Trailhead, via Forest Road 400, the Mills Canyon and Argentina & Bonito Trailheads via Forest Road 107, and the Crest Trailhead via Forest Roads 107 and 108. State Highway 532 offers access to the Wilderness via Ski Apache, a winter sports area west of Ruidoso operated by the Mescalero Apache Reservation. US 54 offers access to the Three Rivers Trailhead at the Three Rivers Campground, a small Forest Service camping area at the end of Forest Road 579, a 13-mile road that begins on US 54 approximately 18 miles north of Tularosa and 24 miles south of Carrizozo.

== Recreation ==
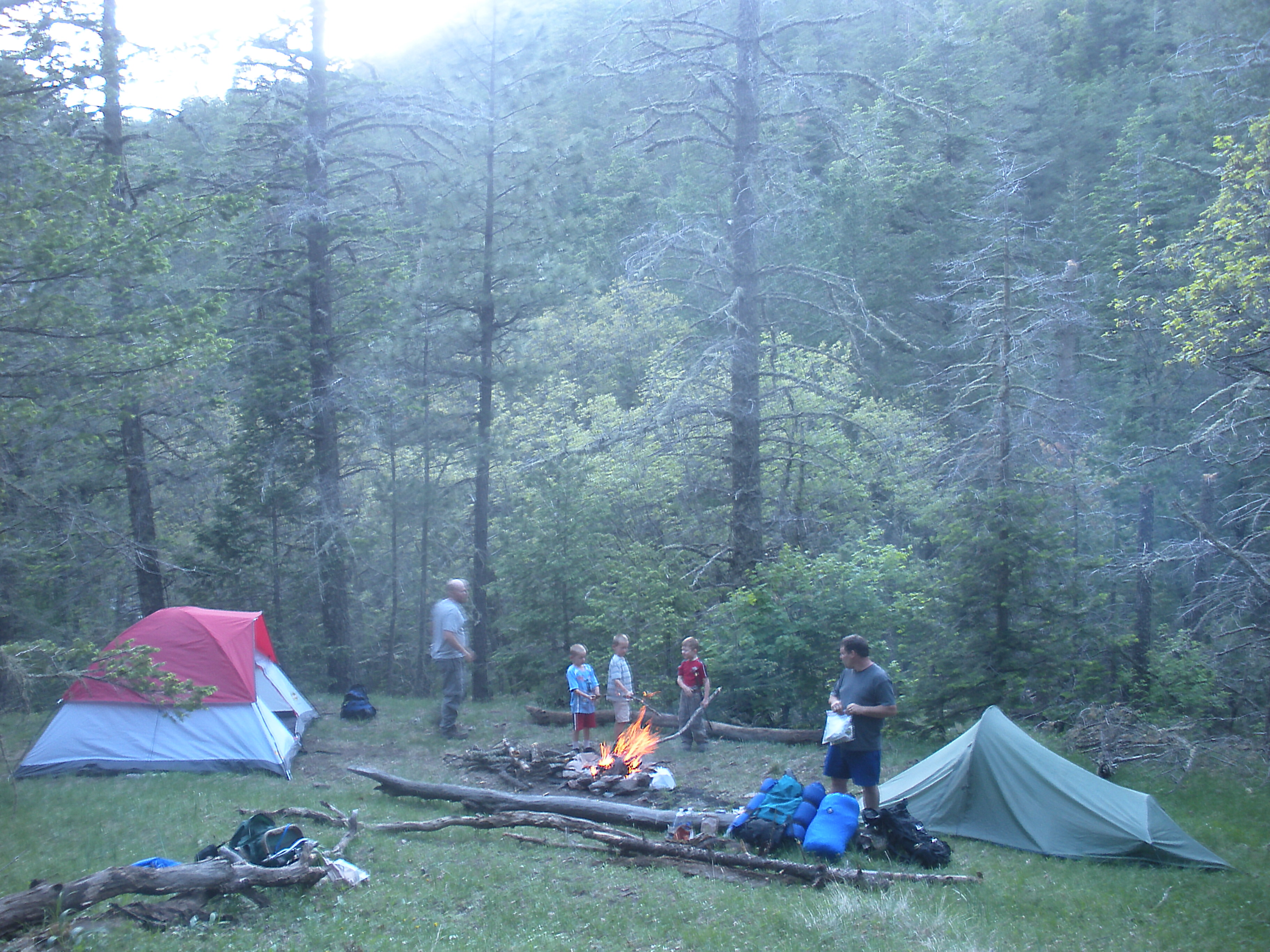
Campers in White Mountain Wilderness

While there are no developed facilities within the Wilderness, the area is open to hiking, backpacking, horse-back riding, and primitive “Leave No Trace” camping. For hikers and riders the Wilderness contains a developed trail system of nearly two dozen maintained trails ranging in length from 0.8 miles to 20 miles and rated from easy to difficult. The area's longest trail, the 20-mile long Crest Trail (T25), runs across much of the eastern end of the Wilderness and crosses a number of smaller trails, including the Big Bonito Trail (T36), the Scenic Trail (T15), and the Three Rivers Trail (T44).

== Nearby Attractions ==
The area's namesake peak, Sierra Blanca (White Mountain) is located on the adjacent Mescalero Indian Reservation and can reached by a 1.25 mile (2 km) trail from Lookout Mountain. Reaching 11,973 feet (3,649 m), Sierra Blanca is the southernmost mountain in the continental United States to rise above timberline. Other areas of interest near the Wilderness include the previously mentioned Ski Apache winter sports area, and the Monjeau Lookout, a stone fire lookout tower built in the 1930s. The Lincoln National Forest's other Wilderness Area, the Capitan Mountains Wilderness, is located NE of the White Mountains Wilderness, near Capitan, New Mexico. Also located in the Smokey Bear Ranger District, the Capitan Wilderness is considerably more rugged and remote than the White Mountain Wilderness, and can only be accessed by high-clearance vehicles. Also near Capitan is the Fort Stanton-Snowy River Cave National Conservation Area. A former frontier military reservation, the Bureau of Land Management-administered area protects the 31-mile Fort Stanton Cave complex, the 14th longest cave in the United States.
