= Capitan Mountains Wilderness =

Wilderness area in New Mexico, US

Capitan Mountain Wilderness
- IUCN category Ib (wilderness area)
- Interactive map of Capitan Mountain Wilderness
- Nearest city: Capitan, New Mexico
- Area: 35,067 acres (14,191 ha)
- Established: December 19, 1980
- Governing body: U.S. Forest Service

Capitan Mountains Wilderness is a 35,067-acre (14,191 ha) Wilderness area located within the Lincoln National Forest in New Mexico. The area was added to the National Wilderness Preservation System on December 19, 1980 by Public Law 96-550. Located in the Capitan Mountains, this area is recognized as the birthplace of Smokey Bear. There are a number of trails through the wilderness, but access to trailheads is difficult as most are only reachable by four-wheel-drive roads.
